= Pasja (2002) =

Installation art piece by Dorota Nieznalska

Pasja is an installation art by Dorota Nieznalska, a contemporary Polish artist, belonging to the trend of 'critical art', exhibited at the Gdańsk Wyspa Gallery in 2001. The installation consisted of two parts: a video showing a man exercising in a gym and a metal cross suspended on a chain with an embedded photograph of a penis in the central place.

The juxtaposition of these two elements – a symbol sacred to Christians and male genitalia – sparked significant controversy in the media and subsequently in society, provoking a discussion about the boundaries of art and freedom of artistic expression. Nieznalska was accused of offending religious sentiments and in 2003 was sentenced to perform community service. However, she appealed the verdict and in 2010 was acquitted of all charges.

== Circumstances of creation ==
In 1999, Nieznalska first addressed religion and religiosity in her diploma work titled Absolution (an installation composed of photographs, video, and a wooden confessional). At that time, she was also interested in issues related to the sources of evil, domination, violence, aggression, and earlier, the problem of rape (the installation Modus Operandi from 1998). This is reflected, among other works, in her untitled series of photographs from 1999, depicting the relationship between a naked man and a submissive dog.

Through her partner, she became acquainted with the community of men exercising in amateur gyms. Visits to such places inspired her in 2000 to create the installation Omnipotence: A Male Kind, consisting of gym equipment (rubber mat, chalk, mirrors, steel exercise bars). The entire installation was illuminated with red light, accompanied by sounds recorded in the gym aimed at evoking sexual connotations: panting, groaning, and swearing. In 2001, Nieznalska exhibited a photograph titled Potency, depicting a man with a clenched fist in the groin area and tense muscles. The Pasja installation was a continuation of the theme of masculinity, including physical strength and the cult of machismo, which the artist emphasized in numerous interviews.

== Description of the installation ==
Pasja installation consists of a 45-minute looping, colorful video material (without sound), depicting in slow motion the face of a man exercising in a gym, and a steel cross measuring 104.7 x 90 x 19.5 cm suspended on a chain. The structural elements of the cross were custom-made at the Center of Polish Sculpture in Orońsko, then cut and welded together by Nieznalska. The entire surface of the cross features a colorful photograph of a penis, with the genitalia located at the central point. (Note: Nieznalska never revealed the personalities of the person posing for this photograph, also before the court she refused to answer this question (Grzebałkowska & Karaś (2011, p. 10)).) The cross was of the Greek type, as evidenced by its proportions – different from those of a Latin cross. The film was projected using a video projector, and the entire installation was presented in a darkened room.

== Exhibitions ==
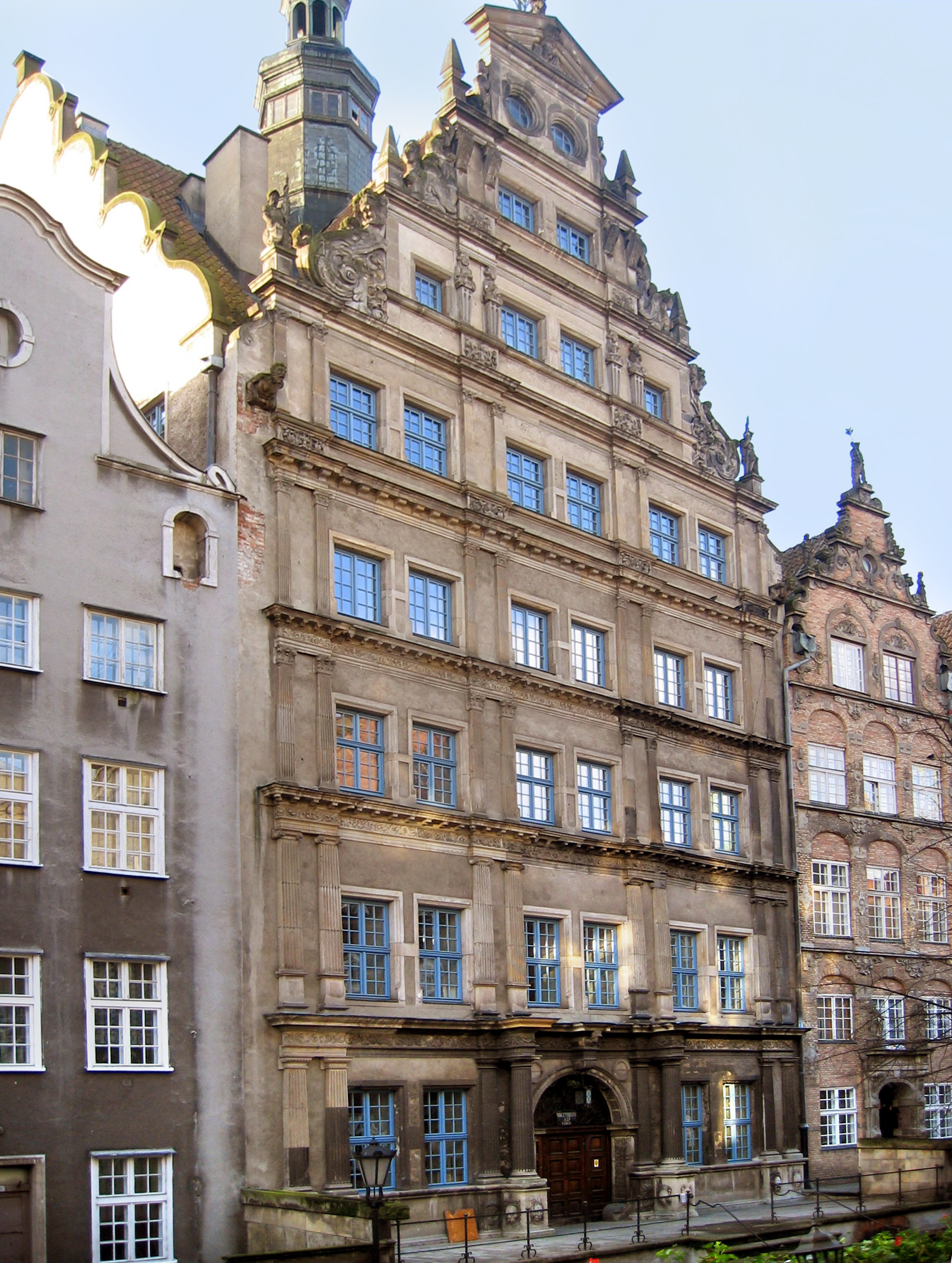
The Academy of Fine Arts Student House, where one of the floors was occupied by the Wyspa Gallery until 2002; the site of Pasja exhibition

Pasja installation was first exhibited in 2001 at the Arsenal Gallery in Białystok. At the request of the director, Monika Szewczyk, the central place of the steel cross was covered with a white card (the director feared protests from local politicians from the League of Polish Families). On the occasion of the exhibition, a 28-page catalogue was issued (ISBN 83-86662-68-9) in Polish and English.

The installation was fully shown for the first time as part of the exhibition New Works, open from 14 December 2001, to 20 January 2002, from Monday to Friday from 11 AM to 2 PM, at the Wyspa Gallery in Gdańsk (Student House of the Academy of Fine Arts at 13/16 Chlebnicka Street). The exhibition received funding from the city budget (amounting to 2000 PLN), and its description and project were approved by the Vice President of Gdańsk, Adam Landowski, and the Director of the Department of Social Affairs in Gdańsk, Krystyna Konieczna. The curator was Grzegorz Klaman, a professor at the Academy of Fine Arts and the promoter of Nieznalska's diploma work. At his suggestion, the artist stayed in the gallery every day during the exhibition to explain the meaning of Pasja to visitors.

== Meaning ==
The work explores the theme of the cult of the male body and the associated suffering. The title refers to the ambiguity of the word pasja (English: passion), which in Polish means both great enthusiasm for something and the suffering of Christ (its description, representation, and cult of this suffering). It is a term that refers to both the sacred and profane spheres. The artist juxtaposed in the installation the physical pain willingly undertaken by men who want to have a stronger body through exercise, as well as the suffering resulting from religious faith. This juxtaposition gave the installation an ironic undertone.

Nieznalska commented on her work as follows:

Pasja, which was in no way related to religion or faith, and solely addressed the current passion in our culture for arming masculinity with muscles through persistent workouts in gyms, was mistakenly interpreted as an attack on the greatest sanctities.

According to Piotr Piotrowski, the figure of the cross used in the installation does not refer to the figure of Christ, as he was crucified on a Latin cross. Nieznalska, however, used a Greek cross, symbolizing an ideal. The genitals in Nieznalska's work symbolize masculinity, and their placement on the Greek cross shows that they are an idealized symbol.

On the other hand, according to Izabela Kowalczyk, the juxtaposition of genitals (symbolizing masculinity) with the cross and gym workouts places masculinity in two contexts: the Catholic and consumerist models of life. She associates them with meanings such as suffering and self-sacrifice, showing that the standards set for men are practically unattainable. Kowalczyk also interprets Pasja as a work about the contemporary adoption of a new religion by consumer culture, seeing the gym in this context as a new temple.

According to American theater researcher Magda Romanska, in Pasja, the male body is objectified and subjected to violence, similar to what traditionally happened to the female body. At the same time, the researcher sees in the installation an expression of empathy and an attempt to understand the tormented and pressured masculinity. The symbol of the cross used in Pasja does not have a religious dimension; it represents suffering as such. The genitals inscribed within it indicate the source of this suffering: the cultural ideal of masculinity, which forces men to exceed their physical capabilities to confirm their gender identity. Romanska also associates Pasja with feminist art, which addressed the oppressive action of culture on femininity and the compulsive behaviors it induced in women.

A different interpretation was proposed by literary scholar Marcin Kowalczyk, placing Pasja in the context of carnivalesque. According to him, while the author did touch upon the theme of training for masculinity and the persistent building of a muscular silhouette through suffering, by using the symbol of the cross with a photograph of a penis in her work, she desacralized this symbol (placing it in the realm of the material and corporeal). Kowalczyk refers to other works of contemporary art that fit into the logic of carnivalesque: Andres Serrano's Piss Christ, Chris Ofili's The Holy Virgin Mary, Renée Cox's Yo Mama's Last Supper, and others.

Other interpretations relate the genitals placed on the cross to Christian iconography, in which the visible genitals on depictions of the crucified Christ symbolized his humanity. Critic and curator Paweł Leszkowicz interpreted Pasja as a portrait of male masochism, where men continually increase their physical strength. On the other hand, according to Agnieszka Sabor, Nieznalska's work is not a work of art (i.e., it lacks artistic value) but rather a statement of engaged, social, and feminist journalism and should only be considered through this prism.

Jerzy Krechowicz, the former rector of the Academy of Fine Arts in Gdańsk, testified in court that in his opinion, Nieznalska's work does not present any artistic value, is graphomaniacal, and was created only to provoke.

== Reaction from the media and politicians ==
=== Background ===
In the 1990s and early 2000s, many works of artists, especially those belonging to the critical art movement, sparked controversy in the media and Polish society. The first work to provoke such a reaction was Katarzyna Kozyra's Pyramid of Animals (1993), followed by works such as Piotr Uklański's Nazis (1998), Zbigniew Libera's Lego. Concentration Camp (1996), and Maurizio Cattelan's sculpture depicting Pope John Paul II crushed by a meteorite. However, the greatest controversy was stirred by Nieznalska's installation, due to the juxtaposition of the cross (a Christian symbol of the death and resurrection of Jesus) and the genitals.

=== Media ===
On the day of the exhibition opening, an article titled Feminist Passion appeared in the supplement to Gazeta Wyborcza's "Co jest grane?" ("What's on?") section, informing about the exhibition and the planned vernissage at 7:00 PM. Three days before the end of the exhibition, on 17 January 2002, an article titled Controversial Passion by Anna Urbańczyk was published in the local supplement to Gazeta Wyborcza. According to the author, the juxtaposition of the cross and male genitalia was surprising: It's no wonder that the realization shocks; it can (and does) offend religious feelings.

On January 18, in the main edition of the Fakty TVN news program, a segment about Pasja was aired, titled Trick. On January 19, other press and television media also expressed interest in the installation, and the matter gained enormous publicity. Everyone who commented on the exhibition admitted that they had not seen it personally.

=== Incident at the gallery ===
On 21 January 2002, an incident involving members of the League of Polish Families, including Gertruda Szumska, Stanisław Żyła, and Robert Strąk, occurred in the gallery, which was closed to the public that day. They barged into the exhibition rooms demanding the release of the installation, specifically the steel cross, claiming that Nieznalska's work offended their religious feelings. However, their intention did not materialize because the exhibition had already been dismantled, and the artist refused to hand over the cross to them. Journalists were witnesses to this incident. Robert Strąk, a member of the League of Polish Families from Gdynia, issued a statement to the press at that time, in which he wrote, among other things:

We believe that there should be an ethical code for artists or pseudo-artists because what Mrs. Nieznalska is doing, for example, is seeking cheap publicity. I believe that promoting one's name by insulting the religious feelings of others is disgraceful, and such things should not happen in our country, in the center of Europe.

== Criminal proceedings ==
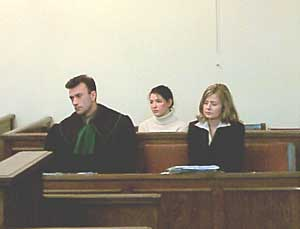
Dorota Nieznalska on the defendant's bench in the District Court in Gdańsk (13 January 2003)

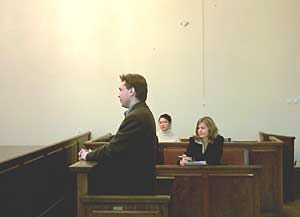
Robert Strąk testifies before the District Court in Gdańsk; Nieznalska in the background (13 January 2003)

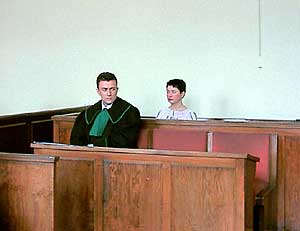
Dorota Nieznalska on the defendant's bench in the District Court in Gdańsk (28 April 2003)

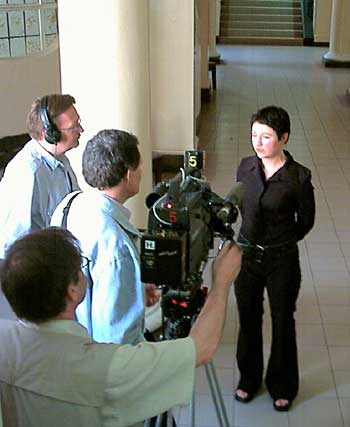
Dorota Nieznalska gives an interview at the District Court in Gdańsk (2 June 2003)

=== Prosecution and trial ===
Based on the notification of suspicion of committing a crime submitted by, among others, MP Robert Strąk and MP Gertruda Szumska, as well as private individuals, on 12 April 2002, the prosecutor filed an indictment with the District Court in Gdańsk, formulated under Article 196 of the criminal code:

Whoever offends the religious feelings of others by publicly insulting an object of religious worship or a place intended for the public performance of religious ceremonies shall be subject to a fine, restriction of liberty, or imprisonment for up to 2 years.

No preventive measure was applied to Nieznalska. The first hearing took place on 16 September 2002. Wojciech Cieślak served as Nieznalska's defense attorney throughout the entire process. (Note: Since Nieznalska was unable to pay for legal aid, the attorney agreed to accept several drawings by the artist as compensation (Grzebałkowska & Karaś (2011, p. 10)).) Witnesses who claimed their religious feelings had been offended were questioned. They admitted, however, that they had not personally seen the exhibition but were familiar with it only from an article in Gazeta Wyborcza and a television report by TVN. The installation, as evidence in the case, was secured by the prosecutor's office. Tomasz Pączek, a private individual, acted as an auxiliary prosecutor. Nieznalska did not admit to committing the alleged acts and consistently maintained throughout the entire process that she did not intend to offend religious feelings.

During the trial, there were multiple instances of the court's dignity being violated by the presence of the All-Polish Youth group in the courtroom, including shouting offensive and vulgar remarks directed at Nieznalska and displaying flags: red and white and white and blue. Members of the League of Polish Families gathered at the entrance to the courtroom with rosaries and crucifixes and sang religious hymns. The artist also received anonymous threatening phone calls and letters.

A letter in defense of the accused was signed by, among others, Anda Rottenberg, Zbigniew Libera, Alicja Żebrowska, and Artur Żmijewski. Nieznalska was also defended by Amnesty International and Culture Minister Waldemar Dąbrowski in television interviews.

On 18 July 2003, the district court in Gdańsk found Dorota Nieznalska guilty of offending religious feelings and sentenced her to six months of community sentence consisting of unpaid controlled work for social purposes at a rate of 20 hours per month.

After the verdict was announced, a letter in defense of the artist was written by Grzegorz Klaman and Aneta Szyłak, signed by, among others, Andrzej Turowski, Piotr Piotrowski, Wiesław Godzic, Kazimiera Szczuka, Maria Janion, Magdalena Tulli, and directors of Polish museums. Meanwhile, opponents of Nieznalska's installation issued a statement recognizing Pasja as an "anti-Christian provocation" and defending the court's verdict. The statement was signed by individuals such as Barbara Dobrzyńska, Grzegorz Górny, Janusz Kotański, Jacek Kowalski, Paweł Milcarek, Andrzej Nowak, Jan Pospieszalski, Maciej Pawlicki, and Piotr Semka.

The Catholic Church did not take an official position on the matter concerning Nieznalska.

=== Retrial and appeal ===
On 28 April 2004, the district court in Gdańsk overturned the verdict of the district court, citing a lack of proper justification and a restriction on the right to defense. The case was reconsidered by the district court.

For the first time, the court appointed expert witnesses in the field of art history, religious studies, and media studies; (Note: Appointing expert witnesses was difficult because all major Polish critics and art historians had already spoken publicly about Pasja, so their opinions could be challenged by the opposing side as lacking objectivity (Bernatowicz, Piotr (2009). "Paradoks Nieznalskiej". Arteon. 3: 6. ISSN 1508-3454.).) it reviewed the TVN documentary Trick and reconstructed the installation. There were 27 court hearings, with dozens of witnesses, including 20 aggrieved persons. During one of the hearings, the private prosecutor testified that after watching the TV footage and photos in the newspaper, he felt humiliated and mocked by the artist as a Catholic.

On 9 February 2005, during the third hearing, the court did not allow the presence of the public during the trial. Consequently, outside the courthouse, there was a picket by The Greens and the Reason of the Polish Left on the side of Nieznalska's supporters, and the League of Polish Families and the All-Polish Youth on the side of her opponents. The Helsinki Foundation for Human Rights also sent a representative to the trial.

On 4 June 2009, the district court in Gdańsk acquitted Nieznalska of the charge of offending religious feelings. In the oral reasons for the judgment, it was explained that the crime of offending religious feelings could only be committed with direct intent (i.e., such must have been the purpose of the actions taken), while Nieznalska acted with conditional intent (she suspected that her actions might offend religious feelings and accepted it). The judge also emphasized the role of the media, whose biased and tendentious coverage contributed to the negative reception of Pasja by viewers and the filing of the report to the prosecutor's office. The justification included the sentence: There is no way to answer the question of whether the offended persons would also feel offended if they saw the installation in its entirety and knew the artist's intentions.

Following this verdict, the prosecutor and the auxiliary prosecutor filed appeals to the higher court. By the judgment of 11 March 2010, the appealed acquittal verdict was upheld. In its reasoning, the appellate court confirmed the correctness of the lower court's opinion, accusing the media of manipulation: The aggrieved parties filed their report after the exhibition had ended, drawing their knowledge of its content from manipulated media reports that provided information about the case sporadically and in a scandalous atmosphere. According to the court, they did not have the opportunity to familiarize themselves with the artist's intentions and the context of her work. The spokesperson for TVN disagreed with these allegations.

The court's decision was criticized by right-wing circles and some lawyers. Piotr Kruszyński said that the fact that the aggrieved parties did not see the work is not a sufficient argument; it is an escape from the problem. According to Law and Justice MP Zbigniew Girzyński, the acquittal verdict in this case shows that one can offend the religious feelings of Catholics with impunity. The judgment was also criticized by the columnist Tomasz Terlikowski.

Following the final judgment of the district court, the prosecutor had the right to file a cassation appeal to the Supreme Court. The European Humanist Federation appealed to the Gdańsk-Śródmieście District Prosecutor's Office to abandon this intention.

The costs of the trial were borne by the state treasury.

== Effects of criminal proceedings ==
As a result of the scandal caused by Pasja installation and the court case, galleries belonging to the mainstream refused to exhibit Nieznalska's works. In an interview published in 2011, the author stated that she faced ostracism in the artistic community. She repeatedly applied for a scholarship from the Ministry of Culture, but only received it in 2009.

Three days before the announcement of the first verdict, Nieznalska photographed a whip made by herself with a strap and her own (cut) hair. The photograph is titled Hair N. before 18.07.03 and is part of a series of photos called Implantation of Perversions. In 2005, the artist created a black leather case for the cross, which was part of Pasja installation, with four zippers allowing for the regulation of the visibility of the photo hidden inside. She titled the case Fetish. Another direct reference to the trial was the exhibition 196 k.k., which took place in early 2012 at the Ego Gallery in Poznań.

Pasja installation, as evidence in the case, was kept in the court's custody for eight years. During the trial, Grażyna Kulczyk and Piotr Piotrowski, the director of the National Museum in Warsaw at the time, expressed interest in purchasing the installation. However, the transaction could not take place for legal reasons. After regaining possession of Pasja, Nieznalska declared that she wanted the installation to be placed in a Polish public institution rather than a private collection. Currently, it is in the artist's possession. Pasja has not been exhibited since the end of the trial.

Grzegorz Klaman commented on the trial in 2002 with a video titled 196 k.k., in which he reads offensive comments about Nieznalska posted on the trojmiasto.pl internet forum, slapping her and making her cry. A similar title (Paragraph 196 k.k.) is given to Dorota Nieznalska's work from 2010, in which the author, standing with her back to the viewer, whispers the dates of subsequent court hearings.

Wyspa Gallery, founded by Grzegorz Klaman and run by the Wyspa Progress Foundation, rented premises belonging to the Academy of Fine Arts in Gdańsk free of charge; on 29 January 2002, the senate, at the rector's request, refused to continue cooperation with the Foundation. According to Klaman, the reason for this decision was the scandal surrounding Pasja exhibition, but Prof. Sławoj Ostrowski of the Academy of Fine Arts claimed that economic reasons were the main factor.

Agata Araszkiewicz, writing for the magazine Obieg, compared Nieznalska's trial to the case of Rita Gorgonowa (due to what the author perceived as a similar atmosphere in which both criminal trials took place).

== Bibliography ==
- Kowalczyk, Izabela (2002). "Dorota Nieznalska: porozmawiajmy o mężczyznach". Niebezpieczne związki sztuki z ciałem. Poznań: Galeria Miejska Arsenał. ISBN 83-88947-01-X. OCLC 50602243.
- Grzebałkowska, Magdalena; Karaś, Dorota (2011-08-18). "Nieznalska na bramie". Duży Format (191). ISSN 1643-9910. Archived from the original on 2011-09-10.
- Kosiewski, Piotr (2003). "Kontra Nieznalska". Kresy (53). ISSN 0867-1125.
- Piotrowski, Piotr (2007). Sztuka według polityki: od Melancholii do Pasji. Kraków: Universitas. ISBN 978-83-242-0928-6. OCLC 228503537.
- Piotrowski, Piotr (2010). Agorafilia: sztuka i demokracja w postkomunistycznej Europie. Poznań: Dom Wydawniczy Rebis. ISBN 978-83-7510-551-3. OCLC 707099530.
- Romanska, Magda (2007-05-10). "The Anatomy of Blasphemy: Passion and the Trial of Dorota Nieznalska". The Drama Review. 194 (51). Massachusetts Institute of Technology: 176–181. doi:10.1162/dram.2007.51.2.176. ISSN 1054-2043.
- Kowalczyk, Izabela (2010). Matki-Polki, Chłopcy i Cyborgi...: sztuka i feminizm w Polsce. Poznań: Galeria Miejska "Arsenał". ISBN 978-83-61886-14-3. OCLC 726606272. Archived from the original on 2017-07-25.
- Kowalczyk, Marcin; Radomski, Andrzej; Bomba, Radosław (2010). "Profanacje, detronizacje, odwrócenia – karnawalizacja chrześcijańskiego sacrum w sztuce współczesnej". Granice w kulturze. Lublin: Wiedza i Edukacja (WiE).
- Dąbrowski, Jakub (2009). "Jednak niewinna". Arteon (7). ISSN 1508-3454.
