= Le Madame =

Club in Warsaw, Poland

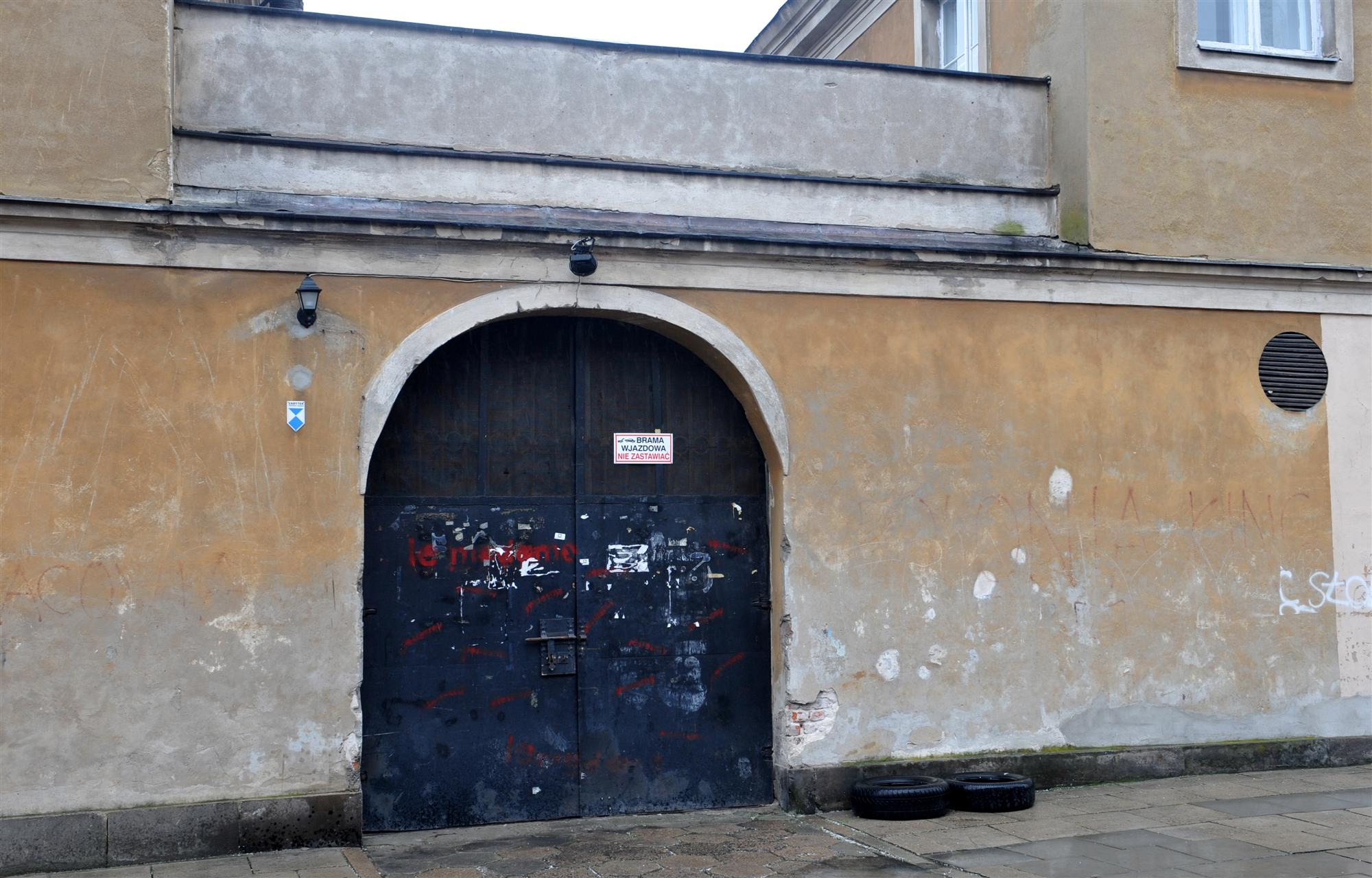
Entry gate to the club Le Madame (from Street Koźla in Warsaw)

Le Madame is a former club and gallery in the New Town neighbourhood of Warsaw, Poland. Established in 2003 by Krystian Legierski and Ela Stanowska under the name Gallery Le Madame, the club was located on Freta Street with entry gate by Koźla Street 12. The name of the club was based on the French language, purposefully changing the article from feminine to masculine.

== Description ==
The club Le Madame was used by many organizations and informal groups, including Greens 2004, Porozumienie Kobiet 8 Marca ('Agreement of Women of 8 March'), Kino Polska, the Wajda School, the Institute of Applied Social Sciences of the University of Warsaw, Pro Varsowia, TVN24, Stowarzysszenie Drama ('Association Drama') and the Polish Association of Rationalists. In 2005, club Le Madame received an award from Gazeta Wyborcza for location of the year for 2004, "Wdechy 2004". In Le Madame concerts, exhibitions and theatre plays took place. Until March 2006, the club hosted about 60 theatres, including TR Warszawa. The activities of the club were criticized by the right-wing local government.

== Closure ==
Le Madame's lease was signed with Eureka, a company belonging to the government. In a March 2005, Eureka lost a trial with the city of Warsaw, losing the ownership rights for the tenement house in which Le Madame was housed. The new owner, the city of Warsaw, decided to not honor the existing rental agreements. For a year, the owners tried to uphold the club in its location. The city gave the club no bills of rent until January 2006, when it delivered the accumulated bills and the club owners questioned the sum.

In March 2006, a debt collector appeared in the establishment. For a few days, club attendants, supporters, politicians and artists protested in Le Madame. American actor John Malkovich supported the club, as he was in Warsaw at the time. On 31 March, the debt collector appeared, escorted by the police. Protesters were removed from the venue by force, and the club was legally closed. According to the club owners and their supporters, the closing of the club was not related to the debts, but instead the ruling party Law and Justice. The local government opposed that idea.

The story of the occupation and eviction is featured in the 2006 short film Le Ma! by Joanna Rajkowska.

The court proceeding for the execution of debt including interest (600,000 zł, about €150,000) ended in 2018 with the city's loss.
