= Przemysław Czarnek =

Polish politician and academic

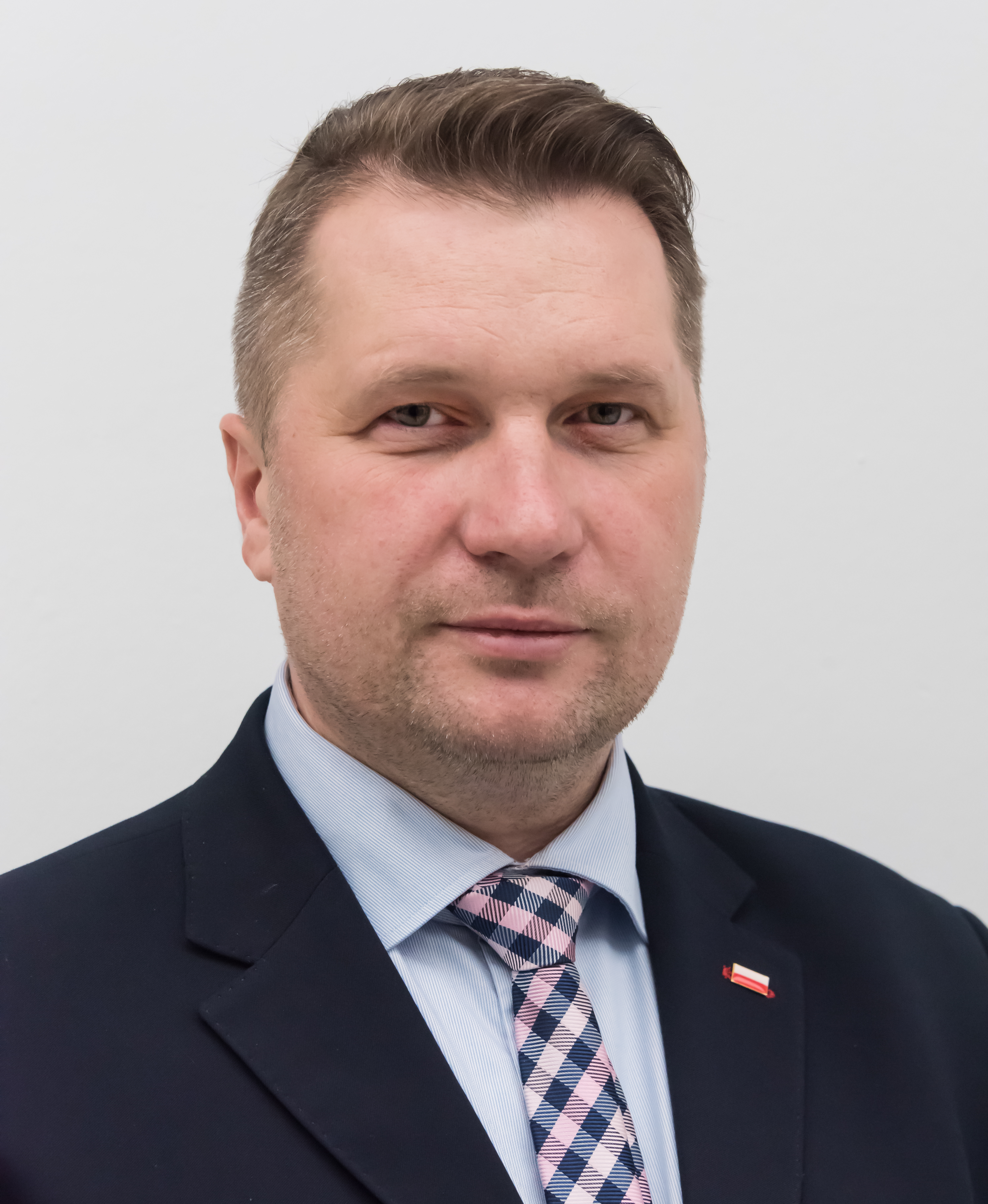
- Official portrait, 2019

Minister of Education and Science
- In office 19 October 2020 – 27 November 2023
- Prime Minister: Mateusz Morawiecki
- Preceded by: Dariusz Piontkowski (MEN); Wojciech Murdzek (MNiSW)
- Succeeded by: Krzysztof Szczucki

9th Voivode of Lublin
- In office 8 December 2015 – 11 November 2019
- Prime Minister: Beata Szydło; Mateusz Morawiecki
- Preceded by: Wojciech Wilk
- Succeeded by: Lech Sprawka

Personal details
- Born: 11 June 1977 (age 49) Koło, Poland
- Party: Law and Justice
- Spouse: Katarzyna Czarnek
- Children: 2
- Education: John Paul II Catholic University of Lublin

Przemysław Czarnek (born 11 June 1977) is a Polish politician and academic who was the Polish Minister of Education and Science from 2020 to 2023. He was voivode of the Lubelskie Voivodeship from 2015 to 2019 and elected in 2019 as a member of the 9th Sejm as a member of Law and Justice.

Czarnek is notable for his opposition to LGBT rights, his controversial comments on women's rights, and supporting corporal punishment for children. He unsuccessfully competed for his party's nomination in the 2025 Polish presidential election.

On 7 March 2026 Czarnek was named as the Law and Justice (PiS) party's candidate for the office of Prime Minister for the Next Polish parliamentary election.

== Childhood and education ==
Czarnek was born on 11 June 1977 in Koło. He grew up in Goszczanów in the county of Sieradz in the Łódź Voivodeship of western Poland. His mother was a nurse and his father was a truck driver. He moved to Lublin to live with an uncle at the age of 15. He graduated with a law degree at the John Paul II Catholic University of Lublin (KUL) in 2001, obtained his doctorate in constitutional law from KUL in 2006, and obtained his habilitation at KUL in 2015. He married Katarzyna Czarnek, with whom he had two children.

== Academic career ==
Czarnek was appointed as a university professor at KUL on 1 October 2019. According to an analysis by OKO.press, at the time Czarnek's publications had no citations in Scopus, only three citations of his habilitation thesis in Google Scholar. Overall, Czarnek is the author of 19 academic publications according to the Polish Scientific Bibliography.

Czarnek was awarded a medal for services rendered to Maria Curie-Skłodowska University (UMCS) on 28 October 2019. During the award ceremony, activist Anna Dąbrowska held up a banner "Medal for the hater – shame". UMCS staff member Tomasz Kitliński said that the decision to award the medal had not been consulted with university staff and was a surprise and that it took place in a context of decreased democracy within the university. Kitliński also stated in an online post: "The governor of Lublin Region prides himself in offending Ukrainians, Muslims, the LGBT community and women, for whom he sees no social role other than the reproduction of children". Czarnek sued Kitliński for allegedly slandering a public official. Art professionals started an online petition to support Kitliński.

== Political career ==
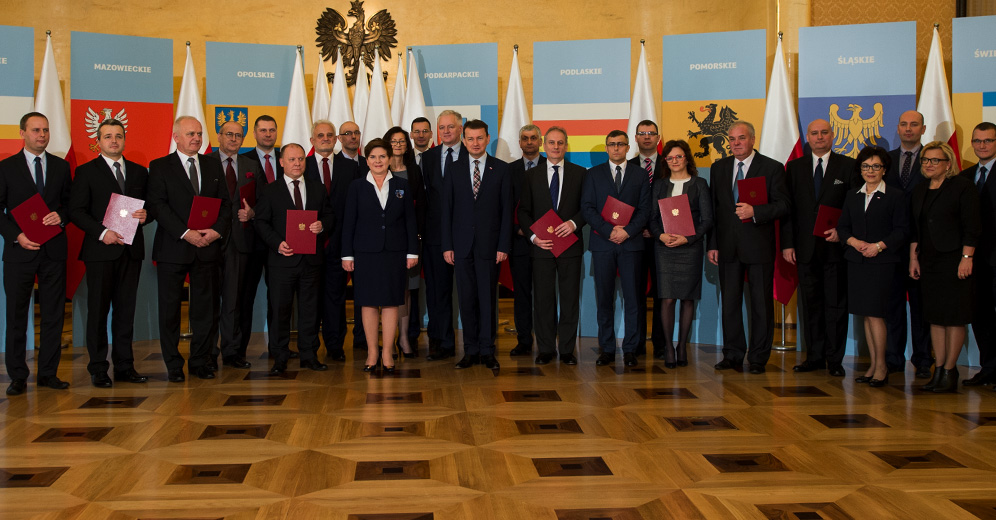
Czarnek (fifth from the left) at the ceremony of designating voivodes.

Czarnek was appointed as the voivode of the Lublin Voivodeship in 2015. He was elected as a member of parliament in the 2019 Polish parliamentary election, resigning from his position as voivode. In the 2023 parliamentary election he was reelected to the Sejm.

=== Minister of Science and Education ===
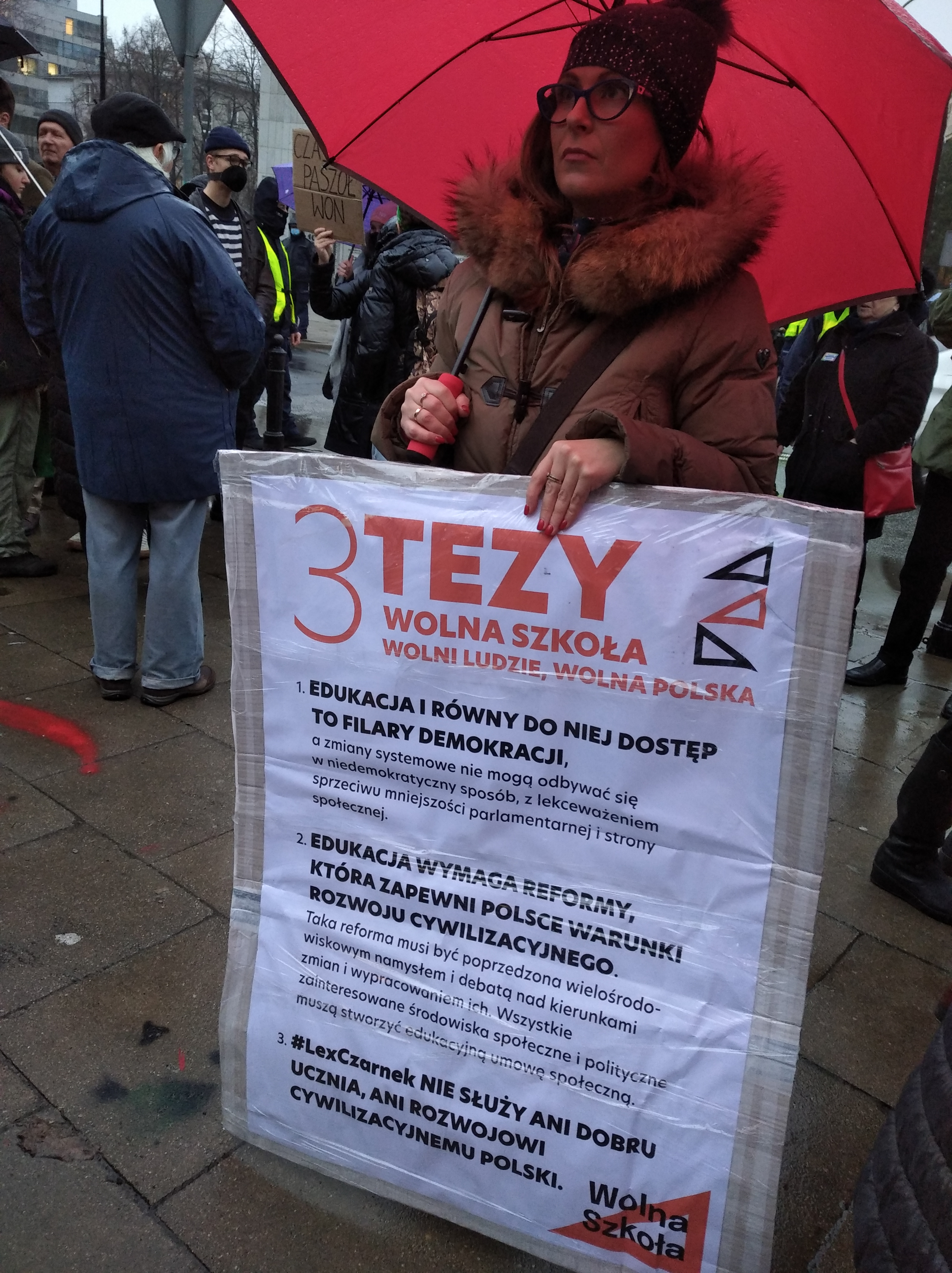
January 2022 protest against "Lex Czarnek" (term mentioned on the poster).

In early October 2020, Czarnek was announced as the likely new minister of education and science (which was earlier divided into the Ministry of Science and Higher Education, MNISW, and the Ministry of National Education, MEN), shortly before he tested positive for SARS-CoV-2. His nomination was delayed after his SARS-CoV-2 positive status was announced. Czarnek was formally appointed Minister of Science and Education on 19 October 2020.

The heads of 79 universities in Poland released a joint statement criticizing Czarnek's proposed reforms, arguing that they infringed on the autonomy of the universities and obstructed academic freedom while allowing pseudoscientific views to be taught in universities.

In 2021 the Czarnek's Ministry proposed a reform of the Polish educational system, dubbed in Polish media "Lex Czarnek". It has been described as controversial due to its implied criticism of the teachings on liberal issues such as LGBT rights and sex education, and was vetoed by the President in 2022.

A 2020 international petition signed by more than 170 academics called for an international boycott of Czarnek for his "homophobic, xenophobic and misogynistic views," and hundreds of Polish academics have called for his dismissal on similar grounds. He has denied the claims of the petitions, claiming that he cannot be misogynistic due to his respect for the Virgin Mary and his wife. School students went on strike and held street protests in late 2020 calling for Czarnek's dismissal, arguing that he was "politicising the education system".

=== 2025 presidential election ===
Czarnek competed for his party's nomination in the 2025 presidential election. His most prominent opponents for the nomination were MEP Tobiasz Bocheński and Institute of National Remembrance director Karol Nawrocki. Ultimately, the party nominated Nawrocki, who won the presidential election.

== Political views ==
=== Social issues ===
Prior to the 2018 Equality March in Lublin in favor of LGBT rights and the rights of other minorities including the disabled, refugees, ethnic minorities and religious minorities, Czarnek described the march as promoting "perversion, deviance and denaturing" and called for the march to be forbidden by the authorities.

Czarnek described the 2018 Lublin Equality March as "promoting pedophilia", and said that it should be banned, in contrast to the right of freedom of assembly. Polish Ombudsman Adam Bodnar stated that this can be considered hate speech against participants in the march. Bartosz Staszewski, one of the organizers of the march, sued Czarnek, demanding that Czarnek publicly apologize. The court ruled that he had to apologize, but then he repeated the statement.

During the 2020 Polish presidential election campaign Czarnek stated in a live television broadcast that "[we] should stop listening to this nonsense about human rights, or any equality. These people [LGBT] are not equal to normal people". According to The Guardian, this was "the most homophobic outburst so far" from a member of the ruling party. The Polish National Broadcasting Council stated that Czarnek's statement was legal under Polish law.

On 3 August 2020, Czarnek stated that it was certain that "LGBT ideology was derived from neo-Marxism and came from the same roots as German Hitlerian national socialism." When asked in an interview if anti-LGBT rhetoric would lead to young people developing mental health issues, he responded that those issues were not due to anti-LGBT rhetoric but rather "propaganda and LGBT ideology."

On the issue of women's rights, Czarnek has expressed disapproval of women prioritizing career over children, declaring that "Career first, maybe later a child, leads to tragic consequences. If the first child is not born [when the mother is aged] 20–25 years, only at the age of 30, how many children can [the mother] bear? Those are the consequences of telling a woman that she doesn't have to do what she was destined to do by the Lord God."

One of Czarnek's research themes is that corporal punishment for children is allowed by the Polish constitution, as he says it is a method of raising children.

In relation to artistic freedom, Czarnek wrote in a publication that "There is also a lack of justification for privileging artistic freedom and freedom of speech at the cost of religious freedom and the associated right to protection of religious sentiment".

=== Political views ===
Czarnek is a supporter of the ultra-conservative Catholic organization Ordo Iuris.

In 2019, the Peter Tatchell Foundation described Czarnek as "a prominent mouthpiece for far-right prejudice". In 2020, professor of theology Alfred Wierzbicki criticized Czarnek as "emanating from the extreme right [akin to the] National Radical Camp". According to Balkan Insight, Czarnek spoke at some far-right events.

=== Historical views ===
In July 2018, a commemoration of the Sahryń massacre, in which hundreds of Ukrainian civilians were killed by the Polish Home Army on 10 March 1944, was held. Czarnek described the commemoration as a "great provocation". He officially informed the police that the commemoration was, according to him, a crime by the president of the Lublin Ukrainians' Association under the Act on the Institute of National Remembrance.

In 2019, Czarnek opposed a memorial by Polish artist Dorota Nieznalska that commemorated Jews who were killed by Poles during and after the Holocaust. He called the memorial a "scandal" and "anti-Polish" and said that it should be removed. Tomasz Kitliński, who commissioned the memorial, refused to comply.

In the aftermath of the Yaroslav Hunka scandal Czarnek stated in a Twitter post that he had taken steps towards the possible extradition of Hunka. Czarnek asked the Institute of National Remembrance to urgently research whether Hunka was wanted for "crimes against the Polish Nation and Poles of Jewish origin".
