= Agnieszka Szpila =

Polish writer and activist (born 1977)

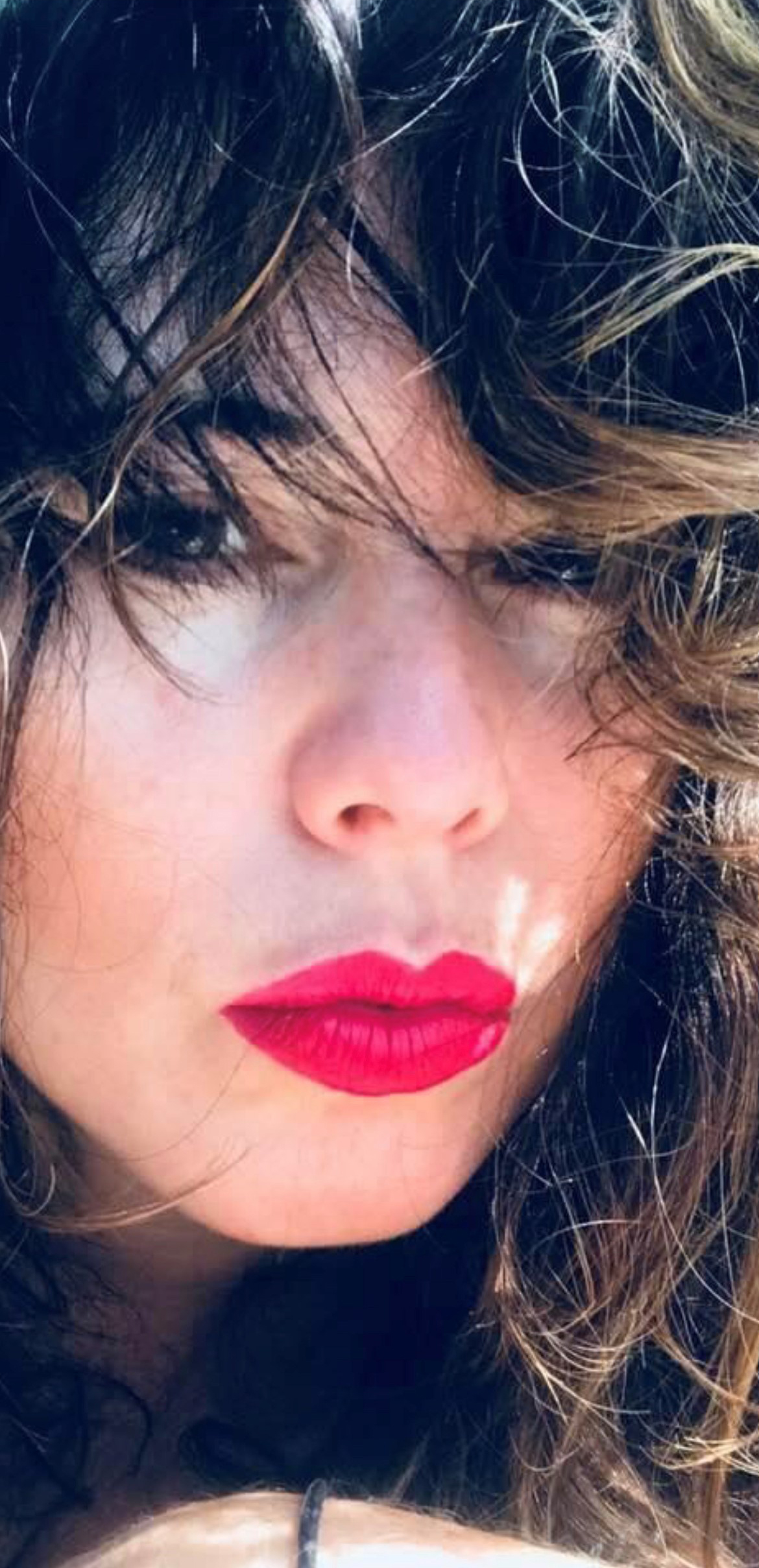
- Agnieszka Szpila, 2021
- Born: 1977 (age 48–49); Wałbrzych
- Citizenship: Polish
- Occupations: Writer, activist

Agnieszka Szpila (born 1977) is a writer, screenwriter and activist.

She was awarded the 2022 Grand Press award in "Opinion Journalism", for her "Krytyka Polityczna" piece titled "Where Are the Kids? Up the Ass!" ("Gdzie są te dzieci? W dupie!"), but she refused to accept the award.

== Biography ==
She attended the high school in Wałbrzych. She graduated in cultural studies from the University of Wrocław.

Her first book Łebki od szpilki (2015), described the experiences of a single parent raising children with intellectual disabilities. In 2014, Ewa Golis produced a documentary film, Szpila, about raising autistic children.

In 2022, she was nominated for the Nike Literary Award, for Heksy,

She is a columnist for the parenting magazine GaGa. She ran the blog "U Autystek". She writes articles for outlets including "Krytyka Polityczna".

== Books ==
- Łebki od szpilki. W.A.B. 2015. ISBN 978-83-280-1497-8.
- Bardo. W.A.B. 2018. ISBN 978-83-280-3601-7.
- Heksy. W.A.B. 2021. ISBN 978-83-280-9089-7.
  - Szpila, Agnieszka; Gilroy, Scotia (2026). Hexes of the deadwood forest. New York: Pantheon Books. ISBN 978-0-593-70089-1.
- Octopussy. Opowiadania postporno. W.A.B. 2023. ISBN 978-83-8318-622-1.

== Filmography ==
- Szpila, 2014, documentary film, main character
- Czarne stokrotki, 2024, screenwriter
