= Christian Kobluk =

Polish essayist, writer, and human rights activist (born 2000)

- Born: 2000
- Occupations: essayist, writer and human rights activist

Christian Kobluk (born 2000) is an essayist, writer and human rights activist.

== Biography ==
He made his debut in 2016 with a short story in the literary yearbook Pomosty. He studied sociology at the University of Wrocław. In 2025 he was the press spokesman of the Polish delegation to the Global Sumud Flotilla.

Contributing editor in Wobec magazine. Former refugee rights advisor in the Office of the Member of Sejm Tomasz Aniśko. He has been writing for, among others, Pismo, Krytyka Polityczna, Cosmonaut Magazine, Kongresy, Nowy Obywatel, Kontakt, Równość and Ecosprinter.

== Books ==
- Zapiski czarnego Polaka. Instytut Wydawniczy Książka i Prasa. 2022. ISBN 9788366615465.
- A Zone of Nonbeing. A Black Pole's Reflections on Racism in Poland. Daraja Press. 2025. ISBN 978-1-998309-42-9.
