= Dorota Nieznalska =

Polish visual artist and sculptor (born 1973)

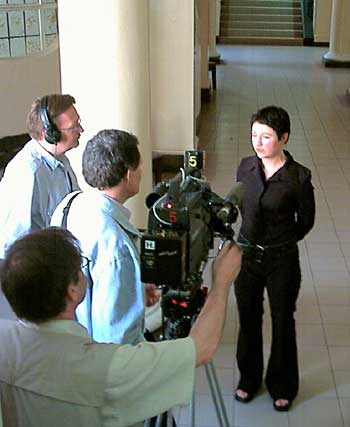
Dorota Nieznalska 2003

Dorota Alicja Nieznalska (born 19 September 1973) is a Polish visual artist and sculptor.

Nieznalska's controversial installation Pasja (2002), which included the placement of an image of the penis upon a metal Greek cross, resulted in a notable scandal, as the display was condemned as immoral and blasphemous by Polish conservative Catholics. The group exhibition at which the installation was presented was closed down by the authorities, while Nieznalska herself faced legal charges on account of an alleged violation of a provision of the Polish criminal code prohibiting blasphemy.

The sculptor was successful in fighting off the blasphemy conviction following the favorable ruling of an appeals court in 2009.

== Early life ==
Dorota Alicja Nieznalska was born to a devout family in Gdańsk in 1973. Raised in the Gdańsk-Gdynia–Sopot Tricity area, Nieznalska was educated at an art high school in Gdynia Orłowo. Nieznalska enrolled at Gdańsk's Academy of Fine Arts as a student of sculpture in 1993, a year after making her first solo exhibition in her native city. Nieznalska's fine arts instructors were the Professors Franciszek Duszeńko and Grzegorz Klaman. Nieznalska graduated from the academy in 1999 and exhibited a number of student works (Insemination, 1997; The Pleasure Principle, 1998; Absolution, 1999) in the 1990s. She subsequently participating in three major exhibitions in Gdańsk, Warsaw, and Białystok in 2000 and 2001.

== Pasja (2002) ==
Blasphemy charges were levelled against Nieznalska after an exhibition featuring the 2002 work Pasja ("Passion"), an artistic installation concerned with the themes of masculinity and suffering. The installation was displayed at the experimental Gdańsk, Wyspa Gallery, an institution associated with the academy, and consisted of two elements: a large Greek cross made of metal was suspended from the ceiling of the gallery, and covered; its center was filled in with an image of a man's hips, thighs, and penis. Behind the cross, the viewer's attention was drawn to a large video, its display projecting from an overhead angle the face and shoulders of a grimacing man in the act of weight-lifting. The viewer's inability to behold the man's body, his other body parts being cut off from the screen, concocted an effect of ambiguity as to the activity of the man on the screen, suggesting that the man's feeling of torment could have been the effect of other kinds of activity. The installation would be described by some as depicting "the penis of Christ" in the ensuing controversy.

== Legal charges of blasphemy ==
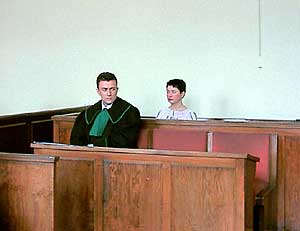
Dorota Nieznalska in court

Gdańsk activists of the right-wing League of Polish Families began a petition to the local authorities to open a legal case following the release of television footage of the exhibition. Complaints about Pasja led to Nieznalska's being summoned to report to the local police on 2 March 2002. The city's rightist municipal councilors quickly closed the exhibition while the young artist, insisting that her intention was to focus on "the cult of the male body", became the defendant of a trial concerning Nieznalska's alleged violation of the criminal code. Nieznalska's upcoming exhibits in Słupsk and Ostrów Wielkopolski were cancelled after further intervention from the League of Polish Families. Members of the nationalist youth group Młodzież Wszechpolska threatened to "hang such artists" and "shave their heads, like the Home Army did with women who were in close relationships with [the] Germans"

At the conclusion of the first legal process in 2003, the court found Nieznalska guilty of "offending religious feelings", a violation of the ban on blasphemy within Article 196 of the criminal code. Judge Tomasz Zieliński denied that Nieznalska's work was entitled to any special constitutional protection as an object of art, stating that "the fact that a work is within the boundaries of art has no significance for whether it can offend the feelings of other people." The court ordered Nieznalska to perform six months of unpaid community service. The trial prosecutor had originally demanded a fine of 2000 złoty, but the court decided to increase the penalty. Judge Zieliński additionally forbade Nieznalska from traveling out of the country. The local deputies of the League of Polish Families present during the sentencing clapped to express their approval.

Controversy surrounding Nieznalska's installation, already boiling during the initial trial, persisted well into the appeals process. An unsigned editorial in Poland's Anglophone monthly The Warsaw Voice, summing up the court case shortly after the initial verdict as a battle between the left and right - albeit "the first of its kind" for modern Poland - treated Nieznalska as "a tasteless provocateur, covering up her lack of genuine talent with shock tactics" and cited the opinion of Franciszek Starowieyski, "one of the best-known Polish sculptors, himself rather partial to unconventional works", who "said before the beginning of the lawsuit that the one to blame was not the novice artist but the curator of the Gdańsk gallery. According to Starowieyski, Nieznalska's installation was of such a low artistic standard that it should never have been exhibited. Many other known artists, while not approving of the sentence, agreed that if not for the scandal, Nieznalska's work would have stood little chance of making it into reputable galleries." The former president Lech Wałęsa spoke out against Nieznalska and supported a hard line, maintaining that the artist's sentence was insufficiently severe. The fine arts professors supporting the Wyspa exhibitions decided to atone for the mistake by closing the gallery.

The more liberal sections of Polish society stood up in support of the sculptor's right to free artistic expression. A letter of protest signed by about 1500 artists, professionals, and other concerned citizens argued for "civic freedoms" and art as "one sphere" of "freedom, incorrectness, difference." An opinion piece by Andrzej Osęka for the liberal daily Gazeta Wyborcza compared the Nieznalska case to the 2005 Jyllands-Posten controversy in Denmark, noting that whereas the Danish newspaper suffered no legal consequences on account of its publication of a cartoon deliberately offensive to the Muslim faith in spite of loud outcries from Muslim communities around the world, Nieznalska's case had resulted in a campaign of legal intimidation because of poor legislation and the judges' deference to the politicians. The Adam Mickiewicz University art historian Pawel Leszkowicz compared Nieznalska to Alicja Zebrowska and Katarzyna Kozyra, two other female artists attacked for immoral works in the 1990s.

Two former Wyspa staff - curator Aneta Szylak and director Grzegorz Klaman, Nieznalska's former instructor - wrote that while "[s]ince the times of Plato, the academy [had been] a place for intellectual and artistic discourse", the principle "was broken when the gallery closed... Because she had the courage to show 'Pasja', Nieznalska had her scholarships and subsidies cut off; she has been stigmatized and censored... A spectacular political sham is [the League of Polish Families'] typical marketing strategy, and the judge acted just like they wanted him to."

Nieznalska was acquitted after an arduous process and multiple appeals in June 2009. The Gazeta Wyborcza hailed the decision as "a toast to freedom."

The European Humanist Federation has alleged that Polish prosecutors have been trying to revive the case in 2010. Polish reports denied that Nieznalska would be subjected to a third trial, emphasizing the acquittal as binding.
