= Ladewig =

Ladewig is a German language surname. It stems from the male given name Ludwig – and may refer to:

- Marion Ladewig (1914–2010), American ten-pin bowler
- Wilhelm Ladewig (1906–1979), German athlete

== See also ==
- Ladwig
