= Adam Ostolski =

Polish sociologist, columnist and activist

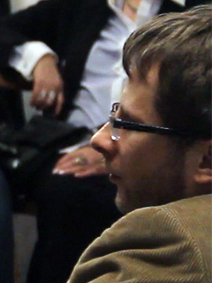
Image of Adam Ostolski

Adam Edward Ostolski (born 7 November 1978) is a Polish sociologist, columnist and activist. He is a member of the Krytyka Polityczna and a member of the editorial board of the Green European Journal. In 2013-2016 he was co-leader of Poland's Green Party.

He graduated from the Department of Philosophy and Sociology at the University of Warsaw. In 2011, he defended his doctoral dissertation Trauma and Public Memory: The Legacy of World War Two in Contemporary Poland. He lectured at the Medical University of Warsaw (2009-2013) and since 2013 he has been a faculty member (assistant professor) at the University of Warsaw. He was a visiting professor at the University of Jena in 2022 and a visiting researcher at the Centre français de recherche en sciences sociales (CEFRES) in Prague in 2023. His research interests include social movements, gendered nationalism, memory studies and sociology of knowledge. He authored a study comparing antisemitic and anti-gay discourses in contemporary Poland. He translated into Polish books by Immanuel Wallerstein, Étienne Balibar, Shmuel Eisenstadt and Judith Butler.

Ostolski was an environmental activist since the early 1990s. He is a member of the left-wing milieu Krytyka Polityczna since the establishment of the group in 2002. He was also a member of the Poland's Green Party, and in 2013-2016 its co-leader (first with Agnieszka Grzybek, then with Małgorzata Tracz). He left the party in February 2019.

In 2012, he wrote a column in the weekly Przekrój. He appeared in the film "What Is Democracy?" by Oliver Ressler (2009).
