= The Greens (Poland) =

Polish political party

The Greens Zieloni
- Secretary: Waldemar Kamiński
- Spokesperson: Michał Suchora
- Co-Chairs: Michał Suchora; Magdalena Gałkiewicz
- Founded: 6 September 2003
- Headquarters: Piękna Street 1b/22; 00-539 Warsaw
- Youth wing: Young Greens
- Membership (2022): ~750
- Ideology: Green politics Liberalism; Social liberalism Alter-globalization
- Political position: Centre-left
- National affiliation: Civic Coalition; Senate Pact 2023 (for 2023 Senate election)
- European affiliation: European Green Party
- European Parliament group: European Greens–European Free Alliance
- International affiliation: Global Greens
- Colours: Green
- Sejm: 2 / 460 (0.4%)
- Senate: 0 / 100
- European Parliament: 0 / 53
- Regional assemblies: 1 / 552 (0.2%)

Website
- partiazieloni.pl
- Politics of Poland; Political parties; Elections; A: The party has also been described as centrist, or left-wing.

The Greens (Polish: Zieloni [ʑɛˈlɔ.ɲi]) is a green political party in Poland. Formed in 2003 under the name Greens 2004 and formally registered itself in February 2004, the party advocates green politics, liberalism, social liberalism, alongside anti-clericalism and alter-globalism. It has been described as centrist, centre-left, or left-wing.

The party is an international member of the Global Greens, European member of European Green Party and cooperates with the European Greens–European Free Alliance in the European Parliament. It remains as the only green political party in Poland, following the dissolution of other such parties; the Polish Green Party and the Party of the Greens. Since 2019 the party has been a member of the Civic Coalition.

== History ==
Logo of The Greens until November 2022

=== Early years (2003—2009) ===
The party was established in 2003 by activists of several social movements. Among its founding members were environmentalists, feminists, LGBT people and anti-war activists. The first political campaign of the emerging party concerned the Polish European Union membership referendum, the Greens campaigned for a "yes" vote.

Greens 2004 took part in the movement against the Iraq War in 2003 and participated in Equality Parades and other social protests in the time of "Fourth Republic" (2005–2007). In 2004, the party ran independently at the 2004 European Parliament election, getting 0.27% of the total votes.

In the aftermath of the 2004 election, the party begun cooperating with other left-wing formations, notably the Social Democracy of Poland. In the 2005 presidential election, the Greens supported the chairman of SDPL, Marek Borowski, who received 10.33% of the votes. Later, Greens and the Union of Labour contested on the lists of the Social Democrats for the 2005 parliamentary election, alltogether achieving 3.89% of the vote and failing to enter the parliament.

Following the 2005 election, the party ended their cooperation with SDPL, rejecting the invitation to partake in an alliance of the Left and Democrats. In the 2006 local elections, the Greens ran independently in Warsaw received 11 210 votes (1.68%) and 7th place out of 14. Less than 1% of support was obtained in Wrocław and Gdańsk by the local committees co-created by the Greens with Young Socialists. In other cities, people associated with the party were candidates from local, mainly non-party lists or the Left and Democrats coalition. In the 2007 parliamentary election, the Greens contested the Senate District No. 30, winning 4.55% of the total vote share and failing to secure the seat.

=== Left-wing coalitions (2009—2018) ===
In February 2009, the Greens formed a coalition called Alliance for the Future (Porozumienie dla Przyszłości - CentroLewica) with the social liberal Democratic Party and the social democratic SDPL, forming a common list for the 2009 European Parliament election. The alliance would go on to secure only 2.44% of the total vote, failing to gain any seats.

In the 2010 presidential election, the Greens supported Grzegorz Napieralski based on the analysis of the programs of the most important candidates. The SLD candidate obtained the highest score in the Green Index ranking: 78 on a scale from -200 to +200 points. In the second round, the party members encouraged to vote, but they did not support any of the candidates, pointing to their conservatism and economic neoliberalism. In the 2010 local elections, members of the Greens ran in most cases from the lists of Democratic Left Alliance. In these elections, the Greens won five seats in local councils and regional parliaments.

In the 2011 parliamentary election, representatives of the party again found themselves on the lists of the Democratic Left Alliance, but they did not obtain any seats in the Sejm. The Green candidates themselves gained 23 421 votes, which gave 0.16% of the votes. The only one of the Greens was their chairman Dariusz Szwed opening the list in the Chrzanów constituency, in which he obtained 3 842 votes.

On 3 March 2013, the party officially renamed itself into The Greens (Zieloni), keeping the previous Greens 2004 as a historical name that can still be used. By the mid-2010s, the party lost many of its more left-wing members (e. g. Marcelina Zawisza), who formed new party called Razem (Together).

In the 2014 European Parliament election, the Greens formed their own Election Committee of the Greens. The representatives of the Women's Party, the Polish Socialist Party and Young Socialists have announced the start of the Green Committee's lists. The Committee registered lists in five districts. The Committee of the Greens obtained 22 221 votes (0.32%) in the elections, taking the 10th place (ahead of, among others, the Direct Democracy committee, whose lists were registered in six districts).

In the 2014 local elections, the party ran independently in Warsaw and Wrocław, while joining broader coalitions in Kraków, Opole, and Lubusz voivodeship. Their independent efforts resulted in 2.55% of the city council vote and 2.48% for the mayoral candidate Joanna Erbel in Warsaw. In coalition races however, the Kraków Against the Olympic Committee won 6.7% of the vote, with 4.84% for mayoral candidate Tomasz Leśniak.

Despite failing to obtain any seats in the previous election, former Palikot's Movement MP Anna Grodzka joined the Greens in 2014, representing the party in the Sejm for a year. The party attempted to register Grodzka as their candidate in the 2015 presidential election, who, however, did not collect the required number of 100 000 signatures. For the 2015 parliamentary election, the Greens joined a broad electoral alliance United Left (Zjednoczona Lewica). In the election the alliance received 7.6% of the vote, below the 8% electoral threshold leaving the alliance with no parliamentary representation. It was officially dissolved in February 2016.

=== Cooperation with the Civic Coalition (2018—Today) ===
In the 2018 local elections, the Greens, without any electoral alliance, managed to obtain the highest ever result in their party history of 1.15% of the votes, with their highest result as a percentage in Lubusz voivodeship (2.62%), and the highest local Gmina result being in Gmina Żary (10.0%). Since the election, the party began to cooperate with Civic Platform and Modern parties as part of the Civic Coalition. At the end of July 2019, the party announced their intent to participate in the 2019 Polish parliamentary election as part of the Civic Coalition, winning three seats in Sejm. Despite failing to enter the European parliament in 2019 as part of the European Coalition, the party aided and supported a former Spring deputy Sylwia Spurek following her decision to join the European Greens faction.

On 8 March 2023, Klaudia Jachira, previously independent representative within Civic Platform, joined The Greens. In the 2023 parliamentary election, the party as part of the Civic Coalition secured 3 seats, joining the governing coalition. Running as part of the coalition in the 2024 local elections, the party secured representation in few city councils (notably in Szczecin, Łodź, Wrocław, Gdynia, Zielona Góra, Milanówek i Puławy), and one mandate in the West Pomeranian Voivodeship Sejmik.

In February of 2025, former party leader Małgorzata Tracz suspended her membership, leaving the party by September 20 and reducing its representation to 2 MPs. She cited a loss of alignment with the party's program as one of the reasons. Later in the year, despite being a member of the Civic Coalition, the party was not invited to participate in the merger of other members of the Civic Coalition into a single party, though they later expressed unwillingness to join regardless.

In 2026 the party co-organized a citizens initiative "Watch Out! Hunting" (Uwaga! Polowanie), aimed at reforming hunting laws by restricting hunting methods, banning commercial hunts, and expanding buffer zones around residential areas. The proposal gathered 204,000 signatures and was submitted to the Sejm in September 2026, where it underwent record-breaking public consultations that drew heavy opposition from hunters and other agricultural groups before its first reading.

== Principles and policies ==
The framework for Green policies, called The Green Manifesto, was adopted by the founding congress of the party on 6 and 7 September 2003. The Green Manifesto outlined the principles of green politics in seven areas: social justice and solidarity, civil society and reclaiming the state for citizens, environmental protection and sustainable development, gender equality, respect for national, cultural and religious diversity, protecting minority rights, and non-violent conflict resolution.

At the 4th Congress in April 2011, the Greens 2004 adopted elaborated policy documents concerning the principles of social policy, education policy, and health care policy.

=== Current policies ===
The current official policies approved during the party's XI Congress:

"Protection of Earth resources is our obligation"

1. The total departure from obtaining energy from oil, coal and other fossil fuels and obtaining it in at least 50% from renewable energy sources by 2030.
2. Resignation from plans for the construction of nuclear power plants.
3. Supporting efforts to reduce global greenhouse gas emissions by at least 40% by 2030 compared to 1990 levels.
4. Increase energy efficiency by 45% by 2050 to combat air pollution, energy poverty and combating climate change.
5. Completion of production and sale of new combustion vehicles by 2030 and replacement with non-standard vehicles.
6. Establishment of a national program for the construction and reconstruction of railway connections for 2020–2030.
7. Protection of current and gradual increase of existing valuable natural areas, e.g. Białowieża Forest.
8. Protection of water resources and their rational use through proper retention and saving.
9. Prohibition of animal husbandry for fur and circuses with animals.

"Good governance economy"

1. Introduction of an economy model based on such values as human rights, solidarity, the rule of law, ecological responsibility and democracy.
2. Circular economy (secondary use of raw materials) and promotion of conscious consumer choices.
3. Guarantee of places in nurseries and kindergartens, enabling parents to return to the labor market.
4. Begin the process of gradually shortening the work week to 30 hours per week.
5. The gradual introduction of basic guaranteed income.
6. Opposition to the construction of the German-Russian Nord Stream 2 gas pipeline.
7. Equal pay for men and women.
8. Limiting wage redistribution in Europe and guaranteeing a minimum European pension.
9. Prohibition of advertisements directed to children and promoting parapharmaceutical products.

"Equality and solidarity being everyone's right"

1. Fighting against racial, religious and ideological discrimination as well as the reasons for the escape of people from their countries.
2. Prohibition of arms exports to conflict regions.
3. The right to breathe clean air.
4. Active help for people suffering from exclusion from traffic and random events.
5. Dissemination of nursing, dental and psychological care in nurseries, kindergartens and schools.
6. Support for seniors raising children and carers of people with disabilities.
7. Introduction of parish properties by same-sex couples.
8. Equal retirement age for women and men at the age of 65 with the possibility of retirement earlier by 5 years.
9. Lowering the active electoral law to the age of 16 in local elections.
10. Legal admissibility of euthanasia for terminally ill people, who will express their will to end their lives.

"Good quality food based on sustainable development"

1. Moving away from industrial animal husbandry, moving to agriculture without chemical poisons by 2040 and not allowing GMO.
2. Support for organic farming as well as local and direct sale of agricultural products.
3. Protection of the durability of family farms and protection of social rights of farmers and farmers as well as employees and employees in the farm.
4. Education and raising public awareness of issues related to food consumption and its impact on human health - especially diseases such as obesity, diabetes, allergies.
5. A more just system of subsidies for all agriculture and increased subsidies for sustainable and local agriculture.

=== Policies formulated in previous years ===
In the past, the Greens in their manifestos have declared, among others:

- sustainable economic, social and ecological development;
- energy model based on energy efficiency and prosumer renewable energy;
- social justice and the elimination of inequality;
- maintaining the separation of churches and religious associations from the state;
- the right of women to legal abortion;
- introduction of registered partnerships (available for both homosexual and heterosexual persons);
- drug policy based on education and prevention, not punishment;
- maintaining state education and health care;
- withdrawal of Polish troops from Afghanistan;
- urban policy based on public services, active housing policy, development of accessible public transport, support for universal and accessible education, health and culture, respect for greenery and ecosystems;
- sustainable development of rural areas, support for organic farming, total elimination of GMOs.

The Greens, due to their pacifist stance, also oppose the restoration of the death penalty and the introduction of a flat tax, as well as the construction of elements of US anti-missile installations in Poland (the so-called anti-missile shield).

== Cooperating entities ==
Organizations which are affiliated or managed with and by the Greens.

- The "Green Area" Foundation; promotes sustainable, sustainable economic, social and ecological development. It supports financially and substantively activities in line with the ideology and program of the Greens, as well as political parties and non-governmental organizations.
- Association "Acute Green"; involved in the promotion of human rights, sustainable development, democracy, environmental protection. It is the party's youth wing and it focuses on mainly young pro-environmental activists.
- The journal "Green News"; discusses issues related to ecology, sustainable development, democracy, human rights, minority rights, presenting alternatives to the dominant socio-economic system.

== Party leaders and personalities ==
Co-Chairs: Magdalena Gałkiewicz, Michał Suchora

=== Leaders ===
==== Female co-chair ====
- 2003–2008: Magdalena Mosiewicz
- 2008–2010: Agnieszka Grzybek
- 2010–2011: Małgorzata Tkacz-Janik
- 2011–2015: Agnieszka Grzybek
- 2015–2022: Małgorzata Tracz
- 2022–2025: Urszula Zielińska
- 2025–present: Magdalena Gałkiewicz

==== Male co-chair ====
- 2003–2004: Jacek Bożek
- 2004–2011: Dariusz Szwed
- 2011–2013: Radosław Gawlik
- 2013–2016: Adam Ostolski
- 2016–2020: Marek Kossakowski
- 2020–2022: Wojciech Kubalewski
- 2022–2025: Przemysław Słowik
- 2025–present: Michał Suchora

=== Party Executive Council ===
- Wojciech Kubalewski – Leader (male)
- Małgorzata Tracz – Leader (female)
- Magdalena Gałkiewicz – General Secretary
- Mariusz Rusinek – Treasurer
- Krzysztof Rzyman – Spokesperson
- Joanna Brauła – Member
- Arkadiusz Gmurczyk – Member
- Ula Zielińska – Member

=== Former Members of the Sejm ===
- 2014–2015 Anna Grodzka

=== Councillors and members of regional parliaments ===
- Małgorzata Tkacz-Janik, member of the regional parliament of Silesia
- Ewa Koś, member of the regional parliament of West Pomerania
- Krystian Legierski, councillor in Warsaw
- Beata Kubica, councillor in Opole
- Sebastian Kotlarz, councillor in Kąty Wrocławskie
- Magdalena Gałkiewicz, councillor in Łódź
- Przemysław Słowik, councillor in Szczecin

=== Notable members ===
Other notable members of the party include: Kinga Dunin (writer, feminist, editor of Krytyka Polityczna), Radosław Gawlik (environmental activist, former deputy minister of the environment), Zbigniew Marek Hass, Tomasz Kitliński (philosopher, LGBT rights activist), Wojciech Koronkiewicz (poet, journalist, film director), Izabela Kowalczyk (art critic), Bartłomiej Kozek, Aleksandra Kretkowska, Bartosz Lech (former co-chair of the FYEG), Paweł Leszkowicz (art curator and art historian), Jerzy Masłowski, Magdalena Masny, Adam Ostolski (sociologist, member of Krytyka Polityczna), Monika Paca, Kazimiera Szczuka (writer, feminist, hosted the Polish version of The Weakest Link), Olga Tokarczuk (writer), Ludwik Tomiałojć (ornithologist), Ewa Sufin-Jacquemart (Consul of Poland in Luxembourg 2007–2011).

==== Other persons who used to be or still are affiliated with the Green party ====
- Anna Baumgart
- Jacek Bożek
- Alina Cała
- Ewa Charkiewicz
- Piotr Czerniawski
- Kinga Dunin
- Joanna Erbel
- Agnieszka Grzybek
- Tomasz Kitliński
- Jerzy Kochan
- Yga Kostrzewa
- Izabela Kowalczyk
- Krystian Legierski
- Robert Leszczyński
- Paweł Leszkowicz
- Jerzy Masłowski
- Magdalena Mosiewicz
- Witold Mrozek
- Adam Ostolski
- Monika Paca
- Dariusz Szwed
- Tomasz Szypuła
- Kazimierz Ślęczka
- Magdalena Środa
- Małgorzata Tarasiewicz
- Olga Tokarczuk
- Małgorzata Tkacz
- Marcelina Zawisza

== Election results ==
=== Sejm ===
Election	Leader	Votes	%	Seats	+/–	Government
2005	Magdalena Mosiewicz; Dariusz Szwed	459, 380	3.9 (#7)	0 / 460	New	Extra-parliamentary
2005	As part of the Social Democracy of Poland committee which did not win any seats.					
2011	Magdalena Mosiewicz; Dariusz Szwed	1,184,303	8.2 (#5)	0 / 460	0	Extra-parliamentary
2011	As part of the Democratic Left Alliance committee, that won 27 seats in total.					
2015	Małgorzata Tracz; Adam Ostolski	1,147,102	7.6 (#5)	0 / 460	0	Extra-parliamentary
2015	As part of the United Left, that did not win any seats.					
2019	Małgorzata Tracz; Marek Kossakowski	5,060,355	27.4 (#2)	3 / 460	▲3	Opposition
2019	As part of the Civic Coalition, that won 134 seats in total.					
2023	Urszula Zielińska; Przemysław Słowik	6,629,402	30.7 (#2)	3 / 460	0	PiS Minority (2023)
2023	Urszula Zielińska; Przemysław Słowik	6,629,402	30.7 (#2)	3 / 460	0	KO–PL2050–KP–NL (2023–2026)
2023	Urszula Zielińska; Przemysław Słowik	6,629,402	30.7 (#2)	3 / 460	0	KO–KP–NL–PL2050–C (2026–present)
2023	As part of the Civic Coalition, that won 157 seats in total.					

=== European Parliament ===
Election	Leader	votes	%	Seats	+/–	EP Group
2004	Magdalena Mosiewicz; Jacek Bożek	16,288	0.27 (#17)	0 / 54	New	–
2009	Agnieszka Grzybek; Dariusz Szwed	179,602	2.44 (#5)	0 / 50	0	–
2009	As part of the Alliance for the Future, that didn't win any seat.					
2014	Agnieszka Grzybek; Adam Ostolski	22,481	0.34 (#10)	0 / 51	0	–
2019	Małgorzata Tracz; Marek Kossakowski	5,249,935	38.47 (#2)	0 / 52	0	–
2019	As part of the European Coalition, that won 22 seats in total.					
2024	Urszula Zielińska; Przemysław Słowik	4,359,443	37.04 (#1)	0 / 53	0	–
2024	As part of the Civic Coalition, that won 21 seats in total.					

== See also ==
- The Greens (Poland) politicians
- LGBT rights in Poland
