= Kinga Dunin =

Polish writer (born 1954)

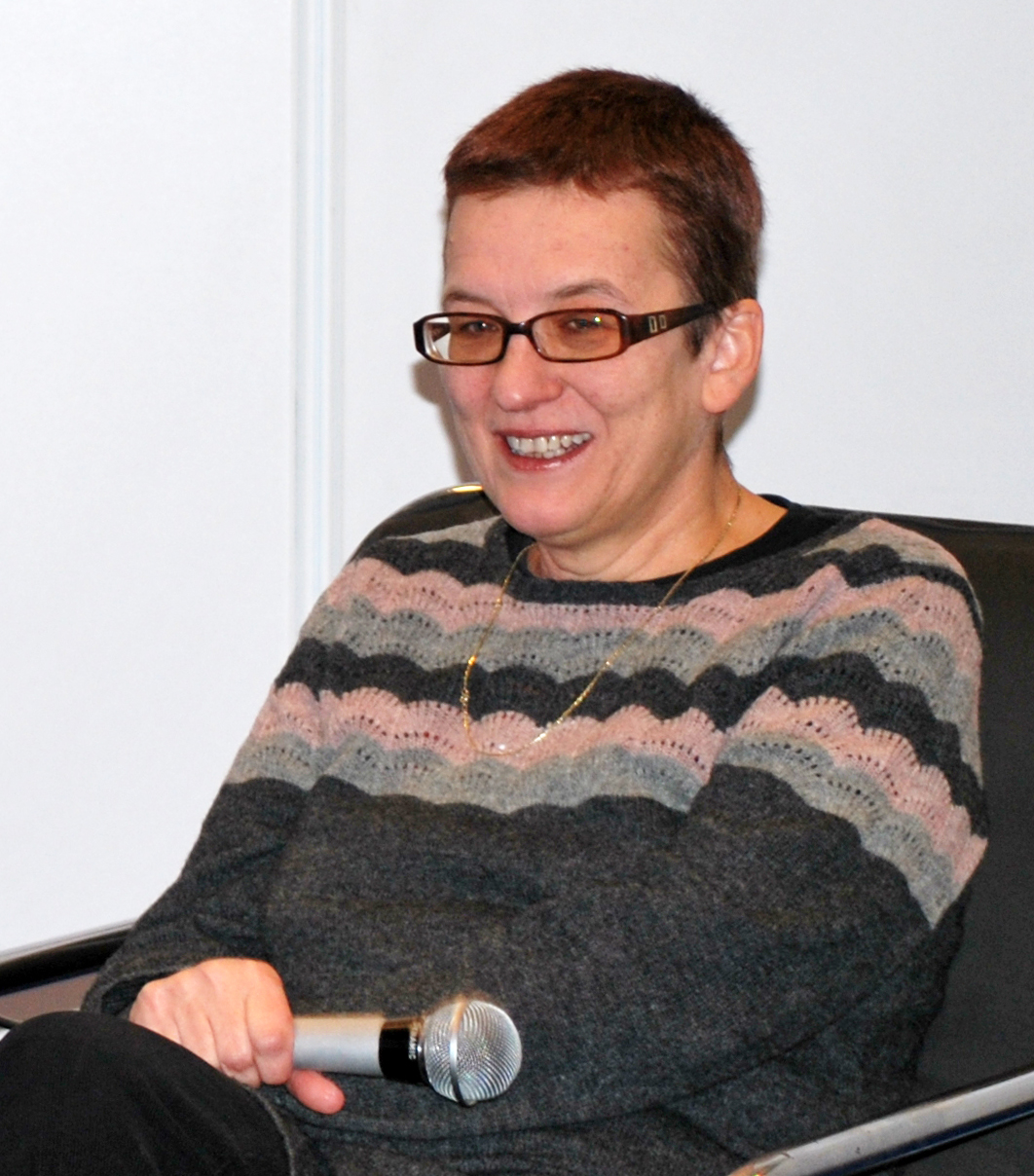
- Kinga Dunin in 2011
- Born: 25 April 1954 (age 72)
- Education: University of Łódź
- Occupations: writer, feminist, sociologist
- Political party: Greens 2004
- Parent(s): Janusz Dunin; Cecylia Dunin

Kinga Maria Dunin-Horkawicz (born 1954 in Łódź) is a Polish writer, feminist, and sociologist.

== Life ==
She is a columnist for the Wysokie Obcasy (women's extra of the Gazeta Wyborcza) and academic teacher at the Medical University of Warsaw. Before 1989 she was active in the democratic opposition (KOR and samizdat among others). Member of the New Left intellectual milieu Krytyka Polityczna and of the Polish Greens 2004.

== Books ==
Sociology

- 1991: Cudze problemy. Analiza dyskursu publicznego w Polsce (Others' Problems: an Analysis of Polish Public Discourse; coauthor)
- 2004: Czytając Polskę. Literatura polska po roku 1989 wobec dylematów nowoczesności (Reading Poland: Polish post-1989 Literature and the Dilemmas of Modernity)

Feminism

- 1996: Tao gospodyni domowej (Tao of a Housewife)
- 2000: Karoca z dyni (A Pumpkin Coach) - nomination for Nike Award 2001
- 2002: Czego chcecie ode mnie, "Wysokie Obcasy"? (What do you want from me, "Wysokie Obcasy"?)
- 2007: Zadyma (A Revolt)

Novels

- 1998: Tabu (Taboo)
- 1999: Obciach (Embarrassment)
