= Désirée H. Ladwig =

German economist

Désirée H. Ladwig (born December 18, 1964) is a German economist.

== Early life ==
Désirée Ladwig attended high school Harksheide in Norderstedt (Schleswig-Holstein). She studied Business Administration and Economics at the University of Hamburg and graduated in Business Administration (1989) and Economics (1994). From 1990 to 1995 Désirée Ladwig was scientific assistant at the Institute of Human Resources and International Management at the Helmut Schmidt University Hamburg. In 1995 she obtained her doctorate with a dissertation called "research and development cooperation in small and medium-sized enterprises - an empirical and conceptual contribution to the process management of R & D cooperation" and was subsequently postdoctoral research assistant.

== Career ==
In 2002 she was appointed as professor for life (Berlin Higher Education Act) at SRH Hochschule Berlin. There she was responsible for the business management program and the development of master's degree programs. Since 2008 she is Professor of Business Administration and Human Resource Management at the Fachhochschule Lübeck (FHL) at the Department of Mechanical Engineering and Business Administration. In 2011, she developed and implemented the Career Development Center (CDC) at the FHL.

== Interaction ==
Since 1995, Ladwig has worked as consultant in human resources, organization and management. She has accomplished a variety of consulting projects in industry and public administration on issues such as attitude survey, personnel and organizational development, strategy development, management guidelines, flexible working hours and career concepts. From 1997 to 2000 Désirée Ladwig led the international network "work life balance" of the European Commission (DGV). She is guiding the community of practise “genderdax”. Her current research focuses on knowledge transfer management, diversity management, interim management, gender studies, innovative working (time) models, retention management, career models and especially technical careers, expatriation and intercultural management.

== Books ==
- Fachlaufbahnen, (Hrsg. zus. mit Michel E. Domsch), Köln 2011.
- Exit matters, (Hrsg. zus. mit Jürgen Kunze und Michael Hartmann), Frankfurt a.M. 2011.
- Handbuch Mitarbeiterbefragungen, (Hrsg. zus. mit Michel E. Domsch), Heidelberg et al., 3. Aufl. 2013.
- Gender Equality in Eastern European Countries – Chances and Perspectives of Highly Qualified Women in the Labour Market,(hrsg. zus. mit Michel E. Domsch und Eliane Tenten), Frankfurt/M. 2003.
- Reconciliation of Family and Work in Eastern European Countries, (hrsg. zus. mit Michel E. Domsch), Frankfurt/M. et al. 2000.
- F/E-Kooperationen im Mittelstand - Grundlagen für ein erfolgreiches Prozeßmanagement, Dissertation veröffentlicht in der Schriftenreihe "technologie / management", Müller-Mehrbach, Heiner (Hrsg.), Wiesbaden 1996.
- Innovation durch Partizipation. Eine erfolgversprechende Strategie für den Mittelstand, (zus. mit Michel E. Domsch und Sven H.A. Siemers), Band 14 der Schriftenreihe „Management von Forschung, Entwicklung und Innovation", Brockhoff, K. und Domsch, M.E. (Hrsg.), Stuttgart 1995.
- Teilzeitarbeit für Führungskräfte. Eine empirische Analyse am Beispiel des hamburgischen öffentlichen Dienstes, (zus. mit Michel E. Domsch, Klemens Kleiminger und Christiane Strasse), München und Mering 1994.
