= Ladwig =

Ladwig is a surname. Notable people with the surname include:

- A. J. Ladwig (born 1992), American baseball player
- Bernd Ladwig (born 1966), German political philosopher
- Bonnie Ladwig (born 1939), American politician
- Désirée H. Ladwig (born 1964), German economist
- E. James Ladwig (born 1938), American politician
- Mark Ladwig (born 1980), American pair skater
