= Sławomir Sierakowski =

Polish journalist (born 1979)

Sławomir Witold Sierakowski
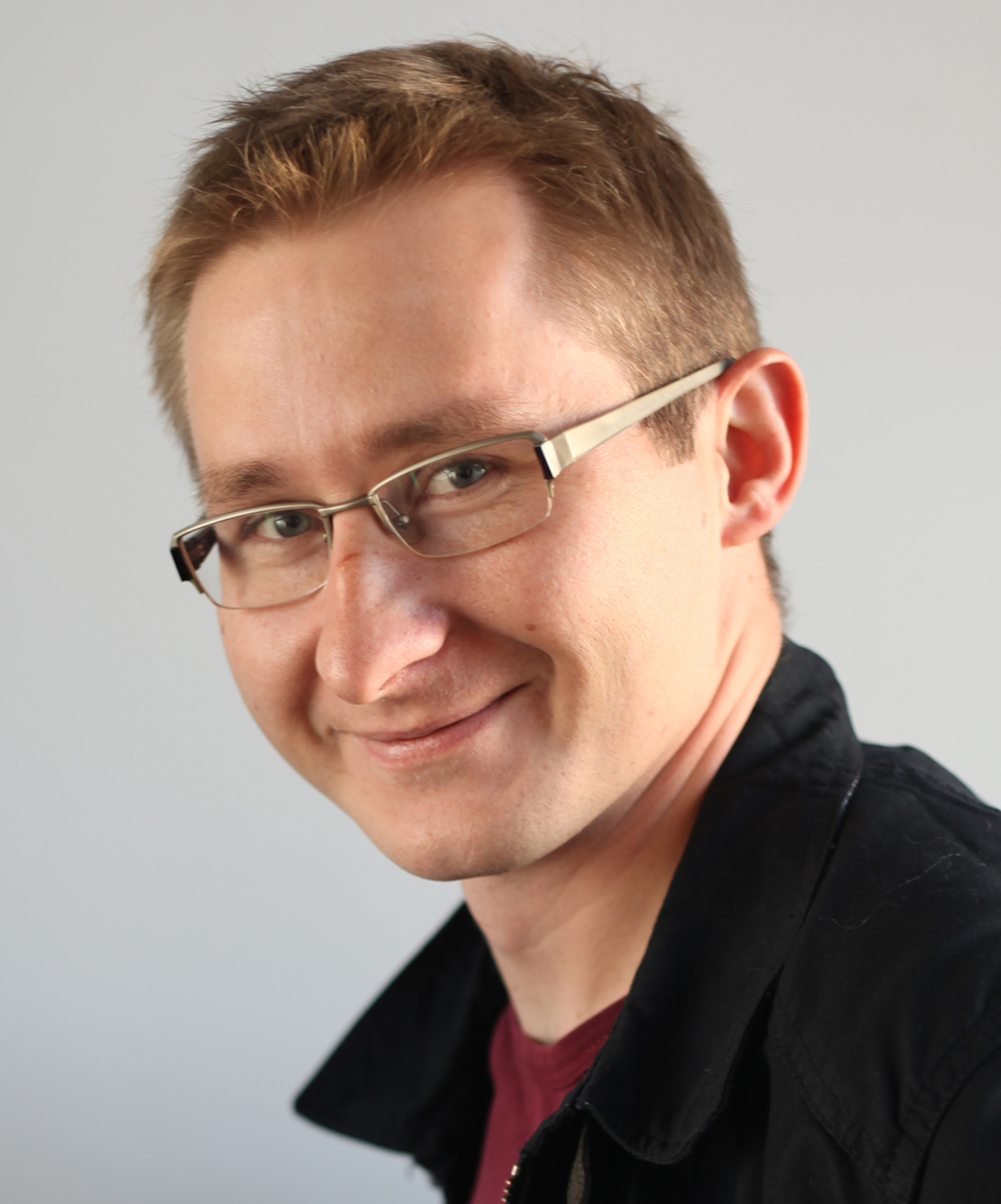
- Born: 4 November 1979 (age 47); Warsaw, Warsaw Voivodeship, Polish People's Republic
- Occupations: Economist, editor

Academic background
- Academic advisor: Ulrich Beck
- Website: Sławomir Sierakowski on Bluesky

Sławomir Witold Sierakowski (Polish pronunciation: [swaˈvɔmir ɕɛraˈkɔfskʲi]; born 4 November 1979) is a Polish journalist, literary critic and sociologist as well as head of Krytyka Polityczna (Political Critique), a movement of left-wing intellectuals, artists and activists based in Poland (with branches in Ukraine, Germany and Russia) and director of Institute for Advanced Study in Warsaw.

He studied sociology, philosophy, economics at the College of Inter-Faculty Individual Studies in the Humanities, Warsaw University, and worked under the direction of Ulrich Beck at LMU Munich. He was awarded scholarships from the Collegium Invisibile, Ministry of Education, Warsaw, the Goethe Institute and the German Foundation GFPS and DAAD, the U.S. German Marshall Fund, and Open Society Institute. He also participated in study visits to Paris at the invitation of the Government of France, and to the United States at the invitation of the American Jewish Committee and the Forum for Dialogue Among Nations, and has been visiting fellow at universities and scientific centres in Europe and the United States, including Princeton University, Yale University, Harvard University and the Institute for Human Sciences in Vienna.

He has written essays and articles on Polish and European politics and culture published in several languages. He has been cited as one of the most influential Poles within the mainstream Polish press: Polityka, Wprost, Newsweek. He has a monthly column in the international edition of the New York Times.

== Work and career ==
Since 2002, he is the founder and editor-in-chief of Krytyka Polityczna (The Political Critique) magazine and the Publishing House of the Political Critique, head of The Brave New World– the largest Polish independent cultural centre and think tank in Warsaw – a place that serves as a forum for discussion, art presentations and social and political projects (situated in the centre of Warsaw at ulica Nowy Świat 63).

In 2005, he was named president of the Stanislaw Brzozowski Association, which runs 5 cultural centers (Warsaw, Gdańsk, Łódź and Cieszyn, Kyiv) and 25 local centers in Poland, Ukraine and Russia. The Brzozowski Association also runs a publishing house, a magazine, and an internet newspaper.

In October 2003, he wrote "The Open Letter to the European Public Opinion" which confronted the position of the Polish government in support of the Constitutional Treaty for the EU and the federalist model of European integration. Signed by 250 leading intellectuals, the letter was published in Le Monde, Frankfurter Allgemeine Zeitung, Gazeta Wyborcza, Rzeczpospolita and other European newspapers. The Letter caused a large public debate which concluded in an official meeting between the Polish President, the Minister of Foreign Affairs, the Minister of European Affairs and a representation of the signatories.

In January 2014, he wrote an article in The Guardian, "Welcome Ukraine into the EU and restore faith in the project", subtitled "granting Ukraine accession wouldn't just help Ukrainians, it could end pessimism in the union and build bridges to Russia."

Sierakowski's publications include more than 400 essays and op-eds mainly devoted to Polish and European politics and culture. Among them are opinion articles, interviews (with Jürgen Habermas, Michael Walzer, Charles Taylor, Ulrich Beck, Slavoj Žižek, Ernesto Laclau, Hayden White, Chantal Mouffe, Michel Houellebecq, Michel Faber, Amos Oz, Etgar Keret, David Grossman), and book reviews. They have been published in Polish, French, Spanish, German, Czech, Slovak, Israeli, Ukrainian, Bulgarian, Romanian, dailies, weeklies and periodicals, incl. The Guardian, El País, Haaretz, die Tageszeitung, Transit, Gazeta Wyborcza.

Since 2015, he has written monthly columns for Project Syndicate, an international media organization, on European issues.

== Art cooperation ==
Sierakowski collaborated (as co-writer and actor) in a film trilogy made by Israeli-Dutch visual artist Yael Bartana. Part I: "Mary Koszmary" ("Nightmares", 2008) premiered at the Pompidou Centre in Paris and shown in the top galleries in more than 20 countries (including The Jewish Museum, The Guggenheim Museum in NY, Tate Modern in London, AGO in Toronto, UCI in LA) and debated in media (including Gazeta Wyborcza, Haaretz, The New York Times.) Part II: "Mur i Wieża" ("Wall and Tower") was produced in 2009, and the Part III ("Assassination") represented Poland in the 2011 Venice Biennale.
