= Małgorzata Tkacz-Janik =

Polish feminist activist and politician

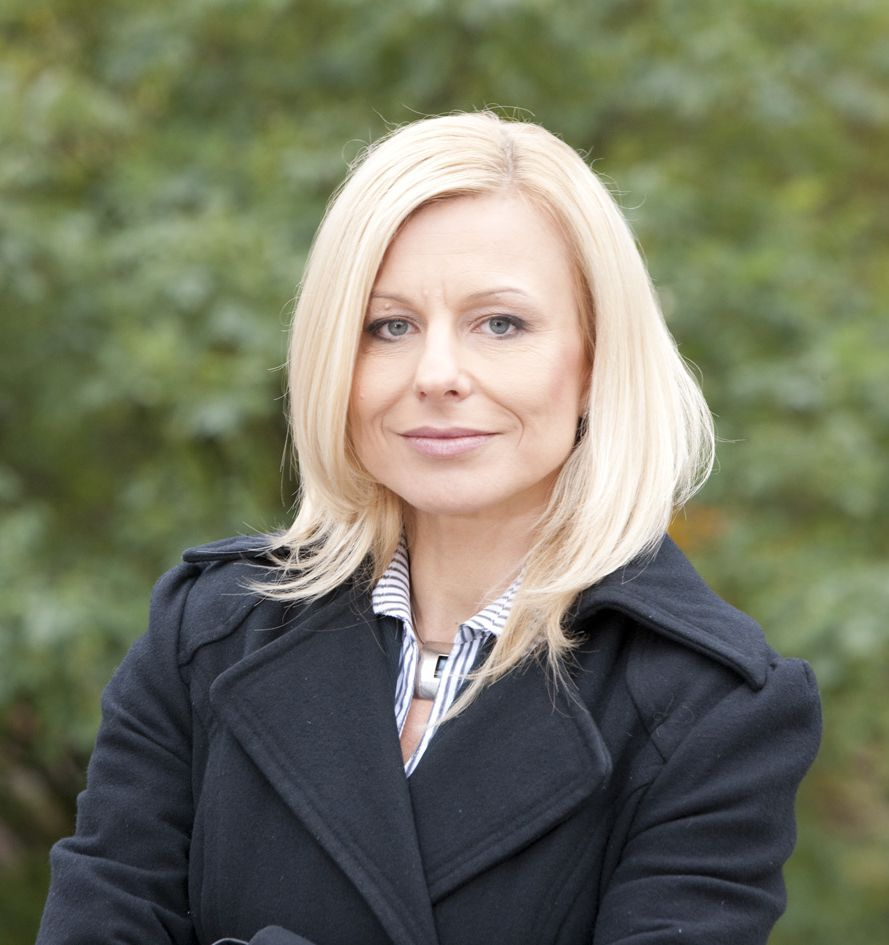
Małgorzata Tkacz-Janik

Małgorzata Tkacz-Janik (born 17 September 1965 in Zabrze) is a Polish feminist activist and politician. Together with Dariusz Szwed she led Poland's green party Greens 2004 between 2010 and 2011. Since November 2010 she has been a member of the regional parliament of Silesia.

Tkacz-Janik studied at the University of Silesia. In 2000 she received a Ph.D. in philology. Her thesis was titled Advertisement message as contemporary communication genre. She worked as academic teacher and freelance journalist.

In 2003, Tkacz-Janik was among founding members of Greens 2004 and since April 2010 has been co-leader of the party. In local elections in 2010 she won a seat in the regional parliament of Silesia. She ran on a Social Democratic ballot, following an official electoral agreement between the Greens and the Democratic Left Alliance.
