= Jaś Kapela =

Polish left-wing activist, poet, writer, columnist, and freak-fighter (born 1984)

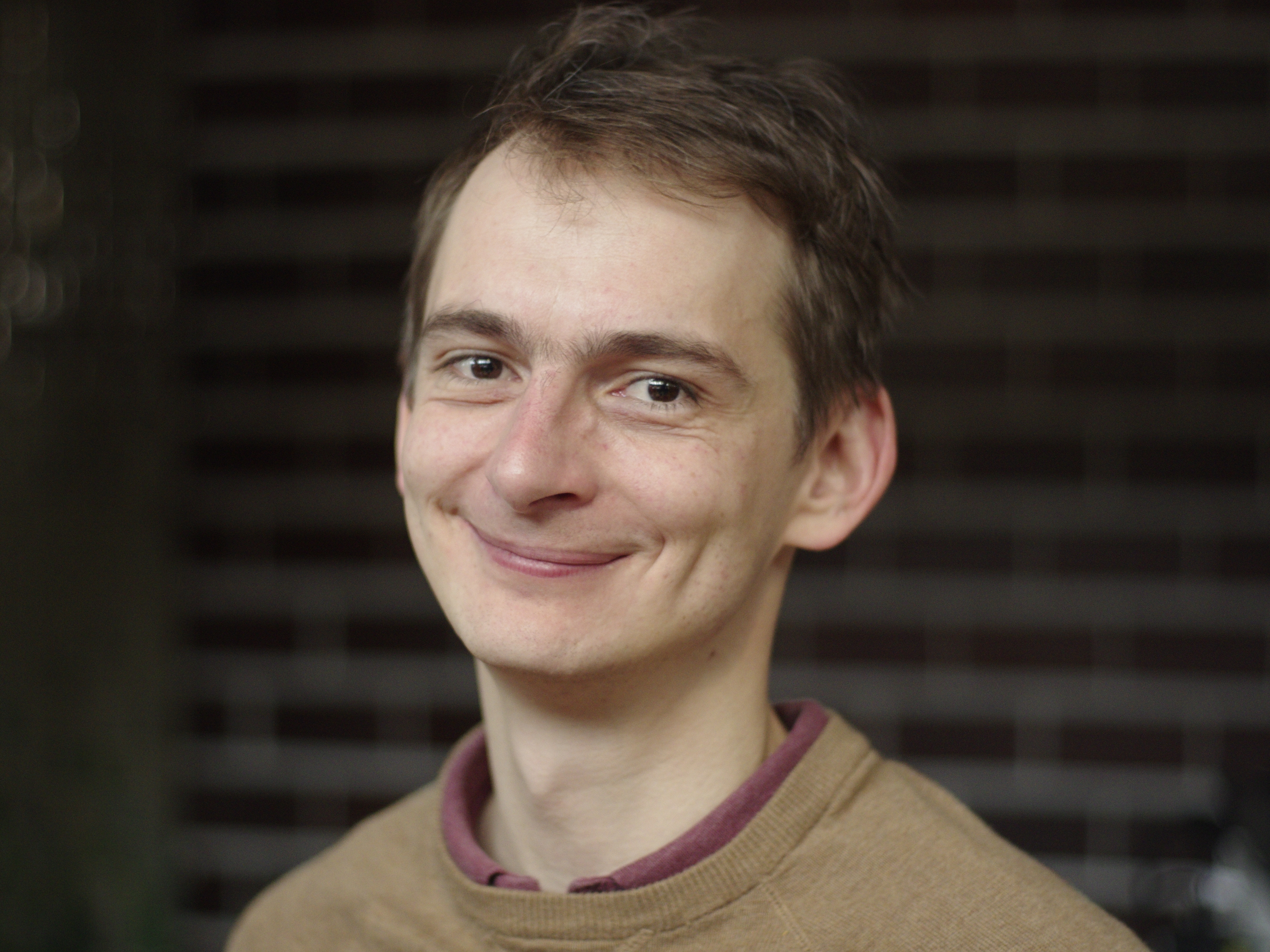
- Jaś Kapela, 2019
- Born: 22 March 1984
- Occupations: Activist, poet, writer, columnist, freak-fighter

Jaś Kapela (born 22 March 1984) is a Polish left-wing and animal rights activist, writer, poet, columnist and freak-fighter.

== Biography ==
The son of Teresa Kapela. He has four siblings. He graduated from the Bednarska High School. Later, he graduated in Polish philology from the Jagiellonian University.

On 15 March 2003 he won a poetry slam at the Stara ProchOFFnia in Warsaw.

He works in the editorial office of the Krytyka Polityczna Publishing House, in which he is the supervisor of the porpoise series. In 2015 he declared as vegan.

In 2022 he was punched in the face by Michał Gorzelańczyk “Bagieta” after having revealed that the inscription that he had tattooed on his neck, “JP2GMD”, was an abbreviation for: Jan Paweł II gwałcił małe dzieci, which in Polish means: John Paul II raped little children.

== Books ==
=== Poetry ===
- Reklama. 2005.
- Życie na gorąco. 2007.
- Modlitwy dla opornych. 2017.
- Wojownik MDMA. Staromiejski Dom Kultury. 2022.
- Wybór wierszy (PDF). Fundacja Nowoczesna Polska. 2022. ISBN 978-83-288-6702-4. Archived from the original (PDF) on 11 August 2022.

=== Novels ===
- Stosunek seksualny nie istnieje. 2008.
- Janusz Hrystus. 2010.
- Dobry troll. 2015.

=== Non-fiction ===
- Polskie mięso, czyli jak zostałem weganinem i przestałem się bać. Krytyka Polityczna. 2018.
- Warszawa wciąga. Tu byłem. Tu ćpałem. Tu piłem. Przewodnik po warszawskich klubach. 2019.
- Krótki kurs szpiegowania. Wokół literatury szpiegowskiej: przegląd technik i działań operacyjnych. 2019. Co-authored with Piotr Niemczyk

==== Collections of columns ====
- Jak odebrałem dzieci Terlikowskiemu. 2011.

=== Books for children ===
- Odwaga. 2021. Co-authored with Hanna M. Zagulska.
