= Małgorzata Tarasiewicz =

Polish political scientist

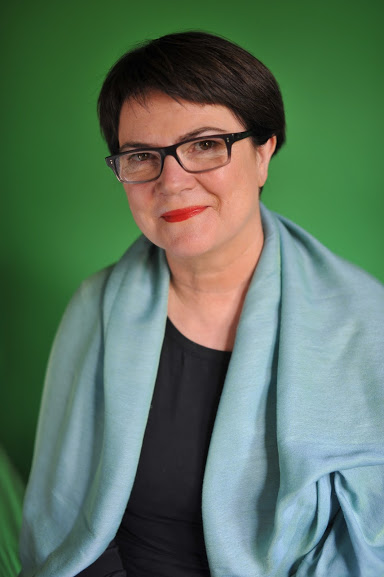
- Awards: Cross of Freedom and Solidarity; Order of Polonia Restituta
- Scientific career
- Fields: Political science

Małgorzata Tarasiewicz (born 11 August 1960) is a Polish activist, politician, and political scientist. She was a coordinator of the Polish section of Amnesty International, where she was involved with efforts to establish the International Criminal Court. Tarasiewicz has been involved in the leadership of the Polish Green Party, and has run for public office as an independent.

== Career ==
During the late 1980s, Tarasiewicz was an activist with the Freedom and Peace Movement (pl), and worked as a labour activist. She pursued university studies in Gdańsk, graduating in 1987 with a degree in political science and English. From 1989 to 1991, she was the president of the women's section of the Polish trade union Solidarity. From 1991 to 1995, she was coordinator of the Polish branch of Amnesty International. She then became the head of the Network of East-West Women (pl), an organization which seeks to foster coordination on feminist issues between the post-Soviet countries of Eastern and Central Europe and activists in Western Europe and the United States. From 1997 to 1999, she was involved in efforts by Amnesty International to help establish the International Criminal Court. From 2003 to 2005, Tarasiewicz was a member of the national council of the Polish Green Party.

In the local government elections in 2014, Tarasiewicz was an independent candidate to be the mayor of Sopot, placing 4th. In the 2018 elections, she ran again with the Free and Solidary party, again placing 4th.

Tarasiewicz was featured in the 2011 play Sprawa operacyjnego rozpoznania. In 2013, she was awarded the Cross of Freedom and Solidarity. In 2020, she received the Commander's Cross of the Order of Polonia Restituta.

== Selected awards ==
- Cross of Freedom and Solidarity, Government of Poland (2013)
- Commander's Cross of the Order of Polonia Restituta, Government of Poland (2020)
