= Dariusz Szwed =

Polish politician

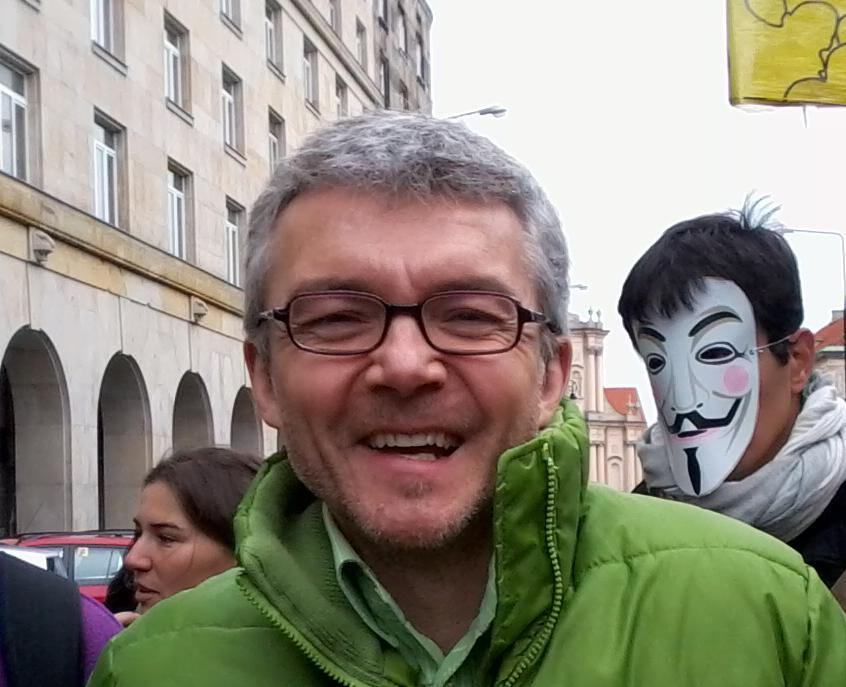
Dariusz Szwed

Dariusz Szwed (born 25 April 1967) is a Polish politician, feminist, activist and expert on green economy and sustainable development. He is one of the trustees of the Green Institute Foundation and the chair of its Programme Council.

Previously chairman (together with Małgorzata Tkacz-Janik, chairwoman) of Poland's Greens 2004 party (Zieloni 2004). Delegate of Zieloni 2004 to the European Green Party. Co-ordinator of campaigns "Green economy" and "Green energy". He was a candidate in 2011 parliamentary elections as the leader of the list of SLD in Chrzanów.

== Early life and education ==
Szwed was born on 25 April 1967 in Kraków. Szwed is a graduate of Kraków University of Economics (International economic relations) and University of Warsaw (Economic foundations of environmental policy).

== Public activities ==
Szwed co-operates with the European Greens–European Free Alliance and is a delegate to the European Green Party. He is also a member of the European Association of Environmental and Resource Economists.

Consultant on the issue of sustainable development in several organizations, including the International Bank for Reconstruction and Development, Greenpeace International, Milieukontakt Oost-Europa, Northern Alliance for Environment and Development, Regional Environmental Center, World Wide Fund for Nature (WWF), and IUCN.

In the first half of the 1990s Szwed was an active member in the Green Federation (environmental NGO). He participated in organizing protests against nuclear tests on the Mururoa atoll. Between 1996 and 1997 he coordinated the European campaign “Menu for the Next Millennium”, which aimed at promoting the sustainable development of rural areas, fair trade and ecological agriculture. This action resulted in introducing into the Polish law the first in the history regulations concerning consumer protection and environmental protection against genetically modified organism.

Throughout his term of office 1997–2004, Szwed acted as a European Parliament adviser on the acceding countries. In 2000–2002 Szwed was an external expert of the Polish Ministry of Environment on access to information and public participation in decision-making and Aarhus Convention.

Until 2007 together with Cezary Łasiczka he had been giving broadcast entitled “Political Ecology” on the Polish radio station TOK FM.

== Political activities and views ==
Dariusz Szwed took an active part in saving the Rospuda Valley, a part of Augustów Primeval Forest. In his open letter to Prime Minister Jarosław Kaczyński he put forward arguments for building Via Baltica route with bypassing the wetlands of Rospuda Valley. In the open letter to Donald Tusk he presented ten demands addressed at the coalition of Civic Platform and Polish Peasant Party, i.e., he supported Maciej Nowicki who was appointed Minister of the Environment a few days later.

As a result of a political inter-party agreement, he was a candidate in 2005 national elections on 1. position of Social Democracy of Poland list in Olsztyn. Social Democracy of Poland list received 459380 votes (3.89%) which was below 5% election threshold.

In February 2009 Szwed contributed to launching “Agreement for the Future”, a movement that is led by Dariusz Rosati, civic groups and local authority representatives.

In 2009 European elections he stood as a candidate of the coalition “Agreement for the Future” in the Pomeranian Voivodeship. He received 1758 votes (39.37% of a votes for the list), however, the coalition won only 2.44% in Poland and was below election threshold. According to Newsweek Polska ranking Szwed was one of the 39 best candidates for the European Parliament. He was the only candidate in the Pomerian district who received support from Women's Party (Poland). Furthermore, Szwed was among four other Polish candidates who completed WWF questionnaire.

Szwed is a proponent of protecting consumers from monopolies, enhancing power efficiency and developing renewable energy which he calls energy democracy. He disapproves of nuclear power – together with Krzysztof Żmijewski he designed a project to replace 20 million bulbs with energy-saving ones which would provide the same power (Negawatt power), yet at a price 100 times lower than the cost of one block of a nuclear power station. Szwed is a staunch supporter of egalitarianism, particularly of the politics of equal opportunities for men and women, as well as of protecting the rights of minority groups. Additionally, he is an active member of anti-war and alterglobalist movements. He advocates knowledge society, green technology, free culture movement and free software. Szwed is a proponent of the separation of Church and State and the ideological impartiality of State. He has elaborately presented his views on the vision of European Union, its economic, environmental, energy and international policy, as well as on matters of outlook and ethics

== Publications ==
Szwed is an author, co-author and editor of books and publications on sustainable development, green politics, i.a.:

- "Green New Deal in Poland", Green institute, Green European Foundation, 2010; editor and author of an article on sustainable transport policy
- "Greens: we will stop nuclear", "Parliament - for female economist or male nurse?", "Poland can become Europe's green tiger", in: "Green News" ("Zielone wiadomości")
- "Green New Deal in Poland", in: "Goals and principles of development", publication for the Fifth Civic Congress in Warsaw
- Polski odcień zieleni. Zielone idee i siły polityczne w Polsce, Heinrich Böll Foundation, Warsaw, December 2008, ISBN 978-83-61340-00-3
- Green Identity in a Changing Europe Heinrich Böll Foundation EU Regional Office Brussels, November 2008
- Agriculture at a Crossroads. Volume IV: North America and Europe. International Assessment of Agricultural Knowledge, Science, and Technology, Island Press, Washington, D.C. 2008, ISBN 978-1-59726-548-5
- Zielone Miasto Nowej Generacji [English: The Green City of the New Generation]. Brussels: European Green Party. 2007. ISBN 978-83-87605-91-9. Archived from the original on 2014-11-07.
- Nuclear Power – Myth and Reality (editor of Polish edition), Heinrich Böll Foundation, Warsaw, December 2006, ISBN 83-85787-45-3
- Food safety in European Union's agricultural and consumer policies in the New Member States, IUCN – Office for Central Europe, Warsaw 2005
- Jak ubiegać się o udostępnienie informacji o środowisku? : przewodnik dla organizacji pozarządowych, Polska Zielona Sieć, Warszawa 2002, ISBN 83-915390-1-6
- Udział społeczeństwa w postępowaniu w sprawie oceny oddziaływania na środowisko, Ministry of Environment, Warsaw 2002, ISBN 83-85787-35-6
- Dostęp do informacji o środowisku, Ministry of Environment, Warsaw 2002, ISBN 83-85787-34-8
- Zalecane kierunki zmian wzorców konsumpcji i modeli produkcji sprzyjające strategii trwałego, zrównoważonego rozwoju, Ministry of Economy, Warsaw 2000
- Analiza kosztów i korzyści ratyfikacji Konwencji o dostępie do informacji, udziale społeczeństwa w podejmowaniu decyzji oraz dostępie do sprawiedliwości w sprawach dotyczących środowiska, Ministry of Environment, Warsaw 1999 (document not published)
- Model współpracy pomiędzy Ministerstwem Ochrony Środowiska, Zasobów Naturalnych i Leśnictwa a pozarządowymi organizacjami ekologicznymi (co-author), Towarzystwo Naukowe Prawa Ochrony Środowiska, Wrocław, 1997
- Trade Liberalization – an Environmental Problem – paper presented at the public symposium: Trade, Environment and Sustainable Development, GATT, Geneva, June 10–11, 1994
