= Ewa Charkiewicz =

Ewa Charkiewicz (born September 22, 1951) is a Polish economist, socialist feminist, and member of the Green Party. She conducts transdisciplinary research and lectured at universities in the Netherlands, the United States and India. She combines academic work with involvement in social movements.

== Biography ==
=== Career ===
In the 1980s she was a journalist in the magazine Na Przełaj and one of the founders of the Movement 'I prefer to be'. In the 1990s, she was a member and coordinator of the Gender Advisor Group at the World Bank, where she coordinated the research program on ecology and sustainability in DAWN, a feminist network of researchers and activists from the South. She co-founded the Feminist Institute in Bangalore. She belongs to the Karat Coalition.

In 2005, she founded the Tomek Byra Foundation, Ecology and Art in Poland, initiated the Feminist Think Tank, and co-organized the seminar "Left from Foucault: Transformation and Power" (2006–2009). In 2010, she initiated the creation of the Left Feminist Network Starfish. She writes transformation analysis published on the Foundation's website, Tomek Byry Ecology and Art.

She is the author and editor of books on feminist critique of economics, ecology and relationships between gender and economic development, including Women, Environment and Sustainable Development. Towards Theoretical Synthesis (London 1994), Transitions to Sustainable Consumption and Production. Theories, Concepts, Actions (Maastricht 2000), Globalization and Changes in Consumption and Production Patterns in Central and Eastern Europe (Ljubljana 1998).

Charkiewicz practices feminism as a social criticism aimed at undermining all power relations, not only those related to gender. She criticizes liberal feminism for essentialism and blurring the economic differences between women.
