= Andrzej Osęka =

Polish art historian (1932–2021)

Andrzej Konrad Osęka (3 December 1932 – 1 May 2021) was a Polish art historian, journalist and art critic, and recipient of the Order of Polonia Restituta.

== Biography ==
In 1955, Osęka graduated in art history at the University of Warsaw. During the Polish People's Republic, he worked as a journalist and wrote about contemporary art. He was an associate of "Po Prostu" (1955-1956), and then a member of the editorial staff of "Przegląd Kulturalny" (1955-1962) and "Kultura" (1965-1981).

Osęka was a member of the Association of Polish Journalists and the Polish Writers' Union, and a collaborator of the Experience and Future Conversatory (for example, he prepared the chapter on Social Behavior for the report Poland towards martial law in 1982).

From 1980 Osęka was a member of NSZZ "Solidarność", and was active in the Team for Culture of the Mazovia Region of the union. Osęka was a member of the Independent Culture Committee (1983–1989), where he was responsible for visual arts. In 1983 Osęka was a founder of the monthly Kultura Niezna. He collaborated with Kultura under the pseudonym Paweł Morga and with the underground press in Poland (including Tygodnik Mazowsze). He received the Publicist Award of Juliusz Mieroszewski (1986).

After 1989, Osęka continued to write on cultural topics. In 1992 he joined the editorial office of Gazeta Wyborcza. He has also published in Dziennik Polska-Europa-Świat, Wprost and Polityka. He was a member of the program council of the Open Republic association.

In 2011, President Bronisław Komorowski decorated Osęka with the Knight's Cross of the Order of Polonia Restituta. He was the father of Piotr Osęka and the brother of Janusz Osęka.

Osęka died on May 1, 2021, at the age of 89.
