= Artur Żmijewski (filmmaker) =

Polish visual artist, filmmaker and photographer

Artur Żmijewski (born 26 May 1966 in Warsaw) is a Polish visual artist, filmmaker and photographer. During the years of 1990–1995 he studied at Warsaw Academy of Fine Arts. He is an author of short video movies and photography exhibitions, which were shown all over the world. Since 2006 he is artistic editor of the "Krytyka Polityczna".

His solo show If It Happened Only Once It's As If It Never Happened was at "Kunsthalle Basel" in 2005, the same year in which he represented Poland at the 51st Venice Biennale. He has shown in Documenta 12 (2007), and Manifesta 4 (2002); Wattis Institute for Contemporary Art, San Francisco (2012, 2005); National Gallery of Art Zacheta, Warsaw (2005); Kunstwerke, Berlin (2004); CAC, Vilnius (2004); "Moderna Museet", Stockholm (1999). Earlier this year he presented Democracies at "Foksal Gallery Foundation", Warsaw; and is making new work for The Museum of Modern Art (Moma) in New York as part of their Projects’ Series in September 2009. "Cornerhouse", Manchester, presented the first major UK survey of Zmijewski's work, spanning his practice from 2003 to the present day, from November 2009 – January 2010. He was the curator of the 7th Berlin Biennale in 2012 – of which he opened the curatorial process as a collaboration.

Berek (The Game of Tag), 1999 has repeatedly brought controversy. The piece depicts nude adults playing tag in the gas chamber of the Stutthof concentration camp.

== Notable works ==
=== Movies ===
Note: Titles in brackets are non-official English titles.

- Ja i AIDS (Me and AIDS), 1996
- Ogród botaniczny ZOO (ZOO, The Botanic Garden), 1997
- Oko za Oko (An Eye for an Eye), 1998
- Berek (The Game of Tag), 1999
- KR WP, 2000
- Sztuka kochania (An Art of Love), 2000
- Karolina (Caroline), 2001
- Na spacer (Out for a Walk), 2001
- Lekcja śpiewu 1 (Singing Lesson 1), 2001
- Lekcja śpiewu 2 (Singing Lesson 2), 2003
- Pielgrzymka (Pilgrimage), 2003
- Nasz śpiewnik (Our Songbook), 2003
- Itzik, 2003
- Lisa, 2003
- 80064, 2004
- Rendez-vous, 2004
- Powtórzenie (Repetition), 2005
- Wybory.pl, 2005
- Them, 2007
- Democracies, 2009
- Blindly, 2013 (Biennale di Venezia)
- Realism, 2017
- Compassion, 2022

=== Photographies ===
- 40 Szuflad (40 Drawers), 1995
- Gestures, 2019
- Refugees/Cardboards, 2022

=== Solo exhibitions ===
- Tożsamość Dzidzi, 1995, Galeria Przyjaciół A.R., Warsaw, Poland
- Śpiew sardynek, 1996, Galeria a.r.t., Płock, Poland
- Oko za oko, 1998, Centrum Sztuki Współczesnej Zamek Ujazdowski, Warsaw, Poland
- Ausgewahlte Arbeiten, 1999, Galeria Wyspa, Gdańsk, Poland
- Berek, 2000, Galeria a.r.t., Płock, Poland
- Na Spacer, 2001, Galeria Foksal, Warsaw, Poland
- Lekcja śpiewu 1 / Lekcja śpiewu 2, 2003, Fundacja Galerii Foksal, Warsaw, Poland
- Singing lesson 2, 2003, Galerie für Zeitgenössische Kunst Leipzig, Leipzig, Germany
- Singing lesson, 2003, Wilkinson Gallery, London, Great Britain
- Artur Żmijewski. Selected Works 1998–2003, 2004, MIT List Visual Arts Center, Boston, US
- Artur Żmijewski, 2004, Centre d'art Contemporain de Bretigny, Brétigny-sur-Orge, France
- Powtórzenie, 2005, Polski Pawilon na LI Międzynarodowym Biennale w Wenecji, Venice, Italy
- Artur Żmijewski, 2005, Kunsthalle, Basel, Switzerland
- Artur Żmijewski, 2009, Cornerhouse, Manchester, United Kingdom
- Artur Żmijewski, 2010, Trade (gallery), Nottingham, United Kingdom
- Artur Żmijewski - When Fear Eats the Soul, 2022, PAC - Padiglione d'Arte Contemporanea, Milan, Italy

=== Group exhibitions ===
- Documenta 2007, Kassel, Germany
- Double Agent 2008, Institute of Contemporary Arts, London, BALTIC, Gateshead, Warwick Arts Centre, Warwick
- 11th International Istanbul Biennial 2009, Istanbul
