= Małgorzata Tracz =

Polish politician (born 1985)

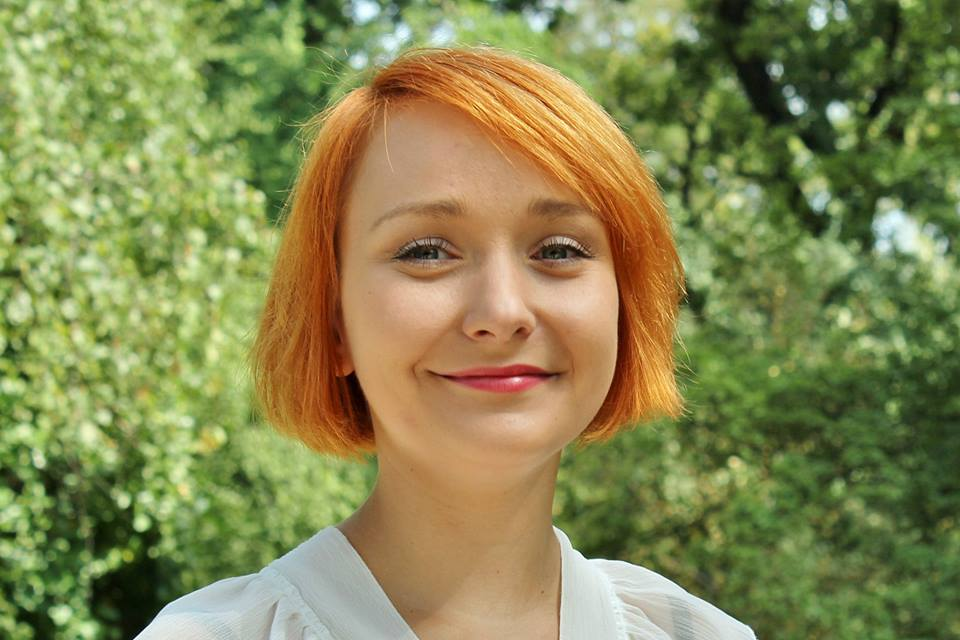

Member of the Sejm
- Incumbent
- Assumed office 12 November 2019
- Parliamentary group: Civic Coalition
- Constituency: No. 3 (Wrocław)

Co-chair of The Greens
- In office May 2015 – January 2022

Personal details
- Born: Małgorzata Elżbieta Tracz; 8 December 1985 (age 40) Bolesławiec, Poland
- Party: Independent (since 2025)
- Other political affiliations: The Greens (2014-2025); Civic Coalition (since 2019)
- Education: University of Wrocław
- Website: malgorzatatracz.pl

Małgorzata Elżbieta Tracz (born 8 December 1985) is a Polish politician, member of the Sejm since 2019.

Tracz was born on 8 December 1985 in Bolesławiec. She studied at the University of Wrocław and graduated with a master's degree in Polish studies and balchelor's degree in international relations.

She was a member of The Greens party until 2025, having served as a party's co-chairperson between May 2015 and January 2022.

Tracz was first elected member of the Sejm in 2019 election as a Civic Coalition candidate. She has been reelected in 2023 and is representing Sejm Constituency no. 3 a second term.
