= Tomasz Kitliński =

Polish political philosopher (born 1965)

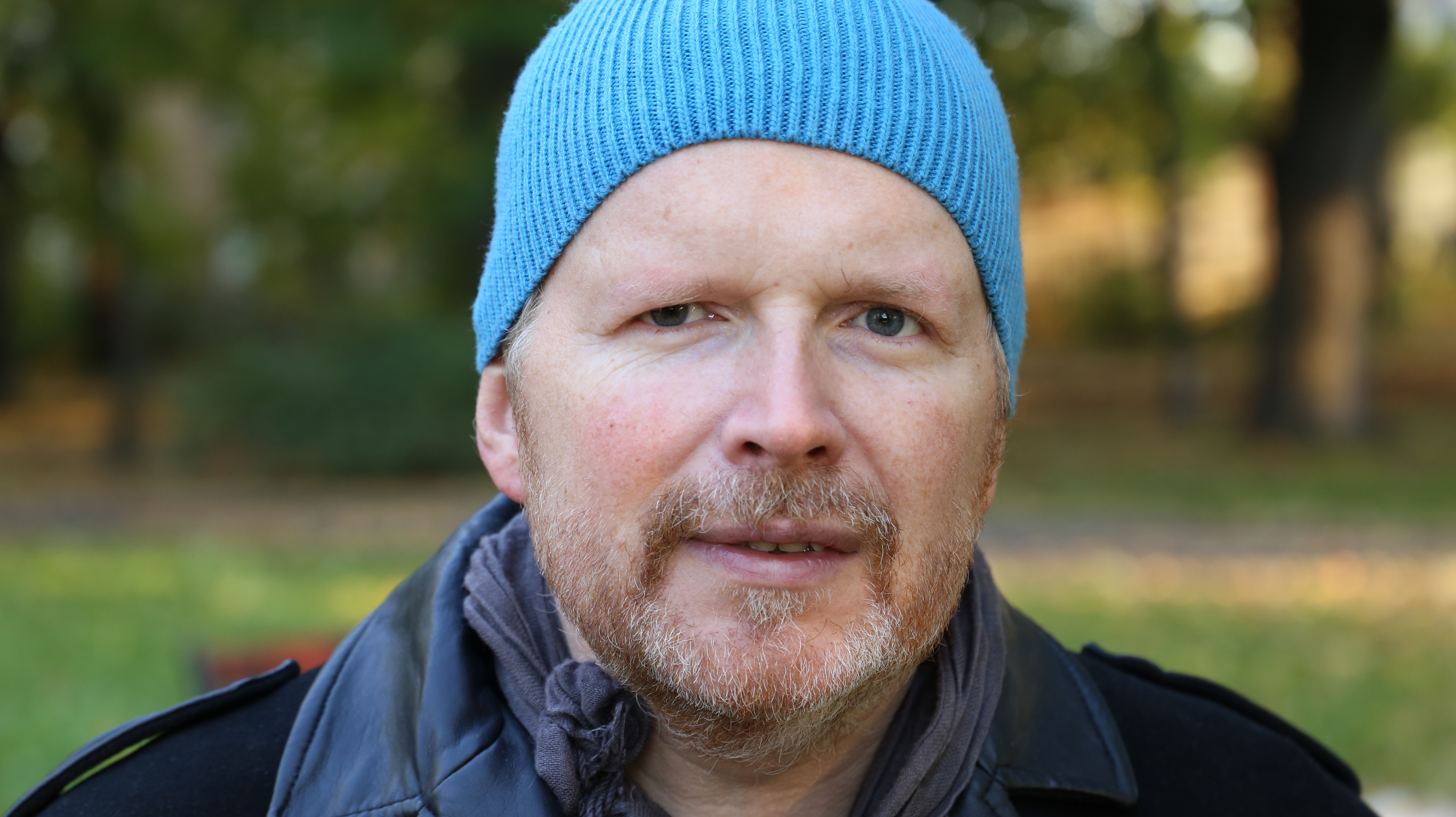
Tomasz Kitliński in Lublin, 2017

Tomasz Kitliński (born 29 December 1965) is a Polish political philosopher, cultural and social analyst, and civic activist. He was a lecturer and trade unionist at Maria Curie-Sklodowska University: since 2023 he has been Professor at the Academy of the Arts in Szczecin. He is also an author of books (Dream? Democracy!), articles, petitions and letters of protest. In his research and teaching, he deals with contemporary society, culture and politics, intellectual history, literary and critical theory, art practice, religious studies and social anthropology. In his activism, he champions women's, LGBT, labour and refugee rights and participation.

== Biography ==
Tomasz Kitlinski holds his M.Phil. from the Paris Diderot University, where he prepared his thesis, supervised by Julia Kristeva. He conducted research under Hélène Cixous, Maria Janion and Julia Kristeva.

He was a Fulbright scholar at the New School for Social Research in New York, where he participated in the seminars of Ágnes Heller, Richard J. Bernstein and Jonathan Schell. He also conducted research and presented a paper at the Courtauld Institute of Art, London. Recipient of Maria Skłodowska-Curie Intra-European Fellowship. He was a Fellow at Margherita von Brentano-Zentrum für Geschlechterforschung at the Freie Universität in Berlin, 2021- 2023. In 2023 he served as Senior Fellow in Image Science (Bildwissenschaft) at the Department of Art History, Technische Universität Dresden, where he conducted a project "A Comparative Study of the Politics of Women's, Queer and Refugees' Protest Art, and Visual Culture in Poland, 2015-present."

Kitlinski is a member of Poland's Green Party. At the University of Brighton, he moderated a meeting with Britain's only Green MP, Caroline Lucas. In a letter to the editor, published in the Guardian, he has written on the importance of Zygmunt Bauman's scholarly output. In 2011 he curated Transeuropa Festival in Lublin, where he organised a series of queer, feminist and Jewish events, to which he invited Irena Grudzinska-Gross, Robert Biedroń, Kazimiera Szczuka, Anna Grodzka and Robert Kuwałek.

Kitlinski was cited by the New York Times.

He has been involved in filmmaking; Kitlinski collaborated with directors Helen Whitney, Raphael Lewandowski, Urszula Pieregonczuk, Grzegorz Linkowski and Piotr Brozek.

On 2019 Polish parliamentary election Kitliński was a candidate for the sejm from The Left. He received 2334 votes.

== Books ==
- Dream? Democracy! A Philosophy of Horror, Hope & Hospitality in Art & Action, Lublin: Maria Curie-Sklodowska Press, 2014 (table of contents:) ISBN 978-83-7784-499-1
- Love and Democracy: Reflections on the Queer Question in Poland (with Paweł Leszkowicz), Cracow: Aureus, 2005. ISBN 83-87887-56-0
- The Stranger Is within Ourselves: How to Love according to Julia Kristeva, Cracow: Aureus, 2001. ISBN 83-87887-26-9
- Love. Hate (with Dariusz Fodczuk and Chris Hurford), Lublin: Ex-Libris, 1991. ISBN 83-900221-0-9
- Parallel Lines (with Angus Reid), Wroclaw: Galeria x, 1990.

== Bibliography ==
- Kitlinski's contribution, co-authored with Joe Lockard and Pawel Leszkowicz, to the NYU Press collection of essays: Laurent Berlant, Lisa Duggen (eds), Our Monica, Ourselves. New York: New York University Press, 2001
- Sociologist Eric Fassin on Kitlinski's article, co-authored with Joe Lockard and Pawel Leszkowicz, about Monica Lewinsky:
- Kitlinski's contribution to the Palgrave Macmillan collection of essays: Angela Jones (ed), A Critical Inquiry into Queer Utopias. New York: Palgrave Macmillan, 2013 ISBN 9781137311979
- Kitlinski's biography at the Courtauld Institute of Art, University of London:
- Kitlinski's biography in the scholarly journal Inter Alia:
- Kitlinski's biography at Gender Center, Polish Academy of Sciences:
- Sociologist Dota Szymborska-Dyrda reviews Tomasz Kitlinski and Pawel Leszkowicz's book Love and Democracy: Reflections on the Queer Question in Poland:
