= Krystian Legierski =

Polish LGBT activist (born 1978)

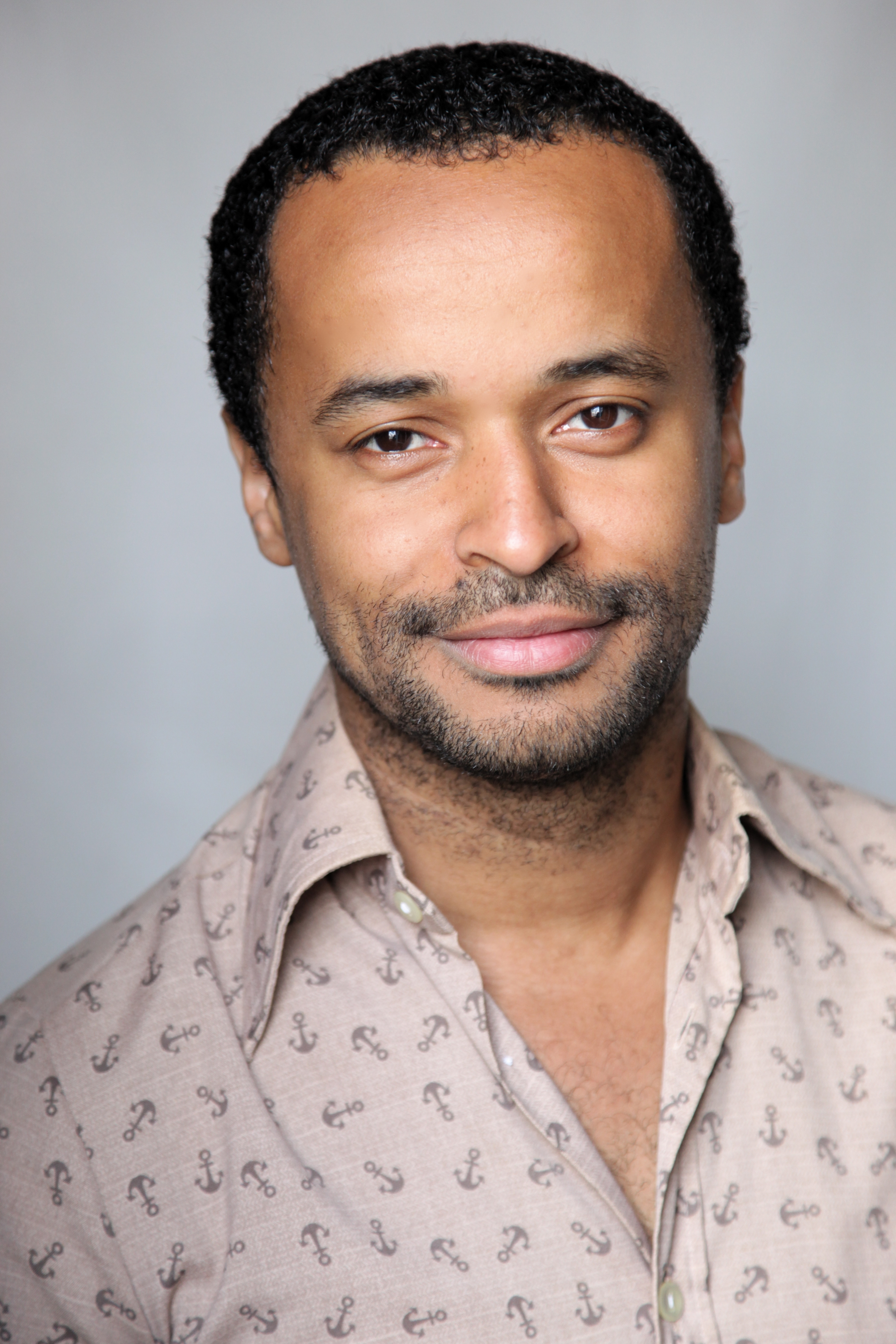
Krystian Legierski

Krystian Legierski (born 22 April 1978 in Koniaków) is a Polish LGBT activist, entrepreneur, member of the Greens. In local elections in 2010 he won a seat in the Warsaw City Council, thus becoming the first openly gay politician elected to a political office in Poland.

== Biography ==
He was born in Poland, to a Polish mother and a Mauritanian father who was in Poland as an international student.

Legierski studied law at the University of Warsaw. He has been active in LGBT movement. In 2003 he co-authored first draft of a law on civil unions sponsored in the Polish Senate by Maria Szyszkowska; the law was passed by the Senate, but was not considered by the Sejm. Since 2009 he has been involved in another effort to introduce civil unions into Polish legal system. Between 2006 and 2010 he co-hosted Lepiej późno niż wcale (Better Late Than Never) - an LGBT radio programme on TOK FM.

In 2003 he founded his first club called Le Madame in the Warsaw Old Town. Le Madame was a nightclub, but also a cultural center, providing space for alternative theatre, music, drag queen shows, art exhibitions and political debate. It was closed by the acting mayor of Warsaw, Mirosław Kochalski, in March 2006, shortly after Lech Kaczyński, Kochalski's predecessor who had a history of banning Gay Pride events in Warsaw, became President of Poland. The closure was met with protests, which came to be labelled as "the Polish Stonewall". Along with Le Madame Legierski founded a gay club Tomba Tomba (later renamed Usta Mariana) as well as M25 - a nightclub and a theatre scene.

Legierski was among founding members of the Polish Green party Greens 2004. In November 2010 he won a seat in Warsaw City Council. He ran on a Social Democratic ballot, following an official electoral agreement between the Greens and the Democratic Left Alliance.

== See also ==
- LGBT rights in Poland
