= Retention management =

The workforce Planning for Wisconsin State Government (2005) defines retention management as “a systematic effort by employers to create and foster an environment that encourages current employees to remain at the same employer having policies and practices in place that address their diverse needs”.

== Objectives and principles ==
Retention management focuses on measures that lead to retention of employees. It includes activities that systematically influence the binding, performance and degree of loyalty of staff. David J. Forrest (1999) defines 5 basic principles of retention management that lead to employee performance and satisfaction, and therefore to their retention.

1. employees need to feel they are appreciated, valued and trusted. It is about respecting people and their contributions to the company effort.
2. development. Employees who participate in their own growth and development plans are going to stay with the company because they know their company wants more for them.
3. growth in responsibility. Most people want to grow and to feel more competent and more responsible, at any level. A good company helps people manage themselves by consistently focusing on performance and results. The manager teaches the employee what they are good at, what else they need to know and how to get it. As they grow they receive higher levels of responsibility and accountability. This attitude also encourages innovation and creativity.
4. good relationship with the manager. The supervisor represents the personal experience of a corporation of employees and therefore reflects, for better or for worse, its underlying attitudes toward them.
5. success. The valued and successful employee stays. This implies, of course, that the work is meaningful to the corporate enterprise. The strong employer rewards employees for helping to make others successful as well.
