= Paweł Leszkowicz =

Polish art historian and art curator (born 1970)

Paweł Leszkowicz (born 17 December 1970) is a Polish art historian and art curator. He works as a lecturer and researcher at the Department of History of Art, Adam Mickiewicz University in Poznań, and lectures at the University of Fine Arts in Poznań. He is a member of International Association of Art Critics.

== Biography ==
Leszkowicz studied art history, gender studies and journalism at Adam Mickiewicz University in Poznań, Courtauld Institute of Art in London; and he was a Fulbright scholar at New School University in New York. In 2000, he defended his doctoral dissertation on Helen Chadwick at the Adam Mickiewicz University in Poznań.

Leszkowicz is an LGBT rights activist. Together with his partner Tomasz Kitliński he took part in Poland's lesbian and gay visibility campaigns Let Them See Us and Equal in Europe. He is a member of Poland's Green Party.

== Exhibitions ==
- GK Collection, the first exhibition of the private art collection of Grażyna Kulczyk (the main private collector of contemporary art in Poland)
- Love and Democracy, Poznań and Gdańsk, 2006
- Ars Homo Erotica at the National Museum in Warsaw, 2010
- Civil Partnerships: Feminist & Queer Art & Activism at the University of Brighton, 2012 (with Lara Perry and Tomasz Kitliński)

== Books ==
- Helen Chadwick. Ikonografia podmiotowości [Helen Chadwick: The Iconography of Subjectivity] (2001)
- Miłość i demokracja. Rozważania o kwestii homoseksualnej w Polsce [Love and Democracy: Reflections on the Queer Question in Poland] (2005, with Tomasz Kitliński)
- Art pride. Polska sztuka gejowska [Art Pride: Gay Art from Poland] (2010)
- Nagi mężczyzna. Akt męski w sztuce polskiej po 1945 roku [The Naked Man: The Male Nude in post-1945 Polish Art] (2012)

== Bibliography ==
- Jon Davis, "Towards an Intimate Democracy in Europe: Pawel Leszkowicz's Queer Curating", Journal of Curatorial Studies; February 2013, Vol. 2 Issue 1, p. 54-69.
