= Krytyka Polityczna =

Polish left-wing network

- Editor: Sławomir Sierakowski
- Frequency: Quarterly
- Publisher: Stanisław Brzozowski Association
- Founded: 2002; 24 years ago
- Based in: Warsaw, Poland
- Website: krytykapolityczna.pl
- ISSN: 1644-0919
- OCLC: 51747031

Krytyka Polityczna (Polish pronunciation: [ˈkrɨtɨka pɔliˈtɨt͡ʂna]; "The Political Critique") is a network of Polish left-wing intellectuals. The network is based around a journal of the same name founded by Sławomir Sierakowski in 2002, but is open to voices from across the political spectrum. The name draws on the tradition of Young Poland’s Krytyka (The Critique), a monthly magazine published by Wilhelm Feldman at the beginning of the 20th century, and on the samizdat Krytyka which served as a forum for opposition writers and journalists in the 1970s and 1980s.

== Stance ==
The aim of Krytyka Polityczna is to revive the tradition of engaged Polish intelligentsia. From the outset, the activities of Krytyka Polityczna have focused on three main fields: social science, culture, and politics. The purpose of this focus is to show that the social sciences, the arts and politics differ only in their means of expression, whereas what they have in common is the impact they have on social reality. The fundamental aim of Krytyka Polityczna is to prepare and introduce into the public sphere a project of struggle against economic and social exclusion. Another goal is to spread the idea of deep European integration.

As of 2019, Krytyka Polityczna is published quarterly.

== REDakcja (Redaction) and Nowy Wspaniały Świat (Brave New World) Community Center ==
In the years 2006-2009 the milieu of the Krytyka Polityczna ran REDakcja (Warsaw, Chmielna 26/19 St.) – a center serving the exchange of thought, debate, training, workshops, expositions of art, and presentation of social and political projects. REDakcja was also a distribution point for alternative and left-wing books and magazines. From its opening REDakcja held several hundred open meetings – literary debates, workshops, seminars, and screenings, as well as a few film festivals.

REDakcja became one of the most important cultural centres in the capital. In January 2008, it received the most important prize for cultural places: "Wdechy 2007" in the category: "Place of the Year", awarded by the biggest Polish newspaper Gazeta Wyborcza.

In November 2009, Krytyka Polityczna opened in the center of Warsaw Nowy Wspaniały Świat (Brave New World) Community Center – a place of artistic and academic meetings, film screenings, exhibition space and a cultural café. Among major projects held in the centre are Universität Krytyczny (Critical University) – open lectures and seminars held by most prominent professors and intellectuals from Poland and abroad, and Wolne Niedziele (Free Sundays) – weekly experimental and avant-garde music concerts. In July 2012, the community centre was closed.

== Krytyka Polityczna Local Clubs ==
Thanks to the activities of the sympathizers and cooperators of the Association in other Polish cities Krytyka Polityczna Clubs were created similar to REDakcja – they organize debates, social actions and other public events. By June 2009 22 such clubs have been established: Bialystok, Bydgoszcz, Bytom, Cieszyn, Gdansk, Głogów, Gniezno, Elblag, Jelenia Góra, Kalisz, Kielce, Kraków, Lublin, Lodz, Opole, Piła, Poznan, Siedlce, Szczecin, Toruń, Włocławek, Wrocław. The Network of Clubs constitutes the first attempt to build solid institutional foundations to enhance the commitment and integration of a large group of young people in the name of reviving the ethos of the engaged intelligentsia. Krytyka Polityczna has opened two common rooms - in the north (Tricity) and south (Cieszyn) of Poland which operate similarly to former REDakcja organizing multiple artistic and social events.

== The publishing house of the Political Critique ==
In 2006 The Political Critique, in cooperation with Ha!art, launched a new publishing project - The Political Critique Series. The first issue came out in December 2006.

In September 2007 people associated with Krytyka Polityczna established their own Krytyka Polityczna Publishing House. The aim is to introduce to the Polish audience the most important works of political philosophy and sociology, theory of culture and arts. The publishing house publishes transactions, works of Polish authors and important reissues.

Over 70 titles have been published up to August 2010 either in one of the eight-book series (Readers, Ideas, Canon, Journalistic, Literary, Jacek Kuron's Writings, Historical, Economic) or outside series.

Among the authors published by the press are: Louis Althusser, Timothy Garton Ash, Alain Badiou, Tadeusz Boy-Żeleński, Stanisław Brzozowski, Judith Butler, Manuel Castells, Roman Frydman, Bruno Latour, Chantal Mouffe, Marian Pankowski, Jacques Rancière, Nicholas Stern, Artur Żmijewski, Slavoj Žižek.

== Website ==
The Krytyka Polityczna website is an independent news provider (among other things, concerning social actions and cultural events), as well as a space for commentary (political analyses, columns, essays, reviews). One can find announcements, reports, photos and audio recordings of various meetings organized by Krytyka Polityczna. The website serves also as a forum for opinion and exchange. It serves as an archive of articles, pieces of published books, as well as the content of those journal issues that are no longer available for sale. In September 2007 Krytyka Polityczna launched the tv_kp project – a sort of internet TV medium with filmed commentaries, recordings of discussions, short videos, and invitations.

== The team ==
- Editorial Team: Yael Bartana (Arts Editor), Magdalena Błędowska, Kinga Dunin, Maciej Gdula, Dorota Głażewska, Maciej Kropiwnicki, Julian Kultyła (Vice Editor-in-chief), Sierakowski (Editor-in-chief), Michał Sutowski (Managing Editor), Agata Szczęśniak (Vice Editor-in-chief), Artur Żmijewski (Arts Editor)
- The Team: Agata Araszkiewicz, Michał Bilewicz, Katarzyna Błahuta, Magdalena Błędowska, Zygmunt Borawski, Michał Borucki, Jakub Bożek, Marcin Chałupka, Anna Delick (Sztokholm), Paweł Demirski, Karol Domański, Kinga Dunin, Joanna Erbel, Katarzyna Fidos, Bartosz Frąckowiak, Maciej Gdula, Dorota Głażewska, Katarzyna Górna, Agnieszka Graff, Agnieszka Grzybek, Krzysztof Iszkowski, Izabela Jasińska, Adam Jelonek, Jaś Kapela, Tomasz Kitliński, Maria Klaman, Karolina Krasuska, Małgorzata Kowalska, Maciej Kropiwnicki, Julian Kutyła, Łukasz Kuźma, Adam Leszczyński, Jarosław Lipszyc, Jakub Majmurek, Adam Mazur, Dorota Mieszek, Kuba Mikurda, Bartłomiej Modzelewski, Paweł Mościcki, Witold Mrozek, Maciej Nowak, Dorota Olko, Adam Ostolski, Joanna Ostrowska, Janusz Ostrowski, Tomasz Piątek, Konrad Pustoła, Magda Raczyńska, Joanna Rajkowska, Przemysław Sadura, Sierakowski, Jan Smoleński, Andreas Stadler (Nowy Jork), Beata Stępień, Kinga Stańczuk, Igor Stokfiszewski, Michał Sutowski, Michał Syska, Mikołaj Syska, Jakub Szafrański, Agata Szczęśniak, Kazimiera Szczuka, Barbara Szelewa, Jakub Szestowicki, Eliza Szybowicz, Magdalena Środa, Olga Tokarczuk, Krzysztof Tomasik, Joanna Tokarz, Justyna Turkowska, Karolina Walęcik, Błażej Warkocki, Agnieszka Wiśniewska, Katarzyna Wojciechowska, Wawrzyniec Zakrzewski, Wojtek Zrałek-Kossakowski, Artur Żmijewski

== See also ==
- List of magazines in Poland
