= Małgorzata =

- Pronunciation: Polish: [mawɡɔˈʐata]
- Language: Polish

Origin
- Language: Ancient Greek
- Origin: μαργαρίτης
- Meaning: 'pearl'

Other names
- Related names: Margaret

Małgorzata is a common Polish female given name derived through Latin Margarita from Ancient Greek: μαργαρίτης, romanized: margarítēs, lit. 'pearl'. It is equivalent to the English Margaret. Its diminutive forms include Małgośka, Małgosia, Gosia, Gośka, Gosieńka, Gosiunia.

== Art ==
- Małgorzata Dawidek Gryglicka (born 1976), Polish painter
- Małgorzata Macuga (born 1967), professionally known as Goshka Macuga, Polish-born artist
- Małgorzata Mirga-Tas (born 1978), Polish-Romani artist
- Małgorzata Turewicz Lafranchi (born 1961), Polish visual artist

== Music ==
- Małgorzata Babiarz (born 1984), professionally known as Megitza, Polish singer, double bass player, and composer
- Małgorzata Jamroży (born 1991), professionally known as Margaret (singer), Polish singer and songwriter
- Małgorzata Uściłowska (born 1987), better known by her stage name Lanberry, Polish singer and song-writer
- Małgorzata Walewska (born 1965), Polish opera singer
- Małgorzata Zwierzchowska (1961–2013), Polish singer and flautist

== Law ==
- Małgorzata Gersdorf (born 1952), Polish lawyer and judge
- Małgorzata Manowska (born 1964), Polish academic and jurist
- Małgorzata Sekuła-Szmajdzińska (born 1956), Polish lawyer and politician

== Literature ==
- Małgorzata Musierowicz (born 1945), Polish writer
- Małgorzata Pośpiech, also known as Margaret Pospiech, Polish writer
- Małgorzata Rejmer (born 1985), Polish writer
- Małgorzata Szejnert (born 1936), Polish writer and journalist

== Politics ==
- Małgorzata Bartyzel (1955-2016), Polish politician
- Małgorzata Chmiel (born 1953), Polish politician
- Małgorzata Golińska (born 1980), Polish politician
- Małgorzata Gosiewska (born 1966), Polish politician
- Małgorzata Kidawa-Błońska (born 1957), Polish politician
- Małgorzata Niezabitowska (born 1948), Polish journalist and politician
- Małgorzata Omilanowska (born 1960), Polish art historian and politician
- Małgorzata Ostrowska (1958-2024), Polish politician
- Małgorzata Pępek (born 1961), Polish politician
- Małgorzata Rohde (born 1962), Polish politician
- Małgorzata Sadurska (born 1975), Polish politician
- Małgorzata Stryjska (born 1953), Polish politician
- Małgorzata Tkacz-Janik (born 1965), Polish feminist and politician
- Małgorzata Tracz (born 1985), Polish politician
- Małgorzata Wassermann (born 1978), Polish politician
- Małgorzata Wypych, Polish politician

== Science ==
- Małgorzata Bogdan, Polish statistician
- Malgorzata Dobrowolska-Furdyna (born 1972), Polish physicist
- Malgorzata Dubiel, Polish mathematician
- Małgorzata Górska, Polish environmentalist
- Małgorzata Jarosińska-Jedynak (born 1979), Polish engineer
- Małgorzata Kalinowska-Iszkowska (born 1946), Polish computer scientist, educator, and activist
- Małgorzata Klimek (born 1957), Polish mathematician
- Małgorzata Kossut (born 1950), Polish neuroscientist
- Malgorzata Lamacz (1949-2017), American human sexuality researcher
- Malgorzata Marek-Sadowska, Polish and American electronic engineer
- Małgorzata Peszyńska (born 1962), Polish and American mathematician
- Małgorzata Tarasiewicz, Polish political scientist and politician
- Małgorzata Więcek, also known as Margaret Wiecek, Polish mathematician
- Małgorzata Zaleska (born 1969), Polish economist
- Malgorzata S. Zywno, Canadian engineer

== Sport ==
- Małgorzata Babicka (born 1985), Polish basketball player
- Małgorzata Barlak-Kamasińska (born 1952), Polish gymnast
- Małgorzata Birbach (born 1960), Polish long-distance runner
- Małgorzata Breś (born 1959), Polish fencer
- Małgorzata Chojnacka (gymnast) (born 1947), Polish gymnast
- Małgorzata Cybulska (born 1998), Polish equestrian
- Małgorzata Czajczyńska (born 1981), Polish canoeist
- Małgorzata Dąbrowska (born 1956), Polish historian
- Małgorzata Dłużewska (born 1951), Polish rower
- Małgorzata Dunecka (born 1956), Polish sprinter
- Małgorzata Dydek (1974-2011), Polish professional basketball player
- Małgorzata Gajewska (born 1962), Polish field hockey player
- Małgorzata Galwas (born 1973), Polish backstroke swimmer
- Małgorzata Gapska (born 1983), Polish handball player
- Małgorzata Glinka-Mogentale (born 1978), Polish volleyball player
- Małgorzata Górnicka (born 1979), Polish judoka
- Małgorzata Grajcar, Polish former competitive ice dancer
- Małgorzata Grec (born 1999), Polish footballer
- Małgorzata Guzowska (born 1959), Polish heptathlete
- Małgorzata Hołub-Kowalik (born 1992), Polish sprinter
- Małgorzata Ignasiak (born 1995), Polish paralympic sprinter
- Małgorzata Jankowska (born 1983), Polish para table tennis player
- Małgorzata Jasińska (born 1984), Polish racing cyclist
- Małgorzata Kawalska (born 1952), Polish rower
- Małgorzata Książkiewicz (born 1967), Polish sport shooter
- Małgorzata Kozaczuk (born 1988), Polish fencer
- Małgorzata Lipska (born 1963), Polish field hockey player
- Małgorzata Mesjasz (born 1997), Polish footballer
- Małgorzata Pskit (born 1976), Polish hurdler
- Małgorzata Agnieszka Rdest (born 1993), also known as Gosia Rdest, Polish racing driver and businesswoman
- Małgorzata Różycka (born 1962), Polish swimmer
- Małgorzata Ruchała (born 1961), Polish cross-country skier
- Małgorzata Śmieszek (born 1996), Polish volleyball player
- Małgorzata Sobańska (born 1969), Polish long-distance runner
- Małgorzata Sobieraj (born 1982), Polish archer
- Małgorzata Stasiak (born 1988), Polish handball player
- Małgorzata Trybańska-Strońska (born 1981), Polish long jumper
- Małgorzata Wiese-Jóźwiak (born 1961), Polish chess player
- Małgorzata Wilczek (born 1944), Polish gymnast
- Małgorzata Wojtkowiak (born 1982), Polish fencer
- Małgorzata Wojtyra (born 1989), Polish track cyclist
- Małgorzata Wysocka (born 1979), Polish road cyclist
- Małgorzata Zadura (born 1982), Polish hammer thrower

== Television and film ==
- Małgorzata Braunek (1947-2014), Polish actress
- Małgorzata Buczkowska (born 1976), Polish actress
- Małgorzata Dobrowolska (born 1958), better known by her stage name Gosia Dobrowolska, Polish-born Australian actress
- Małgorzata Foremniak (born 1967), Polish actress
- Małgorzata Gebel (born 1955), Polish actress
- Małgorzata Gryniewicz (born 1985), Polish film director
- Małgorzata Hajewska-Krzysztofik (born 1965), Polish actress
- Małgorzata Kożuchowska (born 1971), Polish actress
- Małgorzata Kowalczyk, Polish documentary film director
- Małgorzata Łupina (born 1969), Polish film director
- Małgorzata Pieczyńska (born 1960), Polish actress
- Małgorzata Pritulak (born 1947), Polish theatre and film actress
- Małgorzata Socha (born 1980), Polish actress
- Małgorzata Szumowska (born 1973), Polish film director
- Małgorzata Zajączkowska (born 1956), Polish actress

== Other fields ==
- Małgorzata Adamkiewicz (born 1966), Polish businesswoman
- Małgorzata Bocheńska (1949-2018), Polish journalist
- Princess Malgorzata Izabella Czartoryska (1902-1929), Polish princess
- Małgorzata Dąbrowska (born 1956), Polish historian
- Małgorzata Dzieduszycka-Ziemilska (born 1949), Polish journalist, theatre critic, and diplomat
- Małgorzata Fornalska (born 1902-1944), Polish communist and anti-Nazi resistance fighter
- Małgorzata E. Grebowicz (born 1973), also known as Margret Grebowicz, Polish philosopher, author, and former jazz vocalist
- Małgorzata Kotowska (died 1690), Polish lady-in-waiting and unofficial diplomatic emissary
- Malgorzata Nowacka (born 1974), Polish choreographer and dancer
- Małgorzata Rozumecka (born 1975), Polish criminal
- Małgorzata Rożniecka (born 1978), Polish model and beauty queen, winner of Miss International 2001
- Małgorzata Szczęśniak (born 1954), Polish stage and costume designer
- Małgorzata Szewczyk (1828-1905), Polish nun
- Małgorzata Tusk (born 1957), Polish historian, wife of politician Donald Tusk
- Małgorzata Wasilewska (born 1960), Polish diplomat

== See also ==
- Polish name
