= Timeline of Łódź =

Timeline of the Łódź history
Affiliations

Kingdom of Poland 1300s–1569
Polish–Lithuanian Commonwealth 1569–1793
Kingdom of Prussia 1793–1807
Duchy of Warsaw 1807–1815
Congress Poland (Russian Empire) 1815–1916
Kingdom of Poland 1916–1918
Republic of Poland 1918–1939
Nazi Germany 1939–1945
People's Republic of Poland 1945–1989
Republic of Poland 1989–present

The following is a timeline of the history of the city of Łódź, Poland.

== Prior to 19th century ==
- 1332 - Łódź mentioned as the village Łodzia in a document of Duke Władysław the Hunchback of the Polish Piast dynasty
- 1423 - Łódź granted city rights by Polish King Władysław II Jagiełło
- 1487 - Polish King Casimir IV Jagiellon visited Łódź.
- 1496 - Polish King John I Albert confirmed the establishment of two annual fairs and a weekly market in Łódź.
- 1793
  - City annexed by Prussia in the Second Partition of Poland and included within the newly formed province of South Prussia.
  - Population: 190.

== 19th century ==
- 1806 - Town joins the Napoleonic Duchy of Warsaw.
- 1815 - Town becomes part of Russian client state Congress Poland per Congress of Vienna.
- 1820 - Antoni Czarkowski becomes mayor.
- 1824 - Lodka settlement developed.
- 1827 - K.F. Wendisch factory in business.
- 1828 - Slazaki settlement developed.
- 1829 - Population: 4,273.
- 1837 - Ludwig Geyer factory in business.
- 1839 - White Factory built.
- 1852 - Industrialist Karl Scheibler in business.
- 1860 - Population: 31,500.
- 1861 - Stara Synagogue built.
- 1863
  - 31 January: A Polish insurgent unit entered the city without a fight in the first days of the January Uprising, and seized weapons and 18,000 rubles for the uprising.
  - 18 June: Clash between Polish insurgents and Russian troops.
  - 29 September: Clash between Polish insurgents and Russian troops.
  - Lodzer Zeitung bilingual Polish-German newspaper begins publication.
- 1866 - Koluszki-Łódź railway begins operating.
- 1867
  - Congress Poland forcibly integrated with of the Russian Empire.
  - Sudden death of Shakespearean actor Ira Aldridge before his scheduled performance at a local theater.
- 1868 - Łódź Fabryczna railway station built.
- 1870 - Studio Theatre opened.
- 1872 - Moscow-Łódź railway begins operating.
- 1878 - Manufaktura textile mill built.
- 1881
  - Great Synagogue built.
  - Population: 49,592.
- 1884 - Alexander Nevsky Cathedral built.
- 1888 - Karl Scheibler's Chapel built.
- 1892 - Izrael Poznański factory built.
- 1897 - Population: 314,780.
- 1899
  - First cinema in Poland (Gabinet Iluzji) founded by brothers Władysław and Antoni Krzemiński.
  - Hazomir Choral Society founded.
- 1900 - Population: 351,570.

== 20th century ==
=== 1900s–1930s ===
- 1901 - Krzemiński cinema active.
- 1902 - Łódź Kaliska railway station built.
- 1904 - Ezras Israel Synagogue built.
- 1905 - 21–25 June: Łódź insurrection.
- 1908 - ŁKS Łódź football club (later multi-section club) founded.
- 1910 - Widzew Łódź football club formed.
- 1914
  - 11 November: Battle of Łódź begins near city.
  - December: Germans in power.
- 1915 - Bałuty becomes part of city.
- 1918 - Poland regains independence and the city becomes again part of Poland.
- 1920 - Catholic Diocese of Łódź established.

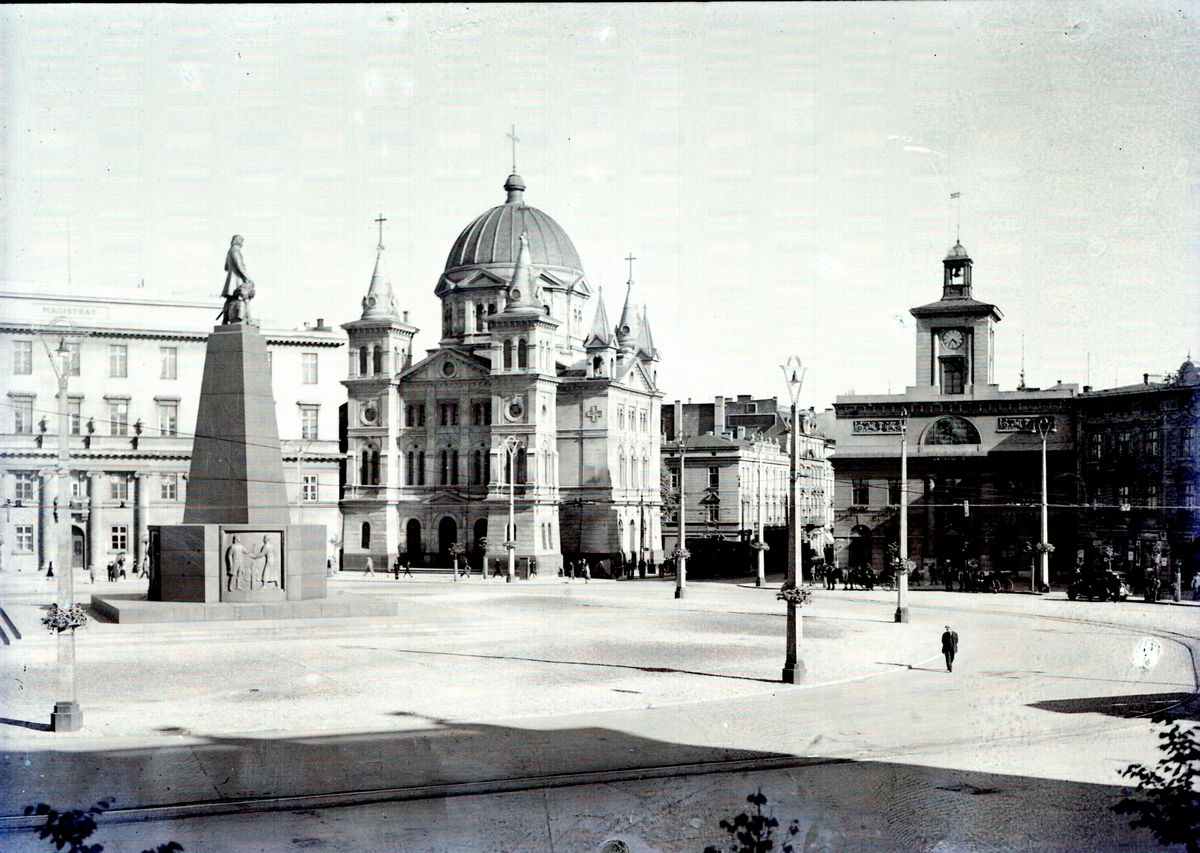
Plac Wolności ("Liberty Square") with the Tadeusz Kościuszko Monument and the Holy Spirit Church in 1930

- 1922 - City becomes capital of Łódź Voivodeship (province).
- 1925 - Łódź Airport opens.
- 1928 - Osiedle Montwiłła-Mireckiego luxury neighborhood founded.
- 1930
  - Stadion Widzewa (stadium) opens.
  - Municipal Museum of History and Art inaugurated.
  - December: Monument of Polish national hero Tadeusz Kościuszko unveiled at Plac Wolności in the city center.
- 1931
  - January: Museum of Ethnography established.
  - ŁKS Łódź wins its first Polish men's volleyball championship.
- 1937 - HKS Łódź wins its first Polish women's volleyball championship.

=== World War II (1939–1945) ===
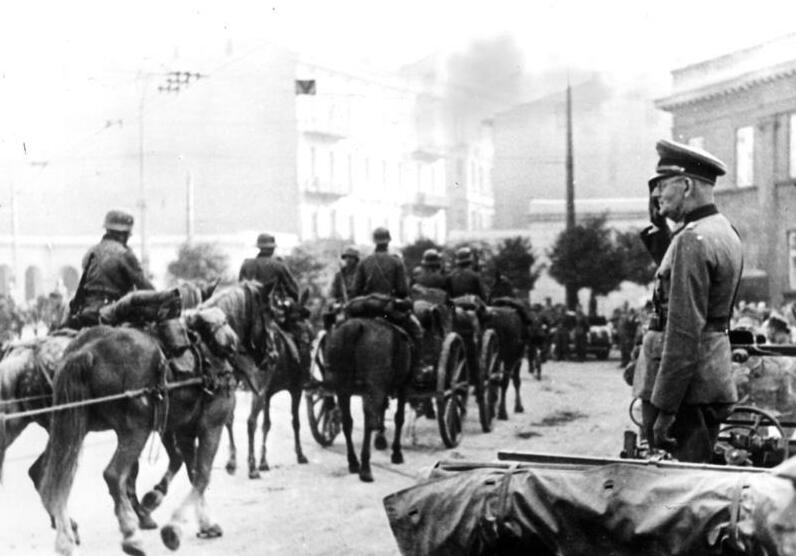
Invading German troops in Łódź in September 1939

- 1939
  - 2 September: Germany carried out first air raids, bombing the airport and the Łódź Kaliska train station.
  - 3 September: Further air raids carried out by Germany. The Germans bombed a railway station in the Widzew district, a power plant, a gas plant, a thread factory and many houses.
  - 5 September: The Germans air raided the airport again.
  - 6 September: The Germans air raided a historic palace which housed the command of the Polish Łódź Army.
  - 6 September: the Citizens' Committee of the City of Łódź established.
  - 6–8 September: Battle of Łódź during the German invasion of Poland, which started World War II.
  - 9 September: German troops entered the city, beginning of the German occupation.
  - 11 September: The Germans issued the first occupation decrees.
  - 12 September: The German Einsatzgruppe III entered the city to commit various crimes against the population.
  - 12–15 September: The Germans carried out searches of local county offices and Polish police buildings.
  - 16 September: Local administration took over by a German official, D. Leiste from Rhineland.
  - 21 September: The Germans carried out mass searches in the present-day district of Chojny.
  - September: The Germans carried out first arrests of Poles as part of the Intelligenzaktion and established first prisons for arrested Poles.
  - 12 October – 4 November: City becomes seat of Nazi German General Government of occupied Poland.
  - 31 October: A German transit camp for Poles arrested in the Intelligenzaktion established in the present-day district of Ruda Pabianicka.
  - November: Radogoszcz concentration camp established by the Germans. Its prisoners were mostly people from Łódź, Pabianice and other nearby settlements.
  - 9 November: City annexed directly into Nazi Germany; the Germans destroyed the monument of Polish national hero Tadeusz Kościuszko.
  - 9 November: First prisoners detained in the Radogoszcz concentration camp.
  - November: Hundreds of Poles from Łódź and the region massacred by the Germans in the forest in the present-day district of Łagiewniki as part of the Intelligenzaktion.
  - City renamed "Litzmannstadt" to erase traces of Polish origin.
  - 11 December: The Germans massacred 70 Polish prisoners of the Radogoszcz camp in Łagiewniki.
  - 13 December: The Germans massacred 40 Polish prisoners of the Radogoszcz camp in Łagiewniki.
  - December: 65 prisoners from the transit camp in Pabianice deported to the Radogoszcz concentration camp and then massacred in Łagiewniki.
  - 31 December: First expulsions of Poles from Osiedle Montwiłła-Mireckiego carried out.
  - Hundreds of Poles from Łódź massacred by the Germans in the nearby village of Lućmierz-Las.

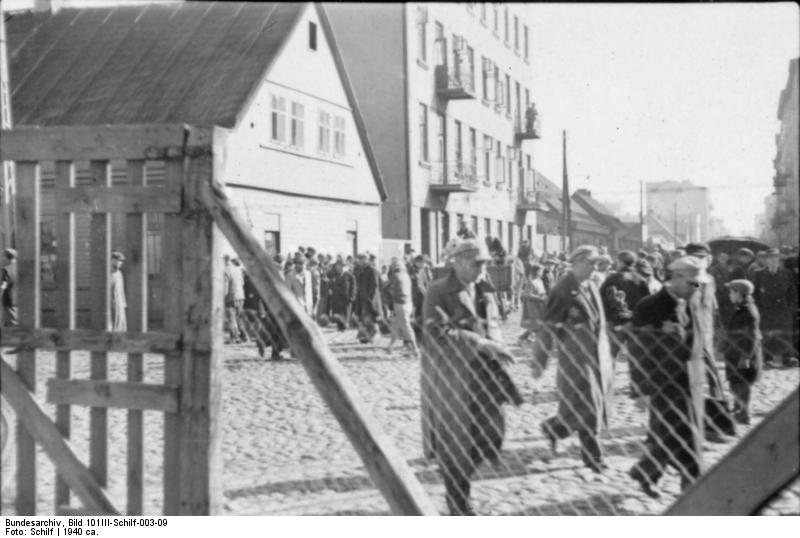
Łódź Ghetto in 1940

- 1940
  - 14–15 January: German police and Selbstschutz carried out mass expulsions of Poles from Osiedle Montwiłła-Mireckiego.
  - February: More prisoners from the liquidated transit camp in Pabianice imprisoned in the Radogoszcz camp; Radogoszcz camp converted into the Radogoszcz prison.
  - February: Łódź Ghetto formed.
  - Hundreds of Poles from Łódź massacred by the Germans in the nearby village of Lućmierz-Las.
  - March: 11 Polish boy scouts from Łódź massacred by the Germans in the Okręglik forest near Zgierz.
  - April–May: The Russians committed the large Katyn massacre, among the victims of which were over 1,200 Poles, who either were born or lived in Łódź or the region before the war.
- 1941
  - March: German transit prisoner-of-war camp Dulag 240 established.
  - June: German prisoner-of-war camp Stalag Luft II relocated from Barth to the present-day district of Ruda Pabianicka.
  - July: Dulag 240 camp relocated to Jabłonna.
  - November: 5,007 Romani people deported by the Germans from German-occupied Burgenland to Łódź and imprisoned in a new German camp.

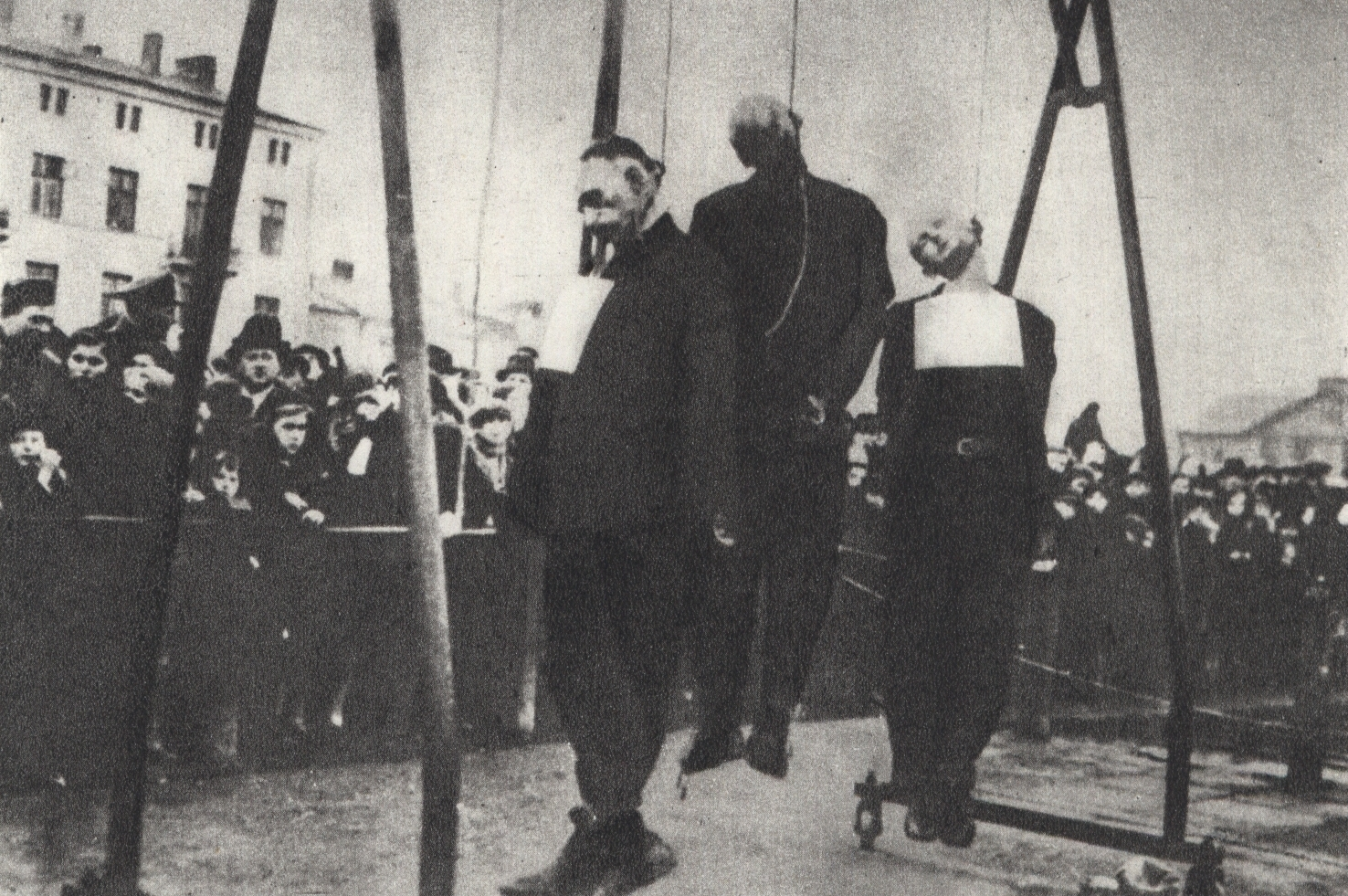
Public execution of Poles in German-occupied Łódź in 1942

- 1942
  - January: The Germans dissolved the camp for Romani people and exterminated its prisoners in the Chełmno extermination camp.
  - 9 October: Two prisoners of war escaped from the Stalag Luft II in the only known case of a successful escape from the camp.
  - German concentration camp for kidnapped Polish children of 2 to 16 years of age established in the city. It was nicknamed "little Auschwitz" due to its conditions.
- 1943
  - April: Subcamp of the Stalag XXI-D POW camp established.
  - The Germans established a forced labour camp for around 800 English prisoners of war in the Olechów neighbourhood.
- 1944
  - August: Łódź Ghetto liquidated.
  - September: Most POWs transported from Stalag Luft II to the Stalag Luft III camp in Żagań.
  - 21 November: Stalag Luft II POW camp liquidated.
- 1945
  - German concentration camp for kidnapped Polish children disestablished.
  - 17 January: City taken by the Soviet Army and afterwards restored to Poland.

=== 1945–2000 ===
- 1945
  - Łódź University of Technology, University of Łódź and Public Academy of Arts established.
  - Dziennik Łodzki newspaper begins publication.

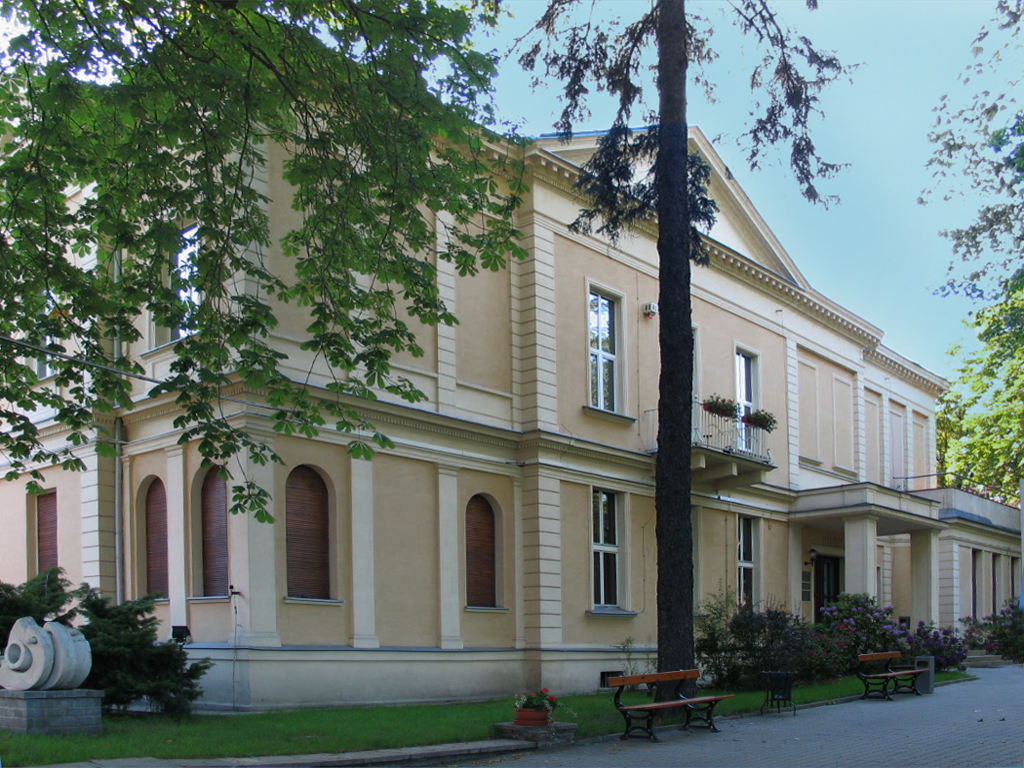
National Film School in Łódź

- 1946 - Retkinia included within city limits.
- 1947 - Animation studio Se-ma-for founded in Łódź.
- 1948 - National Film School in Łódź established.
- 1950 - Medical Academy of Łódź established.
- 1953 - ŁKS Łódź wins its first Polish men's basketball championship.
- 1957 - Russkiĭ Golos newspaper begins publication.
- 1958
  - Łódź Heat Power Stations commissioned.
  - ŁKS Łódź wins its first Polish football championship.
- 1960 - Central Museum of Textiles established.

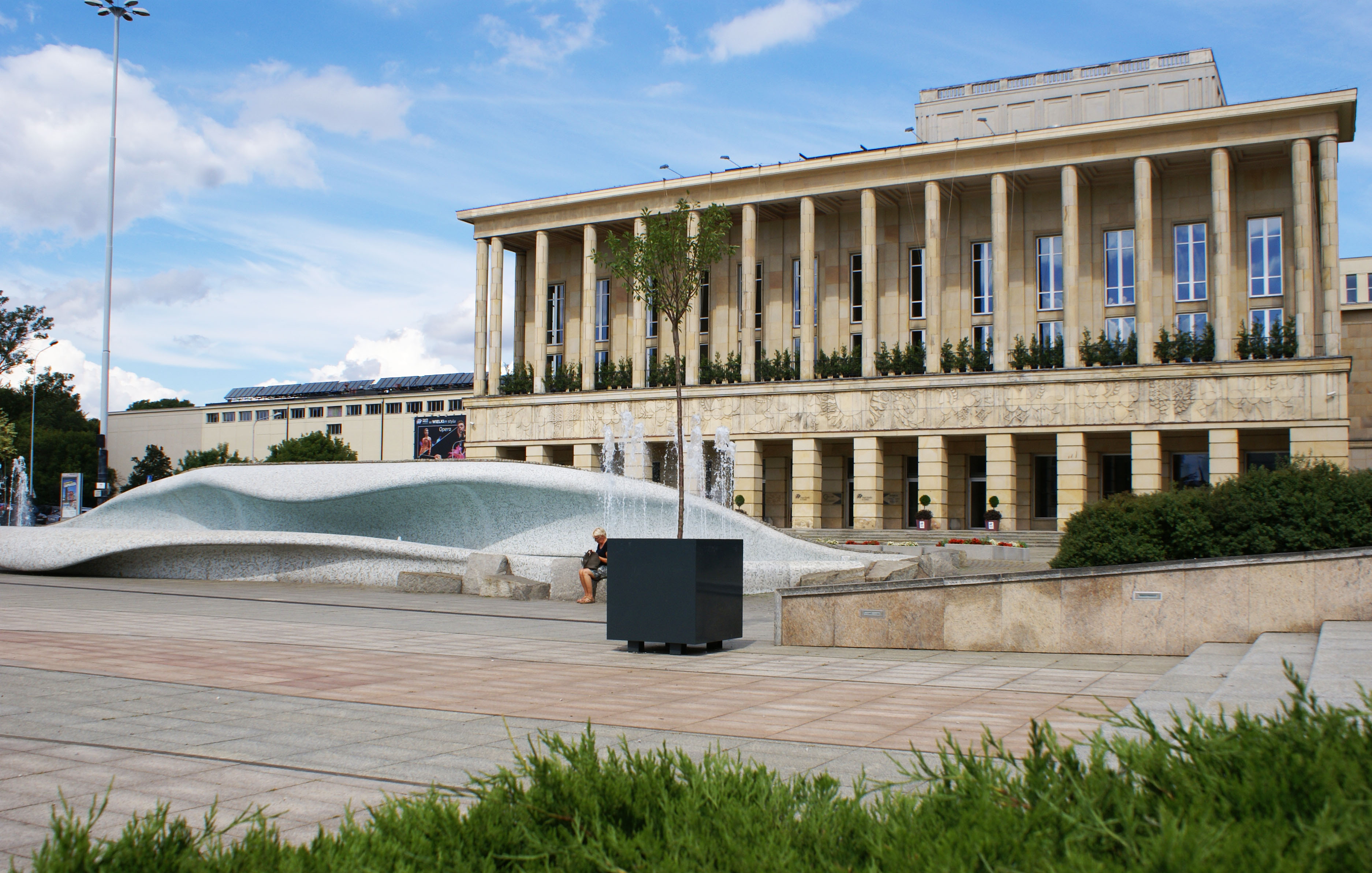
Grand Theatre, Łódź

- 1967
  - ŁKS Łódź wins its first Polish women's basketball championship.
  - Grand Theatre opens.
- 1968
  - Ballet festival begins.
  - Start Łódź wins its first Polish women's volleyball championship.
- 1973 - National choreographic competition begins.
- 1974 - Population: 784,000.
- 1975
  - Stadion ŁKS (stadium) built.
  - Museum of the City of Łódź active.
- 1978 - Monument of writer Władysław Reymont unveiled.
- 1981
  - April: Łódź co-hosts the 1981 European Wrestling Championships.
  - Widzew Łódź wins its first Polish football championship.
  - Protest against food shortage.
- 1983
  - Anilana Łódź wins its first Polish men's handball championship.
  - ŁKS Łódź wins its first Polish women's volleyball championship.
  - Budowlani Łódź wins its first Polish rugby championship.
- 1984 - Monument of Stanisław Staszic unveiled in the Staszic Park in the city center.
- 1991 - 2 October: Visit of British Prime Minister Margaret Thatcher.
- 1992 - Roman Catholic Diocese of Łódź promoted to archdiocese.
- 1996 - KP Łódź beach soccer team founded.
- 1998 - Higher School of Art and Design established.
- 2000 - Monument of Pope John Paul II unveiled at the Piotrkowska Street.

== 21st century ==
- 2001 - Twin town partnership signed between Łódź and Örebro, Sweden.
- 2002
  - Jerzy Kropiwnicki becomes mayor.
  - Population: 785,134; province 2,612,900.
- 2004 - Łódź Biennale active.
- 2006 - Manufaktura shopping mall opens.

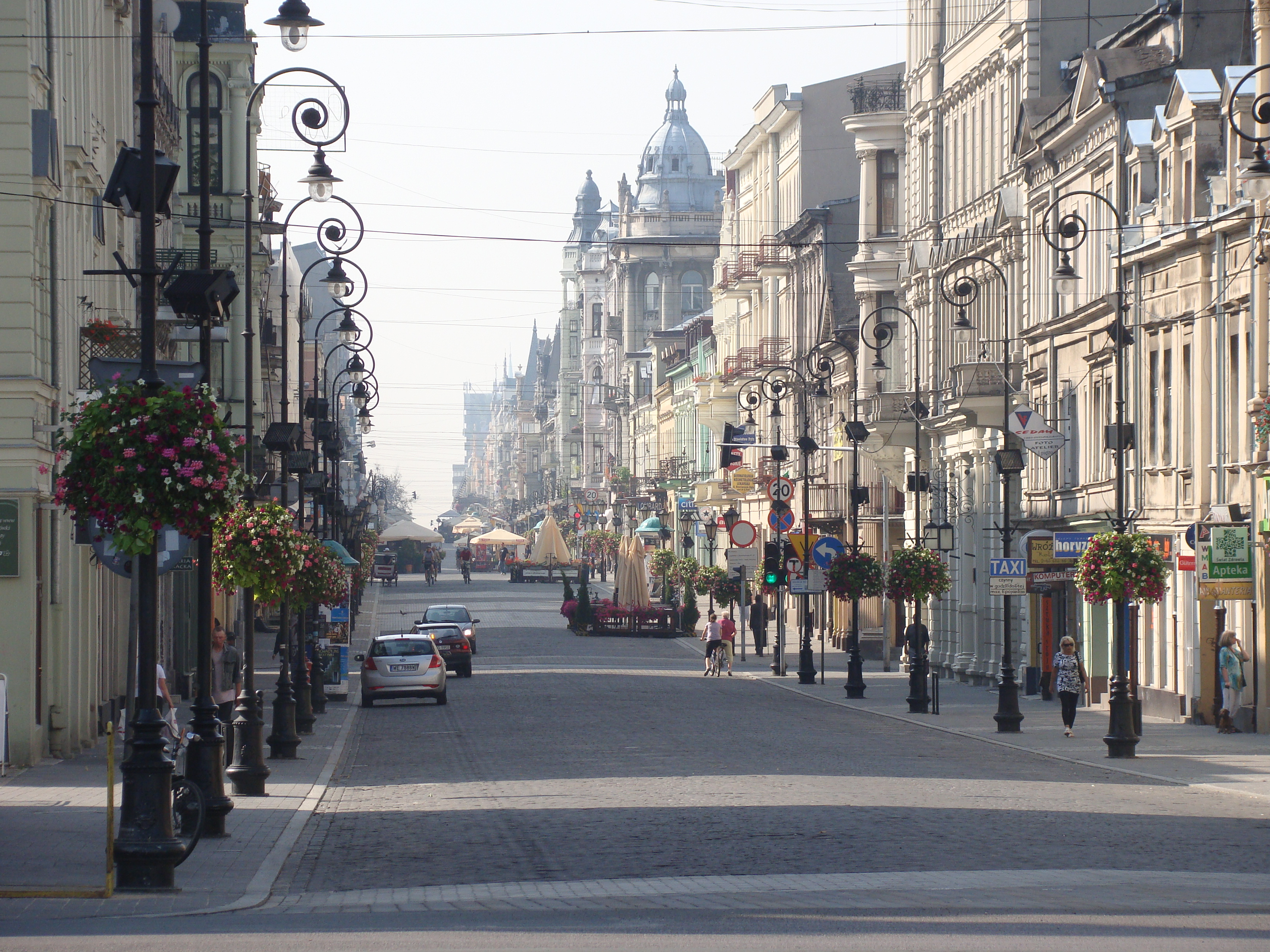
Piotrkowska Street in 2011

- 2008
  - 19 May: Twin town partnership signed between Łódź and Szeged, Hungary.
  - September: Open-air Museum of the Łódź Wooden Architecture opened.
- 2009
  - Arena Łódź opens.
  - Łódź co-hosts the EuroBasket 2009.
- 2010 - Hanna Zdanowska becomes mayor.
- 2011 - Łódź co-hosts the EuroBasket Women 2011.
- 2013
  - Rail freight transport between Łódź and China started.
  - 10 November: Khachkar commemorating the victims of the Armenian genocide unveiled.
- 2014 - Łódź co-hosts the 2014 FIVB Volleyball Men's World Championship.
- 2015 - Twin town partnership signed between Łódź and Chengdu, China.
- 2017
  - June: Łódź hosts the 2017 Łódź Sevens tournament of the 2017 Rugby Europe Sevens Grand Prix Series.
  - December: Łódź co-hosts the 2017 FIVB Volleyball Men's Club World Championship.
- 2018 - Łódź hosts the first ever Mixed Doubles Łódź curling tournament.
- 2019
  - May–June: Łódź co-hosts the 2019 FIFA U-20 World Cup.
  - November: Honorary Consulate of Armenia opened in Łódź.

== See also ==
- Łódź history
- History of Łódź
- List of mayors of Łódź
- List of years in Poland

== Bibliography ==
=== in English ===
- "Lodz", Jewish Encyclopedia, vol. 8, New York, 1907, hdl:2027/osu.32435029752870
- "Lodz" . Encyclopædia Britannica. Vol. 16 (11th ed.). 1910. p. 862.
- "Lodz", Russia, with Teheran, Port Arthur, and Peking, Leipzig: Karl Baedeker, 1914, OCLC 1328163
- Zygmunt Gostkowski (1959). "Popular Interest in the Municipal Elections of Łódź, Poland". Public Opinion Quarterly. 23 (3): 371–381. doi:10.1086/266889. JSTOR 2746388.
- Bronislawa Kopczynska-Jaworska (1983). "Working Class Traditions in Łódź". Urban Anthropology. 12 (3/4): 217–243. JSTOR 40553010.
- Irena Popławska; Stefan Muthesius (1986). "Poland's Manchester: 19th-Century Industrial and Domestic Architecture in Łódź". Journal of the Society of Architectural Historians. 45 (2): 148–160. doi:10.2307/990093. JSTOR 990093.
- Zysiak, Agata et al. From Cotton and Smoke: Łódź - Industrial City and Discourses of Asynchronous Modernity, 1897-1994 (Krakow: Jagiellonian University Press, 2019). online review

=== in other languages ===
- Oskara Flatt (1853). Opis miasta Łodzi: pod względem historycznym, statystycznym i przemysłowym [Description of Łódź: historical, statistical and industrial] (in Polish). Warszawa: Drukarni gazety codziennej.
- O. Flatt (1866), "Łódź", Tygodnik Illustrowany (in Polish), vol. 13, no. 330, pp. 28–31
- Alfred Scholz (1904). Die Baumwollindustrie im Lodzer Industrierayon 1823-1903 (in German). Breslau: R. Nischkowsky.
- F. Bielschowski (1912). Die Textilindustrie des Lodzer Rayons (in German). Leipzig.
