= Heinrich Kaan =

19th century physician

- Born: 8 February 1816; Vienna, Austrian Empire
- Died: 24 May 1893 (aged 77); Vienna, Austria-Hungary

Heinrich Kaan (Russian: Генрих Каан; 8 February 1816 – 24 May 1893) was a 19th-century physician known for his seminal contributions to early sexology. Different sources identify him as Ruthenian (an ethnic group living in what is now Belarus and Ukraine) or as Russian. He was the personal physician to the Czar.

== Psychopathia Sexualis ==
Kaan is primarily known for an early scientific approach to sexology i.e. a scientifically based theoretical study of sex as opposed to earlier fields of erotology—the more practical study of lovemaking. He published his main work Psychopathia Sexualis in 1844 in Leipzig in Latin and it has been translated into English and German. A direct translation of the title is Psychopathies of Sexuality. In this work he reinterpreted the Christian sexual sins as diseases of the mind.

Until then, concepts like deviation, aberration, and perversion were interpreted in a theological context as "false" religious beliefs or heresy. Kaan's novel idea was to turn them into medical concepts, to reinterpret them as mental diseases. Physicians and psychiatrists after him were quick to take up these ideas - a process which collectively is referred to as the medicalization of sin in cultural history. It is also referred to as "degeneracy theory".

Kaan's work was within the "onanism literature" tradition of his time. To Kaan, masturbation was at the root of all sexual disorders, deviations and unnatural lusts as it involved extravagant fantasies. He also considered heterosexual intercourse as psychopathological, if it comprised sexual fantasies. His main goal was to fight such sexual psychopathies, above all masturbation.

Michel Foucault referred to Kaan's work in his mid-1970s lectures on the discourse of the nature of normality and abnormality and in the first volume of his work The History of Sexuality. According to Foucault, Kaan's work was the first medical text exclusively devoted to the study of sexuality. He said during a course of lectures he did in 1974-75 at the Collège de France, that the Psychopathia Sexualis” (1844) “was the first treatise of psychiatry to speak only of sexual pathology but the last (monograph) to speak of sexuality solely in Latin.” However, Foucault recognized it as a symptom of a shift in the discourse on sexuality, rather than necessarily an influential work in itself. Scholars have acknowledged Kaan's contributions, relative to those of Richard von Krafft-Ebing and Sigmund Freud.

== See also ==
- Flesh (theology)
- Religious views on masturbation

== Works ==
- Aus Padua! In Anton Benkert (Hrsg.), Wuth des Elements und Milde des Menschenherzens. Pesth 1838, pp. 90-92 [written as a Medical student in Padua on the occasion of the Pest flood in 1838]
- Dissertatio inauguralis medico pharmacologica de Alcaloidibus. Viennae 1840 [Kaan's medical thesis of June 1840]
- Rückerinnerungen aus meinem Badeleben. In Gesundheits-Zeitung, 1840, IV. Jahrg., No. 91, pp. 729-733; No. 103, pp. 825-828
- Die Penitentiair-Gefängnisse. In Allgemeine Theaterzeitung, 1842, Nro. 231, p. 1022; Nro. 232, p. 1026 [discusses the penitentiary system's dual aims of safeguarding society and rehabilitating criminals]
- "Psychopathia Sexualis". Lipsiae 1844
- Bericht über die Leistungen der kalten eisenhaltigen Mineralquellen bei St. Petersburg auf dem Landgute des Grafen Koucheleff-Besborodko, unweit Ochta's. In Medizinische Zeitung Russlands, 1844, No. 12, pp. 91-93; 1845, No. 17, 134-135; 1846, No. 16, pp. 126-127
- Versuch einer topographisch-medicinischen Skizze von Meran. Innsbruck 1851
- Gedanken eines Arztes über die Cholera als Weltseuche. Innsbruck 1854
- Die Homöopathie in Tirol. In Homöopathische Vierteljahrschrift, 1856, 7, 325-337
- Analogien und Differenzen. In Homöopathische Vierteljahrschrift, 1858, 9, 336-346
- Balneologische Skizzen. In Homöopathische Vierteljahrschrift, 1858, 9, 202-231
- Die Homöopathie. Eine Selbstanklage vor dem Richterstuhle der Vernunft. In Prager Medicinische Monatsschrift für Homöopathie, 6, 1858, 103-105; 119-121; 134-135
- Die Krankheiten unserer Zeit. In Erheiterungen. Beiblatt zur "Aschaffenburger Zeitung", 1858 [an essay in 12 parts, published between May 22 and July 8, which originally appeared in Otto Wigand's Die Sonntags-Post]
- Der Wechsel des Klima's als Heilmittel bei Lungenkranken, mit besonderer Berücksichtigung Meran's. In Homöopathische Vierteljahrschrift, 1858, 9, 85-94
- St. Wolfgang in der Fusch. Eine balneologische Skizze. In Prager Medicinische Monatsschrift für Homöopathie, 8, April 1860, 55-56; Mai 1860, 71-73
- Der Badeort Fusch im Pinzgau. St. Wolfgang in der Fusch. Ende August 1860. In Salzburger Zeitung, 197, August 28, 1860
- Psychiatrische Skizzen. In Homöopathische Vierteljahrschrift, 1861, 12, pp. 81-99 [contains a continuation to Psychopathia Sexualis]
- Klimatisch-therapeutische Kuren. In Wiener Medizinal-Halle, 1862, 3, 228-229; 468-469; 479-480
- Zur Lehre vom Merkurialismus. In Medizinisch-chirurgische Rundschau, 1862, 3, 1-20
- Zerstreute Blätter aus dem Tagebuche eines Arztes. In Prager Medicinische Monatschrift, 10, 180-183
- Balneologische Skizzen. In Homöopathische Vierteljahrschrift, 1863, 14, 251-256; 358-368
- Beiträge zur Gynäkologie. III. Die Syphilis. In Homöopathische Vierteljahrschrift, 1863, 14, 331-359
- Klimatisch-therapeutische Kurorte. In Wiener Medizinal-Halle, 1863, 4, 151-152; 183-186
- Aus dem Tagebuche eines Arztes. In Prager Medicinische Monatsschrift für Homöopathie, 12, 1864, 37-40; 55-56; 90-91; 117-118; 136-137
- Beiträge zur Gynäkologie. V. Menstruations-Störungen. In Homöopathische Vierteljahrschrift, 1864, 15, 334-350
- Der Curgast in Ischl. Wien 1864 (2nd ed., Wien 1868; 3rd ed., Wien, 1875)
- Neujahrs-Gedanken über Ischl. In Prager Medicinische Monatschrift, 1864, 12, 21-24 [the authorship was announced in the March issue of the same year]
- Non multa sed multum. In Homöopathische Vierteljahrschrift, 1864, 15, 134-136; 351-352; 474-480; 1865, 16, 126-128; 242-244
- Ischl, im September. In Neue Zeischrift für Homoeopathische Klinik, 1866, Bd. XI.(XV.), 151-152; 159-160
- Beiträge zur Gynäkologie. In Allgemeine Homöopathische Zeitung, 1866, 72, 180-181; 187-189; 196-199; 202-206
- Meran und Ischl. Eine Parallele. In Wiener Medizinische Wochenschrift, 1866, 16. Jg., Nr. 45, 723-725; Nr. 46, 741-742
- Die Objektivität in der Medicin. In Neue Zeitschrift für Homoeopathische Klinik, 1867, Bd. XII (XVI), 121-123
- Ischl et ses environs. Vienne 1879
- La Suisse autrichienne. Excursion aux Pays des Alpes. Gratz n.d. [ca. 1884]

Articles in the Ischler Wochenblatt are listed by V. Sigusch (2003, p. 125).

== Secondary literature ==
- Ehle, Evelyn (2008). Unmoral, Krankheit oder Naturphänomen? Homosexualitätskonzepte im wissenschaftlichen Sexualitätsdiskurs zwischen 1830 und 1915. GRIN Verlag. p. 24. ISBN 978-3-638-91622-6.
- Foucault, Michel; Valerio Marchetti; Antonella Salomoni; Arnold Ira Davidson; Graham Burchell (2003). Abnormal : lectures at the Collège de France, 1974-1975. Verso. p. 374. ISBN 978-1-85984-539-4. see pp 233–234 which is not merely passing mention, Kaan's work is identified as "the first text". Kaan is mentioned at some 15 other occasions in that book
- Gutmann, Philipp (1998). Zur Reifizierung des Sexuellen im 19. Jahrhundert: der Beginn einer Scientia sexualis, dargestellt anhand dreier Texte von Hermann Joseph Löwenstein, Joseph Häussler und Heinrich Kaan. Peter Lang. ISBN 978-3-631-33686-1. Note: this is a 1998 doctoral thesis that provides a historical perspective of the work of three nineteenth-century authors on sexuality (Hermann Joseph Löwenstein, 1823, Joseph Häussler, 1826, and Heinrich Kaan, 1844). The thesis provides the first full translation of the works of Lowenstein and Kaan from Latin into German - a great service as "Kaan's often quoted book" is linguistically inaccessible to many. (Text from book review in Hauser 2000:143)
- Hauser, Renate (2000). "Book Reviews - Zur Reifizierung des Sexuellen im 19. Jahrhundert. Der Beginn einer Scientia sexualis, dargestellt anhand dreier Texte von Hermann Joseph Lowenstein, Joseph Haussler und Heinrich Kaan". Medical History. 44 (1): 143. doi:10.1017/S0025727300066321.
- Largier, Niklaus; Graham Harman (2007). In praise of the whip: a cultural history of arousal. Zone Books. p. 526. ISBN 978-1-890951-65-8. only snippet views, but Kaan's work appears to be discussed over pages 435-437, and there is a verbatim quote on p 437.
- Leibbrand-Wettley, Annemarie (1971). Medizin und "sexualwissenschaft". Bayerische Landesärztekammer (Bayerische Akademie für Arbeitsmedizin und Soziale Medizin). Kaan's work is discussed in this book.
- Leibbrand-Wettley, Annemarie; Werner Leibbrand (1972). Formen des Eros: Kultur- und Geistesgeschichte der Liebe. K. Alber. ISBN 978-3-495-47256-9.
- Money, John; Margaret Lamacz (1989). Vandalized lovemaps: paraphilic outcome of seven cases in pediatric sexology. Prometheus Books. ISBN 978-0-87975-513-3.
- Sigusch, Volkmar (2002). "Richard von Krafft-Ebing. I.Krafft-Ebing zwischen Kaan und Freud. II.Bericht über den Nachlass und Genogramm". Z Sexualforsch. 15 (4): 211–247 und 341–354. doi:10.1055/s-2002-36631. (ref 29 in this publication)
- Sigusch, Volkmar (2008). Geschichte der Sexualwissenschaft. Campus Verlag. pp. 166–174. ISBN 978-3-593-38575-4.
- Weber, Philippe (2008). Der Trieb zum erzählen: Sexualpathologie und Homosexualität, 1852-1914. Transcript Verlag. p. 378. ISBN 978-3-8376-1019-2. see pp 51–52, p51, a scholar Tardieu is quoted for questioning (the topic is masturbation, homosexuality, etc.) if "these [sexual] vices have other causes than plain spoiled moral or if it is some sort of sexual psychopathy, a term in which he is indebted to Kaan" (own translation from German). In footnote 40 Kaan work was referred to analysis by Foucault in his discouse analysis on abnormality, on p 84 Kaan work is compared with Krafft-Ebing's
- Weiß, Volker (5 November 2007). Eine weibliche Seele im männlichen Körper. Archäologie einer Metapher als Kritik der medizinischen Konstruktion der Transsexualität (Dr. Phil. dissertation). FB Politik- und Sozialwissenschaften, Freie Universität Berlin.
- Wettley, Annemarie; Werner Leibbrand (1959). Von der "Psychopathia sexualis" zur Sexualwissenschaft. Stuttgart: Enke. Kaan's work is discussed in this book. (note: Annemarie Wettley later married Werner Leibbrand (both are medical historians) and she changed her name to Annemarie Leibbrand-Wettley)
