= László Gyimesi =

László Gyimesi may refer to:

- László Gyimesi, Hungarian pianist
- László Gyimesi, Hungarian former footballer
