= School of Art and Design (Łódź) =

Coordinates: 51°45′23″N 19°28′23″E

Academy of Art and Design in Lodz
- Wyższa Szkoła Sztuki i Projektowania w Łodzi
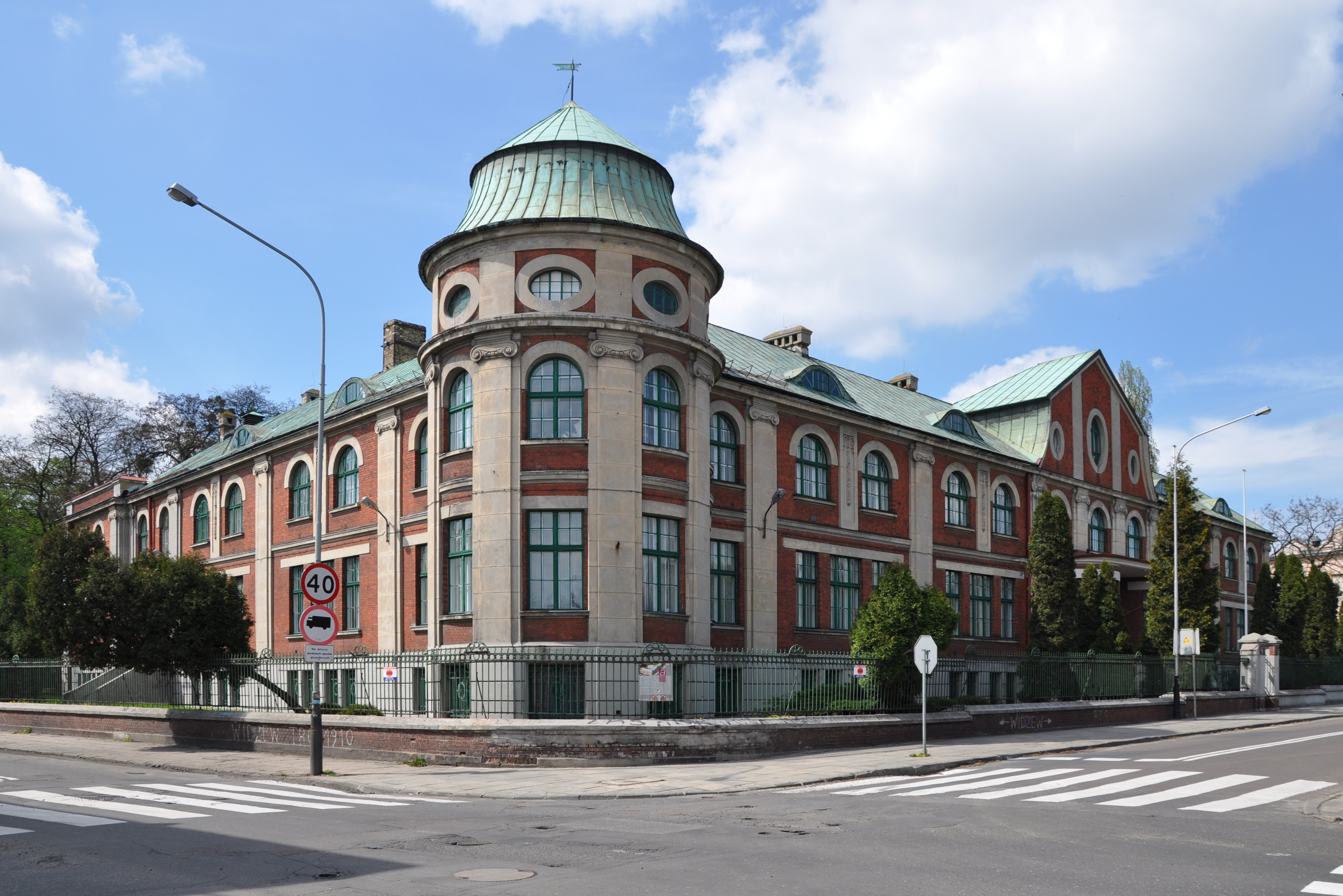
- Main building of the Academy in 2010
- Other names: WSSiP
- Type: Private art school
- Established: 1998; 28 years ago
- Location: ul. Targowa 65, 90-993 Łódź, Poland
- Campus: Urban

The Academy of Film, Art and Design (Polish: Wyższa Szkoła Sztuki i Projektowania) is a private arts university in Łódź, Poland. The current rector is prof. Piotr Cieciura.

The Academy of Film, Art and Design in Lodz (AFAD) - a non-state higher education institution in Lodz.

The Academy of Film, Art and Design in Lodz was established in April 1998 (by decision of the Minister of National Education, reg. number 139). From 1999 to 2004 the college was located at 163/165 Pomorska Street in Lodz. Since 2001 it has been offering courses at bachelor's and master's levels.

In April 2004, the university moved its headquarters to the Karol Scheibler's 19th century Commercial Center. The Academy of Film, Art and Design provides bachelor's (BA) and masters (MA) degrees, as well as unified 5 year masters degrees (for Filmmaking and Photography). It is one of three higher education film schools in Poland issuing a graduation diploma with a Master of Arts degree. The school's building houses a cinema hall named after Henryk Kluba, long-time rector of the Lodz Film School and lecturer at the Film and Photography Department of AFAD.

Famous alumni

Małgorzata Gryniewicz (Directing), Kamil Młyńczyk (Photography), Maciej Łazowski (Design), Ewelina Żurawska (Design), Lana Nguyen (Design), Agata Całka (Design), Stanisław Całka (Design), Mikołaj Gospodarek (Photography), Sabrina Pilewicz (Design), Rafał Zieliński (Design), Katarzyna Ostapowicz (Design), Maciej Blaźniak (Design), Karolina Mabiki (Architecture), Julita Pasikowska (Film), Ewelina Mikulska-Ignaczak (Architecture), Konrad Laprus (Architecture), Tomasz Miłosz (Design)
