= Stefan Askenase =

Polish-Belgian classical pianist (1896–1985)

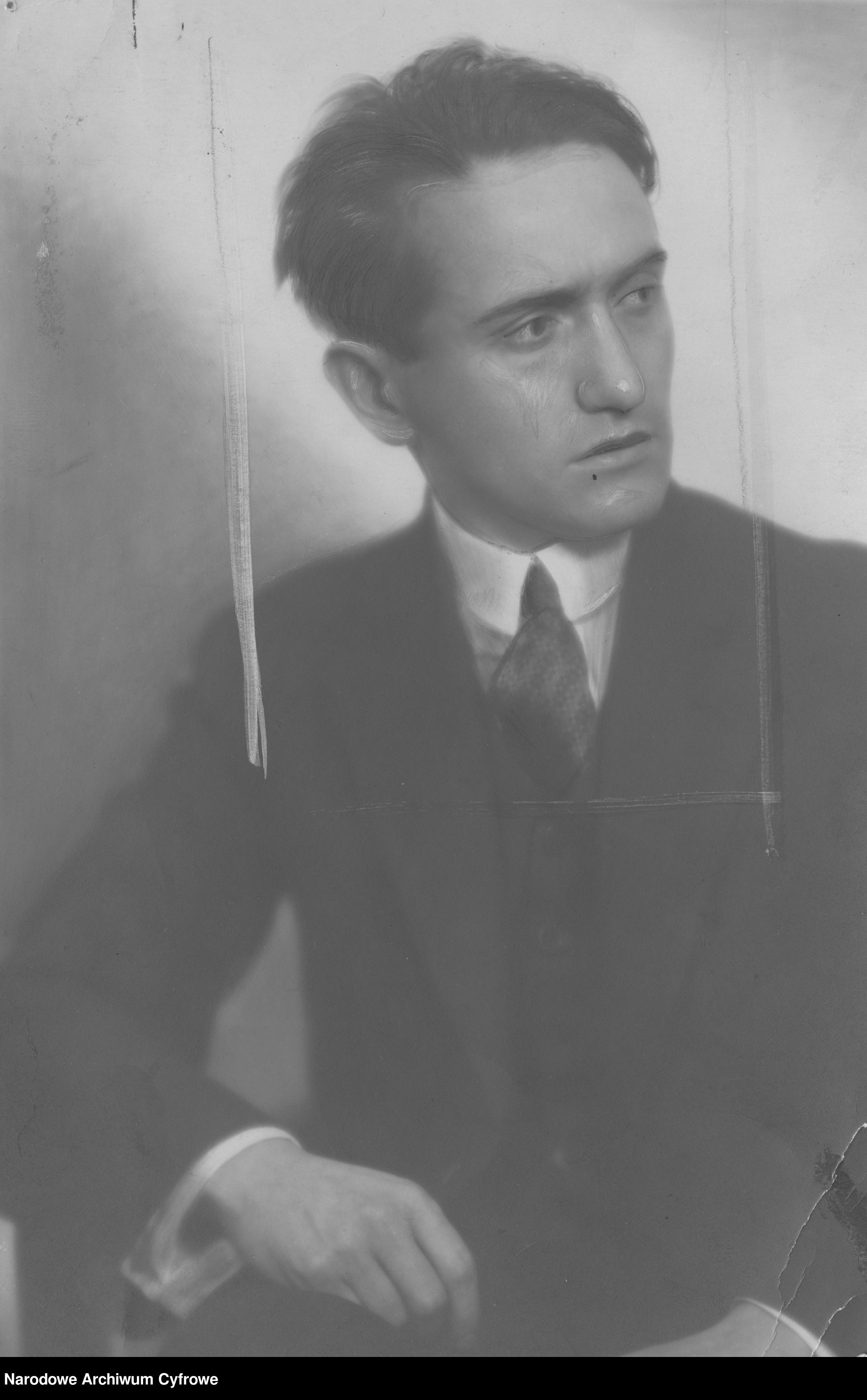
- Born: 10 July 1896; Lemberg, Austria-Hungary
- Died: 18 October 1985 (aged 89); Bonn, West Germany
- Occupation: pianist

External image
- Stefan Askenase

Stefan Askenase (10 July 1896 – 18 October 1985) was a Polish-Belgian classical pianist and pedagogue.

== Biography ==
Askenase was born in Lemberg (now Lviv, Ukraine) to a Polish-Jewish family.

At the age of five he began playing the piano with his mother, a pianist and pupil of Karol Mikuli. He studied with Theodor Pollak, a professor and director of the Ludwik Marek School of Music in Lemberg, then with Emil von Sauer, a pupil of Liszt, at the Vienna Academy of Music.

During World War I he served in the Austro-Hungarian army.

In 1919 he made his debut in Vienna, and subsequently toured throughout the world. He lived in Cairo and then Rotterdam, where he taught at the Conservatory of Music from 1937 to 1940.

During the Second World War he hid in France.

Askenase's first concert in Poland after World War II took place on 17 May 1946. In 1950 he became a naturalized Belgian citizen and from 1954 to 1961 he taught at the Brussels Conservatory of Music.

He recorded extensively the works of Chopin for the Deutsche Grammophon label in the 1950s and 1960s.

Stefan Askenase was also noted for his master-classes in Hamburg, Cologne and Jerusalem.

In 1965 he founded The Arts and Music Society, whose aim was to preserve the historical Rolandseck railway station upon the river Rhine near Remagen, Germany. After its restoration the building became a venue for artists such as Pierre Fournier, Hans Arp, Oskar Kokoschka, Yehudi Menuhin, Martin Walser, Marcel Marceau, Henryk Szeryng, Salvador Dalí and Askenase himself.

His pupils included Martha Argerich, László Gyimesi, John McKay, André Tchaikowsky, Mitsuko Uchida, Naum Sluzsny and Mordehai Simoni.

Stefan Askenase died in Bonn on 18 October 1985, shortly after giving a concert in Cologne. His wife Anny died in 1969.

== Notable family members ==
- Stefan Askenase's father in-law was Benedykt Ziemilski (1892–1942)
- Stefan Askenase's uncle through marriage was Andrzej Ziemilski's (1923–2003)
