= Benedykt Ziemilski =

Polish physician and researcher who perish in the Holocaust

- Born: Baruch Zimmels; October 2, 1892; Ostrava
- Disappeared: 1942; Lublin Station
- Died: 1942 (aged 49–50); Majdanek
- Cause of death: Murder (Holocaust)
- Education: Medicine in Lviv, Munich, Vienna, and Prague
- Occupation: Physician/Medical Doctor
- Website: https://benedyktziemilski.com/

Benedykt Ziemilski (October 2, 1892 – 1942) was a Polish physician and researcher. He was the father of Polish sociologist, writer, journalist, and mountaineer Andrzej Ziemilski. He was murdered by Nazi Germany during the Holocaust in 1942 in the Majdanek concentration camp. His Jewish identity, and reason for his murder, were only discovered by his family in recent years.

In 2021, Ziemilski was honored by International March of the Living for his contributions to medicine during its program “Medicine and Morality: Lessons from the Holocaust”. The 2021 initiative recognized medical professionals who opposed the Nazis, as well as those who worked to combat the COVID-19 Pandemic.

== Early life ==
Ziemilski was born as Baruch Zimmels on October 2, 1892, in Ostrava. Until the end of World War I, his family were citizens of the Austro-Hungarian Empire. His father, Bernhard Zimmels, a rabbi in Ostrava, died 10 months after Baruch was born.

Ziemilski (still Baruch at that time) attended medical school at the University of Göttingen around 1912. He served as a military doctor in the Austro-Hungarian army and after, in Piłsudski's Legions, which won Poland's independence. Piłsudski was a notable inspiration to Ziemilski, and he became a member of the Polish Socialist Party PPS.

== 1918 to 1935 ==
In 1923, Ziemilski married Olga Askenaze, who was born in 1894 and was the daughter of a prominent public figure in the Lviv community. Her father held several important positions, including vice president of Lviv, president of the bar association, and chairman of the Jewish Community for a long time. Ziemilski and Olga had a son named Andrzej. It's has been noted that Ziemilski's brother-in-law was Stefan Askenase, a well-known pianist.

Zimmels graduated from medical school in 1921, and changed his name from Zimmels to Ziemilski, sounding more Polish than German. He also changed his Jewish first name from Baruch to his Christian and Polish name, Benedykt. Many Jews changed their names to avoid identification at that time. He became a prominent doctor in Lviv.

Ziemilski provided healthcare services to prisoners in one of the most significant prisons in Poland, which was situated in the Świętokrzyskie Mountains in a former monastery. He treated an inmate, a thief and informant named Sergiusz Piasecki, who handed him a manuscript for his book. Ziemilski sent the manuscript to publisher and writer Melchior Wańkowicz, ultimately leading to Piasecki's release. Lover of the Great Bear, a novel penned by the author during his time in prison, gained immense popularity in the Second Polish Republic after its publication in 1937. It ranked third among the most well-received novels of the era.

Ziemilski also conducted scientific research to find solutions for hypoglycemia and pulmonary diseases, particularly tuberculosis. His work caught the attention of the German pharmaceutical company Bayer.

During the interwar period in Poland, Dr. Ziemilski had the opportunity to meet with several renowned medical experts, among them Dr. Marek Reichenstein, a pioneering physician and lover of art. Despite the war, Reichenstein's extensive collections endured and are currently exhibited in several museums throughout Lviv. Ziemilski wrote the obituary for Dr. Reichenstein after his passing which was published in Polska Gazeta Lekarska (Nr. 12, 931 issue).

== The Holocaust ==
During the beginning of WWII, Ziemilski enlisted to defend Poland from the Germans invading from the west. At the same time, the Soviets were invading from the east and the town of Lviv was under Soviet occupation until 1941. Ziemilski held his practice and his son, Andrzej's school had changed from a Polish to a Ukrainian school.

By 1941, Lviv was occupied by the Germans. They had established a ghetto in Lviv and forced the Jews to live there, before deporting them for execution. Ziemilski, being a Jewish doctor was temporarily safe from the Nazi's due to his profession. The Germans required Ziemilski to register his medical profession as required by the German occupation of Lviv. Soon, with the threat of deportation to the camps, he and his family decided to attempt escape to Warsaw. Ziemilski separated from his family to give everyone a better chance of a clean getaway. In a different rail car, he was spotted by passenger, and arrested at Lublin station. He was taken to the death camps at Majdanek. Lublin station was the last time his family had seen him.

=== Correspondence From Ziemilski's Apartment ===
Ziemilski's wife and mother had moved near Warsaw using false identities. Sometime after Dr. Ziemilski's death, an individual brought them some mail from their old apartment. The mail from Lwów contained two official letters in German, one of which was from Majdanek notifying the family of Benedykt Ziemilski's death. The other letter was from a German drug company, which announced that Dr. Ziemilski would receive a financial settlement for an important component he had invented.

Eli Rubenstein, author of an article on Dr. Ziemilski and Director of Education for International March of the Living, pointed out the irony of the two letters: "In effect, one German letter recognizing his brilliance, the other German letter announcing his murder.” The article also mentions that Dr. Ziemilski's descendants thanked the March of the Living for "bringing to light his story”, after Ziemilski was honored by International March of the Living for his contributions to medicine in 2021.

“Hitler not only wanted to destroy the Jewish people but even the memory of the Jewish people and their many important contributions to humanity. Preserving the story of Dr. Ziemilski is one small but important way in which March of the Living even today is able to combat the evil of Nazi Germany's policies,” Rubenstein wrote.

== Recognition On The March Of The Living ==
In 2021, Ziemilski was honored by International March of the Living for his contributions to medicine during its program “Medicine and Morality: Lessons from the Holocaust”. The 2021 initiative recognized medical professionals who opposed the Nazis, as well as those who worked to combat the COVID-19 Pandemic. During the program, a candle was lit in honor of Dr. Benedykt Ziemilski by Dr. Allen Nager (Director, Division of Emergency and Transport Medicine and Professor of Clinical Pediatrics at the Keck School of Medicine of USC) who also authored a study on the impact of the March of the Living program on adolescents.

== Notable family members ==
- Father – Rabbi Bernhard Zimmels (died 1893)
- Son – Andrzej Ziemilski (1923–2003)
- Brother-in-law – Stefan Askenase (1896–1985)
- Daughter-in-law – Małgorzata Dzieduszycka-Ziemilska (born 1949)
- Grandchildren – Wojciech Ziemilski and Paweł Ziemilski

== See also ==
- United States Holocaust Memorial Museum
- Eli Rubenstein
