= Malgorzata Dobrowolska-Furdyna =

Polish–American physicist

- Born: Poland
- Spouse: Jacek Furdyna

Academic background
- Education: B.S., 1971, MS, 1972, University of Warsaw; PhD, 1979, Polish Academy of Sciences

Academic work
- Institutions: University of Notre Dame

Malgorzata "Margaret" Dobrowolska-Furdyna is a Polish–American physicist. As the associate dean for undergraduate studies in the College of Science at the University of Notre Dame, Dobrowolska-Furdyna has been elected a Fellow of the American Physical Society and American Association for the Advancement of Science.

== Early life and education ==
Dobrowolska-Furdyna completed her entire post-secondary education in her homeland of Poland. She earned her Bachelor of Science and Master of Science degree at the University of Warsaw followed by her PhD at the Polish Academy of Sciences in 1979. Following her doctoral degree, Dobrowolska-Furdyna travelled to North American to work in Purdue University's condensed matter physics laboratory with her future husband Jacek Furdyna.

== Career ==
Upon completing her post-doctoral work at Purdue, Dobrowolska-Furdyna became an assistant professor in Poland for two years before returning to the United States to marry Furdyna. They both accepted faculty positions at the University of Notre Dame in 1987 where Dobrowolska-Furdyna began her research on optical properties of man-made magnetic semiconductors. As a Full professor of physics in 2005, Dobrowolska-Furdyna continued to specialize in magnetospectroscopy of semiconductor heterostructures and was elected a Fellow of the American Physical Society. Following her election, she was also one of three College of Science faculty selected to receive the 2008 Rev. Edmund P. Joyce, C.S.C., Award for Excellence in Undergraduate Teaching.

Two years later, Dobrowolska-Furdyna was appointed the Rev. John Cardinal O’Hara, C.S.C. Professor of Physics for a five-year term. Following her first year in this position, she was elected a Fellow of the American Association for the Advancement of Science for her "seminal experimental studies of semiconductor materials and tireless contributions to undergraduate education and outreach to local communities on energy conservation." In 2012, Dobrowolska-Furdyna's research led her to collaborate with scientists from the University of British Columbia and Lawrence Berkeley National Laboratory to identify the mechanisms responsible for ferromagnetism in the semiconductor GaMnAs. Following this discovery, she received another Joyce Award and was appointed to the position of associate dean for undergraduate studies in the College of Science.

As an associate dean, Dobrowolska-Furdyna organized an annual tennis tournament to raise funds for science programs in local South Bend, Indiana schools. Prior to the appointment of Amy Coney Barrett to the Supreme Court of the United States in 2020, Dobrowolska-Furdyna was one of nearly 200 members of Notre Dame's faculty to sign letters opposing her nomination.
