= Małgosia =

Małgosia is a Polish feminine given name. It is a diminutive of the name Małgorzata. Notable people with the name include:

- Małgosia Bela (born 1977), Polish model and actress
- Malgosia Fitzmaurice (born 1955), Polish lawyer
- Małgosia Piekarska (born 1954), Polish actress
- Małgosia Tomassi, Polish model and actress
