= John McKay (pianist) =

American pianist and music educator

John McKay (born November 11, 1938) is an American pianist and music educator of Canadian birth. He has performed in concerts, recitals, and on radio and television broadcasts throughout North America and Europe. His programs often include works by contemporary American and Canadian composers, and he has performed the world premieres of works by Mortimer Barron, Clermont Pépin and Harry Somers among other composers. He has also performed extensively as a chamber musician and accompanist, including in performances with his wife, contralto Sara Hayden. In 1989, he co-founded the Minnesota Valley Sommarfest.

== Life and career ==
Born in Montreal, McKay studied the piano with Lubka Kolessa in his native city as a boy. He graduated from the Schulich School of Music at McGill University with a Bachelor of Music in 1961. In 1962, he won the Prix d'Europe which enabled him to pursue studies in Vienna and Cologne with Bruno Seidlhofer and in Brussels with Stefan Askenase. In 1969, he joined the music faculties of both the University of Toronto and The Royal Conservatory of Music. He taught concurrently at those institutions until 1972 when was appointed head of the piano department at Dalhousie University. In 1971, he co-founded NOVA MUSIC, a Halifax-based organization dedicated to presenting new or seldom-performed music.

In 1974 McKay immigrated to the United States to pursue graduate studies at the Eastman School of Music at the University of Rochester. He earned a Doctor of Musical Arts from the school in 1979 after completing a doctoral thesis on notational practices in piano works by 20th-century composers. While pursuing these studies, he began teaching on the music faculty at Gustavus Adolphus College in St. Peter, Minnesota in 1976, remaining there until 2004. He became a naturalized citizen of the United States in 1985.
