= Irene Tomaszewski =

Canadian writer, editor and translator

Irene Tomaszewski (also Irena Tomaszewska, born May 1940) is a Canadian writer, editor and translator of Polish descent living in Montreal, Canada.

== Early life ==
Irene Tomaszewski (Tomaszewska, in proper Polish usage, since she is female) was born in 1940 to Polish parents in the Soviet Union's Rosochy prison, in the Arkhangelsk Oblast gulag. In June 1941, after Germany attacked its former Soviet ally, the family was released from the gulag. In 1942, along with tens of thousands of other Poles, they were evacuated from the Soviet Union to the Near East. On their way south, Tomaszewski's mother Anna, pregnant with Irena, and her two sisters Wanda and Halina, were separated from the children's father, Felix. In 1949, after six years in an East Africa refugee camp, the family were reunited in England, and subsequently emigrated to Canada.

== Career ==
Tomaszewski was a founding president of the Canadian Foundation for Polish Studies. She co-authored, with Tecia Werbowski, Codename Żegota: Rescuing Jews in Occupied Poland, 1942-1945, on a clandestine organization that helped Jews in Poland.

Tomaszewski wrote the screenplay for the 1999 film based on the book, titled Żegota: The Council for Aid to Jews in Occupied Poland, 1942-45.

She translated the text and acted as editor for Inside a Gestapo Prison: The Letters of Krystyna Wituska, 1942-1944, published by Wayne State University Press in 2006. The Tomaszewski translation was published earlier in 1997 under the title, I Am First a Human Being: The Prison Letters of Krystyna Wituska. Books in Canada reviewed the work, noting that Tomaszewski first came across the letters while working on a documentary on Poland for the Canadian Broadcasting Corporation. The translation draws on the earlier Polish language book by Dr. Wanda Kiedrzynska and from others who knew or were related to Wituska. The book also contains an explanatory list of people mentioned in the correspondence.

She is the editor of the Cosmopolitan Review, the quarterly, English-language magazine on Polish affairs.

In 1999, Tomaszewski was invited to give the ninth Milewski Polish Studies Lecture at Central Connecticut State University on the topic of: "The Holocaust: Remembrance and Education". Professor Stanislaus Blejwas, in his introduction to the published address, called Tomaszewski one of the thoughtful voices in the discussion between Jews and Poles about the Holocaust.

In 2014, Tomaszewski was the keynote speaker at the opening of Toronto's presentation of an exhibit about Jan Karski, "The World Knew – Jan Karski’s Mission for Humanity".

Along with Polish writer, Małgorzata Dzieduszycka-Ziemilska, she was instrumental in encouraging contact and dialogue between Jewish students and Polish students during the annual March of the Living program.

== See also ==
- Holocaust in Poland
- Polish government in Exile
- Zofia Kossak-Szczucka
- Wanda Krahelska-Filipowicz
