= Malgorzata Marek-Sadowska =

Polish-American electronics engineer

Malgorzata ("Margaret") Marek-Sadowska is a Polish-American electronics engineer known for her research in VLSI circuit design. She is a professor emeritus of electrical and computer engineering at the University of California, Santa Barbara, a member of the university's Institute for Energy Efficiency, and the director of the VLSI CAD Lab at the university.

== Education ==
Marek-Sadowska attained a M.Sc. in Applied Mathematics and a Ph.D. in Electrical Engineering from Warsaw University of Technology.

== Career ==
Marek-Sadowska was an assistant professor at the Warsaw University of Technology from 1976 until 1982. In 1979, she began a visiting position at the University of California, Berkeley, continued at Berkeley as a researcher, and moved to Santa Barbara in 1990. She was editor-in-chief of IEEE Transactions on Computer-Aided Design of Integrated Circuits and Systems from 1993 to 1997, and in 1997, she was elected as a Fellow of the IEEE. She retired in 2017.
