= Małgorzata Dzieduszycka-Ziemilska =

Polish publicist, theater critic, diplomat

Consul General in Montreal
- In office 1992–1996
- Succeeded by: Dobromir Dziewulak

Personal details
- Born: 1 July 1949 (age 77) Kraków, Poland
- Spouse: Andrzej Ziemilski
- Children: Wojciech, Paweł
- Education: University of Wrocław

Małgorzata Maria Dzieduszycka-Ziemilska (born 1 June 1949) is a Polish publicist, theatre critic and served as the Consul General in Montreal from 1992 to 1996 and is also a permanent Delegate of the Republic of Poland to UNESCO

Dzieduszycka-Ziemils graduated from Polish Studies at the University of Wrocław. Her master's thesis was under the supervision of Professor Czesław Hernas, about Jerzy Grotowski's "Apocalypsis cum figuris." This thesis appeared in print and was the first book about Grotowski published in Poland.

Dzieduszycka-Ziemilska wrote in various publications (magazines) ITD, Kultura, Polityka and Dialog Magazine. In the 1980s, Dzieduszycka-Ziemilska was the head of the Kalambul Literary Theatre in Wrocław and the "Studio" Theater in Warsaw, and ran a foreign department at Teatr Magazine. She was the organizer of some international theatre festivals in Wrocław.

In 1990, she was appointed as an adviser to the Minister of Culture and became the representative of Poland in the Council of Europe's Culture Committee, as well as the general secretary of the Polish branch of the European Culture Foundation. In 1992, she was appointed Consul General in Montreal, where she held this position until autumn 1996.

She was the co-founder of the Polish-Canadian Committee for Dialogue, focusing on Polish-Jewish cooperation. From 2000 to 2003, she was a permanent representative of the Republic of Poland to UNESCO in Paris. Member of the Polish Committee for UNESCO.

She has two sons: Wojciech and Paweł with her late husband, Andrzej Ziemilski (1923–2003). The Dzieduszycka side of the family used to wear the coat of arms of Sas.

== Leading International World Heritage Site Visit in Poland ==
The World Heritage Committee is a committee of the United Nations Educational Scientific and Cultural Organization that selects the sites to be listed as UNESCO World Heritage Sites including the World Heritage List and the List of World Heritage in Danger. On July 1 & 2, 2001, Malgorzata Dzieduszycka received a delegation from the UN’s World Heritage Committee to lead the visit to the Auschwitz-Birkenau State Museum and related sites. The mission was taken on an inspection of the Auschwitz and Birkenau camps and the surrounding areas. The mission also met representatives of the local authorities of the city of Oswiecim, the governor and other local Polish representatives to discuss the management and planning of the camps, their surroundings and related sites. The mission came after the invitation from the Polish government and a passed resolution at an official meeting.

Following the visit, a report of the International World Heritage site visit was issued with several recommendations.

== Notable family members ==
- Father in-law: Benedykt Ziemilski (1892-1942)
- Husband: Andrzej Ziemilski

== Publications ==
- Tysiąc wiatrów w biegu (translation: Thousand winds on the run), Warszawa: Państwowy Instytut Wydawniczy, 2015.
- Idiomy angielskie: słownik (translation: English Idioms: Dictionary), Warszawa: Wiedza Powszechna, 2001, 2005, 2009.
- Ameryka z miłością i złością (translation: America with love and anger), Wrocław: Wydawnictwo Dolnośląskie, 1989.
- Apocalypsis cum figuris: opis spektaklu Jerzego Grotowskiego (translation: Apocalypsis cum figuris: description of the performance directed by Jerzy Grotowski), Kraków: Wydawnictwo Literackie, 1974.
- Witness: Passing the Torch of Holocaust Memory to New Generations: Second Story Press. Małgorzata Dzieduszycka-Ziemilska co-translated the original edition in 2015 to Polish with Canadian writer, Irene Tomaszewski. The book was compiled by Eli Rubenstein.

== Bibliography ==
- Tadeusz Kosobudzki: MSZ od A do Z. Ludzie i sprawy Ministerstwa Spraw zagranicznych w latach 1990–1995. Warszawa: Wydawnictwo'69, 1997, pp. 97–98. ISBN 83-86244-09-7.
