= Ezras Israel Synagogue =

Destroyed synagogue in Łódź, Poland

Ezras Izrael Synagogue
- Polish: Synagoga Ezras Izrael
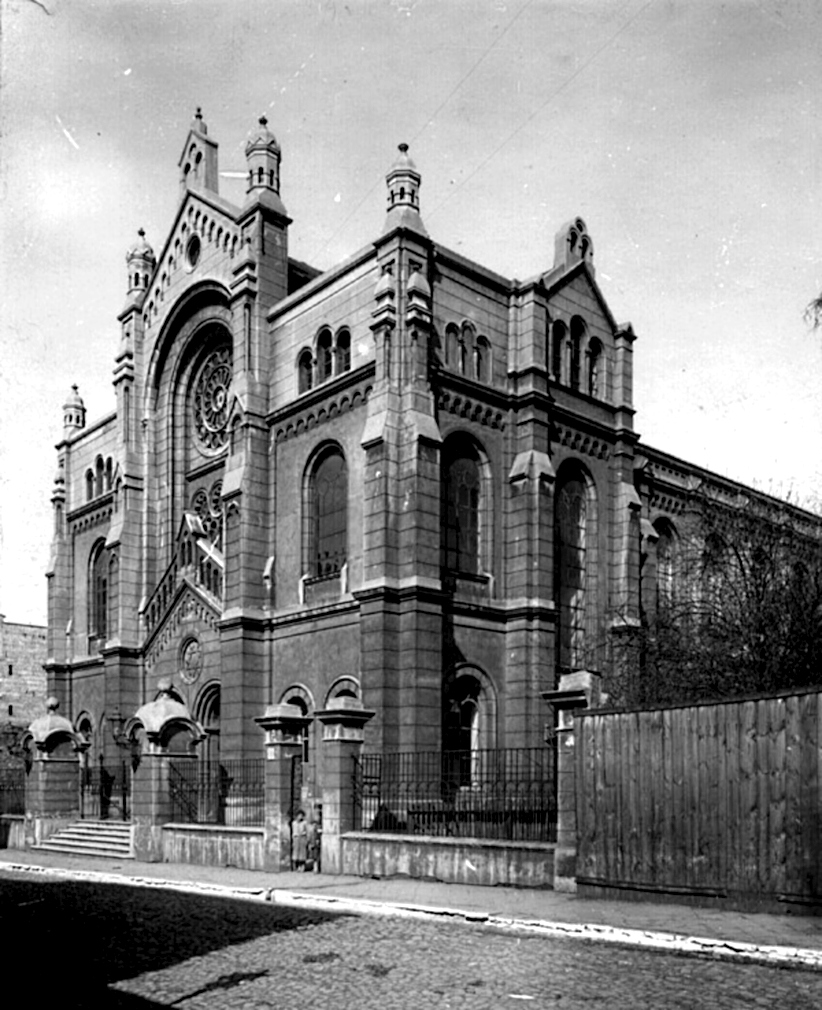
- The former synagogue, between 1910 and 1920

- Location of the destroyed synagogue in Łódź Voivodeship

Religion
- Affiliation: Orthodox Judaism (former)
- Ecclesiastical or organizational status: Synagogue (1904–1939)
- Status: Destroyed

Location
- Location: ul. Wólczańska 6 Street, Łódź, Łódź Voivodeship
- Country: Poland
- Interactive map of Ezras Izrael Synagogue
- Coordinates: 51°46′23″N 19°27′04″E

Architecture
- Architect: Gustaw Landau-Gutenteger
- Type: Synagogue architecture
- Groundbreaking: 1899
- Completed: 1904
- Destroyed: November 1939
- Materials: Bricks

The Ezras Izrael Synagogue (Polish: Synagoga Ezras Izrael), also known as Wołyńska Shul, was a former Orthodox Jewish congregation and synagogue or shul, located at ul. Wólczańska 6 Street, in Łódź, in the Łódź Voivodeship of Poland. Designed by Gustaw Landau-Gutenteger and completed in 1904, the synagogue served as a house of prayer until World War II when it was destroyed by Nazis in November 1939.

== History ==
The synagogue was built between 1899 and 1904 from donations by the Jewish merchants including those expelled from Tsarist Lithuania and Belarus area. The synagogue flourished for thirty years before it was burned to the ground by the Nazis on November 11, 1939 before the Łódź Ghetto was established.

Other synagogues destroyed by the Nazis in Łódź included the Great Synagogue, on November 14, 1939, and the Stara Synagogue, on November 15–16, 1939.

== Gallery ==
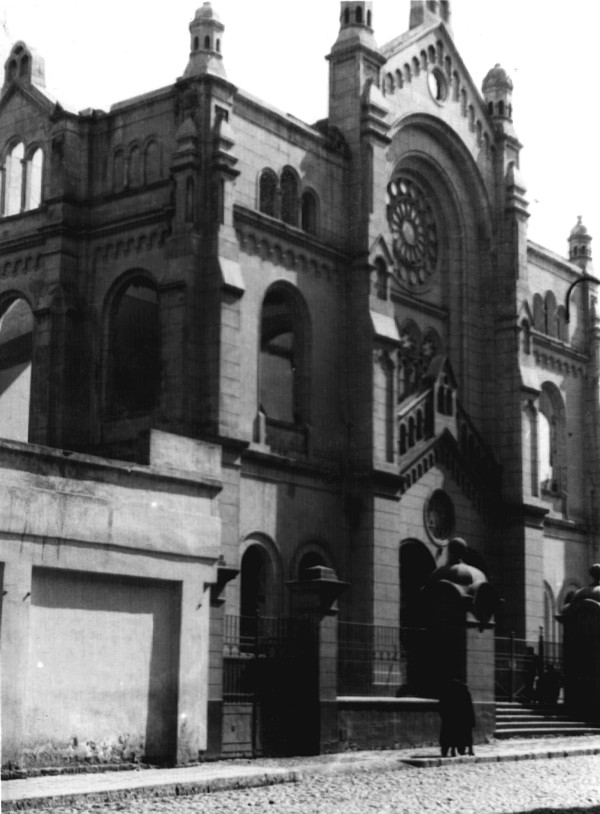
Synagogue before destruction

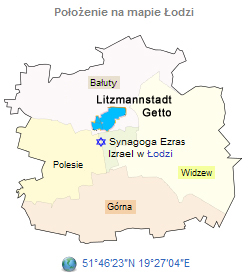
Location of the synagogue in relation to the Łódź Ghetto (blue)

== See also ==
- History of the Jews in Poland
- List of active synagogues in Poland
