= Małgorzata Peszyńska =

Polish and American applied mathematician

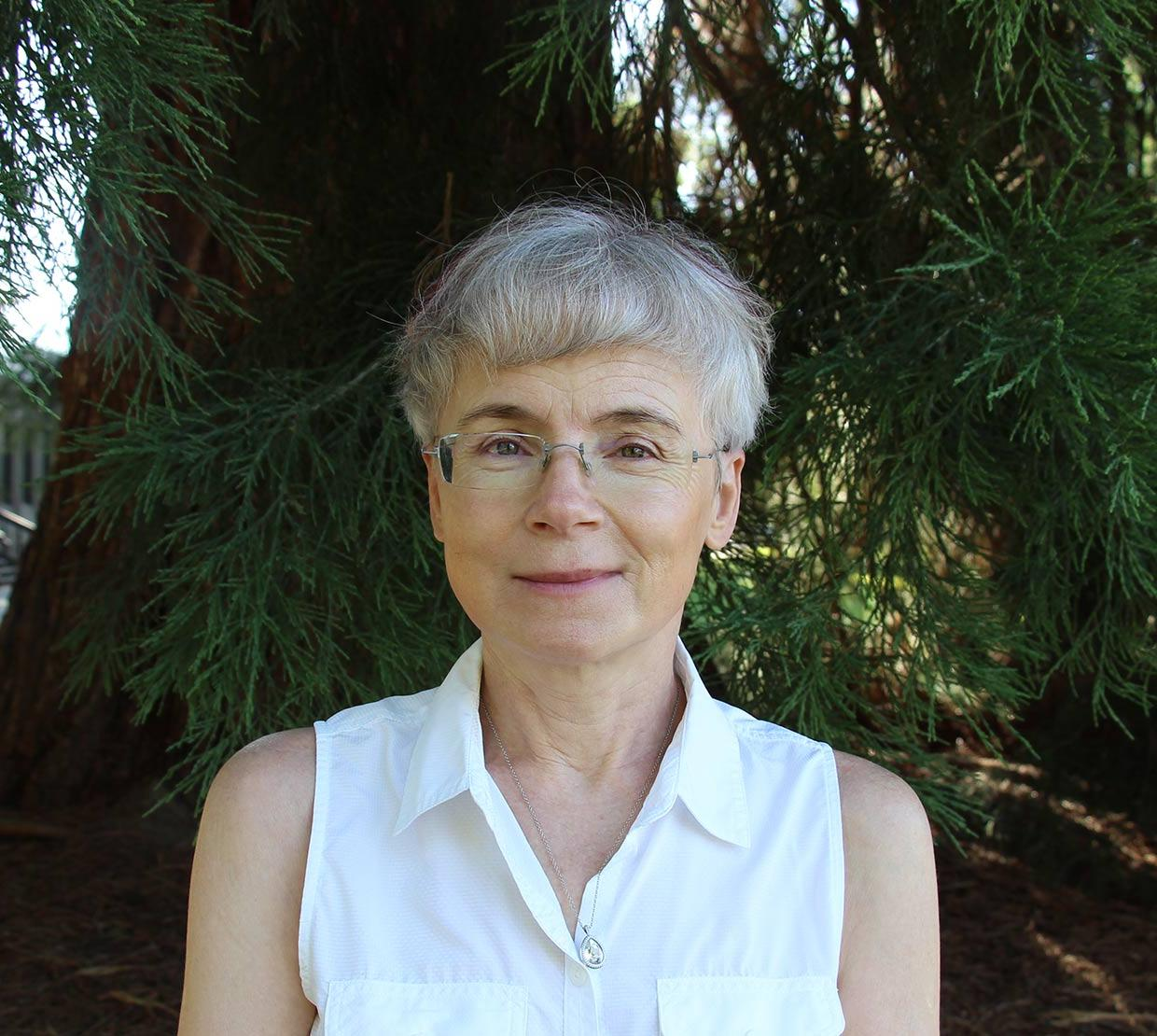
Peszyńska in 2020

Małgorzata Peszyńska (born August 28, 1962) is a Polish and American applied mathematician specializing in the mathematical modeling and computational solution of flows through porous media and their geological applications, including the effects of global warming on methane locked in permafrost. She is a professor of mathematics at Oregon State University.

== Education and career ==
Peszyńska is originally from Warsaw, and holds dual US and Polish citizenship. After attending a special high school program for students talented in mathematics, she earned a master's degree at the Warsaw University of Technology in 1986, studying a combination of mathematical logic and theoretical computer science. She became a researcher for the Systems Research Institute of the Polish Academy of Sciences while working towards a Ph.D. at the University of Augsburg in Germany, where her interests turned to applied mathematics. She completed the Ph.D. in 1992. Her doctoral dissertation, Flow through Fissured Media: Mathematical Analysis and Numerical Approach, was supervised by Karl-Heinz Hoffmann.

Keeping her research position at the Polish Academy of Sciences, she returned to the Warsaw University of Technology as an assistant professor in 1993. She visited Purdue University in the US in 1993–1995, and in 1995 moved to the US as a lecturer at the University of Texas at Austin, becoming a researcher at the university's Center for Subsurface Modeling in the Institute for Computational Engineering and Sciences in 1998. She took her present position at Oregon State University in 2003, beginning as an assistant professor, and was promoted to associate professor in 2006 and full professor in 2012. She began working as a program director at the National Science Foundation in 2019.

While at Oregon State, she returned to Poland in 2009–2010 as a Fulbright Scholar at the University of Warsaw, and completed a habilitation through the Warsaw University of Technology in 2011.

== Recognition ==
In 2020, Peszyńska was named a Fellow of the American Association for the Advancement of Science, "for outstanding contributions to multidisciplinary mathematical and computational modeling of flow and transport in porous media". She is the 2021 recipient of the SIAM Activity Group on Geosciences Career Prize.
