= Małgorzata Niezabitowska =

Polish journalist and politician

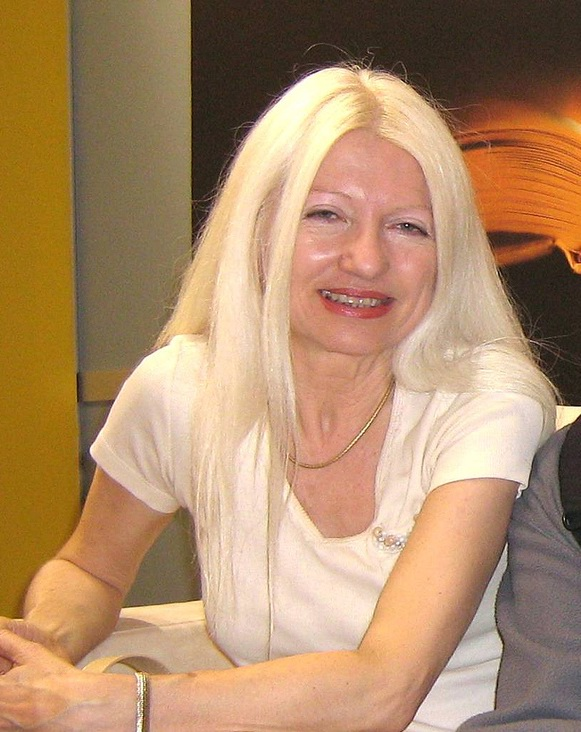
Małgorzata Niezabitowska

Małgorzata Niezabitowska (born 1948 in Warsaw) is a Polish journalist and politician. From 1989 to 1990 she served as a spokesperson for Prime Minister Tadeusz Mazowiecki's cabinet. She is married to Tomasz Tomaszewski, a National Geographic photographer.
