= Małgorzata Rozumecka =

Polish criminal (born 1975)

- Born: 1975 (age 50–51)
- Occupations: Criminal, student
- Years active: 1997
- Criminal charges: Murder
- Criminal penalty: Life imprisonment

Małgorzata Rozumecka (born 1975), nicknamed the Queen of Crime (Polish: królowa zbrodni), the Angel of Death (Polish: anioł śmierci), and Bloody Małgorzata (Polish: krwawa Małgorzata) by the press, is a Polish criminal who was involved in the murders of two people in 1997. She was sentenced to life imprisonment.

== Biography ==
Rozumecka was a student studying resocialization sciences. She grew up in a "normal" home and her parents were hardworking. She was "fascinated by money" and interacted with gangsters quite frequently, since they were not afraid to show off their wealth. The gangster Jarosław Sokołowski testified at Rozumecka's trial: "She was strange, she loved the gangster world, she hung around with us. Once she wanted to give me a dozen thousand złoty for killing some man who was supposedly after her head. I spat on her and left. That was the end of my acquaintance with Rozumecka."

In the spring of 1995, Rozumecka and her friend Anna went with the gangster Ryszard "Krzyś" Pawlik, a high-ranking member of the Pruszków mafia, to the club Kaskada. According to Rozumecka, Pawlik ordered Anna to take her clothes off and raped her in a back room. He then tried to rape Rozumecka, but she was able to escape before he was able to do so. Pawlik was arrested and Rozumecka and Anna obtained police protection, but both of them eventually recanted their statements. Rozumecka initially claimed that Pawlik raped Anna, but then said that Anna had consensual sex with Pawlik. The prosecutor's office warned Rozumecka's parents to get her under control, or else she may end up getting arrested in the future.

== Murders ==
Rozumecka lured her victims, Era GSM representatives Piotr Aniołkiewicz and Paweł Sulikowski, to a forest in the village of Komorów on the pretext of buying 32 mobile phones. She posed as a representative of a nonexistent film society dedicated to the actor Bogusław Linda, and said that the society required 32 phones, which would cost 50,000zł in total. Motivated by the prospect of a high commission, Aniołkiewicz and Sulikowski set out with cartons of phones to what they thought was Linda's villa, but was really a forest. Rozumecka had previously held a job at Era GSM, and had worked with Aniołkiewicz. Waiting in the forest along with Rozumecka was her younger brother Paweł Rozumecki, along with Marcin Tomczak. She got Paweł involved after she learnt that two representatives were coming and not one like she originally thought. In a forest clearing, Aniołkiewicz and Sulikowski were shot and their bodies were thrown into a pit that was dug beforehand.

Prior to the murders, she had arranged a deal with a merchant at the market in front of the Palace of Culture and Science in Warsaw, to whom she sold the stolen phones for 36,000zł.

== Trial ==
In 1999, Rozumecka was convicted of murder and was sentenced to life imprisonment. During her trial, Rozumecka refused to answer any questions, saying that she did not want to participate or even listen to the trial at all. She denied that she was trying to protect Paweł by staying quiet. She also tried to leave the courtroom, but was stopped by a policeman.

Rozumecka's brother Paweł left Poland with his mother and fled to Mexico to avoid impending arrest. In March 2006, Paweł was detained in the United States and was extradited back to Poland. On 13 November 2008, Rozumecki's sentence was annulled and the Court of Appeal announced that he will have a completely new trial, due to what the presiding judge, Barbara Skoczkowska, called in her judgement a "[gross violation of] the law" by the district court that had initially sentenced him. He was resentenced to 15 years in prison in 2009.

== Imprisonment ==
=== Escape attempt ===
Rozumecka had tried to escape from a psychiatric hospital in Tworki, where her mental state was being evaluated, with the assistance of her father. He was waiting underneath the hospital with a fake passport for her, a Mexican visa, a plane ticket. She was caught when she ran to his car. Her father was sentenced to a year in prison for assisting her, after which he died of a severe heart attack.

=== Possible parole ===
In a 2024 interview, Rozumecka said that she was trying for the past 2 years to get parole. She added that she hoped to go to the Netherlands after her release, since there is "greater anonymity" there in her opinion.

== In culture ==
=== Television ===
- An interview with Rozumecka was the focus of an episode of Cela nr, a documentary series aired by TVN about the lives of inmates in Polish prisons.

=== Books ===
- Monika Sławecka wrote a book about Rozumecka in 2017 titled Dożywocie. Zbrodnia i kara Małgorzaty Rozumeckiej.
