= Great Synagogue (Łódź) =

Destroyed Reform Jewish synagogue in Łódź, Poland

- Polish: Wielka Synagoga w Łodzi
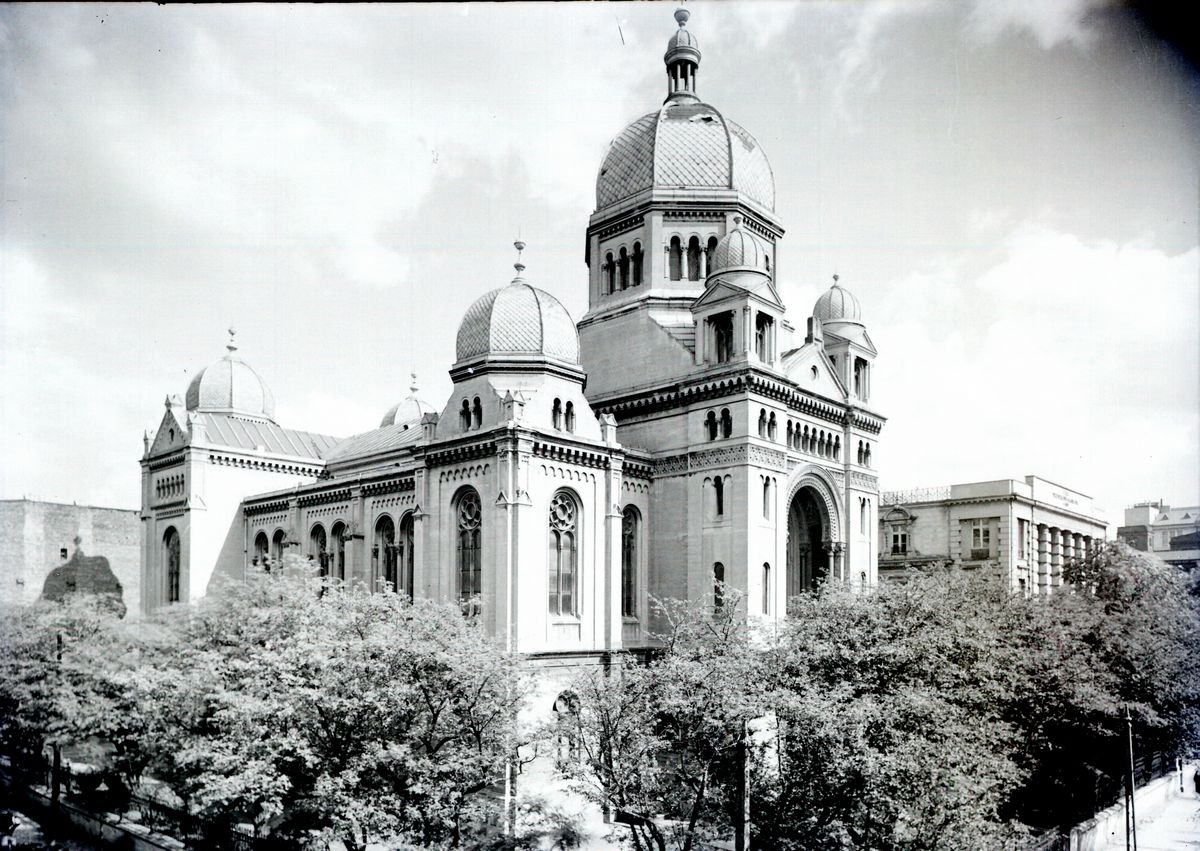
- Photograph of the former synagogue, 1930s

- Location of the destroyed synagogue in Łódź Voivodeship

Religion
- Affiliation: Reform Judaism (former)
- Ecclesiastical or organizational status: Synagogue (1887–1939)
- Status: Destroyed

Location
- Location: Łódź, Łódź Voivodeship
- Country: Poland
- Interactive map of Great Synagogue
- Coordinates: 51°46′12″N 19°27′14″E

Architecture
- Architect: Adolf Wolff
- Type: Synagogue architecture
- Style: Romanesque Revival
- Funded by: Izrael Poznański; Joachim Silberstein; Karol Scheibler
- General contractor: Johann Steck
- Groundbreaking: 1881
- Completed: 1887
- Destroyed: November 14, 1939

Specifications
- Dome: Four
- Materials: Bricks

The Great Synagogue of Łódź (Polish: Wielka Synagoga w Łodzi) was a former Reform Jewish congregation and synagogue, located in Łódź, in the Łódź Voivodeship of Poland. Designed by Adolf Wolff in the Romanesque Revival style and completed in 1887, the synagogue served as a house of prayer until World War II when it was destroyed by Nazis on November 14, 1939.

== History ==
The synagogue was commonly referred to as The Temple.

Prominent Łódż builder and architect Johann Steck (or Jan Sztek, 1851–1914) carried out construction of the synagogue between 1881 and 1887, at the corner of ul. Zielona and al. Tadeusza Kościuszki (formerly ul. Spacerowa). The construction was funded principally by local industrialists, including Izrael Poznański, Joachim Silberstein and Karol Scheibler.

The synagogue was burned to the ground by the Nazis on the night of November 14, 1939, along with its Torah scrolls and interior fixtures. The building was dismantled in 1940 and the site was subsequently used as a parking lot. A fragment of railing from the synagogue is on display in the Holocaust gallery of the Imperial War Museum in London.

Other synagogues destroyed by the Nazis in Łódź included the Stara Synagogue, on November 15–16, 1939, and the Ezras Izrael Synagogue, also in November 1939. Scorched walls were demolished in March 1940.

== Gallery ==
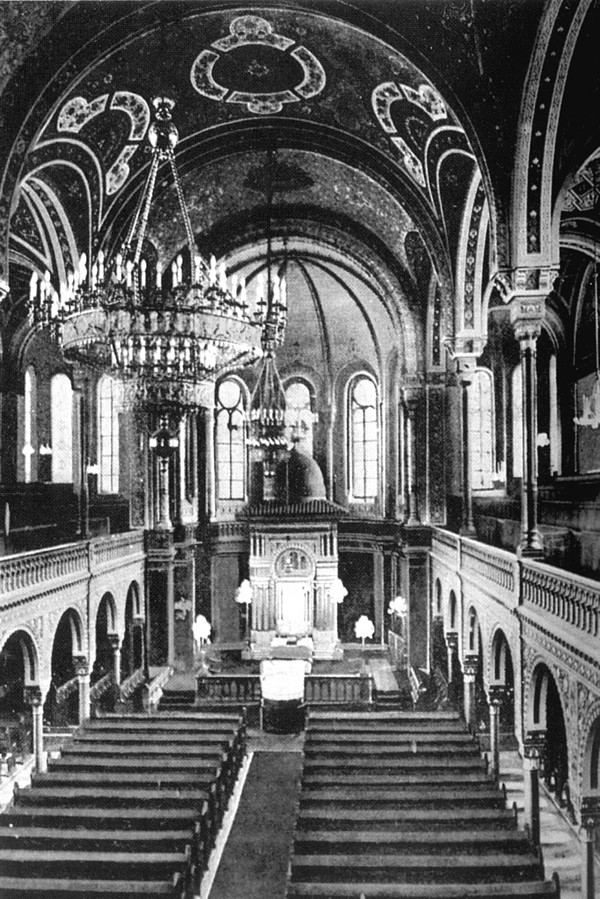
Synagogue interior

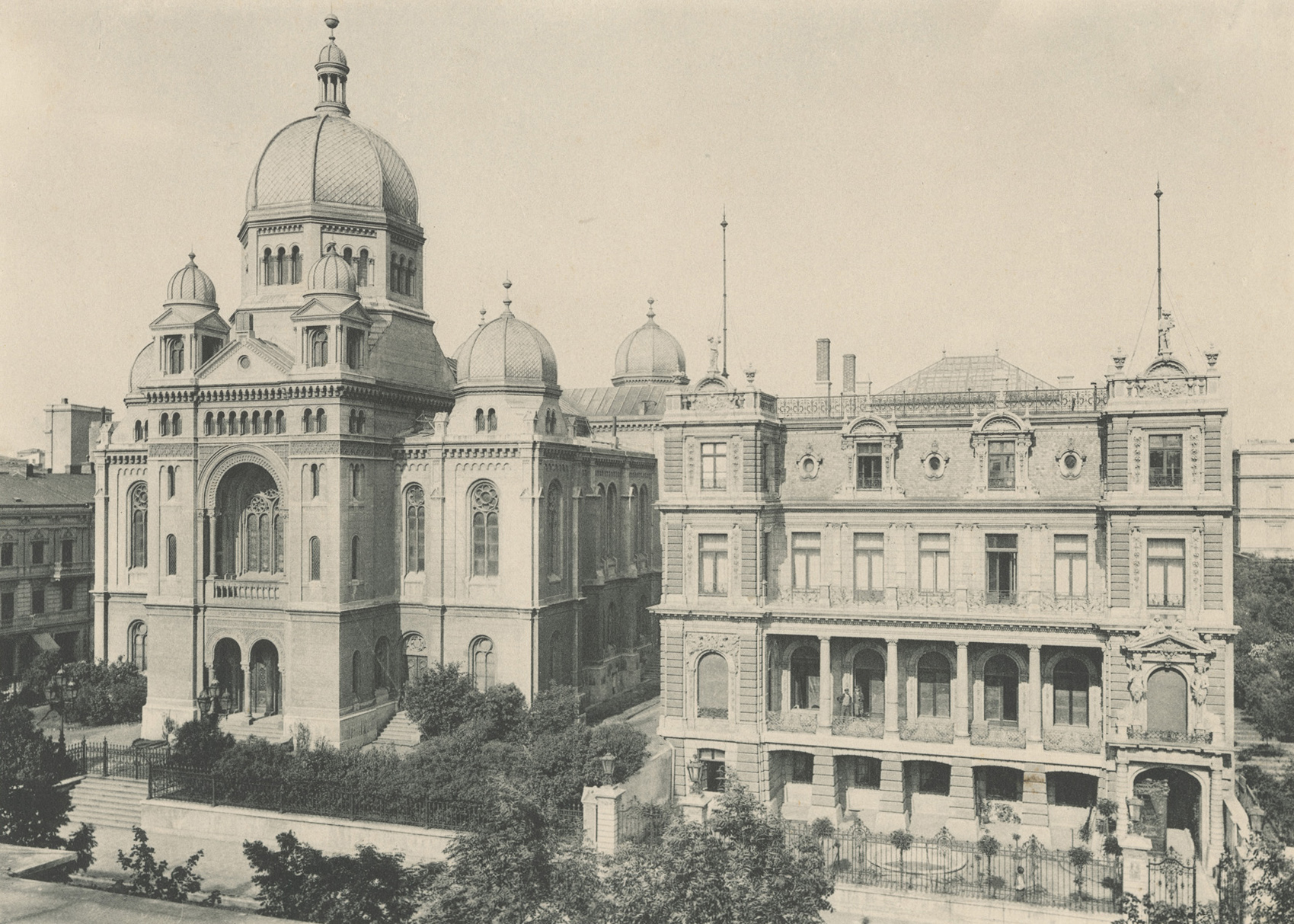

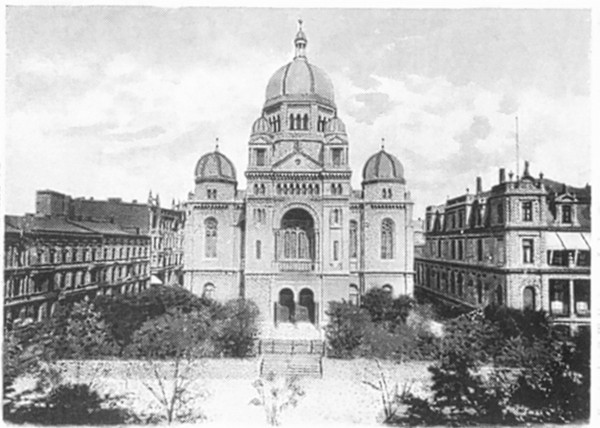

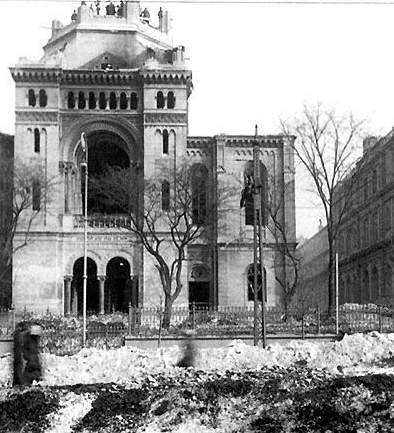
The former synagogue in 1939

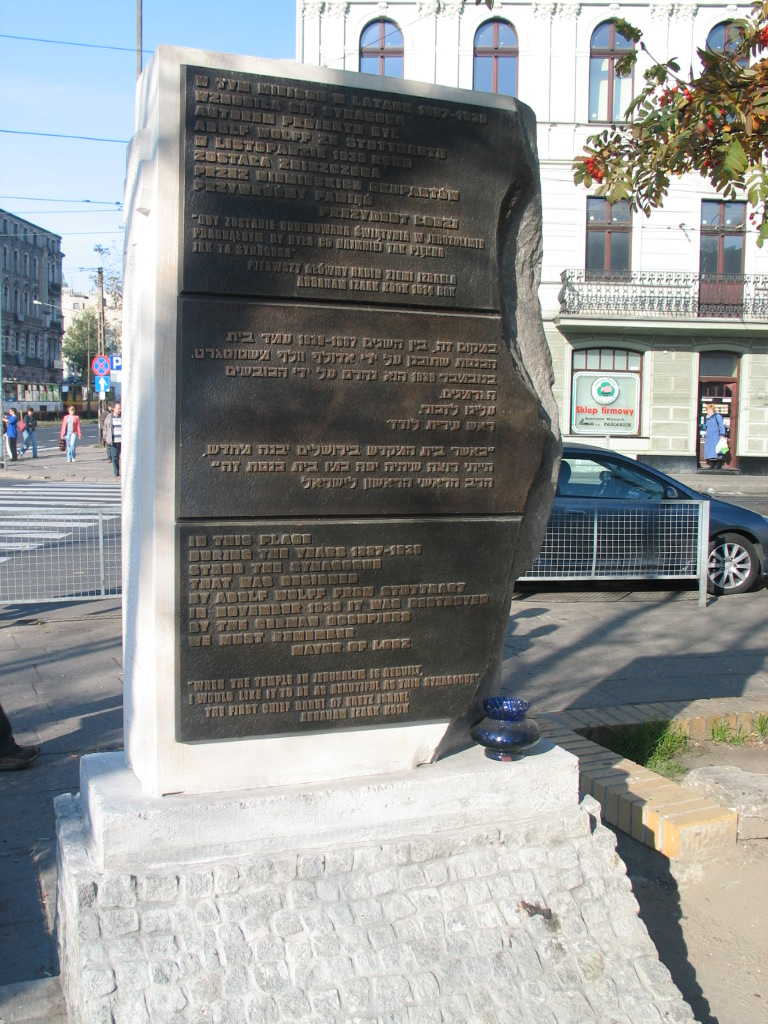
Commemoration stone on the former site

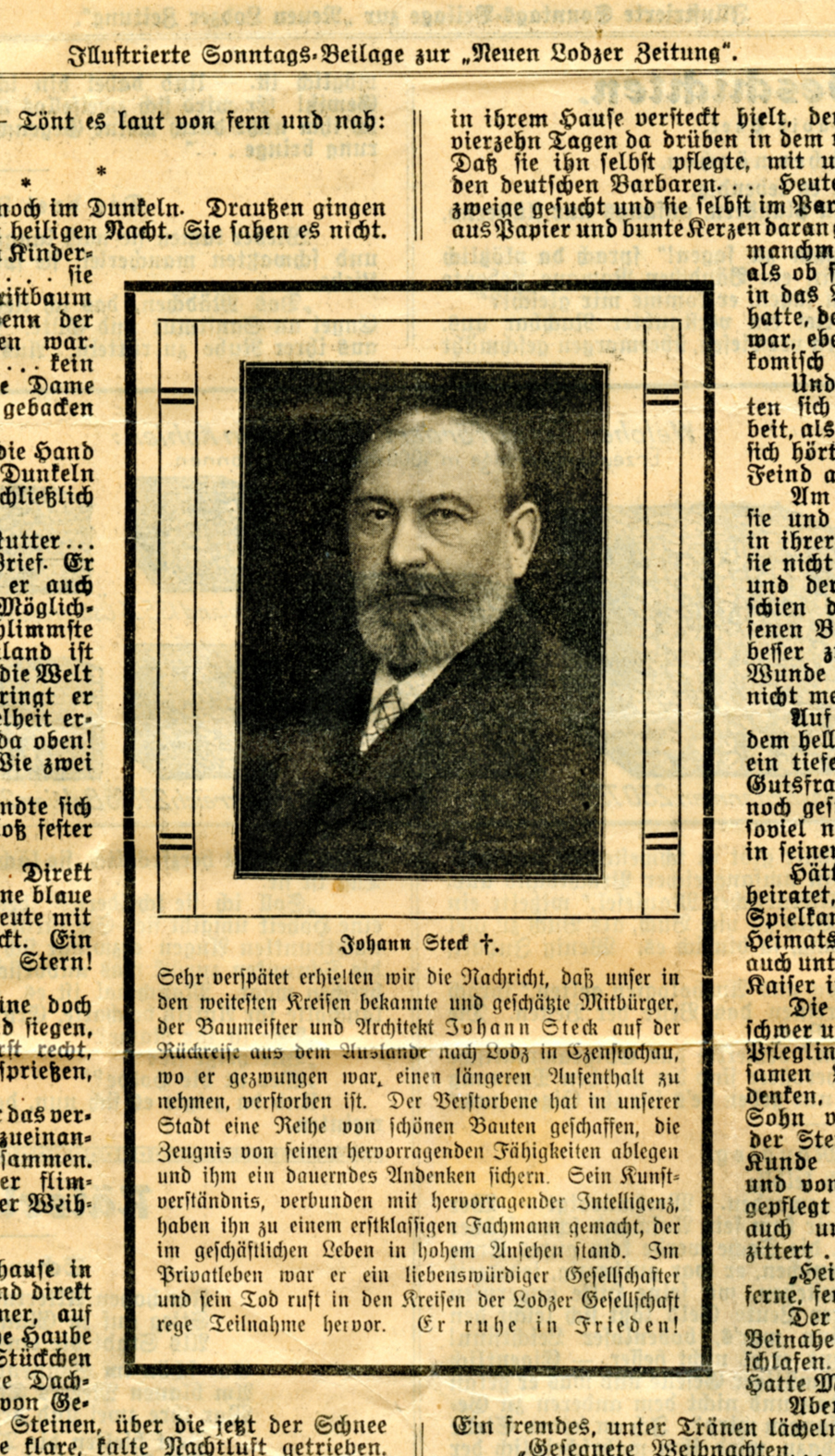
Obituary of Johann Steck

== See also ==
- History of the Jews in Poland
- List of active synagogues in Poland
