= Jacek Furdyna =

Polish-American physicist (1933–2026)

Jacek K. Furdyna
- Born: September 6, 1933; Kamionka Strumiłowa, Poland (now Kamianka-Buzka, Ukraine)
- Died: September 28, 2026 (aged 93)
- Citizenship: American
- Occupations: Physicist and academic
- Awards: Fellow, American Physical Society; Fellow, American Association for the Advancement of Science; Fellow, Nanovic Institute for European Studies, University of Notre Dame; Fellow, Institute of Physics (UK); Nicholas Copernicus Medal, Polish Academy of Sciences (2009)

Academic background
- Education: B.S. (1955), Loyola University Chicago; Ph.D. (1960), Northwestern University
- Thesis: Microwave Faraday effect in silicon and germanium

Academic work
- Discipline: Physics
- Sub-discipline: Condensed matter physics
- Institutions: University of Notre Dame
- Main interests: Magnetic semiconductors, spintronics Earlier: Blue-green laser, plasma effects in solids (helicon waves and Alfvén waves), cyclotron resonance, spin resonance
- Notable works: Palik, E D; Furdyna, J K (September 1970). "Infrared and microwave magnetoplasma effects in semiconductors". Reports on Progress in Physics. 33 (3): 1193–1322. Bibcode:1970RPPh...33.1193P. doi:10.1088/0034-4885/33/3/307. Furdyna, J. K. (15 August 1988). "Diluted magnetic semiconductors". Journal of Applied Physics. 64 (4): R29–R64. doi:10.1063/1.341700. Rokhinson, Leonid P.; Liu, Xinyu; Furdyna, Jacek K. (November 2012). "The fractional a.c. Josephson effect in a semiconductor–superconductor nanowire as a signature of Majorana particles". Nature Physics. 8 (11): 795–799. arXiv:1204.4212. Bibcode:2012NatPh...8..795R. doi:10.1038/nphys2429.

Jacek K. Furdyna (September 6, 1933 – September 28, 2026) was a Polish-American physicist and academic. He was a Professor Emeritus at the University of Notre Dame.

Furdyna is most known for his publications in condensed matter physics, and particularly for his research on elemental and compound semiconductors, in which he explored various electromagnetic phenomena, including magnetoplasma effects such as helicon wave propagation, magneto-optics, various forms of magnetism that are achieved by combining semiconductors with magnetic ions, and behavior of semiconductor nanostructures, such as quantum wells, quantum dots, nanowires, superlattices, and others. He has co-edited several books, including Diluted Magnetic (Semimagnetic) Semiconductors, and Chalcogenide: From 3D to 2D and beyond. In recognition of his research, he has been awarded honorary doctorates by University of Warsaw and Purdue University, as well as The Nicholas Copernicus Medal from the Polish Academy of Sciences for his significant contributions in designing and developing novel semiconductor materials, including magnetic semiconductors intended to perform advanced functions in computer technology.

He was Fellow of the American Physical Society, the Nanovic Institute for European Studies at Notre Dame, and the American Association for the Advancement of Science.

== Early life and education ==
Furdyna was born on September 6, 1933, in Kamionka Strumiłowa, Poland (now Kamianka Buzka, Ukraine). After invasion of Poland by the Soviet Union in 1939 at the outset of World War II, he was deported to Siberia with his mother, while his father was taken to the Gulag north of the Polar Circle. When war broke out between Nazi Germany and USSR, Polish deportees (including him among them) were formally "amnestied", and in 1942 many of them were able to evacuate from the Soviet Union through Uzbekistan to Iran, where he started attending elementary school in Teheran. He then traveled through Iraq, with short stays in Baghdad and Kirkuk, to (then) Palestine, where he was able to continue his education. In 1947 he and his mother joined his father in the United Kingdom, and at the age of 15 he immigrated with his parents to the United States, settling in Chicago in 1948.

He earned his BS degree in Physics from Loyola University Chicago in 1955, followed by his Ph.D. from Northwestern University in 1960 under the supervision of Sybrand Broersma. The title of his doctoral thesis was "Faraday Effect in Silicon and Germanium".

== Career ==
After earning his Ph.D. in experimental solid-state physics, Furdyna spent two years as postdoctoral fellow at Northwestern's Department of Electrical Engineering before joining the staff of the M.I.T. Francis Bitter National Magnet Laboratory from 1962 to 1966. He then joined the Physics Department at Purdue University in 1966 as associate professor, and was promoted to Professor of Physics in 1972. His other notable appointments include being the National Academy of Sciences Exchange Scholar at the Institute of Physics of Polish Academy of Sciences and at Warsaw University from 1972 to 1973, a Visiting Scholar at the National Research Council Canada in Ottawa in 1981, and the Director of the NSF Materials Research Laboratory at Purdue University from 1982 to 1985. He held an appointment as the Aurora and Thomas Marquez Chair of Information Theory and Computer Technology in the Department of Physics at the University of Notre Dame from 1987 until 2021, and has been a Professor Emeritus of Physics since that time.

== Research ==
Furdyna was the author or co-author of over 900 publications in the field of semiconductor physics, most of his later research activity focusing on magnetic semiconductors, their nanostructures, and their spintronic applications. His earlier interests included the physics of blue-green laser and electromagnetic wave propagation in conducting solids, including extensive studies of helicon waves, Alfven waves, and related plasma effects in semiconductors and semimetals.

He made contributions in several fields of semiconductor physics. In his early work he explored the interaction of electromagnetic waves with free-carrier plasmas in these materials, particularly in the presence of external magnetic fields. This included studies of microwave Faraday effect and a series of magneto-plasma phenomena, such as helicon and Alfven waves, cyclotron resonance, and various dimensional resonances in semiconductors. In late 1960s he launched a program based on combining semiconductors with magnetic ions, that started a new field of diluted magnetic ("semimagnetic") semiconductors (DMSs). These new materials revealed a host of novel phenomena, such helicon-excited spin resonance, a number of effects arising from modifications of semiconductor band structure by the presence of magnetic ions in the semiconductor lattice, such as spin-dependent forms of quantum oscillations in electrical transport and colossal magnetoresistance in p-type Hg_{1-x}Mn_{x}Te, a host of novel magneto-optic effects (including giant Faraday effect), as well as interesting magnetic phenomena, such as spin glass behavior and new forms of antiferromagnetic order (including helical and incommensurate antiferromagnetism), as described in his review article.

In addition to work by Furdyna's team at Notre Dame on the DMS-based quantum structures, he provided structures fabricated in his molecular epitaxy laboratory to researchers in a wide range of other institutions.

Following the discovery of ferromagnetism in semiconductors such as In_{1−x}Mn_{x}As and Ga_{1-x}Mn_{x}As in late 1990s in Japan, Furdyna extended his molecular beam epitaxy laboratory to preparation and research on these new ferromagnetic DMS materials. Jointly with collaborators in other institutions, his team demonstrated that the Fermi level of Ga_{1-x}Mn_{x}As and similar ferromagnetic DMSs was determined by interstitial Mn ions in the host lattice, thus providing a means to control this key parameter. Other investigations of his team in the area of ferromagnetic DMSs included the behavior of magnetic domains in these materials, the location of their Fermi level (which was found to reside in the Mn impurity band), detailed mapping of magnetic anisotropy in DMSs by ferromagnetic resonance measurements, design and fabrication of various DMS-based device heterostructures aimed at spintronic applications, the role of spin-orbit effects in these heterostructures, as well as fabrication and investigation of new ferromagnetic DMS alloys (e.g., In_{1−x}Mn_{x}Sb).

One of Furdyna's other contributions to condensed matter physics in the early 2010s was his collaborative work with Leonid Rokhinson and Xinyu Liu, which led to the discovery of Majorana fermions observed through fractional Josephson effect in semiconductor-superconductor nanowires. His most recent research interests involve studies of the quaternary ferromagnetic DMS Ga_{1-x}Mn_{x}As_{1−y}P_{y}, as well as of transition metal dichalcogenides and topological insulators.

== Death ==
Furdyna died on September 28, 2026, at the age of 93.

== Awards and honors ==
- Fellow, American Physical Society
- Fellow, American Association for the Advancement of Science
- Fellow, Institute of Physics, United Kingdom
- Fellow, Nanovic Institute of European Studies, University of Notre Dame
- 2002 – Doctor of Science Honoris Causa, Warsaw University
- 2007 – Doctor of Science Honoris Causa, Purdue University
- 2009 – Nicholas Copernicus Medal, Polish Academy of Science

== Bibliography ==
=== Edited books ===
- Diluted Magnetic (Semimagnetic) Semiconductors (1987) ISBN 9780931837548 (with R. L. Aggarwal and S. von Molnar, co-editors)
- Diluted Magnetic Semiconductors (1988) ISBN 9780127521251 (with Jacek Kossut, co-editor)
- Chalcogenide: From 3D to 2D and beyond (2019) ISBN 9780081026878 (with X. Liu, S. Lee, T. Luo, and Y-H. Zhang, co-editors)

=== Selected articles ===
- Palik, E. D., & Furdyna, J. K. (1970). Infrared and microwave magnetoplasma effects in semiconductors. Reports on Progress in Physics, 33(3), 1193–1322.
- Furdyna, J. K. (1988). Diluted magnetic semiconductors. Journal of Applied Physics, 64(4), R29-R64.
- Rokhinson, L. P., Liu, X., & Furdyna, J. K. (2012). The fractional ac Josephson effect in a semiconductor–superconductor nanowire as a signature of Majorana particles. Nature Physics, 8(11), 795–799.
