= Margaret Pospiech =

Polish writer, filmmaker

Margaret (Małgorzata, Gosha) Pospiech is a Polish writer, filmmaker, journalist, translator, and photographer, based in New York. She obtained her PhD from Wroclaw University where she studied literature, film and art. She gained national recognition for her work as director and writer of a feature documentary about American filmmaker Arthur Penn. Pospiech has produced several other documentaries for Polish television and compiled over 70 interviews on camera with veterans of World War II, which are now housed in visual archives at the Polish Army Veteran's Association building in Manhattan and linked to the official site of Peter Weir's movie The Way Back (2010). She has also produced experimental films, including "Heat" (2005) and video installations, including "Wasteland" (2006–2009), and "Landscapes" (2008–2010).

As a writer, she has contributed to Polish literary magazines, and written articles, essays, interviews, and reviews for both popular and academic publications. She has also published a number of novels (four of them qualified for Central Europe Literary Award) and worked as a translator (published translations).

== Filmography ==
- Arthur Penn (director, writer) (1994)
- Andrzej Lech (director, writer) (2002)
- We Don't Forget Poland (director, writer) (2002)
- Climbers (direct, writer) 2002
- A Generation (director, documentation) (2003)
- Heat (director, screenplay, cinematography, editing, producer) (2005)

== Bibliography ==
- Arthur Penn in Conversations, Toruń (2011)
- A Small Town (Miasteczko), Toruń (2014), qualified for the Central Europe Literary Award
- The Seventh Ring (Siódmy Krag), Toruń (2016)
- A Notebook (Notatnik), Toruń (2016)
- Ariadne's Labyrinths (Kłębki Ariadny), Toruń (2017), qualified for the Central Europe Literary Award
- Fog Over the River Styx (Mgły nad rzeką Styks), (2019)qualified for the Central Europe Literary Award
- Rifts in Time (Szczeliny czasu), Novae Res (2023)qualified for Central Europe Literary Award
