= László Gyimesi (pianist) =

Hungarian musician

László Gyimesi (born June 17, 1948, in Szentes) is a Hungarian pianist.

== Biography ==
He attended the Franz Liszt Academy of Music in Budapest, where he was a winner of the Academy's Grand Prize. His teachers at the Academy included Peter Solymos and Albert Simon. Subsequently he studied with Géza Anda in Zurich, György Sebők at the Indiana University in Bloomington and Stefan Askenase in Bonn.

Gyimesi was a prize winner at several international piano competitions, including the Leeds International Piano Competition, Liszt-Bartók Competition in Budapest and Valencia International Piano Competition Prize Iturbi. He has given solo recitals in USA, Canada, Japan, Cuba and most European countries. Orchestras with whom he performed as soloist include Sinfonieorchester Basel, Budapest Symphony Orchestra, RIAS Symphony Orchestra, Orchestra della Svizzera Italiana, Tonhalle Orchester Zürich and Philharmonia Hungarica.

Gyimesi held professorships at the Staatliche Hochschule für Musik und Darstellende Kunst Stuttgart and since 1986 at the Musik-Akademie der Stadt Basel — Hochschule für Musik and also taught piano at the Hochschule für Musik Karlsruhe and Hochschule für Musik Freiburg. He has given master classes in USA, Japan, Spain, France and Hungary and his master class on piano technique was published by Diplomero.
