= Stara Synagogue (Łódź) =

Destroyed Orthodox Jewish synagogue in Łódź, Poland

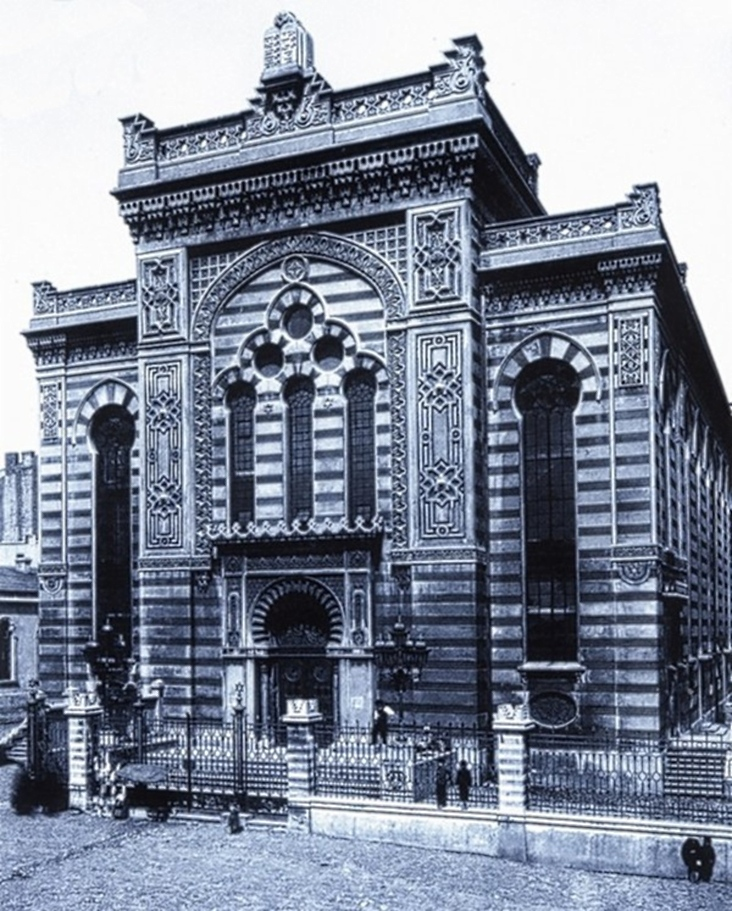
- The former synagogue, the third for the congregation, c. 1939

- Location of the destroyed synagogue in Łódź Voivodeship

Religion
- Affiliation: Orthodox Judaism (former)
- Ecclesiastical or organizational status: Synagogue (1859–1939)
- Status: Destroyed

Location
- Location: 20 Wolborska Street, Łódź, Łódź Voivodeship
- Country: Poland
- Interactive map of Stara Synagogue
- Coordinates: 51°46′52″N 19°27′29″E

Architecture
- Architects: Jan Karol Mertsching (1859); Adolf Zeligson (1897)
- Type: Synagogue architecture
- Style: Wooden (1809); Neo-Mannerist (1859); Moorish Revival (1897)
- Established: c. 1809 (as a congregation)
- Groundbreaking: 1859 (2nd); 1897 (3rd)
- Completed: 1809 (1st); 1861 (2nd); 1900 (3rd)
- Destroyed: 15–16 November 1939

The Stara Synagogue, also known as Alte Szil and Alt Stodt Shul meaning Old Town Synagogue, was a former Orthodox Jewish congregation and synagogue, located at 20 Wolborska Street, in Łódź, in the Łódź Voivodeship of Poland. Designed by Adolf Zeligson in the Moorish Revival style and completed in 1900, the synagogue served as a house of prayer until World War II when it was destroyed by Nazis on 15–16 November 1939. It was the third synagogue built in Łódź by the congregation.

== History ==
Łódź, a village of fewer than 200 people at the end of the eighteenth century, developed rapidly into a great industrial city. Łódź's first synagogue, a wooden building, was built in 1809 at 8 Wolborska Street. The land was purchased from a lieutenant in the National Guard named Józef Aufschlag. By 1854 the building was in such poor condition that it was condemned by town authorities. Services are known to have continued thorough 1861 despite the official condemnation.

Work began in 1859 on a new, brick synagogue at 20 Wolborska Street designed by Jan Karol Mertsching in a Neo-Mannerist style. The new building opened in 1861. Construction, slowed by a financial crisis, continued until 1871.

The 1861 building was replaced between 1897 and 1900 by an elaborate Moorish Revival style synagogue designed by Adolf Zeligson, a well-known Łódź architect. The architect's signed plans for the building were auctioned at Sotheby's on 17 December 2008, for $13,750.

The name Stara means old, and many Polish cities called the oldest synagogue in town the Stara synagogue. The Stara was Łódź's principal Orthodox synagogue. It was built by Orthodox industrial magnates who wished to outshine, or at least compete with, the 1881 Great Synagogue built by the Reform Jewish community.

"The [Stara] synagogue was very tall and beautiful. It contained two women's galleries. In all, it held fifteen hundred seats. There were thirty-six Torah scrolls in the synagogue and a large amount of silver Torah ornaments, including many antique works of art. All official public ceremonies took place in this synagogue".

— Shimon Huberband (1909–1942); documented the response of religious Jews of Poland to the Holocaust, before he was murdered by the Nazis.

The synagogue was burned to the ground on 15–16 November 1939 during the Nazi occupation.

Other synagogues destroyed by the Nazis in Łódź included the Great Synagogue, on 14 November 1939, and the Ezras Israel Synagogue, also in November 1939.

== See also ==
- History of the Jews in Poland
- List of active synagogues in Poland
