= Malgorzata Lamacz =

American sexologist

Małgorzata Anna Łamacz (1949 - November 2 2017) was an American researcher specializing in human sexuality and behavioral genetics. As Margaret Lamacz, she was the co-author of the 1989 book Vandalized Lovemaps with John Money. She also participated in extensive research of schizophrenia.

== Life ==
Łamacz lived in Baltimore, Princeton, New Jersey, and Pikesville, Maryland. She died November 2, 2017.

While earning her master's degree and Ph.D. at Johns Hopkins School of Medicine, Lamacz worked with John Money doing clinical psychology and pediatric sexology. There, she worked with transsexual clients, as well as children and adolescents referred for developmental or behavioral issues related to sex and sexuality. Her work with Money on paraphilia led to the concept of "vandalized lovemaps." Their book profiles seven young people based on Money's neurodevelopmental theory of paraphilia development, based on observations in non-human animals. Money and Lamacz the make observations about each outcome once the seven are adults. Because they advocated intervention in the lives of sexually different children, some colleagues criticized their approach. She and Money proposed the term gynemimetophilia as part of a paraphilic model of attraction to trans women.

Lamacz went on to work on evidence of genetic susceptibility to schizophrenia. Also tied to this is a study of velo-cardio-facial syndrome (or VCS) conducted by Lamacz and a host of other researchers. Along with a link to schizophrenia with this aberration of a small piece of chromosome 22, Lamacz and others found links to various nervous compulsions such as obsessive-compulsive disorder.

== Selected publications ==
- Money J, Lamacz M (1984). Gynemimesis and gynemimetophilia: individual and cross-cultural manifestations of a gender-coping strategy hitherto unnamed. Comparative Psychiatry. 1984 Jul-Aug;25(4):392-403. 10.1016/0010-440X(84)90074-9
- Money J, Lamacz M (1987). Genital examination and exposure experienced as nosocomial sexual abuse in childhood. Journal of Nervous and Mental Disease, 1987 Dec;175(12):713-21.
- Money J, Lamacz M (1989). Vandalized Lovemaps. Prometheus Books, ISBN 978-0-87975-513-3
- Pulver AE, Nestadt G, Goldberg R, Shprintzen RJ, Lamacz M, Wolyniec PS, Morrow B, Karayiorgou M, Antonarakis SE, Housman D, et al. (1994). Psychotic illness in patients diagnosed with velo-cardio-facial syndrome and their relatives. Journal of Nervous and Mental Disease 1994, Volume 182, Issue 8, pp. 476–477.
- Blouin JL, Dombroski BA, Nath SK, Lasseter VK, Wolyniec PS, Nestadt G, Thornquist M, Ullrich G, McGrath J, Kasch L, Lamacz M, Thomas MG, Gehrig C, Radhakrishna U, Snyder SE, Balk KG, Neufeld K, Swartz KL, DeMarchi N, Papadimitriou GN, Dikeos DG, Stefanis CN, Chakravarti A, Childs B, Housman DE, Kazazian HH, Antonarakis SE, Pulver AE (1998). Schizophrenia susceptibility loci on chromosomes 13q32 and 8p21. Nature Genetics 20, 70 - 73 (1998) doi:10.1038/1734
- Karayiorgou M, Kasch L, Lasseter VK, Hwang J, Elango R, Bernardini DJ, Kimberland M, Babb R, Francomano CA, Wolyniec PS, et al. (2005). Report from the Maryland Epidemiology Schizophrenia Linkage Study: no evidence for linkage between schizophrenia and a number of candidate and other genomic regions using a complex dominant model. American Journal of Medical Genetics Volume 54 Issue 4, Pages 345 - 353.
- Pulver AE, Karayiorgou M, Wolyniec PS, Lasseter VK, Kasch L, Nestadt G, Antonarakis S, Housman D, Kazazian HH, Meyers D, et al. (2005). Sequential strategy to identify a susceptibility gene for schizophrenia: report of potential linkage on chromosome 22q12-q13.1: Part 1. American Journal of Medical Genetics Volume 54 Issue 1, Pages 36 – 43.
