= Małgorzata Gryniewicz =

Polish film director

- Born: 8 December 1985 (age 40); Łódź, Poland
- Education: Film School in Łódź, Higher School of Art and Projecting in Łódź, Kulturama in Stockholm
- Occupations: Film director, screenwriter, investigative journalist, model
- Political party: Democratic Party
- Parent: Wojciech Gryniewicz

Malgorzata Gryniewicz (born 8 December 1985 in Łódź, Poland; also known as Eleonora Gryniewicz) is a Polish politician, journalist, casting director, and director of feature and documentary films. She is the daughter of the Polish sculptor Wojciech Gryniewicz.

== Early career ==
Gryniewicz studied film in Lodz from 2002 to 2008, including at the Higher School of Art and Projecting.

She worked for Swedish TV stations Sveriges Television, TV3, TV4, and TV6, and in Poland she worked at the news station TVN 24.

She was a producer on the film "Dandys With Money", which reached the top of the Swedish music competition "Metro On Stage".

== Politics ==
Gryniewicz's career in politics includes being secretary of the Łódź Voivodeship branch of the Polish Democratic Party from 2012 to the present; standing as a candidate for Civic Platform in local elections in Łódź in 2014; standing as a candidate for Europa Plus in the 2014 European Parliament elections; and standing as a candidate for United Left in the 2015 Polish parliamentary elections.

== Film awards ==
In 2006 Gryniewicz won the "director's best dokument" award for her film "One Way Trip" at the Prague Film Festival, and in 2007 her films "Älgar i tomteland" and "Łosie w krainie krasnali" won awards at Film Festival Onet.pl and Kino Polska.

In 2009 and 2010 her film "Treasures Ani K" (in Polish: "Skarby Ani K") won numerous awards, including the "director's best dokument" award at film festivals in Rychnov nad Kněžnou, Łódź, Wrocław,, Zielona Góra, Lądek-Zdrój, Olsztyn,, Polanica-Zdrój, Lublin, Nowa Sól,, and Gliwice , as well as an award at Media TV Plus.
