= Katarzyna Bratkowska =

Polish literary critic

- Born: Katarzyna Dominika Bratkowska; 1972 (age 53–54); Warsaw, Warsaw Voivodeship, Polish People's Republic
- Education: Polish studies
- Alma mater: University of Warsaw
- Occupations: Literary critic and teacher
- Notable work: Duża książka o aborcji
- Political party: PPP
- Movement: Feminism
- Parents: Stefan Bratkowski (father); Roma Przybyłowska-Bratkowska (mother)

Katarzyna Bratkowska (born in 1972) is a Polish literary critic, feminist, and socialist activist.

== Biography ==
=== Education ===
A graduate of Polish philology at the University of Warsaw, Bratkowska completed doctoral studies at the School of Social Sciences at the Institute of Philosophy and Sociology of the Polish Academy of Sciences, where she wrote a doctorate under the direction of Maria Janion. In 2008-2009 she lectured in postgraduate gender studies at the Institute of Literary Research of the Polish Academy of Sciences. She has published in Res Publica Nowa, Biuletyn OSKa, Czas Kultury, Gazeta Wyborcza, as well as in several edited academic volumes on women and gender. In 2008-9, Bratkowska was a visiting lecturer at the Institute of Literary Research of the Polish Academy of Sciences.

=== Activism ===
Bratkowska is the co-founder (alongside Kazimiera Szczuka and Agnieszka Graff) of the 8th March Women's Coalition which organizes the Manifa, an annual demonstration taking place in various Polish cities on International Women's Day. In the years 2001–2006 she co-founded the feminist hip-hop group Duldung. She is deeply engaged in the struggle to restore women's right to legal abortion in Poland. She caused an uproar when she declared that she was pregnant and intended to get an abortion on Christmas Eve. She was a co-founder and president of the Polish pro-choice association Same o Sobie S.O.S. in 2006, and the initiator of the "Abortion coming out" campaign, in which women confessed to having an abortion. She sat on the supervisory board of the MaMa Foundation.

With Kazimiera Szczuka, she issued the Duża książka o aborcji (transl. The big book about abortion), which aimed to inform adolescents and women of the rights they have and explain what they can do in the case of unwanted pregnancy. Just few months after the premiere, a negative campaign started to remove the book from store shelves dedicated to adolescents. Book stores surrendered to public pressure and restricted the book to shelves dedicated to adults.

She is a member of the board of the Polish Labor Party, and also a member of the Committee for Assistance and Defense of Repressed Workers. She has described communism as "the most pro-human system."

== Selected publications ==
- Szczuka, Kazimiera; Bratkowska, Katarzyna (2011). Duża książka o aborcji. Bez Tabu (in Polish). Warsaw: Czarna Owca. ISBN 9788375542158.
- Bratkowska, Katarzyna (2002). "Mak z popiołem". Siostry i ich Kopciuszek (in Polish). Gdynia: Uraeus. p. 360. ISBN 83-85732-88-8.
