= Feminism in Poland =

There are many instances of feminist ideas in Poland—most prominently in the expansion of women's rights under state socialism, the role of women in the fall of communism and even the conservative revolution after 1989 — sometimes feminism as a concept is written off either as an individualistic Western ideal or part of communist ideology, while in other cases, it’s embraced as necessary for social progress, especially in many urban areas.

Feminism is typically divided into periods and waves. However, Polish feminism has progressed outside of the typical wave structure associated with Western feminism. Polish feminism can be tied to ideals of the second and third waves of feminism, but it paradoxically exists between the waves. Polish feminists have used third wave strategies to fight for rights that are associated with the second wave like equal pay and reproductive justice, for example.

Poland stands in a unique position due to the role of the Catholic Church, complex association of feminism with communist rule in some cases, and other parts of Polish society being actively supportive of feminism. Polish cultural values, in some cases, prioritize traditional ideals, positioning feminism as a challenge to those beliefs.

== The Nineteenth Century ==
According to Eugenia Łoch, Poland experienced three successive waves of feminism in the 19th century; the first and weakest wave came before the November uprising of 1830. It was then that Klementyna z Tańskich Hoffmanowa wrote the first Polish text with 'feminist' features, Pamiątka po dobrej matce (Remembrance of a Good Mother, 1819). Though the author affirmed the traditional societal roles of wife and mother for Polish women, she nevertheless also advocated the necessity of education for women.

=== Uprisings period ===
A second and stronger wave occurred between the November 1830 and January 1863 Uprisings. This Polish period was influenced by French "proto-feminist" ideas: by George Sand's writings, and by La Gazette des femmes (The Women's Gazette).

The leading Polish journal advocating feminism was Przegląd Naukowy (The Learned Review), which published articles by, among others, Narcyza Żmichowska (the Warsaw leader of the "entuzjastki"), who advocated the "emancipation" and education of women. Żmichowska was also an active speaker on behalf of women's causes.

The first Polish woman philosopher, Eleonora Ziemięcka, wrote Myśli o wychowaniu kobiet (Thoughts on the Education of Women, 1843), which postulated that the most important aim in women's education was the forming of their human nature – and only afterwards, their femininity.

=== Positivism period ===
Poland experienced its third and strongest feminist wave after 1870, under major Western influence. In this wave, the principal advocates of the feminist cause were men. in 1870 Adam Wiślicki published an article, "Niezależność kobiety" ("Woman's Independence"), in Przegląd Naukowy, containing radical demands for equality of the sexes in education and the professions. In the same newspaper, Aleksander Świętochowski criticized Hoffmanowa's books, which he said "transform women into slaves." Another newspaper, Niwa, pushed for women's equality in education and work. The most radical feminist demands appeared in Edward Prądzyński's book, O prawach kobiety (On Women's Rights, 1873), which advocated full equality of the sexes in every domain.

The question of women's emancipation was especially important at the University of Lwów (Lemberg). In 1874 a university lecturer, Leon Biliński, gave a series of lectures "O pracy kobiet ze stanowiska ekonomicznego" ("On Women's Work from the Economic Standpoint"). He strongly supported women's intellectual and economic emancipation and their free access to higher education. His efforts later bore fruit: in 1897 the first women students graduated from Lwów University.

In Eliza Orzeszkowa's literary output, the motif of women's emancipation is particularly important. In her book, Kilka słów o kobietach (A Few Words about Women, 1871) she stressed the fundamental human nature of every woman, perverted by society.

A major figure in Polish feminism in this period and later was Gabriela Zapolska, whose writings included classics such as the novel, Kaśka Kariatyda (Cathy the Caryatid, 1885–86).

In 1889 the Russian newspaper Pravda (Truth) published an article by Ludwik Krzywicki, "Sprawa kobieca" ("The Woman Question"), which postulated that women's liberation was inherent to the capitalist economy.

== Twentieth century ==
The fourth – modernistic – wave of feminism reached Poland around 1900. While male writers focused on the 'mysterious and mystic' nature of women, female authors (e.g. Maria Konopnicka, Eliza Orzeszkowa) were occupied with more rational aspects of feminity. Zofia Nałkowska was especially active in the Polish women's movement. Her speech Uwagi o etycznych zadaniach ruchu kobiecego (Remarks about Ethical Objectives of the Women's Movement) during the Women's Congress in Warsaw in 1907 condemned female prostitution as a form of polygamy. Nałkowska's first novel, Kobiety (Women) (1906), and another novel, Narcyza (1910), denounced female passivity confronted with what she perceived as masculine domination.

=== Interwar period ===
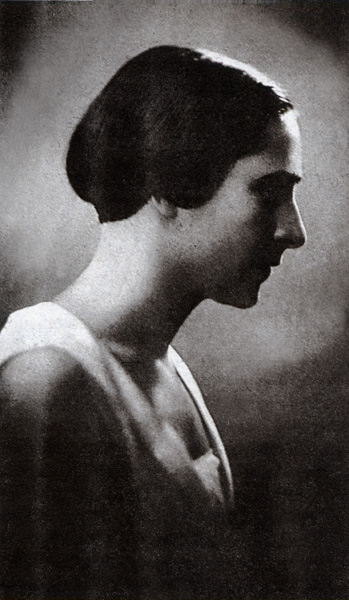
Irena Krzywicka, 1930

The fifth wave of Polish feminism took place in the interwar period (1920s and 1930s). Feminist discourses of that epoch (in Poland as well as in other countries) searched for new definitions of feminism and tried to identify new goals (there were doubts about whether to fight for full equality or rather for protective legislation). Almost every feminist (even radicals) believed that women had achieved their liberation. Róża Melcerowa expressed those feelings: Feminism (...) in fact ended among those nations where de jure had secured its object: social and political equality.

Article 96 of the Polish constitution of 1921 provided that all citizens were equal under law, however, it did not apply to married women. On 1 July 1921 the Act on the Change of Certain Provisions of the Civil Law Pertaining to Women's Rights was enacted by the Sejm, to address the most obvious inequalities for women who were married. The provisions of the Act allowed women to control their own property (except their dowry), to act as witnesses to legal documents, to act as custodian of her children if her husband was incapacitated, and to live separately from her spouse. The law also removed the requirements that a woman had to obey her husband and abolished requirements for a wife to obtain her husband's permission to engage in legal actions.

In 1932 Poland made marital rape illegal. Nałkowska continued to analyse women's questions: in the novels Romans Teresy Hennert (Teresa Hennert's Liaison, 1923) and Renata Słuczańska (1935) she dealt with the limits of women's liberty in traditional society.

The 1920s saw the emergence of radical feminism in Poland. Its representatives, Irena Krzywicka and Maria Morozowicz-Szczepkowska, shared an aggressive rhetoric and advocated women's deliverance from the emotional relationship with men ("fight against love") as the sole medium towards individual independence. Krzywicka and Tadeusz Żeleński ('Boy') both promoted planned parenthood, sexual education, rights to divorce and abortion, and strict equality of sexes. Krzywicka published a series of articles in Wiadomości Literackie (Literary News) (from 1926), Żeleński wrote numerous articles (Brewerie (Brawls) 1926, Dziewice konsystorskie (Consistory Virgins) 1929, Piekło kobiet (Hell for Women) 1930, Zmysły, zmysły (Libido, Libido) 1932, Nasi Okupanci (Our Invaders) 1932), among others, in which he protested against interference by the Roman Catholic Church into the intimate lives of Poles. Both Krzywicka and Żeleński were exceptionally active speakers, promoting the ideas of feminism in the whole country. A different aspect of Polish feminism figures in the poetry and drama (Szofer Archibald (Chauffeur Archibald) 1924 and Egipska pszenica (Egyptian Wheat) 1932) of Maria Pawlikowska-Jasnorzewska. That author advocated a female erotic self-emancipation from social conventions.

=== Under communist rule ===
Under the Soviet Union, feminism in Poland both progressed and hindered. World War II marked a turning point, greatly impacting the development of Poland as a whole, introducing both a need to rebuild the country after the destruction of the war and to embody new communist ideals.

After the war, the communist movement strengthened and the state briefly introduced initiatives to include more women in the workforce and expand social welfare programs for women. The Polish Socialist Party (PPS) and the Polish Workers' Party (PPR) established Women's Sections within the party. However, much of the cultural attitude remained stagnant and its conservative outlook was represented by the Catholic Church in Poland.

When men left for the war, and as they returned to an economy where it was difficult to afford necessary goods, women's role in the workplace was seen as more legitimate. Women were integrated into the workforce, but they experienced backlash in waves. They could best justify their presence in the workforce as female breadwinners. Polish culture was able to accept women workers as long as their work was for economic needs tied to the family–which both liberated women from domestic labor, but also tied them to the Mother Polka identity.

During the period of de-Stalinization in the 1950s, traditional gender ideals returned. Even during the earlier communist years, much of the expansion of women in the workplace was done out of necessity; because many men died at war and due to rapid plans for industrialization that required more labor. The state expanded women's roles through the creation of a welfare state, providing paid leave and free childcare to lighten the double burden of working at home and at work. After Stalin's death, the ideal of women as mothers (Matka Polka) returned and men saw female breadwinning as a threat to masculinity.

During communism, wage labor could be seen as the primary method of women's liberation. After Stalinism, there was more distance from official communist thought. Thus, after his death, there was more freedom and political openness but women were limited by the new reinforcement of gender hierarchies as they were removed from their more "masculine" jobs and forced back into the home. The state was not successful in completely returning to pre-war gender roles as women's employment continued to rise; by the 1980s over 90% of working-age women were employed.

== Second-wave feminism ==
The second-wave feminism as a period of feminist activity began in the early 1960s in the United States. The same wave reached its peak in Poland already in 1956 with the legalization of abortion, which generated the production of polemical pro-choice texts. Afterwards, feminist voices were almost silenced (until 1989); the state considered feminist demands fulfilled, any open discussion about women's problems was forbidden, only official ('materialist' and 'Marxist') feminist texts, mainly focused on taking off women the burden of 'traditional' female domestic work, were allowed. 'Western' feminism was officially prohibited and was practically absent in the Polish social life until 1989.

In Poland during the years 1940–1989, feminism in general, and second-wave feminism in particular, were practically absent. Although feminist texts were produced in the 1950s and afterwards, they were usually controlled and generated by the Communist state. In fact, any true and open feminist debate was virtually suppressed. Officially, any 'feminism of Western type' did not have the right to exist in the Communist state, which had supposedly granted to women every one of the main feminist demands.

Formally abortion was legalized in Poland almost 20 years earlier than in the United States and France (but later than in Scandinavian countries), equality of sexes was granted, sexual education was gradually introduced into schools, and contraceptives were legal and subsidised by the state. In reality, however, equality of sexes was never realized and contraceptives were of such a bad quality that abortion became an important method of planned parenthood. Those real problems were never officially recognized and any discussion of them was forbidden.

=== The fall of communism ===
The fall of communism was unexpected for the Polish public. Most believed that the systems in place were stable and would last. An organization that was instrumental in its downfall was a labor union called Solidarity. This organization was made up of about 50% women and about 10 million people were members.

In 1956, 1968, 1970, 1976 and 1980 Polish citizens led protests against communist rule. Solidarity began to represent the opposition to communism after its creation in 1980, working to represent workers in a way that communism never did. The union was established after two female workers–Anna Walentynowicz and Lech Wałęsa–were involved in a disagreement with authorities. Within Solidarity, women weren't granted decision-making roles, but were often the unofficial, spiritual leaders of protest, embodying the Matka Polka role to accomplish their goals.

In 1981, Wojciech Jaruzelski, the last leader of communist Poland, felt threatened by the organization and declared martial law, outlawing Solidarity. During this period, women were the unspoken reason behind Solidarity's underground success. Women saw themselves as part of the workers, denying gendered divisions within the organization. They created an underground network which lent itself to the beginnings of democratic institutions which would grow after the fall of communism. Daily–but crucial–organizational tasks like typing and editing articles, building teams, providing shelter and recruiting volunteers were considered women's work. Women generally saw higher representation in parliament and came closest to ideals of gender equality during periods of limited freedom.

In the 1990s, feminism experienced a backlash as the public negatively associated it with communist ideology.

=== After communism ===
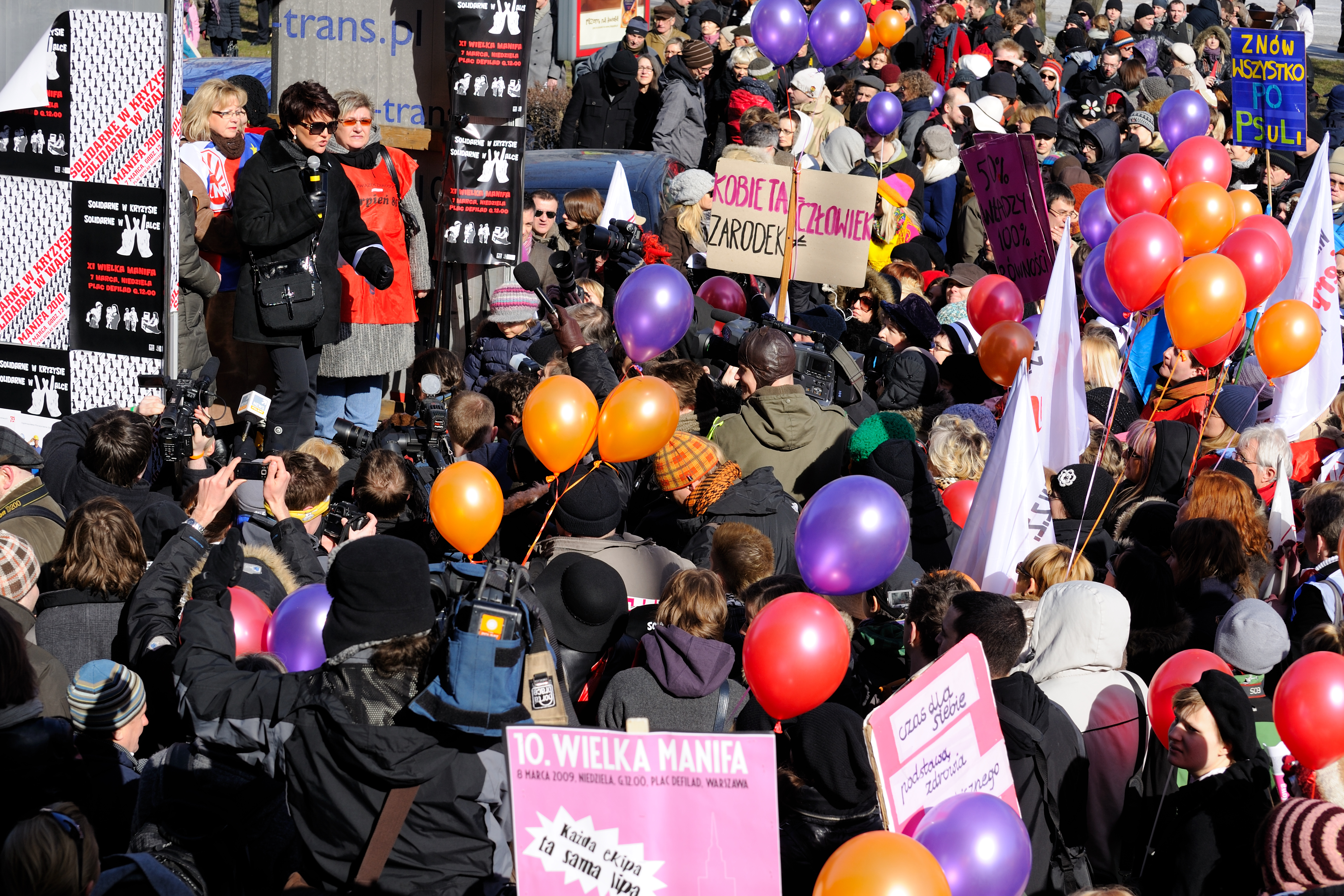
Speakers at International Women's Day activities, Warsaw, 2010.

During communist rule, Polish women enjoyed liberties (abortion, labour market, childcare) that were different from the West. However, following the transition to democracy in 1989 the government took "re-familisation" measures. Feminism in post-communist Poland is contested by the Polish public due to the influence of the Catholic Church in an ongoing "war on gender". Post-communist Poland experienced the seventh wave of feminism and was suddenly confronted with concepts of Western second-wave feminism that at once met with fierce opposition from the Roman Catholic Church. Western feminism has often been erroneously identified with the prior Communist reproductive policy, similar in some aspects, and feminism for that reason has often been regarded as 'suspect'.

In the beginning of the 1990s, Polish feminist texts often used the aggressive rhetoric related to feminist publications of the interwar period. That kind of 'striking' argumentation was more adequate in that epoch of violent polemics about prohibition of abortion. After the Polish government introduced the de facto legal ban on abortions (on January 7, 1993), feminists have changed their strategies. Many Polish feminists since that event have adopted argumentative strategies borrowed from the American 'Pro-Choice' movement of the 1980s. In Polish feminist texts, the mixed argumentation of 'lesser evil' and 'planned parenthood' has prevailed. In fact this argument is contrary to the feminist ideology and has proved ineffective. The ban on abortions has appeared immovable. State funding of contraceptives have been strongly suppressed since 1989 . But Polish feminism is seemingly undergoing change; new feminist books include Agnieszka Graff's Świat bez kobiet (World without Women) (2001), which directly points out the contemporary phenomenon of women's discrimination in Poland; and Kazimiera Szczuka's Milczenie owieczek (Silence of the Flock) (2004), which passionately defends abortion and often takes positions directly related to the interwar period and radical French feminism, thus renouncing the hitherto dominant 'moderate' American argumentative strategies. Ewa Dąbrowska-Szulc expressed the necessity of changing the Polish feminist stance as well: "We [feminists] have lost a lot by these lessons of an appeased language we are still giving each other".

Currently, Poland still has one of the most restrictive abortion laws in Europe. A proposed total ban on abortion, which had first been introduced in September 2016, and later in April 2016, has initiated a wave of demonstrations Black Protest, raising awareness about the women's right situation in Poland worldwide. Kaja Godek is a radical anti-abortion activists.

Zuzanna Radzik claims to be a Catholic feminist.

== International Women's Day ==
In Poland, International Women's Day comes with some practices that Polish feminists find problematic. Traditionally, women are given a red rose and some perfume. There is a movement by Polish feminists to change the focus of International Women's Day in order to mobilize women toward activism. In Poland, stereotypes view women as either man hating feminists (much like the stereotype seen in America) or traditional mother figures. The movement to reclaim International Women's Day is focused on viewing women as complex individuals, not just through these popular stereotypes.

Since 2000, Women's Day in Poland is celebrated with feminist demonstration actions called Manifa. Demonstrations and happenings take place nationwide, providing a platform to fight for women's rights.

== Important Women of Polish Feminism ==
Eva Kotchever (1891–1943) was an activist, owner of the famous Eve's Hangout in Greenwich Village, deported from the United States for "obscenity", murdered at Auschwitz.

Agnieszka Graff (1970) – an author, human rights activist, and a co founder of Porozumienie Kobiet 8 Marca, she works at Warsaw University's Institute of the Americas and Europe. Her written works include the book World Without Women in 2001.

Maria Janion (1926–2020) was a renowned feminist and scholar, she gave many lectures on feminist ideals and inspired many new age Polish feminists. She received an honorary degree from the Institute of Literary Research of the Polish Academy of Sciences.

Wanda Nowicka (1956) is a Polish Politician, perhaps best known for her fight for legal abortion and her work co-founding the Federation for Women and Family Planning in 1992. She graduated from the University of Warsaw and worked as a Latin and English teacher until working in politics as the Deputy Marshal of the Sejm of the Republic of Poland from 2011 to 2015.

Elżbieta Korolczuk (1975) is a Polish sociologist, researcher and leftist activist. She works at the Södertörn University in Stockholm.

== See also ==
- Abortion in Poland
- History of feminism
- Legal rights of women in history
- List of feminist literature
- Timeline of women's rights (other than voting)

== Sources ==
- Eugenia Łoch (ed.) 2001. Modernizm i feminizm. Postacie kobiece w literaturze polskiej i obcej. Lublin: Wydawnictwo Uniwersytetu M.Curie-Skłodowskiej.
- Kazimiera Szczuka 2004. Milczenie owieczek, Rzecz o aborcji. Warsaw: Wydawnictwo W.A.B.
- Kazimierz Śleczka 1997. "Feminizm czy feminizmy". In Zofia Gorczyńska, Sabina Kruszyńska, Irena Zakidalska (eds.). Płeć, kobieta, feminizm. Gdańsk: Wydawnictwo Uniwersytetu Gdańskiego: 15–34.
