= Jacek Żakowski =

Polish journalist and author (born 1957)

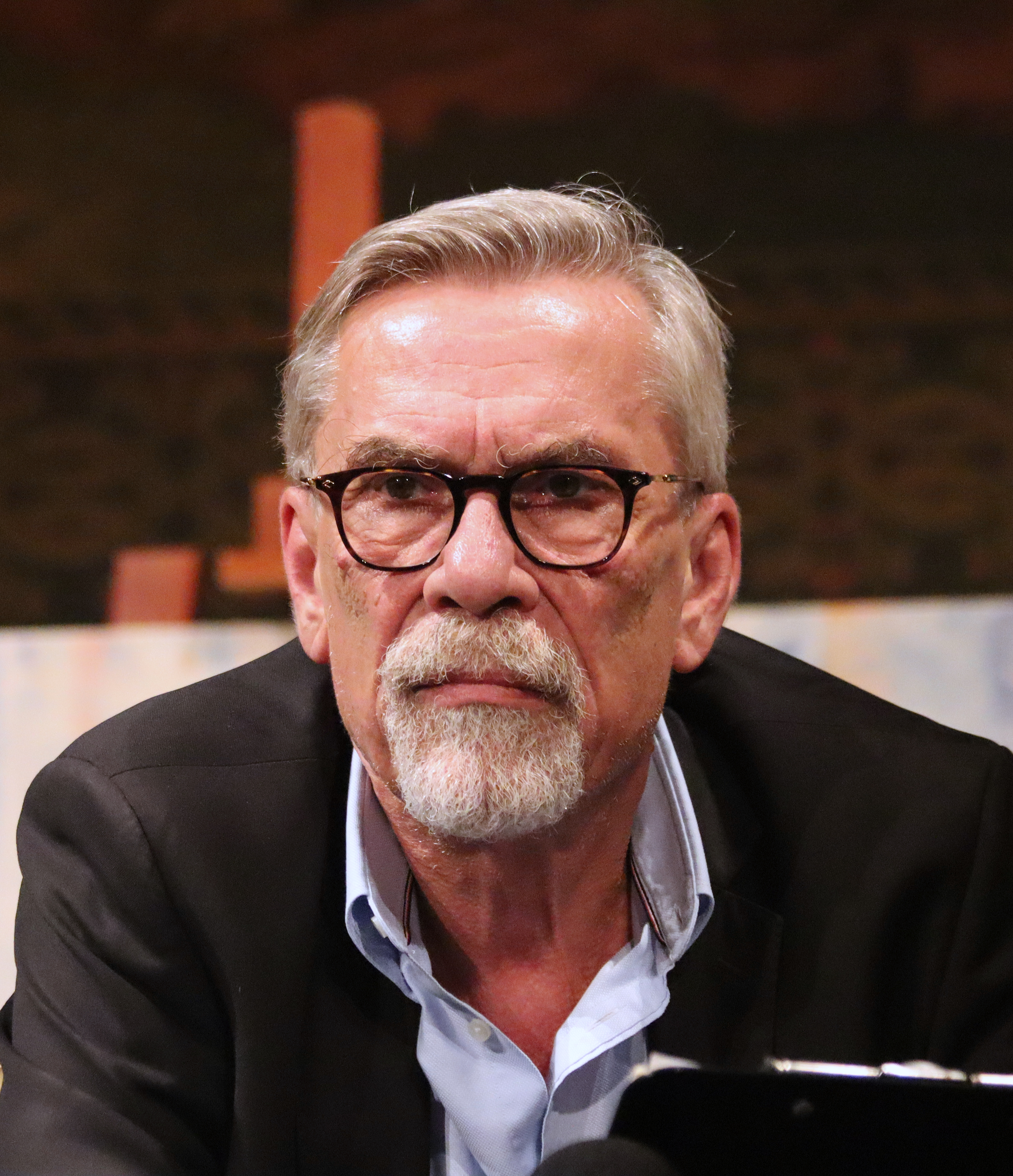
- Żakowski in 2023
- Born: 17 August 1957 (age 67); Warsaw, Poland
- Education: University of Warsaw
- Occupation(s): Journalist publicist
- Years active: 1980–present
- Employer: Collegium Civitas
- Notable credit(s): Gazeta Wyborcza; Polityka

Jacek Wojciech Żakowski (born 17 August 1957) is a Polish journalist and author. In 1989 he was head of the editorial division of Gazeta Wyborcza, 1989–1990 spokesman of the Citizens Parliamentary Club, in 1991–1992 president of the Polish Agency Informacyjna, journalist of the weekly Polityka. Since 1999 head of the Collegium Civitas Journalism Department in Warsaw.

== Career ==
Żakowski was born in Warsaw. In 1981 he graduated from the Faculty of Journalism and Political Science at the University of Warsaw.

He began working as a journalist in the weekly Na Przełaj (1980–1981), then he was active in the Press Information Office of Solidarność (1981–1983). In the following years he wrote to Tygodnik Polski (1903) and the monthly Powściągliwość i Praca (1984–1989). He was a spokesperson for the Civic Parliamentary Club (1989–1991), one of the founders of Gazeta Wyborcza and the first president of the Polish Information Agency (1991–1992).

He is a publicist and commentator on the weekly Polityka, he publishes comments in Gazeta Wyborcza and the quarterly Pragnienie Piękna. He was the host of many journalistic programs on Polish television stations such as: Tok Szok, Gość Radia Zet, Eavesdropped Talks, Summa of events by Jacek Żakowski and Jacek Żakowski's Week. Currently, he runs Friday's Morning issues in Tok FM and a show on TVN.

== TV and radio programs ==
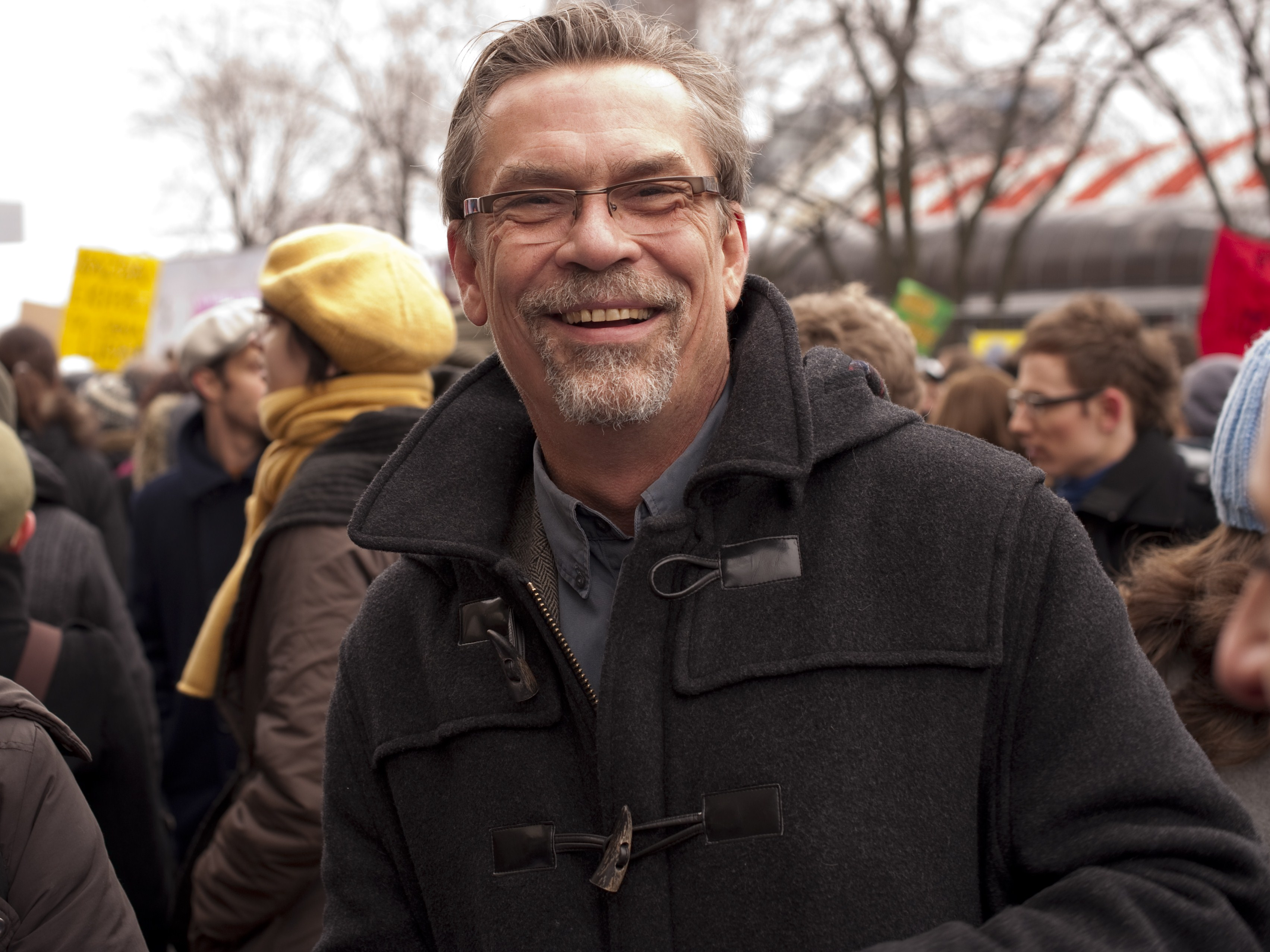
Żakowski at the 2009 Manifa, Warsaw

- Kawa czy herbata? (Coffee or tea?) on TVP1
- Tok Szok (with Piotr Najsztub) on TVP2
- Tischner czyta katechizm
- Autograf
- Talks intercepted in RMF FM (with Piotr Najsztub),
- Guest of Radio ZET on Radio Zet
- Morning TOK FM in Tok FM
- Summa events according to Jacek Żakowski on TVP1
- Tok2Szok (with Piotr Najsztub) on TV4
- Jacek Żakowski week on TVP
- Talk of the day in Superstacja
- Ex cathedra in Superstacja

== Important publications ==
- Rozmowy o Evereście (1982, z L. Cichym i K. Wielickim)
- Anatomia smaku czyli rozmowy o losach zespołu Tygodnika Powszechnego w latach 1953–1956 (1986, w drugim obiegu)
- Wyzwania: wypisy z lektury nauczania społecznego papieża Jana Pawła II (1987, z ks. J. Chrapkiem),
- Rozmowy z lekarzami (1987)
- Rok 1989 – Bronisław Geremek opowiada, Jacek Żakowski pyta (1990)
- Trzy ćwiartki wieku: rozmowy z Jerzym Turowiczem, Kraków 1990.
- Między Panem a Plebanem (1995, z A. Michnikiem i ks. J. Tischnerem)
- PRL dla początkujących (1995, z J. Kuroniem)
- Tischner czyta Katechizm (1996, z ks. J. Tischnerem)
- Co dalej, panie Mrożek? (1996)
- Siedmiolatka, czyli Kto ukradł Polskę? (1997, z J. Kuroniem)
- Pół wieku pod włos, czyli Życie codzienne „Tygodnika Powszechnego” w czasach heroicznych (1999)
- Mroczne wnętrza: uwięziony Prymas prywatnie w oczach współwięźniów i swojej siostry (2000)
- Rewanż pamięci (2002)
- Trwoga i nadzieja. Rozmowy o przyszłości (2003)
- Anty-TINA. Rozmowy o lepszym świecie, myśleniu i życiu (2005)
- Koniec (2006)
- Nauczka (2007)
- Zawał. Zrozumieć kryzys (2009)

== Decorations ==
- Order of Polonia Restituta (2014, "for outstanding achievements in the activities for democratic transformation and freedom of speech in Poland, for contributions to the development of free media and independent journalism").

== Awards and distinctions ==
- Award of the Association of Polish Journalists (1987)
- Adolf Bocheński Award (1986)
- Award Polish PEN Club. Ksawery Pruszyński (1988)
- Journalist of the Year (1997)
- Wiktor Awards (1997)
- Second prize in the European journalist competition for the article "For Diversity. Against Discrimination"
