= Kazimiera Szczuka =

Polish literary critic and television personality

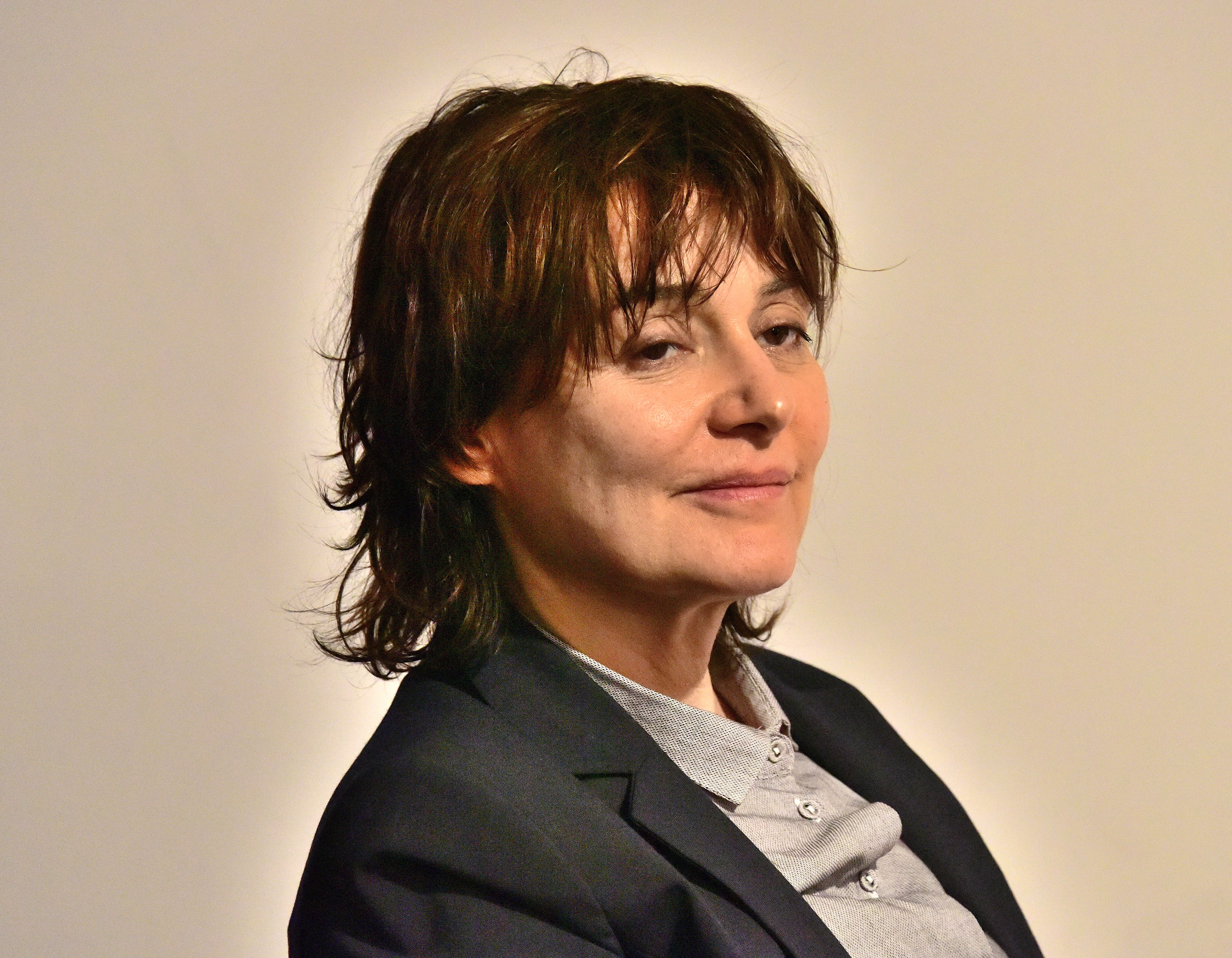
- Kazimiera Szczuka, 2017
- Born: 22 June 1966 (age 60); Warsaw, Poland
- Education: University of Warsaw
- Occupations: Literary historian; critic; journalist
- Political party: The Greens, Your Movement

Kazimiera Szczuka (Polish pronunciation: [kaʑiˈmjɛra ˈʂt͡ʂuka]; born 22 June 1966 in Warsaw) is a Polish historian of literature, literary critic, feminist, journalist and television personality, known from the Polish edition of The Weakest Link.

== Life and career ==
She was born on 22 June 1966 to father Stanisław Szczuka, a lawyer and a political dissident in the times of PRL, and mother Janina (née Winawer), a doctor from an assimilated Polish-Jewish family. She is a great-great-granddaughter of chess player Szymon Winawer. She is a graduate of the University of Warsaw where she obtained her MA degree under supervision of Maria Janion.

She published articles in such newspapers and magazines as Gazeta Wyborcza, Res Publica Nova, Teksty Drugie and Zadra. She also taught gender studies at the Institute of Literary Research of the Polish Academy of Sciences (PAN). She has collaborated with the Krytyka Polityczna circle of intellectuals and Feminoteka women's rights organization.

In 2003, she was one of the host of the Pegaz culture programme aired on the Polish state-run television Telewizja Polska (TVP). She was dismissed by TVP after she publicly used swear words in a live interview with Manuela Gretkowska.

In 2004, she published her book Milczenie owieczek (The Silence of Little Lambs) in which she discussed such topics as the right to abortion, birth control and sex education.

Szczuka is a member of the Greens 2004 party, advocate of LGBT rights and supporter of pro-choice rights for women. She is a member of the Programme Council of the green political foundation the Green Institute.

She works for TVN24 in Wydanie drugie poprawione. She has worked since 2003 for TVN in Najsłabsze Ogniwo (the Polish version of The Weakest Link) and in Dwururka. She has also appeared as a juror on Top Model TV show and as an expert on the Milionerzy game show.

In September 2022, she became a host of the popular RMF FM Afternoon Talk Show (Popołudniowa rozmowa RMF FM) broadcast on the RMF FM radio station.

== Controversy ==
In March 2006, Szczuka satirized on a TV programme Magdalena Buczek, a young woman who frequently recites prayers on Radio Maryja, claiming to not know that the woman "suffered from a crippling disease and used a wheelchair." Despite Szczuka's public apology, she was found guilty of "insulting a disabled person and mocking her religion" by the Polish National Broadcasting Council, and the station on which she had appeared was fined 500,000 PLN.

Szczuka complained later, "They hate me because I'm a feminist, I'm Jewish – mostly because I'm a feminist" in an interview for The New York Times and International Herald Tribune.

== Selected publications ==
- Kopciuszek, Frankenstein i inne ("Cinderella, Frankenstein and Others"), Kraków, 2001
- Milczenie owieczek. Rzecz o aborcji, Warsaw, 2004
- Duża książka o aborcji (co-written with Katarzyna Bratkowska); Warsaw 2011
- Janion. Transe – traumy – transgresje. 1: Niedobre dziecię (co-written with Maria Janion; Warsaw 2012
- Janion. Transe – traumy – transgresje. 2: Profesor Misia (co-written with Maria Janion); Warsaw 2012

== See also ==
- Feminism in Poland
