= IAR =

IAR may refer to:

- IAR Systems, an embedded system technology company
- The Institute of Audio Research
- The Institute of Asian Research, an institute under the Faculty of Arts in the University of British Columbia, Vancouver, BC, Canada
- "Ignore all rules", a policy on the English Wikipedia
- Industria Aeronautică Română (IAR Braşov), an aerospace manufacturer
- M27 Infantry Automatic Rifle, the primary service rifle/automatic rifle issued to U.S. Marine Corps infantry units
- Institute of Advanced Research, a private university in Gujarat, India
- Instruction address register, an alternative name for the program counter CPU register
- International Authority for the Ruhr, an organization in control of the industry in the Ruhr area from 1949 to 1952
- International Affairs Review, an academic journal in the field of international affairs
- Informacyjna Agencja Radiowa, a Polish news agency
- The IATA code for the Golden Ring Yaroslavl International Airport, Yaroslavl Oblast, Russia
- .iar, Inventory ARchive file used for avatar inventory backup in OpenSimulator virtual environments
- Investment Adviser Representative employed by a registered investment adviser, a firm that is an investment adviser in the United States
