= Paulina Krakowowa =

Polish writer, publicist, editor, teacher, and social activist

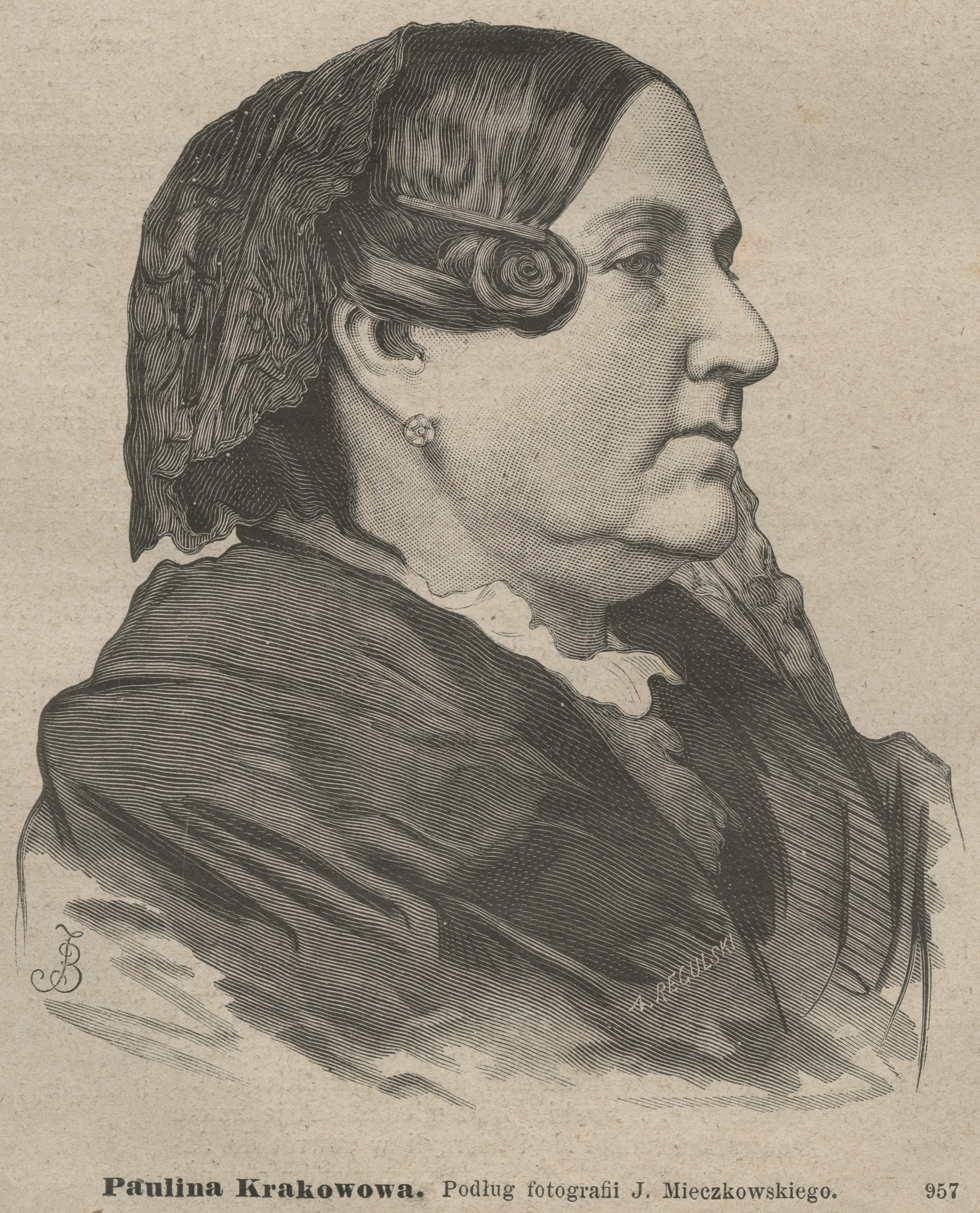
- Paulina Krakowowa by J. Mieczkowskiego, 1882
- Born: 29 June 1813; Warsaw, Poland, Russian Empire
- Died: February 16, 1882 (aged 68); Warsaw, Poland, Russian Empire
- Burial place: Powązki Cemetery, Warsaw, Poland
- Occupations: Writer, publicist, editor, teacher, social activist, boarding school founder
- Notable work: Diaries of a Young Orphan (1839), Memoirs of an Exile (1845)
- Spouse: Ludwik Kraków
- Children: 5

Paulina Petronela Krakowowa (29 June 1813 – 16 February 1882) was a Polish writer, publicist, editor, teacher, and social activist. She was the founder and supervisor of a boarding school for girls in Warsaw which she ran from 1849 to 1879. She specialised in literature for children and young people including Diaries of a Young Orphan (1839) and Memoirs of an Exile (1845).

== Early life and career ==
She was born Paulina Radziejewska on 29 June 1813 in Warsaw, Congress Poland in the Russian Empire, the daughter of Szymon Radziejewski and his wife Ewa née Sielski. Her mother died when she was young, leaving her father to care for her. At school, Paulina studied German, English and French, electing to deepen her education in the fields of literature and history of her own accord.

During the November Uprising Paulina's father lost his fortune and set up a company that sewed linen for hospitals. This company was a failure, and after declaring complete bankruptcy he committed suicide. Paulina earned a living as a private teacher.

== Woman of letters ==
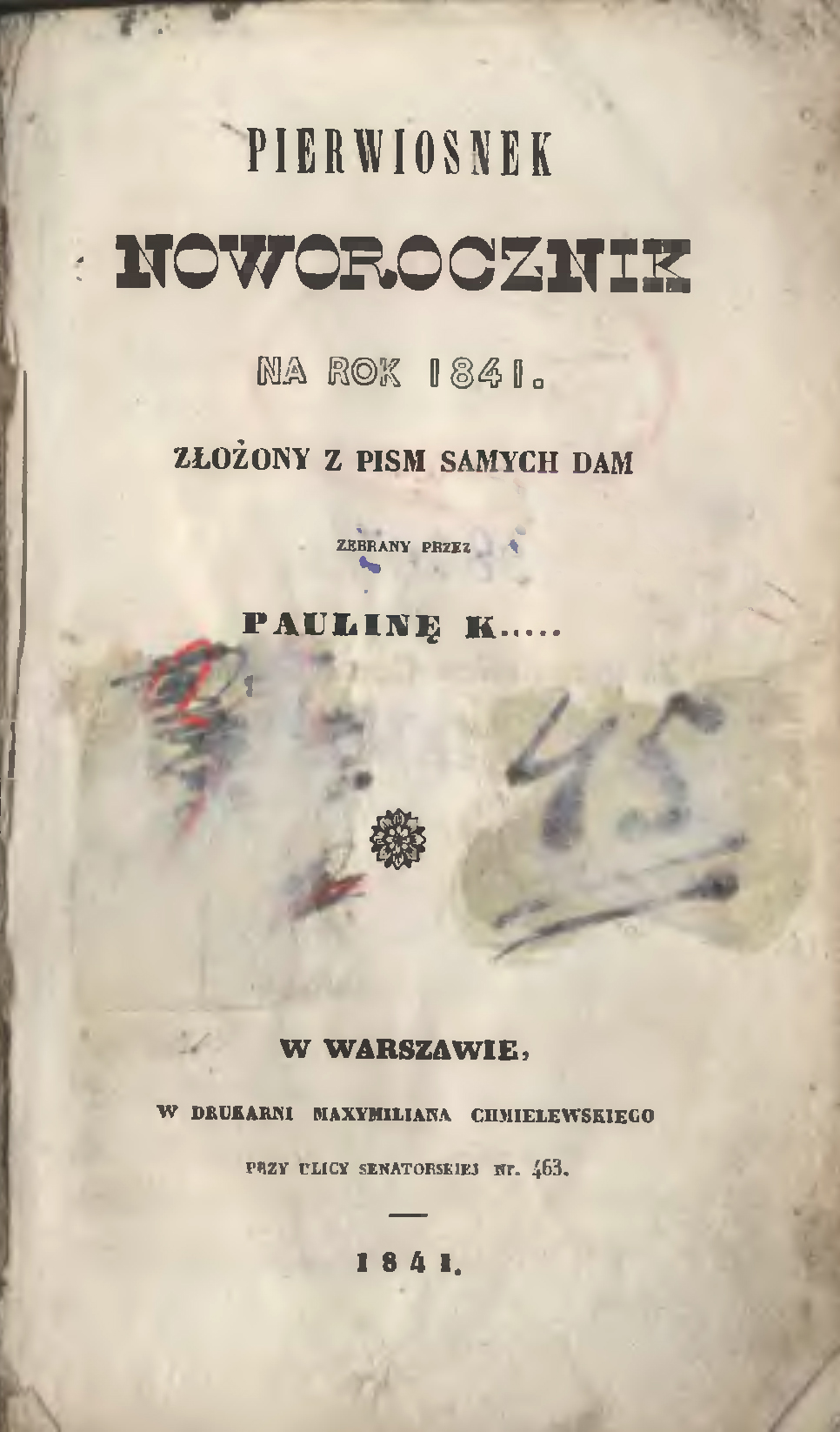
Pierwiosnek, 1841 yearbook

Krakowowa launched a literary almanac (noworocznik, a type of yearbook) under the title Pierwiosnek (Primrose) (see pl:Pierwiosnek (czasopismo)). It was reviewed in Literaturnaya Gazeta in 1840 by Pyotr Pavlovich Dubrovskii (ru:Дубровский, Пётр Павлович).

The first Polish collective publication created exclusively by women, Pierwiosnek had a group of participants largely made up of pupils and followers of Klementyna Hoffmanowa and Stanisław Jachowicz. They included Narcyza Żmichowska, who was first published there. It was published from 1838 to 1843. Pierwiosnek opposed the emancipation of women, and published anonymous articles with masculinist advocacy. Żmichowska was a leader in the Entuzjastki feminist group, whose poems were published in Pierwiosnek by Krakowowa. Efforts by Piotr Chmielowski to identify the Entuzjastki as distinctive literati, rather than activists, have, however, been criticised.

From 1843 to 1844 Krakowowa edited the bi-weekly Zorza (Dawn), with Walentyna Trojanowska. Aimed at young people, it covered themes of education and upbringing. At this period she collaborated with other magazines. In 1839 she published her first novel, Pamiętnik młodej sieroty (Diaries of a Young Orphan) which had autobiographical themes.

== Later life ==
In 1849 Krakowowa opened a boarding school for girls, which she was to run for 30 years. Norman Davies wrote that: "From 1854 to 1861, Polish education was at its lowest ebb. There was no institution of higher learning and no state-approved schooling in Polish." Krakowowa had a major influence on her pupils, and gained their lasting respect. In 1863, she participated in the Piatek association, a women's organisation helping the families of killed and imprisoned insurgents; she led meetings with Seweryna Pruszakowa (Duchińska), another writer, and Monika Korzeniowska.

In 1879, when she was 65 years old, Krakowowa retired from managing the school. The following year, her husband died. She died on 16 February 1882 from a heart aneurysm. She was buried at the Powazki Cemetery in Warsaw, and her funeral was heavily attended by the local community. The superiors of Warsaw women's boarding schools raised funds for the publishing of books for young people and organised a competition named after Krakowowa for work depicting the role of women in contemporary society.

== Writings ==
Krakowowa's works included novels, educational stories for children and short stories.

- Diaries of a Young Orphan (novel, published in 1839)
- The Tales of an Old Wanderer (collection of short stories, 1839)
- Conversations of a Mother with Children (children's book, 1841)
- Branka Tatar (historical novel, printed in Pierwiosnek in 1842)
- A New Prayer Book (1843)
- Memoirs of an Exile (novel, printed in the journal Zorza in 1844); considered the first Polish Robinsonade.
- Surprise. A Collection of Stories for Diligent Children (1844)
- Pictures and Pictures of Warsaw. A Description of Life and Architecture of the Capital. (non-fiction, 1848)
- Home Evenings. A Collection of Toys, Descriptions and Stories for the Learning and Entertainment of Good Children. (1848)
- Novels from Our History. (series of historical stories, printed 1880-81)

== Family ==
Paulina married Ludwik Kraków, in 1837. He was a former November insurgent and held a low-ranking official position. Their modest financial position motivated Paulina to continue her teaching work, and she also worked on embroidery.

The couple had five children together; a daughter Zofia (b. 1838), and four sons. Around 1862, exiled to Vologda, Apollo Korzeniowski came across their son Stanisław, working as a photographer.
