= Irena Krzywicka =

Polish feminist (1899–1994)

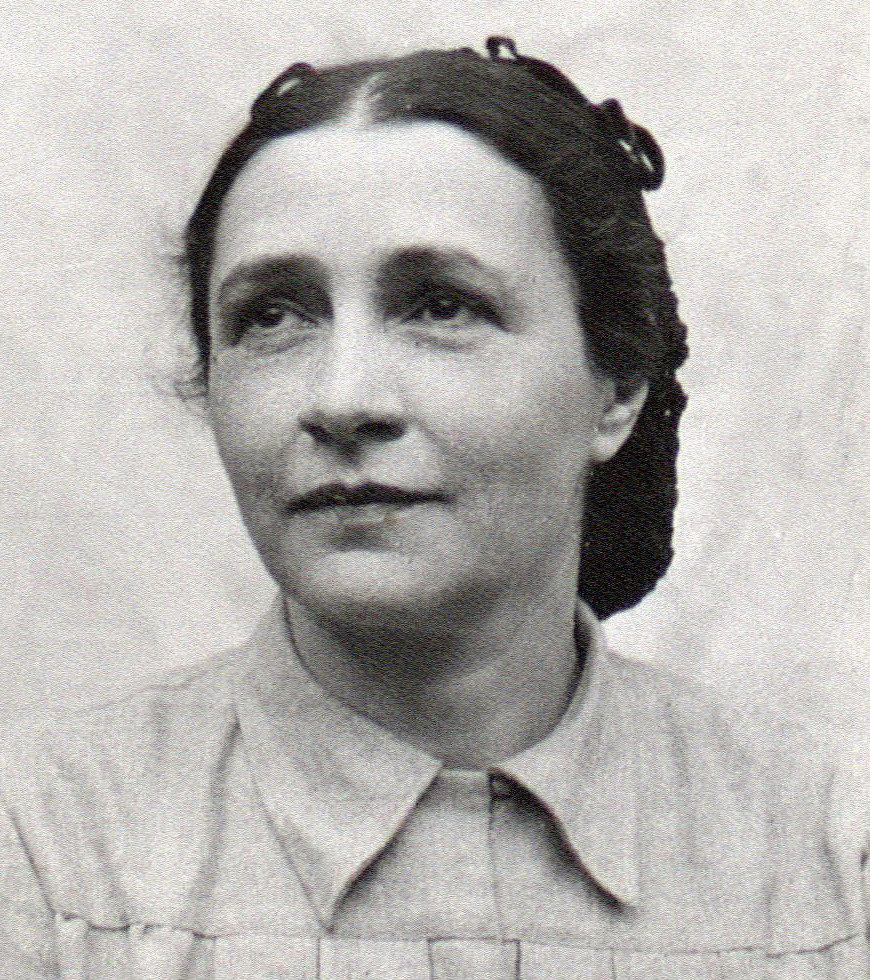
- Born: Irena Goldberg; 28 May 1899; Yeniseysk, Russian Empire
- Died: 12 July 1994 (aged 95); Bures-sur-Yvette, France

Philosophical work
- Era: 20th-century philosophy
- Region: Continental philosophy
- School: Feminism
- Institutions: University of Warsaw
- Main interests: Politics, feminism, ethics
- Notable ideas: Feminist ethics

Irena Krzywicka née Goldberg (Polish pronunciation: [ˈirɛna kʂɨvitska]; 28 May 1899 – 12 July 1994) was a Polish feminist, writer, translator and activist for women's rights, who promoted sexual education, contraception and planned parenthood.

== Biography ==
=== Early life ===
Krzywicka was born in a family of Polish-Jewish left-wing intelligentsia. Her parents were socialist activists exiled to Siberia, where Irena was born. Her father, Stanisław Goldberg, was a physician, and her mother was a dentist. During the exile, Irena's father developed tuberculosis and died three years after their return to Poland. She was brought up by her mother, a lover of Polish literature, in a spirit of tolerance and rationalism.

In 1922, Krzywicka graduated from the University of Warsaw with a degree in Polish. She did not finish her doctoral thesis because of a conflict with her supervisor. During her time at the university she published her first essay Kiść bzu ('A Spray of Lilac').

In 1923 Irena married Jerzy Krzywicki, a son of sociologist and women's rights activist Ludwik Krzywicki. The Krzywickis decided to be in an open marriage. Soon after the wedding, Krzywicka went to Corsica with her lover Walter Hasenclever, a famous German poet and playwright. She believed that her marriage was happy and had two sons, Piotr and Andrzej.

=== Feminist activities ===
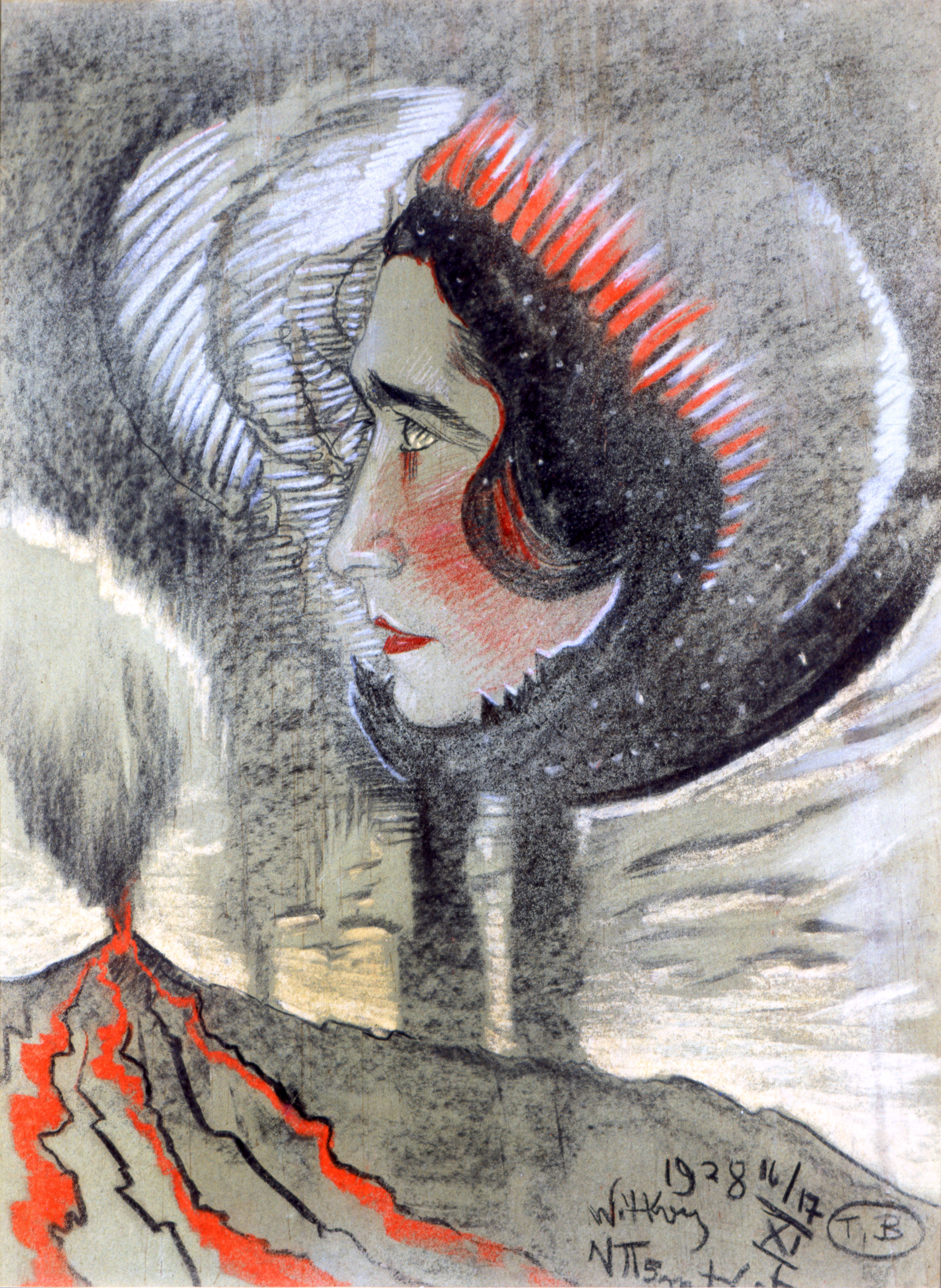
Irena Krzywicka by Witkacy, 1928

Krzywicka was an author of several novels and translated works of H. G. Wells, Max Frisch, and Friedrich Dürrenmatt. Meeting Tadeusz Boy-Żeleński turned out to be a crucial moment in her life. They fell in love and became lovers. Krzywicka's work on spreading the knowledge about sexual education and birth control made her the most famous feminist of pre-war Poland. She was considered scandalous as she talked about abortion, women's sexuality and homosexuality.

Krzywicka and Boy-Żeleński opened a clinic in Warsaw which gave information, free of charge, about planned parenthood. She was attacked by right-wing activists, who claimed that Krzywicka was "harming the nation", and by liberal writers, such as Jan Lechoń, Maria Dąbrowska and Jarosław Iwaszkiewicz, who objected to the predominance of sexual themes in her works.

=== World War II and emigration ===
During World War II and the occupation of Poland, Krzywicka had to remain in hiding under a false name because she was placed on the Nazi list of people marked for extermination. She helped the underground Home Army in resistance activities. Three people close to her perished during the war: her husband (probably murdered in the Katyn massacre), Boy-Żeleński (murdered in Lviv), and son Piotr.

In 1945–1946 Krzywicka worked at the Polish embassy in Paris, but eventually returned to Poland. She left Poland in 1962 to help in the career of her son, who was awarded a scholarship by the Ford Foundation. They went first to Switzerland and then to France. She lived for a long time in Bures-sur-Yvette, where she also died. In 1992 Krzywicka published her autobiography, Wyznania gorszycielki ('Confessions of a Scandalous Woman').

== Works ==
- Pierwsza krew ('The First Blood'), Towarzystwo Wydawnicze "Rój", Warszawa 1933; since 1948 entitled Gorzkie zakwitanie ('Bitter Blooming'), reissued by Wydawnictwo Krytyki Politycznej, Warszawa 2008, ISBN 978-83-61006-30-5
- Sekret kobiety ('A Woman's Secret'), Towarzystwo Wydawnicze "Rój", Warszawa 1933
- Sąd idzie, reportaże sądowe ('The Court is Coming', court reports), Towarzystwo Wydawnicze "Rój", 1935, reissue "Czytelnik", Warszawa 1998 ISBN 83-07-02657-1
- Zwycięzka samotność. Kobieta szuka siebie ('Victorious Loneliness. A Woman in Search of Herself'), Towarzystwo Wydawnicze "Rój", Warszawa 1935
- Co odpowiadać dorosłym na drażliwe pytania ('How to Answer Thorny Questions from Adults'), essays, Towarzystwo Wydawnicze "Rój", 1936
- Ucieczka z ciemności ('Escape from Darkness'), novels, 1939
- Tajemna przemoc ('Secret Violence'), Wydawnictwo Awir, Katowice 1947
- Skuci i wolni ('Shackled and Free'), novels
- Rodzina Martenów ('The Marten Family'), Czytelnik, Warszawa 1947
- Bunt Kamila Martena ('The Rebellion of Kamil Marten'), Czytelnik, Warszawa 1948
- Siew przyszłości ('The Sowing of the Future'), Czytelnik, Warszawa 1953
- Dzieci wśród nocy ('Children at Night'), Czytelnik, Warszawa 1948
- Dr Anna Leśna ('Dr. Anna Leśna'), Czytelnik, Warszawa 1951
- Żywot uczonego. O Ludwiku Krzywickim ('The Life of a Scientist. About Ludwik Krzywicki'), Państwowy Instytut Wydawniczy, Warszawa 1951
- Wichura i trzciny ('The Gale and the Reeds'), Nasza Księgarnia, Warszawa 1959
- Wielcy i niewielcy ('The Great Ones and the Not So Great Ones'), memoirs, Czytelnik, Warszawa 1960
- Mieszane towarzystwo. Opowiadania dla dorosłych o zwierzętach ('A Mixed Company. Stories for Adults about Animals'), Czytelnik, Warszawa 1961, reissued 1997, ISBN 83-07-02574-5
- Miłość... małżeństwo... dzieci... ('Love... Marriage... Children...'), essays published in 1950–1962, Iskry, Warszawa 1962
- Wyznania gorszycielki ('Confessions of a Scandalous Woman'), autobiography, Czytelnik, Warszawa 1992, ISBN 83-07-02261-4
- Kontrola współczesności. Wybór międzywojennej publicystyki społecznej i literackiej z lat 1924 - 1939 ('Control of Contemporary Times. A Selection from Interwar Social and Literary Journalism, 1924–1939'), ed. Agata Zawiszewska, Wydawnictwo Feminoteki, Warszawa 2008, ISBN 978-83-924783-4-8

== See also ==
- Feminism in Poland
