= Stefan Bratkowski =

Polish journalist and writer (1934–2021)

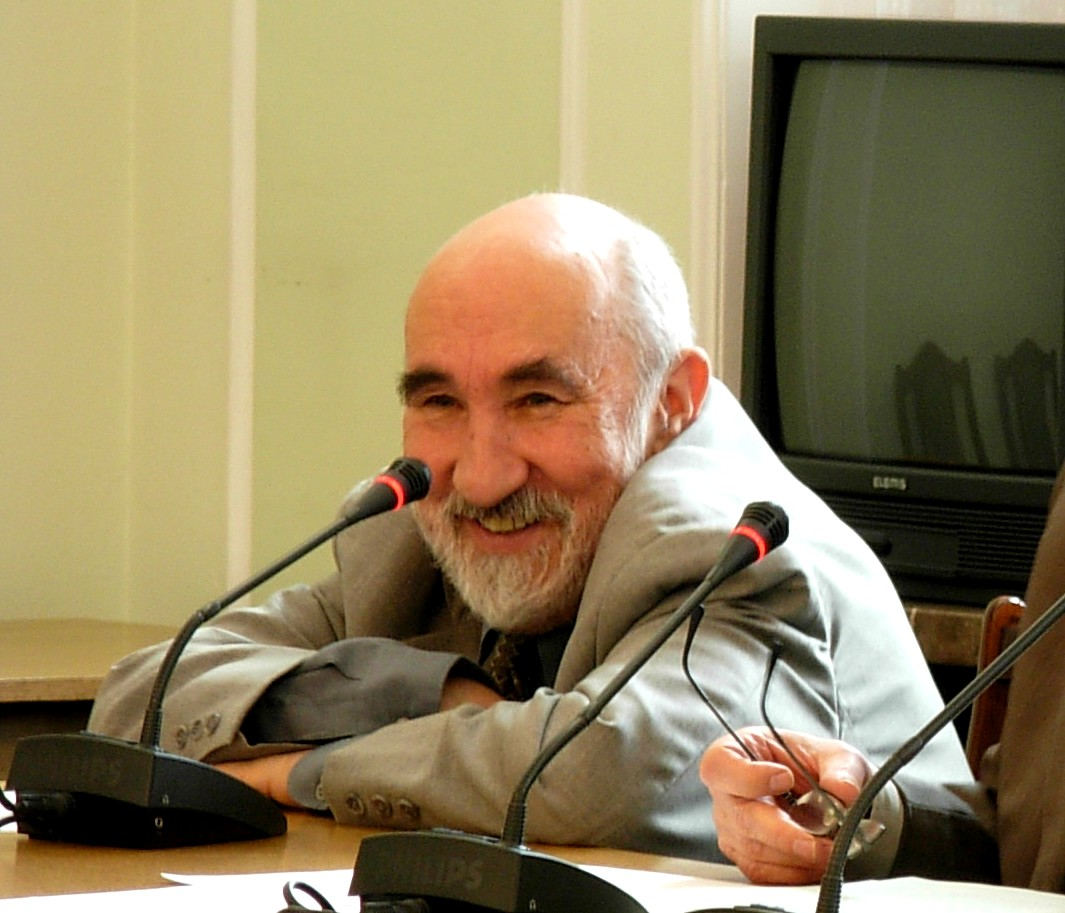
- Bratowski during a conference at the Sejm, 2008
- Born: Stefan Tadeusz Aleksander Bratkowski; 22 November 1934; Breslau, Gau Silesia, Nazi Germany
- Died: 18 April 2021 (aged 86); Warsaw, Third Polish Republic
- Resting place: Powązki Cemetery
- Occupation: Journalist
- Political party: KO "S"
- Other political affiliations: ZMP; RZM; ZMS; PZPR
- Movement: Communism
- Spouse: Roma Przybyłowska-Bratkowska
- Children: Katarzyna Bratkowska
- Relatives: Andrzej Bratkowski
- Awards: Order of Polonia Restituta
- Writing career
- Language: Polish

Stefan Bratkowski (22 November 1934 – 18 April 2021) was a Polish journalist and writer. He was an opposition activist during the Polish People's Republic.
