= Ludwik Krzywicki =

Polish Marxist anthropologist, economist and sociologist (1859–1941)

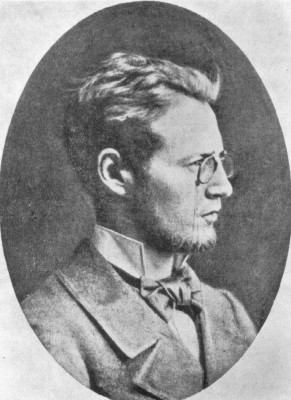
- Krzywicki in 1882
- Born: 21 August 1859; Płock, Congress Poland
- Died: 10 June 1941 (aged 81); Warsaw, General Government
- Occupations: Sociologist, Professor at the University of Warsaw
- Known for: Theory of the migration of ideas Archaeological digs in Samogitia

Academic background
- Influences: Comte; Darwin; Marx; Taine; Ribot

Academic work
- Discipline: Anthropology, archaeology, economics, sociology

Ludwik Joachim Franciszek Krzywicki (21 August 1859 – 10 June 1941) was a Polish Marxist anthropologist, economist and sociologist.

An early champion of sociology in Poland, he approached historical materialism from a sociological viewpoint. From 1919 to 1936, he was a professor at the University of Warsaw.

== Life ==
Ludwik Krzywicki was born at Płock in 1859 into an aristocratic but impoverished family. From an early age he showed an interest in psychology, philosophy, and the natural sciences, and studied works by Darwin, Taine, Ribot, and Comte.

Krzywicki studied mathematics at the University of Warsaw in Congress Poland. After obtaining his degree, he enrolled in the Faculty of Medicine but was expelled from the University on account of his political activities.

He then went abroad, first to Leipzig, Germany, then to Zurich, Switzerland, and finally in 1885 to Paris, France, where most of the Polish Socialist émigrés in Europe lived. It was in Paris that he began studying anthropology, archaeology and ethnology.

== Contributions to science ==
Krzywicki was one of the first scholars to research Lithuanian hill forts. Between 1900 and 1914 he conducted archaeological digs in Samogitia and elsewhere, photographing and excavating fortress hills. In 1908 he published Żmudż starożytnia (Ancient Samogitia), in which he sought to correlate his findings with chronicles that mentioned the castles and fortifications that he was investigating. In the same year he published an article entitled, W poszukiwaniu grodu Mendoga, dealing with where he believed the castle of King Mindaugas had been located. Krzywicki donated a large part of his findings to the Culture Museum in Kaunas, Lithuania, in 1939.

One of his most important contributions was the theory of the migration of ideas: that ideas, which are created from and spread thanks to social needs and social expectations, can "migrate" to other places or times which have not yet been capable of expressing them autonomously. When that happens, if the new ideas succeed in embodying the needs and expectations encountered at the new place, they will take root and accelerate its socio-economic development.

== Return to Poland ==
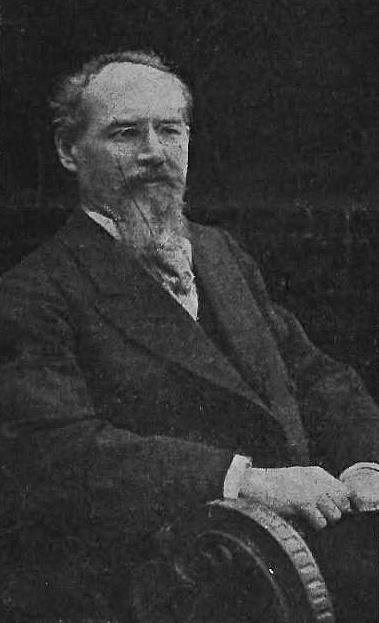
Krzywicki, early 1900s

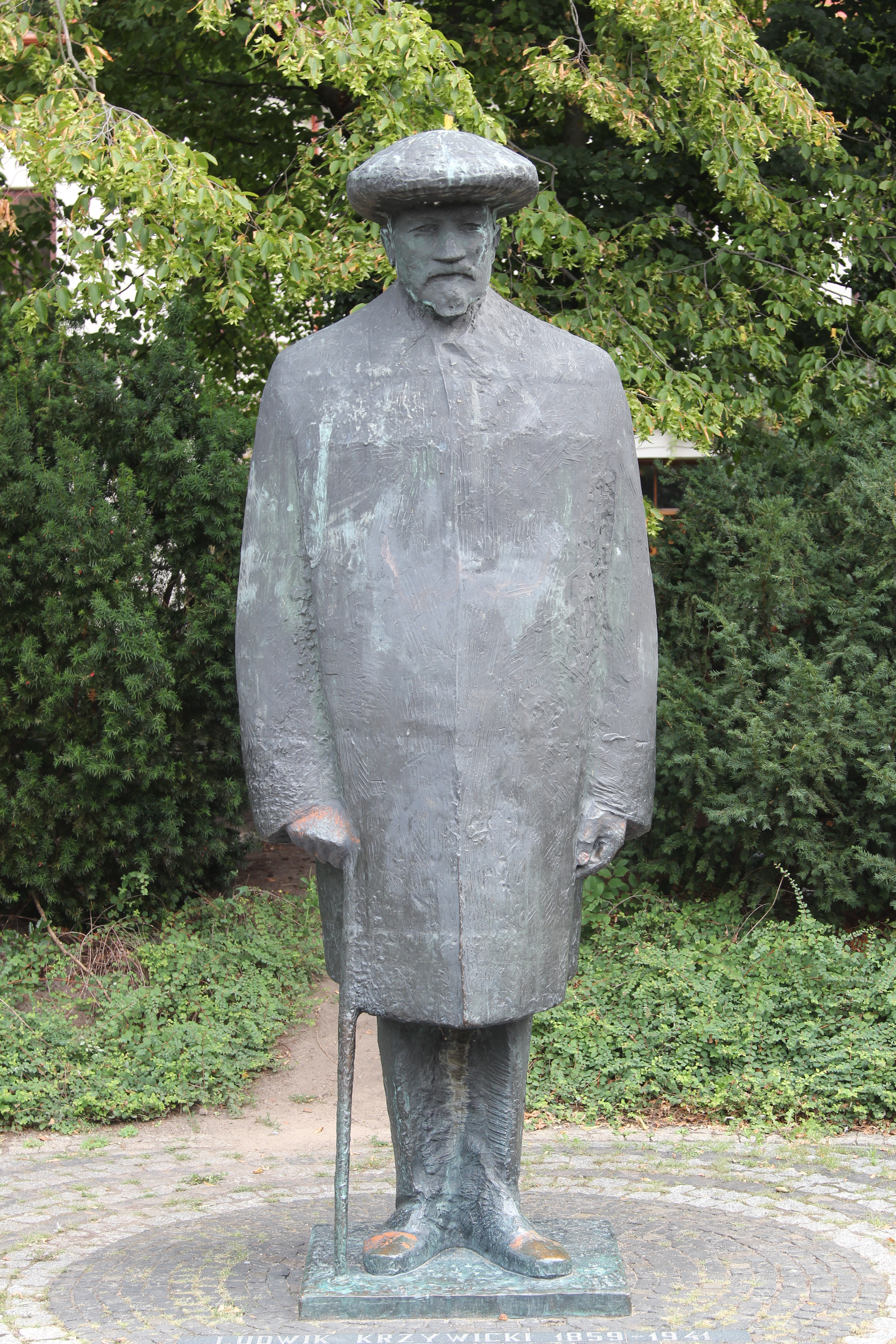
Ludwik Krzywicki monument in Płock

Krzywicki returned to Congress Poland in 1893 and continued his political activity.

When the Italian Spiritualist Eusapia Palladino revisited Warsaw in the second half of May 1898, she held at least two séances in Krzywicki's apartment.

He was arrested many times, notably when he took part in the Revolution of 1905. During this period, he edited the paper of the Socialist Party. He finished a doctorate in Lwów (today Lviv, Ukraine) with an ethnographic dissertation. Before World War I he lived in great hardship, but when the war broke out he was back in the front line of social activity, taking part in various workers and trade union organizations even though his relations with the Socialist Party had cooled.

Krzywicki was one of the translators of Karl Marx's Das Kapital into Polish.

After World War I he abandoned all political activity and focused on scientific research, intending to complete the works that he had never had the peace of mind or time to finish. However, he did take part in the organization and management of scientific bodies. He served as vice-director of the Central Statistical Office, taught at the University of Warsaw (1919–36) and other institutions of higher education, and directed the Socio-Economic Institute. During World War II he was injured during the defence of Warsaw in September 1939, and the bomb that destroyed his apartment also caused the loss of most of his papers and manuscripts. His working conditions worsened and he died of heart disease in 1941.

== See also ==
- Meme
- Irena Krzywicka
