= Agnieszka Graff =

Polish writer (1970)

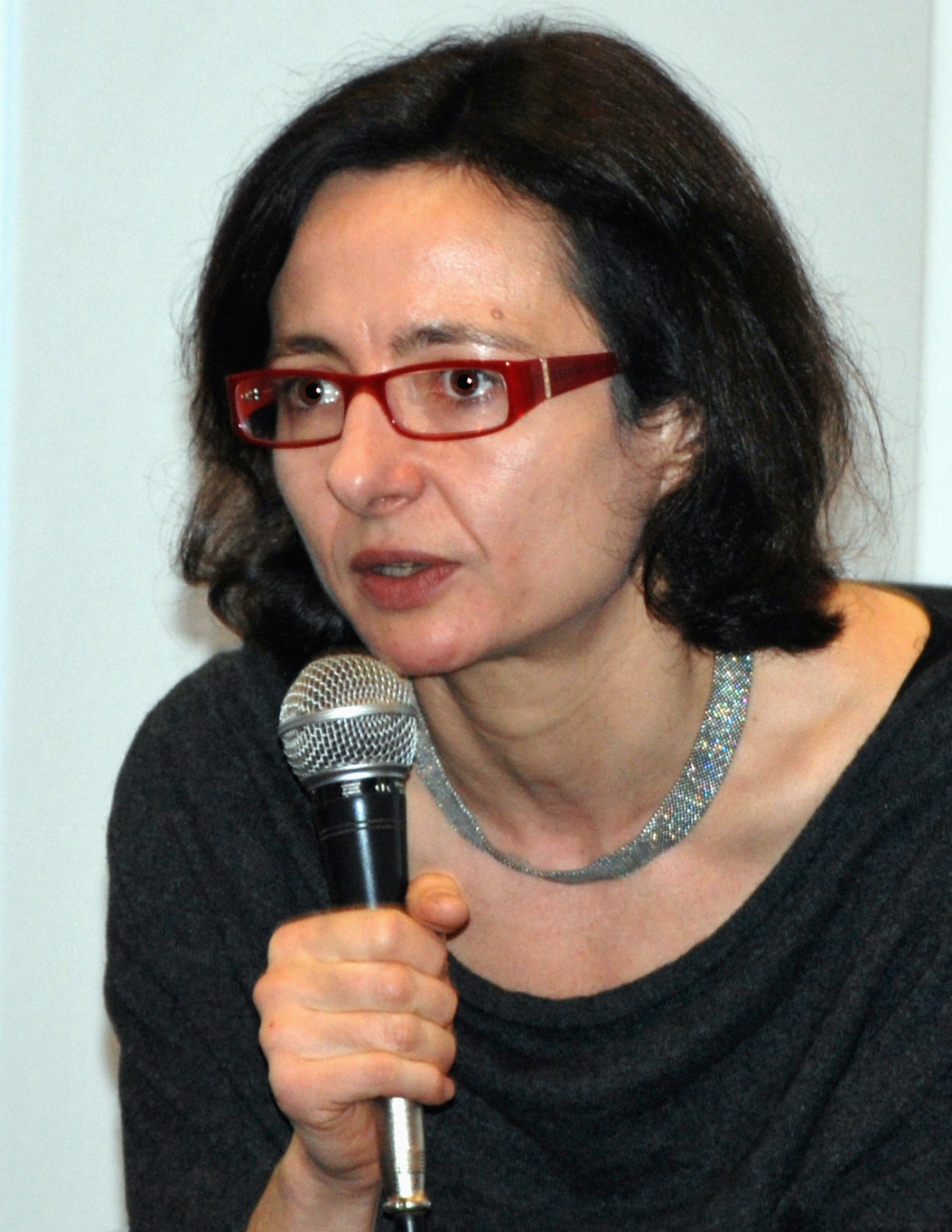
- Graff in 2011
- Born: 1970 (age 55–56); Warsaw
- Education: Amherst College
- Occupations: writer, commentator, translator, lecturer
- Writing career
- Language: Polish
- Years active: 1999-present

Agnieszka Graff-Osser (born 1970 in Warsaw) is a Polish writer, translator, commentator, feminist and women's and human rights activist. She studied at Oxford University and Amherst College (Massachusetts, United States), and graduated from the School of Social Sciences at the Polish Academy of Sciences. She completed her PhD in English literature in 1999. In 2001, she published World without women, which was nominated to Nike Award in 2002. She works at the Warsaw University's Institute of the Americas and Europe and gives lectures on gender studies.

Her essays and features have been published in "Gazeta Wyborcza" (mass circulation liberal newspaper), "Literatura na Świecie" ("World Literature") and "Zadra" ("The Thorn", a feminist magazine).

She is a co-founder of women's organisation Porozumienie Kobiet 8 Marca (8 March Women's Coalition) with which she organises the annual Manifa Warsaw women's march. From 2007 to 2010, Graff was a member of the Precedent Cases Programme's Programme Board at the International Helsinki Federation For Human Rights.

Graff is Jewish. She was the wife of the photographer and French press correspondent Bernard Osser with whom she has a son, who was born in 2008. In February 2021, she came out, by writing on her social media that she is in a committed relationship with a woman. In the March–April issue of the only Polish LGBTIA magazine, Replika, Graff and her partner, the cultural anthropologist Magdalena Staroszczyk, talked more about their relationship and queer identities.

== Selected works ==
- Świat bez kobiet. Płeć w polskim życiu publicznym. (World without women: gender in Polish public life). Warsaw 2001.
- Rykoszetem. Rzecz o płci, seksualności i narodzie. (Ricochet : on gender, sexuality, and nation). Warsaw 2008.
- Magma i inne próby zrozumienia, o co tu chodzi. (Magma: and Other Attempts to Understand, What's Up with It). Warsaw 2010.
- Matka Feministka. (Mother Feminist), Warsaw 2014.
- Jestem stąd. (I am from here, an interview with Michał Sutowski), Warsaw 2014.
- Memy i graffy. Dżender, kasa i seks. (Memes and graffs. Gender, cash and sex, together with Marta Frej), Warsaw 2015.
