= Narcyza Żmichowska =

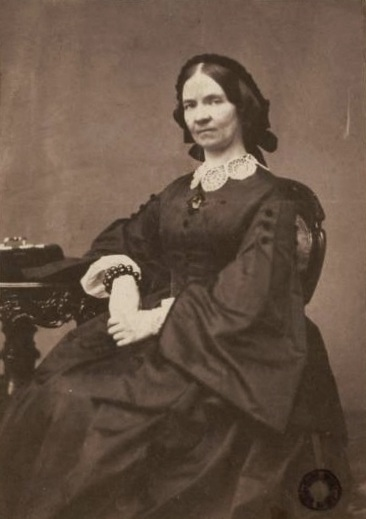
- Born: 4 March 1819; Warsaw, Congress Poland
- Died: 24 December 1876 (aged 57); Warsaw, Congress Poland
- Occupation: Governess
- Writing career
- Pen name: Gabryella
- Language: Polish
- Genres: Feminist novelist and poet
- Notable work: The Heathen
- Movement: Modernism

Narcyza Żmichowska (pronounced [narˈt͡sɨza ʐmʲiˈxɔfska]; 4 March 1819 – 24 December 1876), also known under her popular pen name Gabryella, was a Polish novelist and poet. She is considered a precursor of feminism in Poland.

== Life ==
Żmichowska became governess for the noble House of Zamoyski in 1838. She went with her employer to Paris, where she reunited with her brother Erazm, Polish revolutionary, exiled from the Russian Partition after the anti-Tsarist November Uprising crushed by the imperial army. Her brother's political and social views greatly influenced Narcyza. On his advice, she enrolled at the Bibliothèque Nationale, and became one of the first women at the French Academy ever.

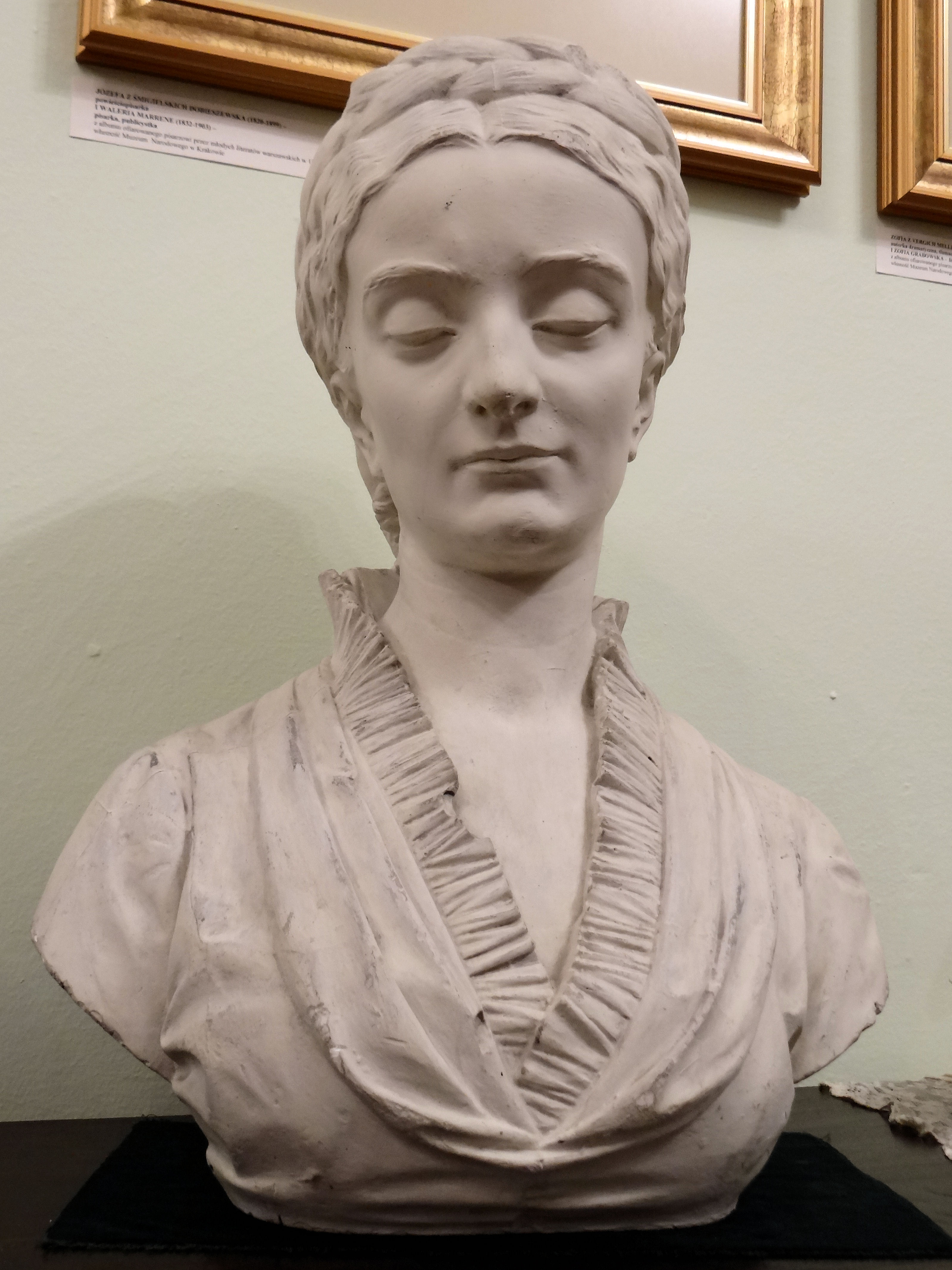
Narcyza Żmichowska by Władysław Radzikowski, bust at the Historical Museum of Kraków, 1880s

Her stay in France completely changed Żmichowska. She began to publicly express her radicalized views about women; dubbed by her bourgeois surroundings as "an excentric". She smoked cigars, which was prohibited to women. Her perfect knowledge of French enabled Narcyza to find new employment easily upon her return to occupied Poland. She became governess to four children of Stanisław Kisielecki at an estate near Łomża.

She travelled to Warsaw frequently, where she met with other intellectuals. She debuted in the literary magazine Pierwiosnek (Primrose) edited by Paulina Krakowowa, and wrote regularly for other Polish magazines under the Russian censorship including Pielgrzym (edited by Eleonora Ziemięcka) and Przegląd Naukowy, where other women published as well. Żmichowska founded a group of Suffragettes in Warsaw active in 1842–1849, who also took part in anti-Tsarist activities. She was arrested by the Russians in Lublin and sentenced to three years in prison in 1849 for her membership in the delegalized Związek Narodu Polskiego (pl).

Żmichowska's first novel published in 1846 was Poganka (The Heathen), in which she is known to have expressed interest in her friend Paulina Zbyszewska. The book was published by Northern Illinois University Press in 2012 in English translation by Dr. Ursula Phillips. Letters to friends and family written by Żmichowska were published in five volumes by Wrocław University in 1960. There, she also expressed interest in a married man, Edward Dembowski, which led to a known scandal. Her correspondence with Bibianna Moraczewska (an unmarried woman by choice like Narcyza) spanning 32 years consisted mostly of intellectual discourses.

== Works ==
- Poganka (The Heathen) OCLC 10016526
- Książka pamiątek (The Book of Mementos)
- Dwoiste życie (Double Life)
- Czy to powieść? (Is that a Novel?) OCLC 26836636
- Ścieżki przez życie (Paths through Life) OCLC 4232707
- Biała róża (White Rose) OCLC 28856696
- Wolne chwile Gabryelli (Gabriela's Free Moments)
- Wykład nauk przeznaczonych do pomocy w domowym wychowaniu panien (Lectures on Bringing up Girls)
- Wybór powieści (Collection of Novels and Novellas) OCLC 3277138

== See also ==
- List of feminist literature#1840s
