= Entuzjastki =

- Entuzjastki
- Formation: 1830
- Dissolved: 1850
- Purpose: Support women's rights
- Official language: Polish

Entuzjastki was a Polish women's organisation, counted as the first women's organisation in Poland. It was a progressive association founded in 1830 by a group of women intellectuals advocating equal rights between men and women. It encouraged the independence of women and regarded education, professional life and the economic independence this gave as the means to achieve this.

The organisation was centered around Narcyza Żmichowska. Its members included Emilia Gosselin, Wiktoria Lewińska, Zofia Mielęcka-Węgierska, Bibianna Moraczewska, Faustyna Morzycka, Kryspina Siewielińska-Stelmowska, Anna z Sokołowskich Skimborowiczowa, Wincenta Zabłocka, Paulina Zbyszewska, and Kazimiera Ziemięcka.
