= Informacyjna Agencja Radiowa =

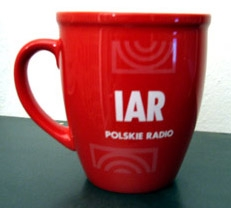
A mug with logo of IAR.

Informacyjna Agencja Radiowa (IAR) - is a press agency working with Polskie Radio in Poland since 1992. In the years 1993–1994 IAR operated as Radio-Info - the first Polish news radio completely live, without music.

It distributes text and audio reports and gets reports from the network of local, publicly funded radio stations, from foreign reporters of Polskie Radio and has its editorial team in Warsaw. The IAR distributes its reports through satellite links and the internet. Its main clients are local radio, internet portals and teletext services.
