= Maria Janion =

Polish literary critic (1926–2020)

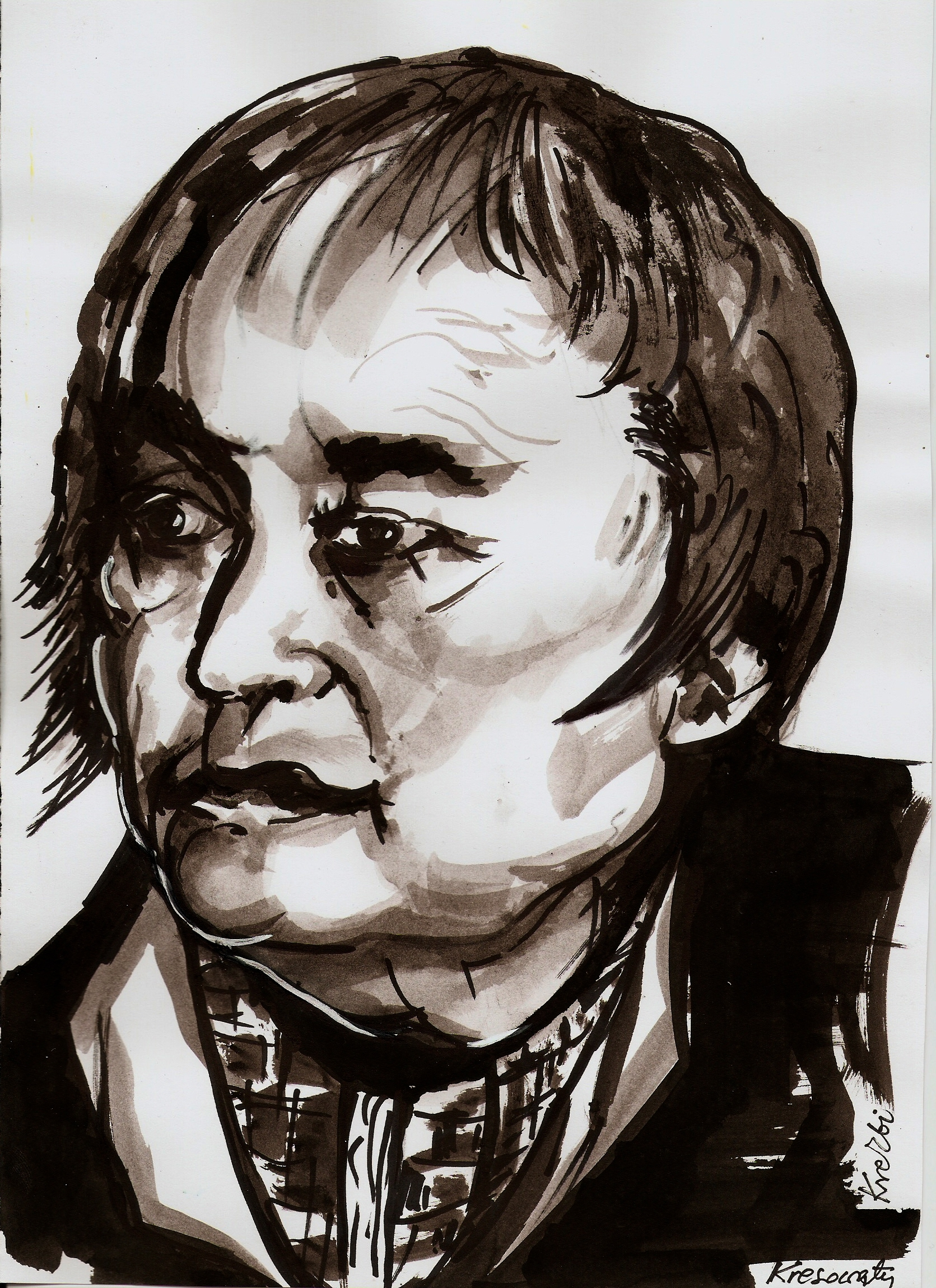
- Maria Janion, portrait by Zbigniew Kresowaty
- Born: 24 December 1926; Mońki, Poland
- Died: 23 August 2020 (aged 93); Warsaw, Poland
- Occupation: literary critic

Academic background
- Education: University of Warsaw

Academic work
- Notable works: The Project of Phantasmatic Criticism (1991); Romanticism, Revolution, Marxism (1972)

Maria Janion (24 December 1926 – 23 August 2020) was a Polish scholar, literary theorist and critic, as well as a feminist. She was a professor at the Institute of Literary Research of the Polish Academy of Sciences, specialising in literary Romanticism.

Janion was also a member of the Polish Academy of Learning. She held an honorary degree from Gdańsk University.

== Life and career ==
She was born on 24 December 1926 in Mońki, Second Polish Republic, to father Cyprian Janion and mother Ludwika (née Kurdyk). Until 1945 she resided in Vilnius, where she graduated from secondary school and spent the years of the Second World War. She was a member of the Polish Scouting and Guiding Association (Polish: Związek Harcerstwa Polskiego, ZHP), which was affiliated with the Home Army, and worked as a liaison officer. After the war, she and her family moved to Bydgoszcz as a result of the postwar population transfers.

In 1945, she passed the Matura high school leaving exam in Toruń. She studied Polish studies at the University of Łódź. Since 1946, she attended a literary criticism course run by Stefan Żółkiewski of the Kuźnica weekly magazine. In 1947, she started to publish her own articles and reviews and joined the Academic Union of Youth Struggle "Life". In 1948, she became a member of the editorial staff of the Wieś ("Countryside") weekly. In 1948, she was employed at the Institute of Literary Research of the Polish Academy of Sciences where she worked until her retirement in 1996.

Between the years 1948 and 1978 she was an active member of the Polish United Workers' Party.

In 1951, she obtained a master's degree from the University of Warsaw. In 1957, she started to work at the Higher Pedagogical School in Gdańsk (WSP). In 1968, she was appointed head of the Department of History of 19th-Century Literature. After the events of March 1968, she was dismissed from her position at the WSP as the communist authorities were concerned about her growing influence on the university students. Her lectures placed emphasis on revolutionary and libertarian aspects of Romanticism which did not adhere to the official and generally accepted interpretation of the literary canon and encouraged her students to adopt a bold, defiant and original perspective on Polish literature. After the establishment of the University of Gdańsk, she began to work at the Faculty of Polish Philology.

In 1970 Janion joined secret societies aimed against communism in Poland. She was one of the founders of an independent Society of Study Courses. In 1973, she received the title of humanities professor. In 1979, she became a member of the Polish Writers' Union (Związek Literatów Polskich).

She became more critical of the imposed views and values in regards to Polish literature, both classical and contemporary, and to Polish views on war, soldiers, heroism, military uprisings and martyrdom. In 1976 she published a study on war and form, discussing the recently published Private Journal of the Warsaw Uprising by poet Miron Białoszewski. Because she described the journal as a work portraying war and uprising from a civil, non-mythological, non-heroic perspective, she was widely criticized. She was accused, like Miron Białoszewski, of disgracing Polish values. Her independent opinions, which won respect among students and academic members, as well as her connections to the opposition, caused her to become a potential enemy of the state.

When the Solidarity movement began, Janion signed the letter issued by 64 intellectuals supporting the strikes, yet calling for actions that would not contribute to bloodshed. In 1981 she made an appearance at the Congress of Polish Culture, which was interrupted by the introduction of martial law in Poland. She called for the huge national movement, which was so far mainly driven by passion, to be turned into an intellectual effort.

In the 1990s, she joined the Society for Humanism and Independent Ethics (Stowarzyszenia na Rzecz Humanizmu i Etyki Niezależnej). In 1989, she became a member of the Polish Writers' Association and in 1991 the Polish PEN Club. In 1994, she was awarded an honorary degree from the University of Gdańsk. Between 1997 and 2004 she served on the jury of the Nike Award, Poland's top literary prize, and from 2000 to 2004 she worked as chairperson of the jury. From 1992 until 2010, she continued to give open lectures at the Institute of Sociology and Philosophy of the Polish Academy of Sciences.

She died at the age of 93 in Warsaw on 23 August 2020.

== Romanticism as a revolution of thought ==
According to Janion, Romanticism is a revolution of thought which allows different insights into history, nature and humanity. She stressed that in Romanticism with time there is increasing importance of a sense of the absurd and grotesque with regard to existence, expressed in irony and melancholy. She traces the birth of Romanticism to the re-discovery of the modern "self", which in the beginning primarily manifested itself in individualism exploring the experience and the mystery of a particular existence. The Romantic imagination revealed a new reality: an inner world of dreams and phantasms. She introduced the idea of the "subconscious human" expressing previously hidden and repressed thoughts even though there still remained various spheres of suppression. The Romantic liberation was made possible thanks to the rejection of classicism and its dogmatic and one-dimensional understanding of tradition, which restricted imagination. The Romantic multilateral and pluralistic perspective on tradition became the basis for the new cultural paradigm. However, in her work The Romantic Fever, she demonstrates that Romanticism could not hold itself to a static and unambiguous system — not even among its epigones, since they merely reinforced its antinomies and transformed them into stereotypes.

In her books, she discussed numerous aspects of this new paradigm such as the new Romantic hero; a radical violation of the death taboo; re-exploration of the hidden and forgotten which led to the ennobling of vernacular cultures (folk culture in particular, but also pagan, Slavic, Nordic and Oriental cultures); the concept of nature as a model; a mode of existence which in an inevitable way identifies creation with destruction or even self-destruction and life with death; the understanding of history as a theophany; the dramatic philosophy of existence stretching from salvation to nothingness; as well as suppressed existential experiences (that of a child, madman or a woman).

== Uncanny Slavdom ==
In the book Niesamowita Słowiańszczyzna ("Uncanny Slavdom"), Janion deployed Edward Said's concept of Orientalism to prove that in the Middle Ages Western Slavs underwent colonization by Roman Catholicism. According to Janion, Poles entering the realm of Latin influence severed them from pagan tradition and has become for them a source of trauma, which continues to affect their present collective identity. This interpretation has been challenged by Dariusz Skórczewski as a misapplication of postcolonial theory and a misinterpretation of the role of Christianity in the Polish lands.

== Personal life ==
She publicly came out as a lesbian in book entitled Janion. Transe – traumy – transgresje. She actively promoted feminism in Poland and was known for her criticism of racism, anti-Semitism, homophobia and misogyny.

== Awards and honours ==
- Życie Literackie Award for the book Romantyzm, rewolucja, marksizm ("Romanticism, Revolution, Marxism"), 1972
- Polish Academy of Sciences Secretary Award for the book Gorączka romantyczna ("Romantic Fever"), 1977
- Polish Academy of Sciences Secretary Award for the book Romantyzm i historia ("Romanticism and History") co-written with Maria Żmigrodzka, 1979
- Jurzykowski Prize, 1980
- Honorary degree at the University of Gdańsk, 1994
- Great Culture Foundation Award (Nagroda Wielkiej Fundacji Kultury), 1999
- Kazimierz Wyka Award, 2001
- Amicus Hominis et Veritatis Prize, 2005
- Golden Medal for Merit to Culture – Gloria Artis, 2007
- Paszport Polityki Award, 2007
- Finalist of the Nike Award for the book Niesamowita słowiańszczyzna, 2007
- Splendor Gedanensis Award, 2007
- Award of the Minister of Culture and National Heritage, 2009
- "Hiacynt" LGBT Award conferred by the Equality Foundation, 2009
- Special Award of the Congress of Women, 2010
- Ordre national du Mérite, (France), 2012
- Jan Parandowski PEN Club Prize, 2018

== Published works ==
In Polish:

- Lucjan Siemieński, poeta romantyczny, PIW, Warsaw, 1955
- Zygmunt Krasiński, debiut i dojrzałość, Wiedza Powszechna, Warsaw, 1962
- Romantyzm. Studia o ideach i stylu, PIW, Warsaw, 1969
- Romantyzm, rewolucja, marksizm, ("Romanticism, Revolution, Marxism"), Wydawnictwo Morskie, Gdańsk, 1972
- Humanistyka: Poznanie i terapia, PIW, Warsaw, 1974
- Gorączka romantyczna, ("Romantic Fever"), PIW, Warsaw, 1975
- Romantyzm i historia ("Romanticism and History"), co-written with Maria Żmigrodzka, PIW, Warsaw, 1978
- Odnawianie znaczeń, ("The Refurbishment of Meanings"), Wydawnictwo Literackie, Kraków, 1980
- Czas formy otwartej, PIW, Warsaw, 1984
- Wobec zła, ("In View of Evil"), Verba, Chotomów, 1989
- Życie pośmiertne Konrada Wallenroda, ("The Posthumous Life of Konrad Wallenrod"), PIW, Warsaw, 1990
- Projekt krytyki fantazmatycznej ("The Project of Phantasmatic Criticism"), PEN, Warsaw, 1991
- Kuźnia natury, Gdańsk, 1994
- Kobiety i duch inności, ("Women and the Spirit of Dissidence"), Warsaw, 1996
- Czy będziesz wiedział, co przeżyłeś, Warsaw, 1996
- Płacz generała. Eseje o wojnie, Warsaw, 1998
- Odyseja wychowania. Goetheańska wizja człowieka w "Latach nauki i latach wędrówki Wilhelma Meistra", co-written with Maria Żmigrodzka, Aureus, Kraków, 1998
- Do Europy - tak, ale razem z naszymi umarłymi ("To Europe : Yes, but Together with our Dead"), Warsaw, 2000
- Purpurowy płaszcz Mickiewicza. Studium z historii poezji i mentalności, Gdańsk, 2001
- Żyjąc tracimy życie: niepokojące tematy egzystencji, ("Living to Lose Live"), W.A.B., Warsaw, 2001
- Wampir: biografia symboliczna ("Vampire: A Symbolic Biography"), Gdańsk, 2002
- Romantyzm i egzystencja, ("Romanticism and Existence") with Maria Żmigrodzka, 2004
- Niesamowita Słowiańszczyzna, WL, Kraków, 2006

In English:

- Hero, Conspiracy, and Death: The Jewish Lectures, translated by Alex Shannon (2014)
- "Poland Between the West and the East", translated by Anna Warso (2014), in Teksty Drugie, 1, pp. 13–33. Special Issue – English Edition (https://rcin.org.pl/Content/51830/WA248_71041_P-I-2524_janion-poland.pdf)
