= Manifa =

Annual feminist organization every March 8 in Poland

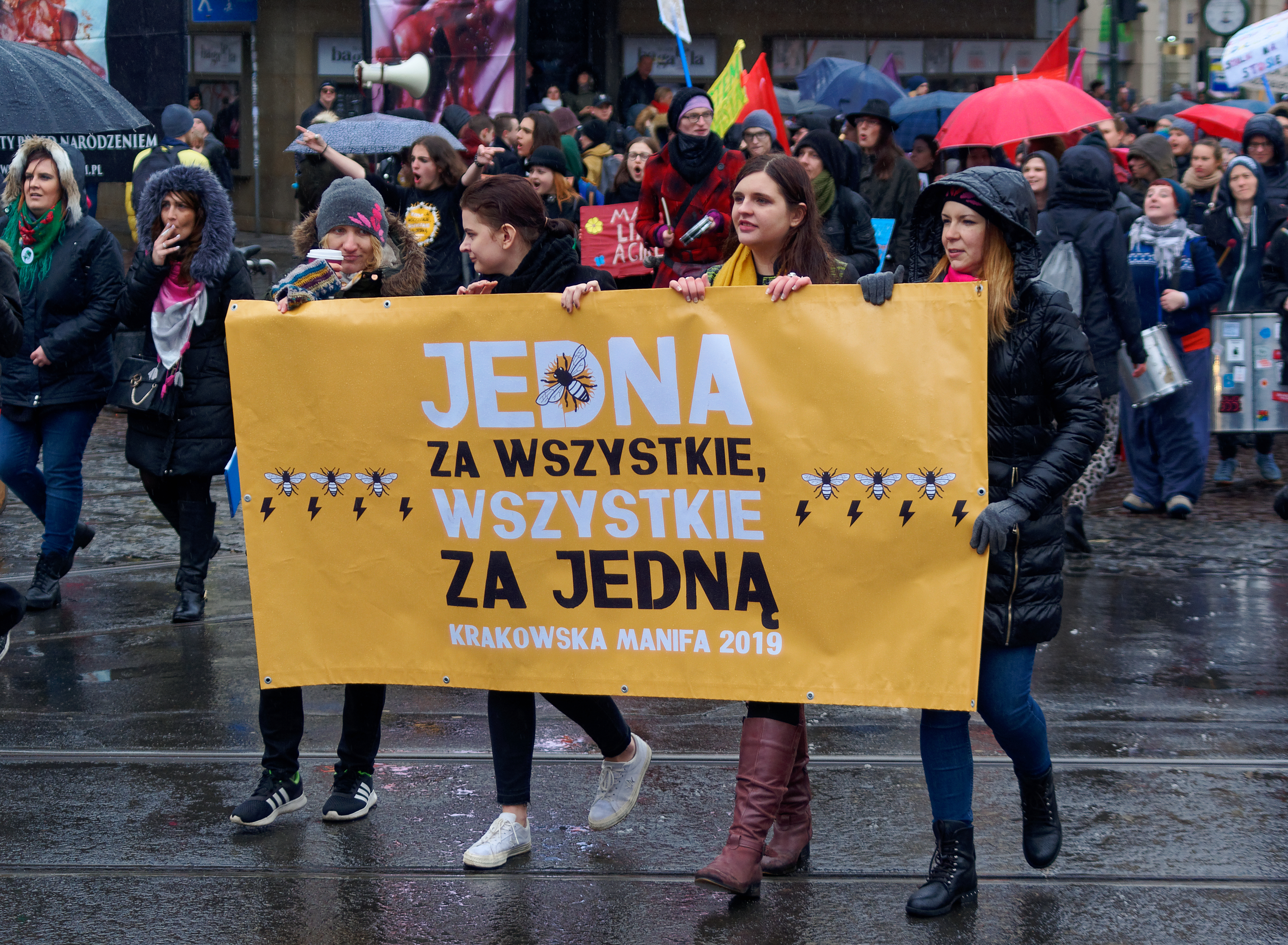
Manifa 2019 in Kraków (one for all, all for one)

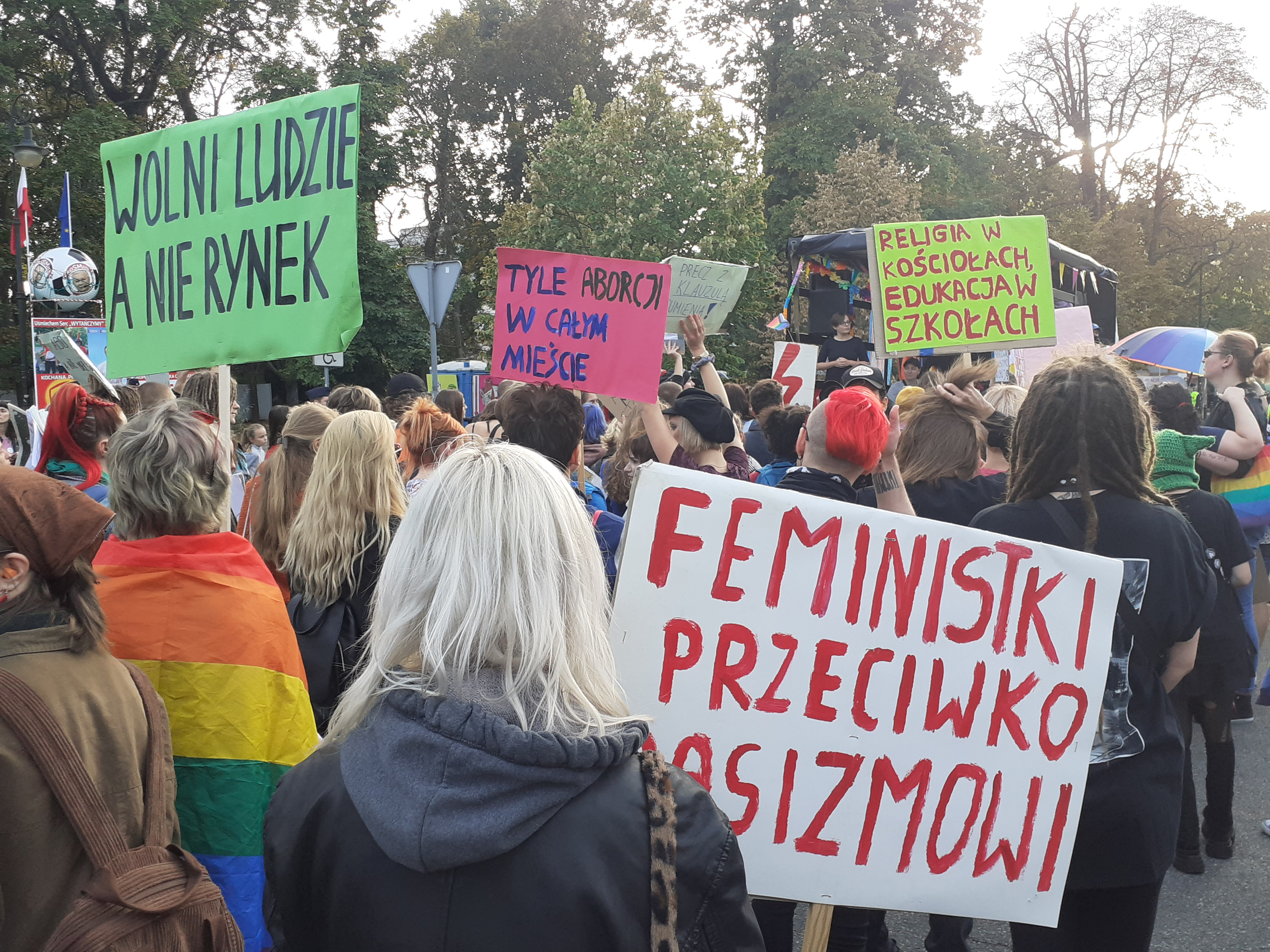
Manifa 2023 in Warsaw.

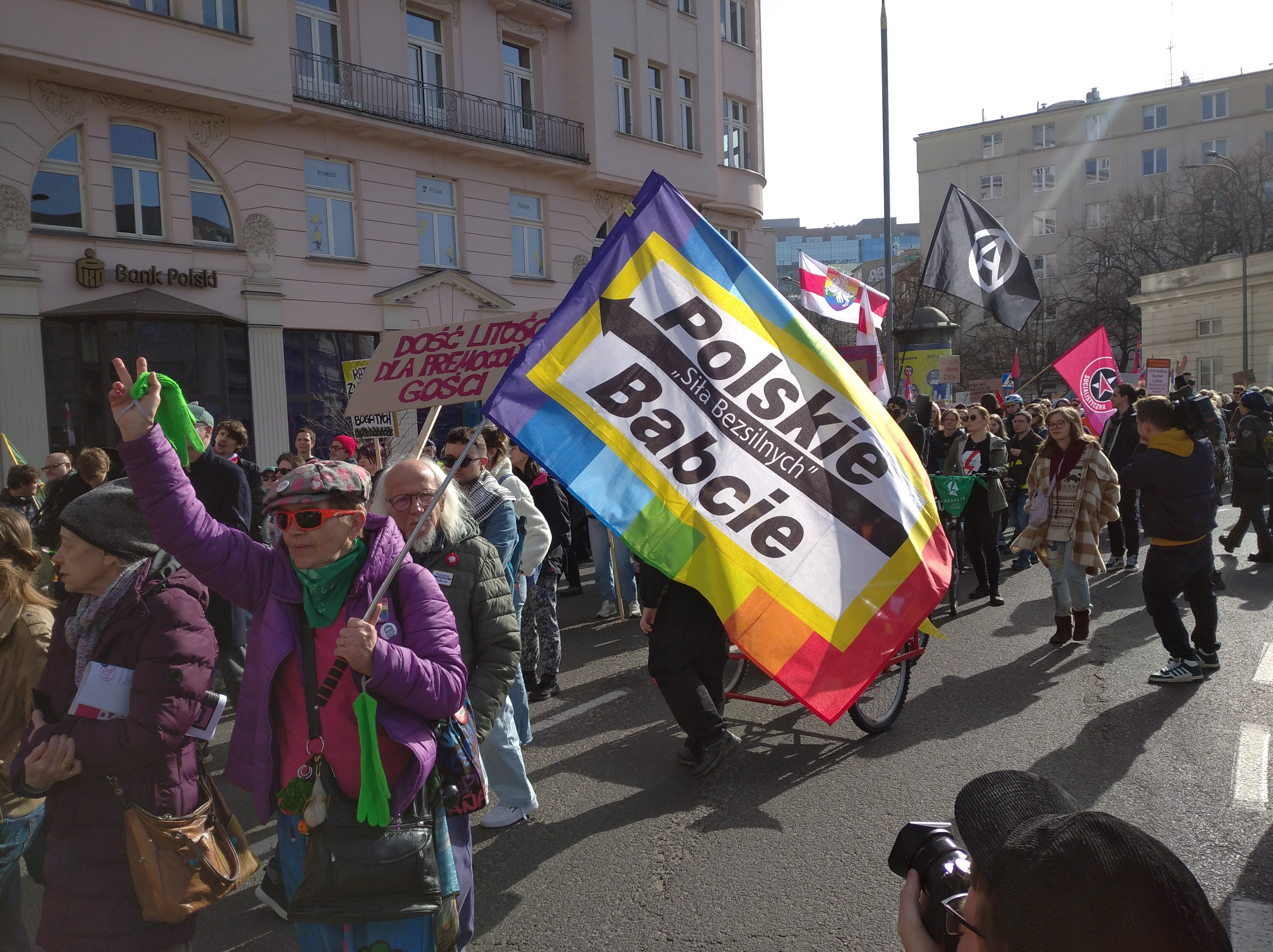
Manifa 2026 in Warsaw.

Manifa is an annual feminist demonstration organized in connection with International Women's Day on March 8 in various parts of Poland. In Warsaw, it is organized by the informal group Alliance of Women. The name comes from the slang abbreviation for the word manifestacja, used in this form by the anti-government opposition in the 1980s. In 2007 the Manifa was called the "March of Women's Solidarity" (alluding to the Solidarity Movement) and emphasizing the commonalities of women's struggles. It represents the power of women and how they have the moral right to obtain the final say in their decisions. June 4, 2009, was the twentieth anniversary for the celebration of freedom of speech and the will of the people.

The first Manifa in 2000 was organized to protest against a violent enforcement of anti-abortion law in Lubliniec, where police officers detained a gynecologist patient during an examination and forced her to undergo a forensic examination. It turned into a nationwide feminist, anti-discrimination, and anti-clerical demonstration. The motto of the first Manifa was "Democracy without women is only half-democracy." In later demonstrations, the focus shifted to economic and employment issues. The motto of the 2011 Manifa was "Enough of exploitation! We give notice!" and was attended by the All-Poland Alliance of Trade Unions, the Polish Trade Union of Nurses and Midwives, the August 80 Free Trade Union, and the Polish Teachers' Association. In March 2017, 4,000 people marched under the slogan “Against the Violence of Power” in Warsaw, along with protesters in eight other cities in Poland. The crowd was larger than usually, after the opposition movement blossomed in Poland since the election of Law and Justice Party in October 2015. The 19th Manifa in 2018 was focused on Poland's strict anti-abortion law. Approximately 2,000 women walked through Warsaw for an annual Women's Day march in defense of women's rights, including the unrestricted right to abortion. The march focused on Poland's strict anti-abortion law and was a response to Poland's ruling party's plan to ban the possibility of abortion of sick fetuses, which has drawn vehement protests from women's organizations.

The 20th Manifa took place on March 3, 2019, with its slogan being "We are the Revolution. No more being nice to violent guys". When the women were asked for the reasoning behind the 20th Manifa slogan, they said that it represents the network women have when they all work together. Moreover, that women are a force to be reckoned with because of the resonation between women and women. Moving into 2020, Manifa The 21st Warsaw Manifa happened on 8 March 2020. The slogan for the 21st Manifa translated stands for "We are the granddaughters of the witches, who could not be burn".
