= List of gay, lesbian or bisexual people: L =

This is a partial list of famous people who were or identify themselves as gay men, lesbian or bisexual.

The definition of sexual orientation has changed greatly over time and the general term "gay" wasn't used to describe sexual orientation until the 20th century. A number of different classification schemes have been used to describe sexual orientation since the mid-19th century. Much of the research about sexual orientation has failed to define the term at all, making it difficult to reconcile the results of different studies. However, most definitions include a psychological component (such as the direction of an individual's erotic desire) and/or a behavioural component (which focuses on the sex of the individual's sexual partner/s). Some prefer to simply follow an individual's self-definition or identity.

The high prevalence of people from the West on this list may be due to societal attitudes towards homosexuality. The Pew Research Center's 2013 Global Attitudes Survey found that there is "greater acceptance in more secular and affluent countries," with "publics in 39 countries [having] broad acceptance of homosexuality in North America, the European Union, and much of Latin America, but equally widespread rejection in predominantly Muslim nations and in Africa, as well as in parts of Asia and in Russia. Opinion about the acceptability of homosexuality is divided in Israel, Poland and Bolivia." As of 2013, Americans are divided – a majority (60 percent) believes homosexuality should be accepted, while 33 percent disagree.

== L ==
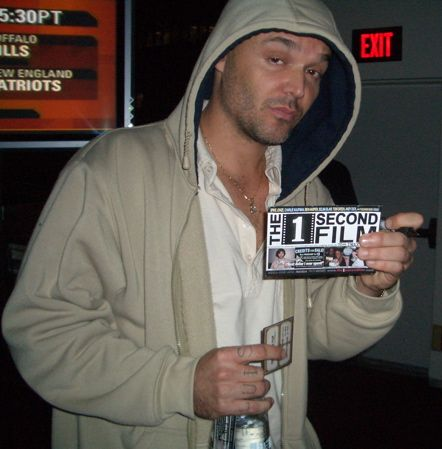
Photographer David LaChapelle

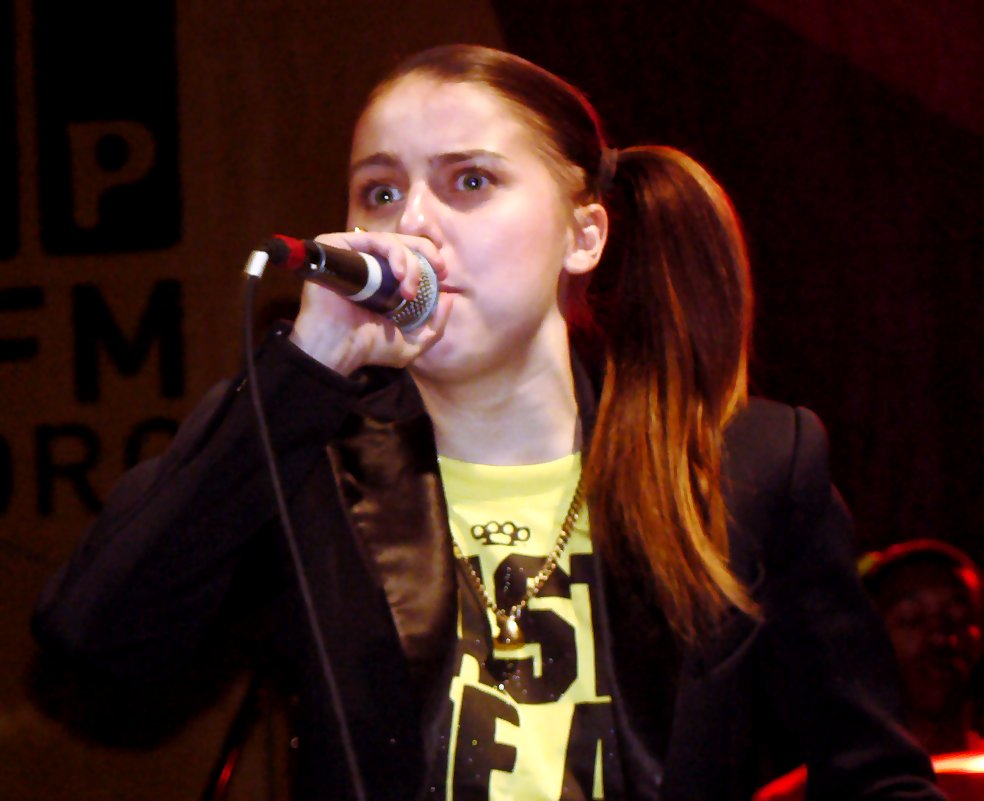
Rapper Lady Sovereign

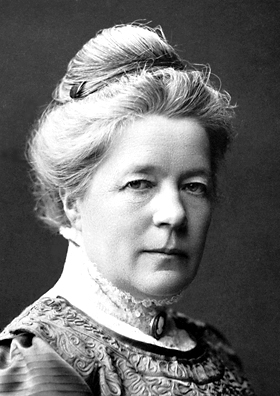
Author Selma Lagerlöf

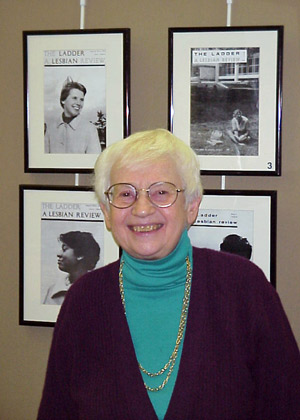
Photojournalist Kay Lahusen

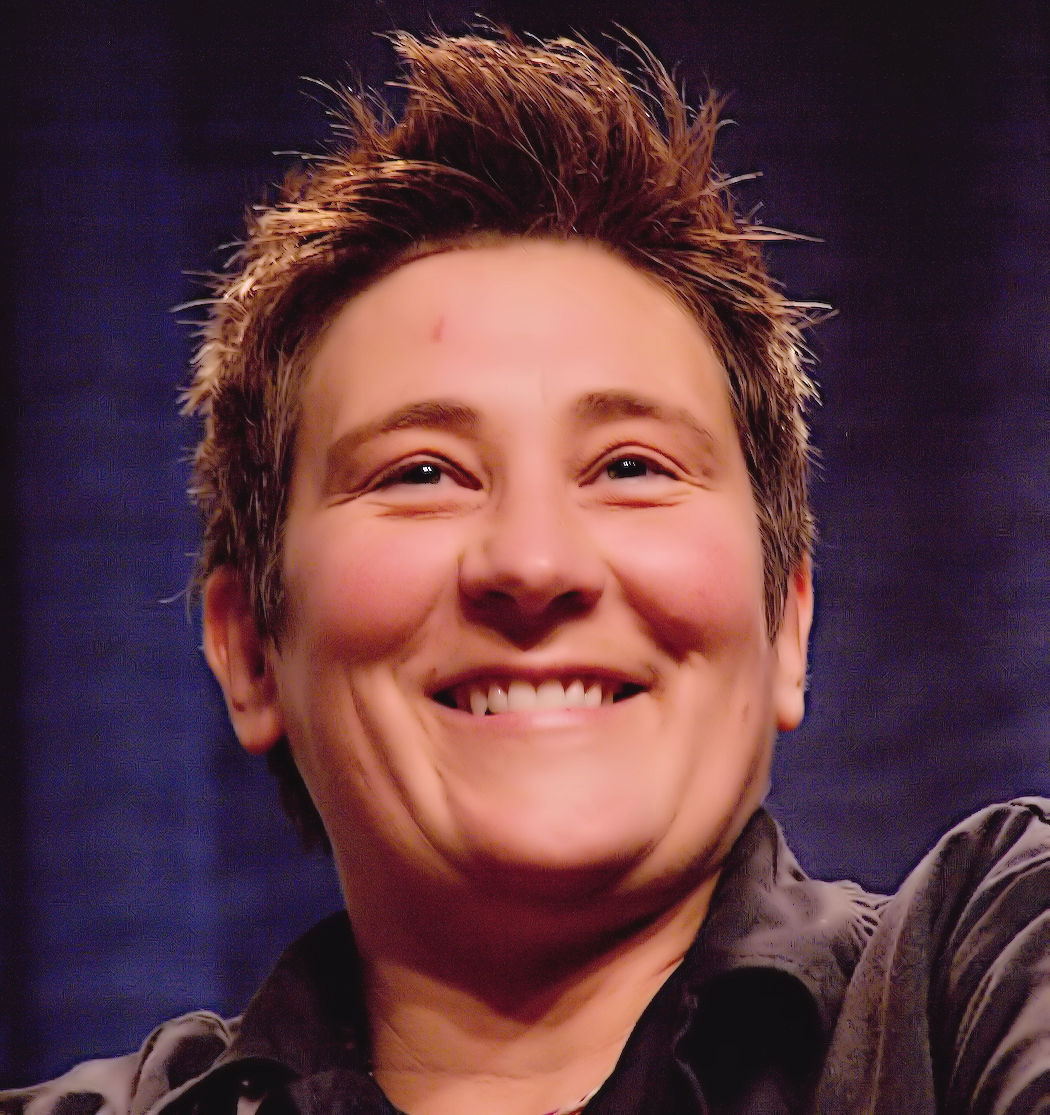
Singer k.d. lang

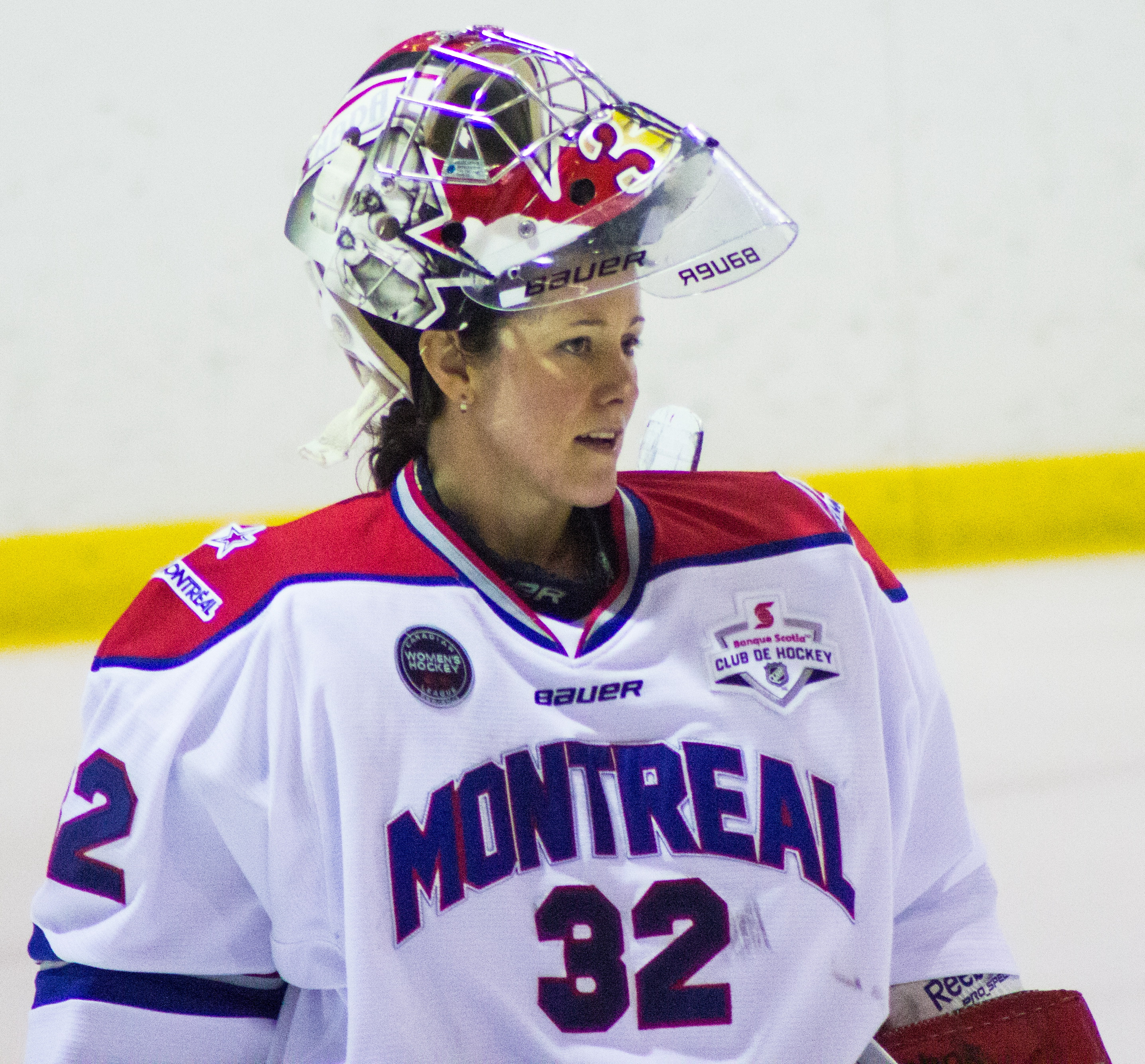
Ice hockey player Charline Labonté

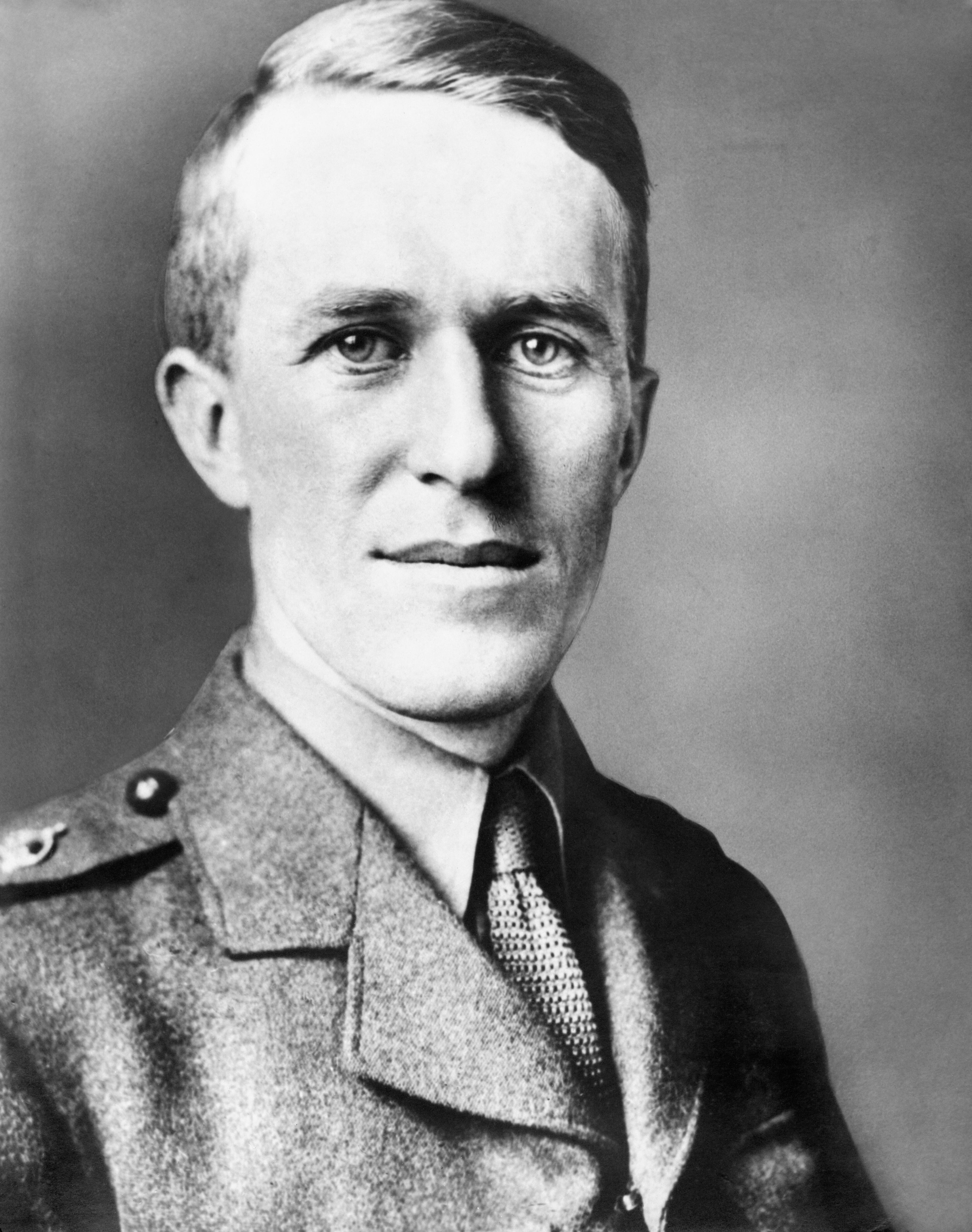
Archaeologist, military officer, diplomat, and writer T. E. Lawrence

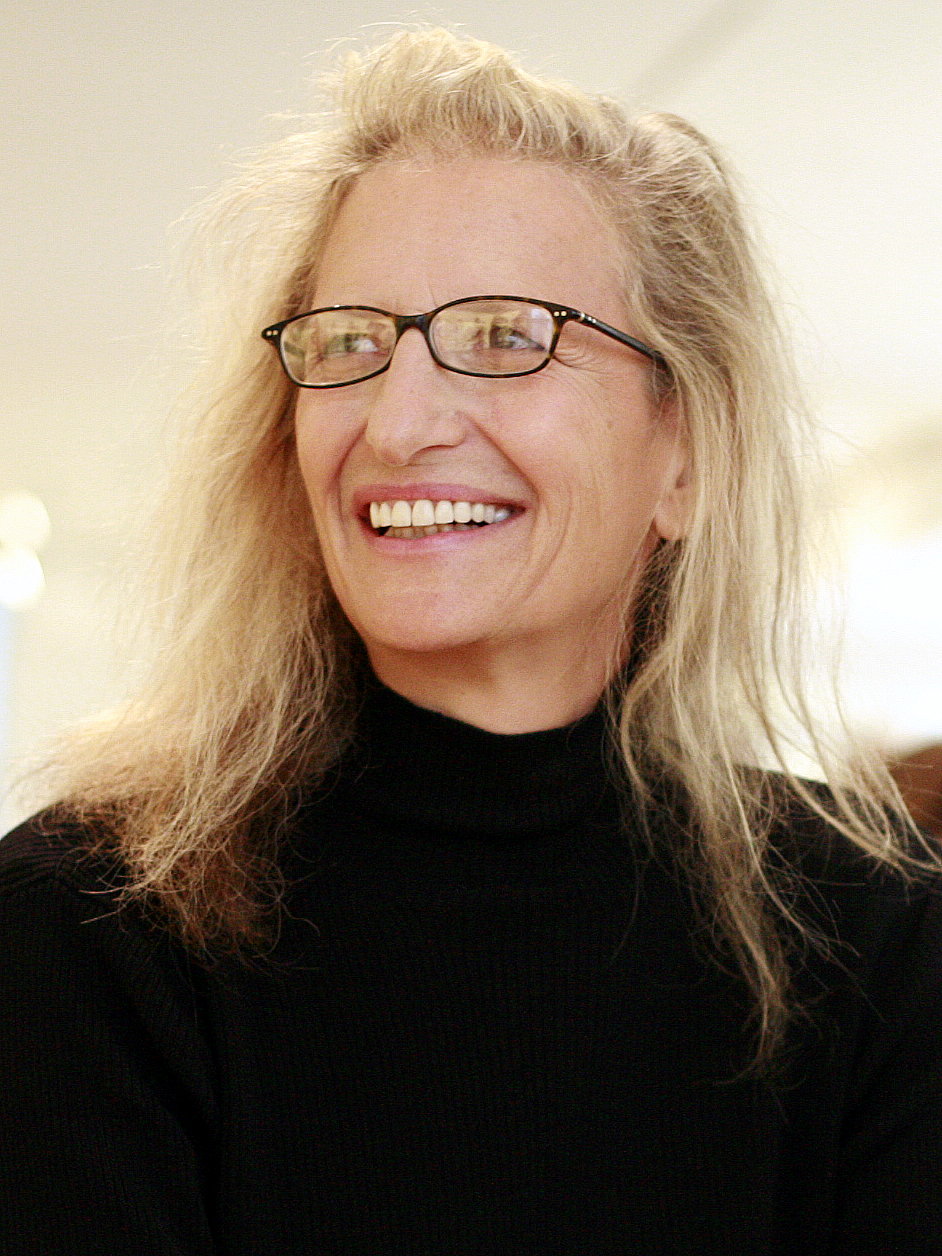
Portrait photographer Annie Leibovitz

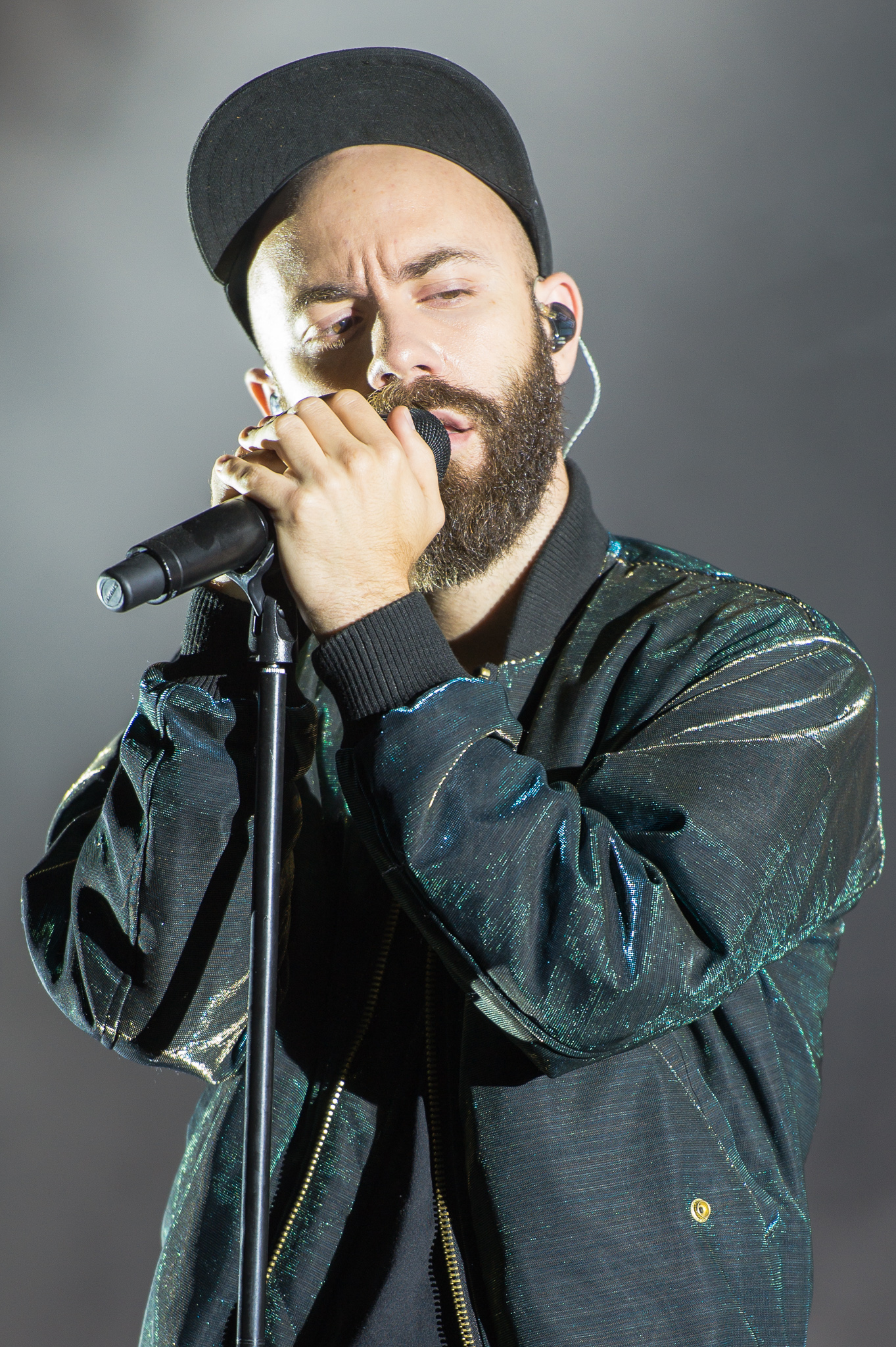
Singer-songwriter Woodkid (Yoann Lemoine)

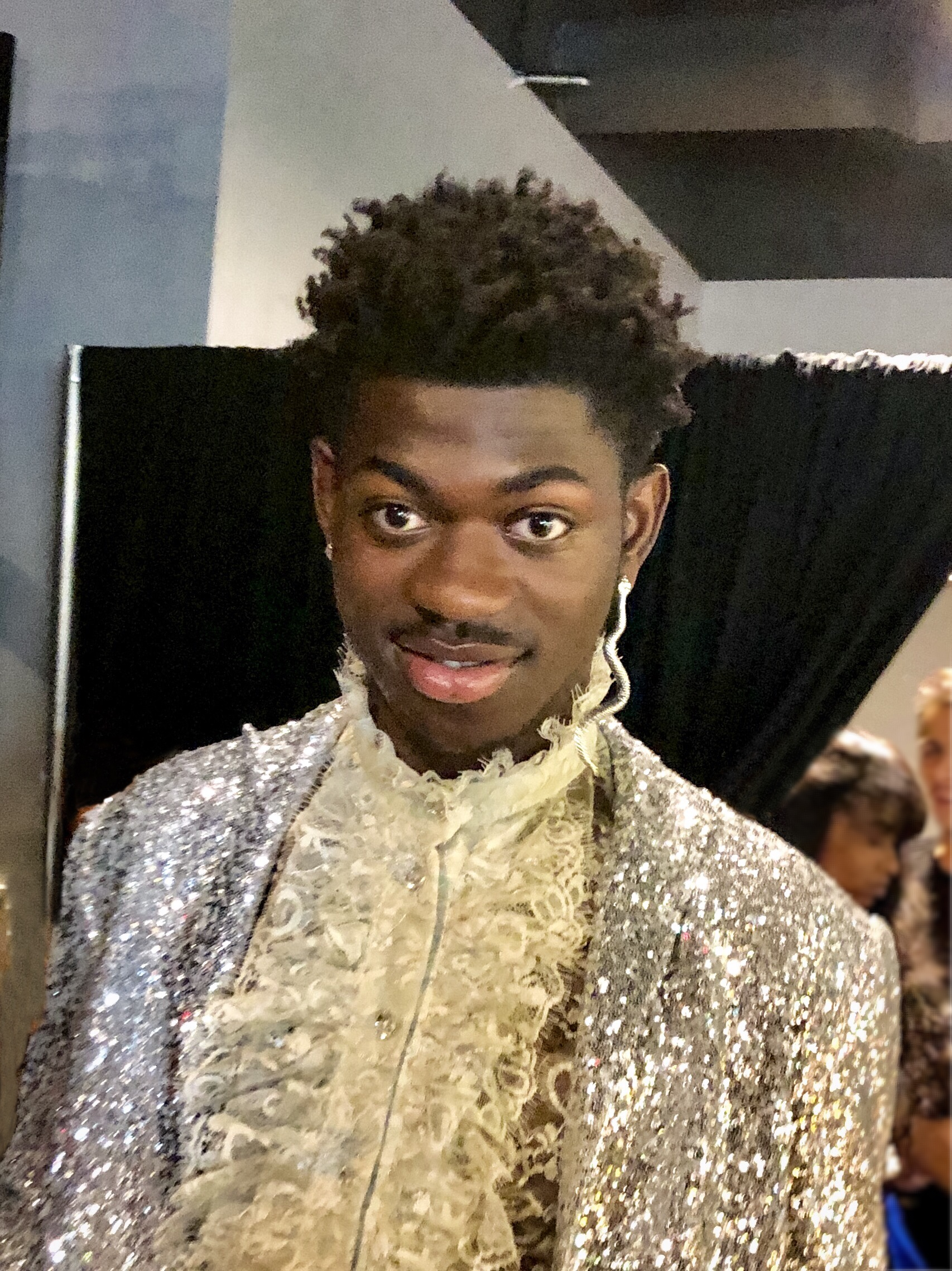
Rapper Lil Nas X

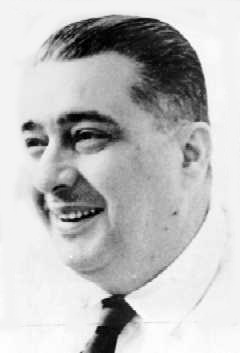
Writer and poet José Lezama Lima

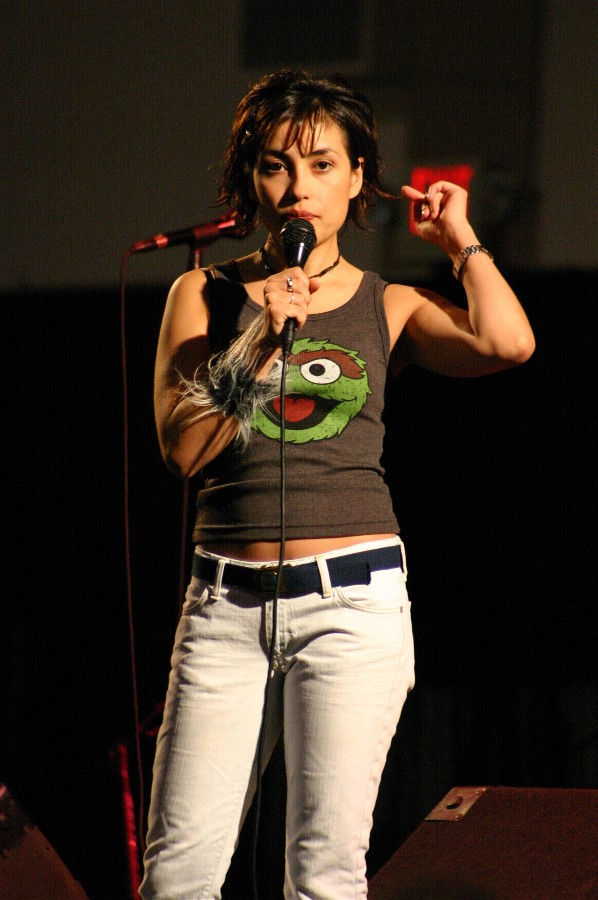
Actress Iyari Limon

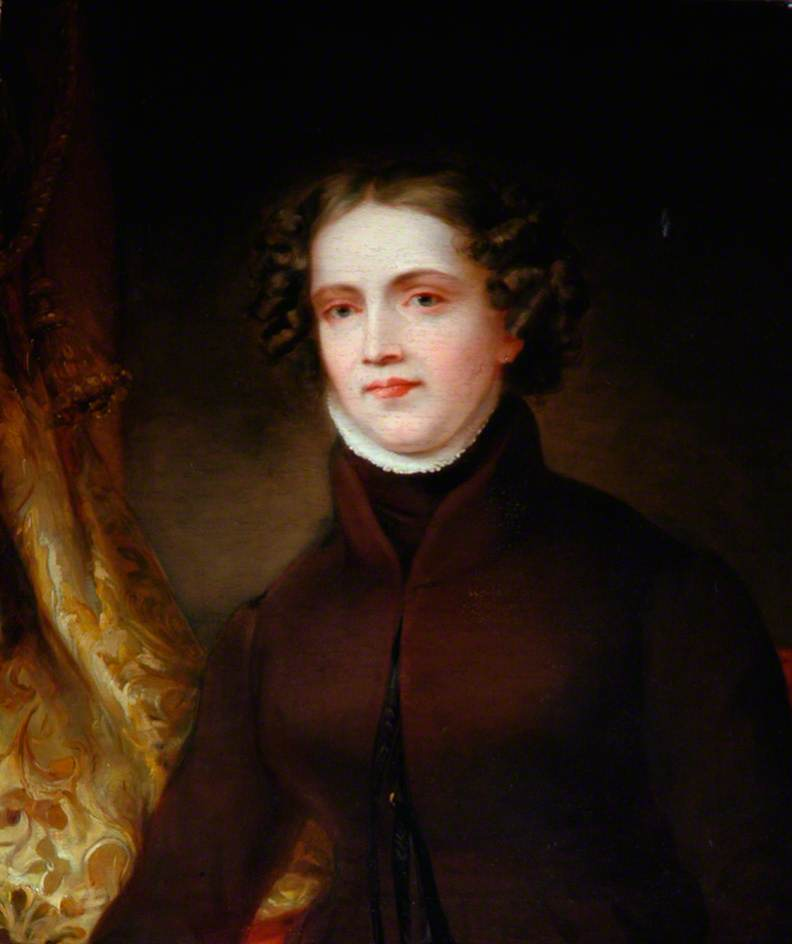
Diarist Anne Lister

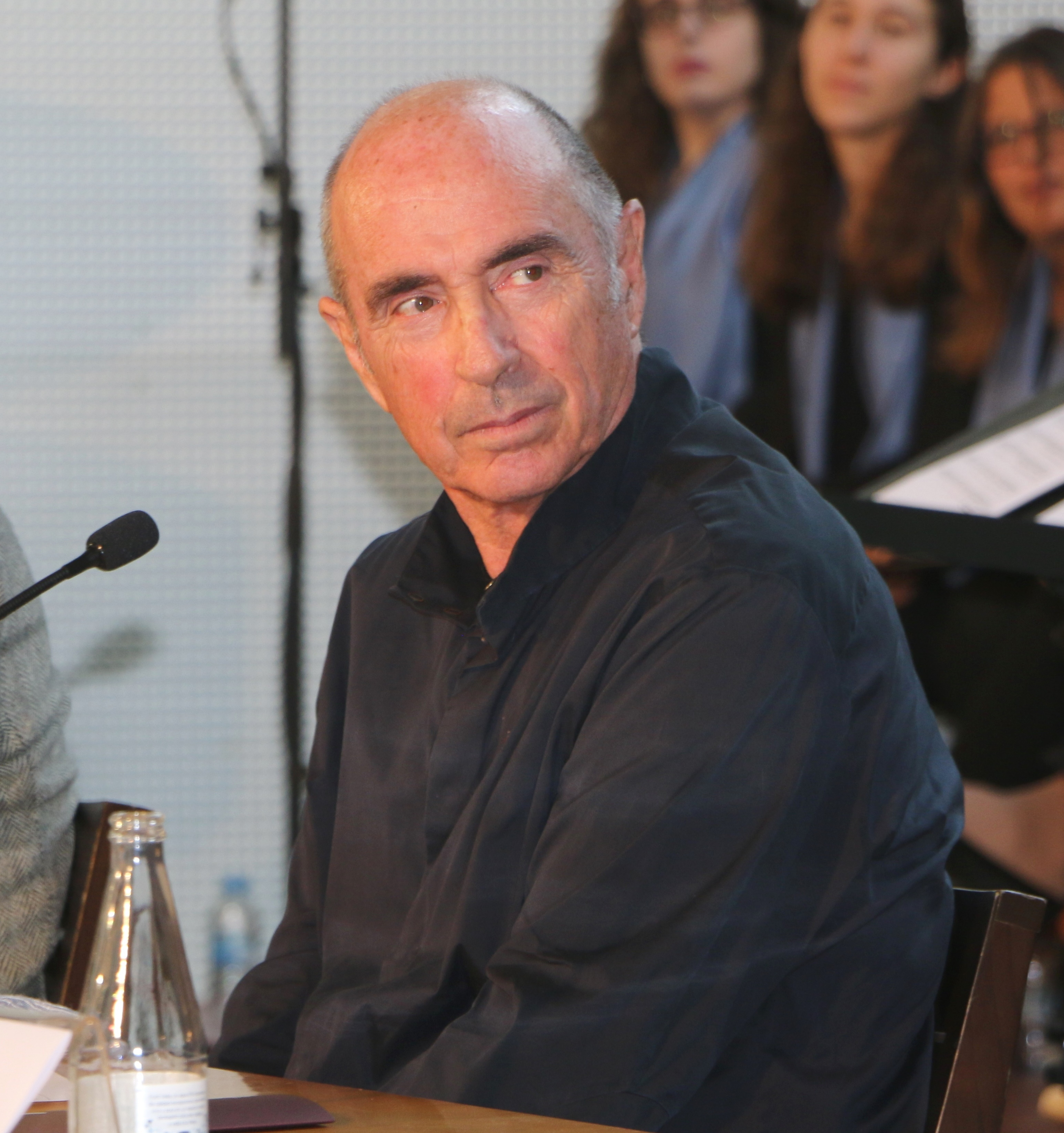
Singer-songwriter, novelist and politician Lluís Llach

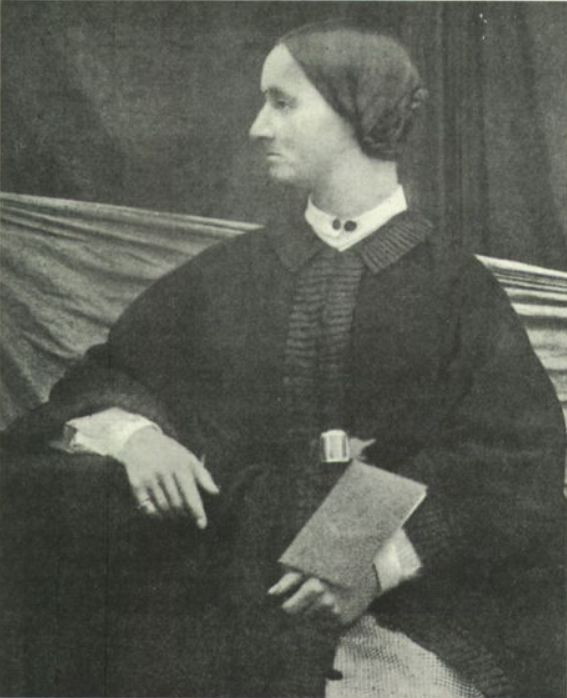
Sculptor, philosopher and animal rights advocate Mary Lloyd

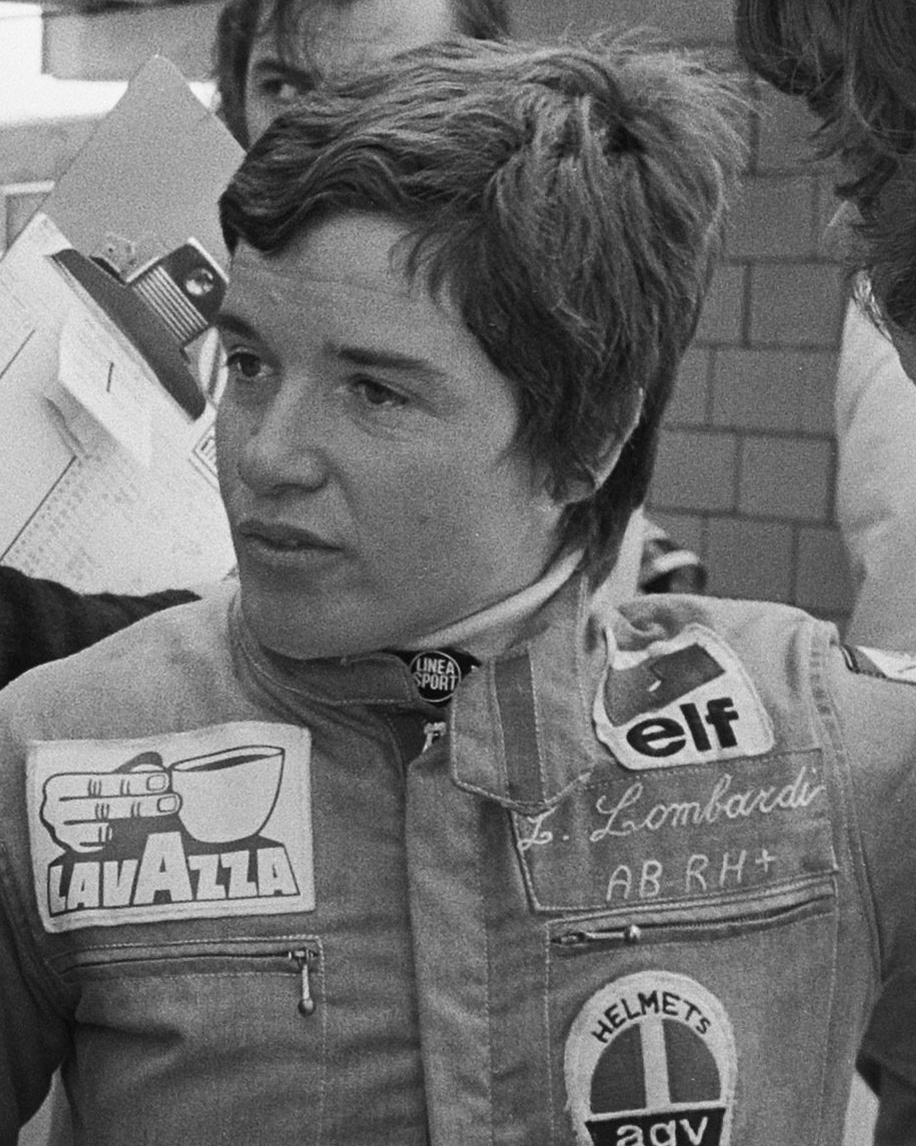
Racing driver Lella Lombardi

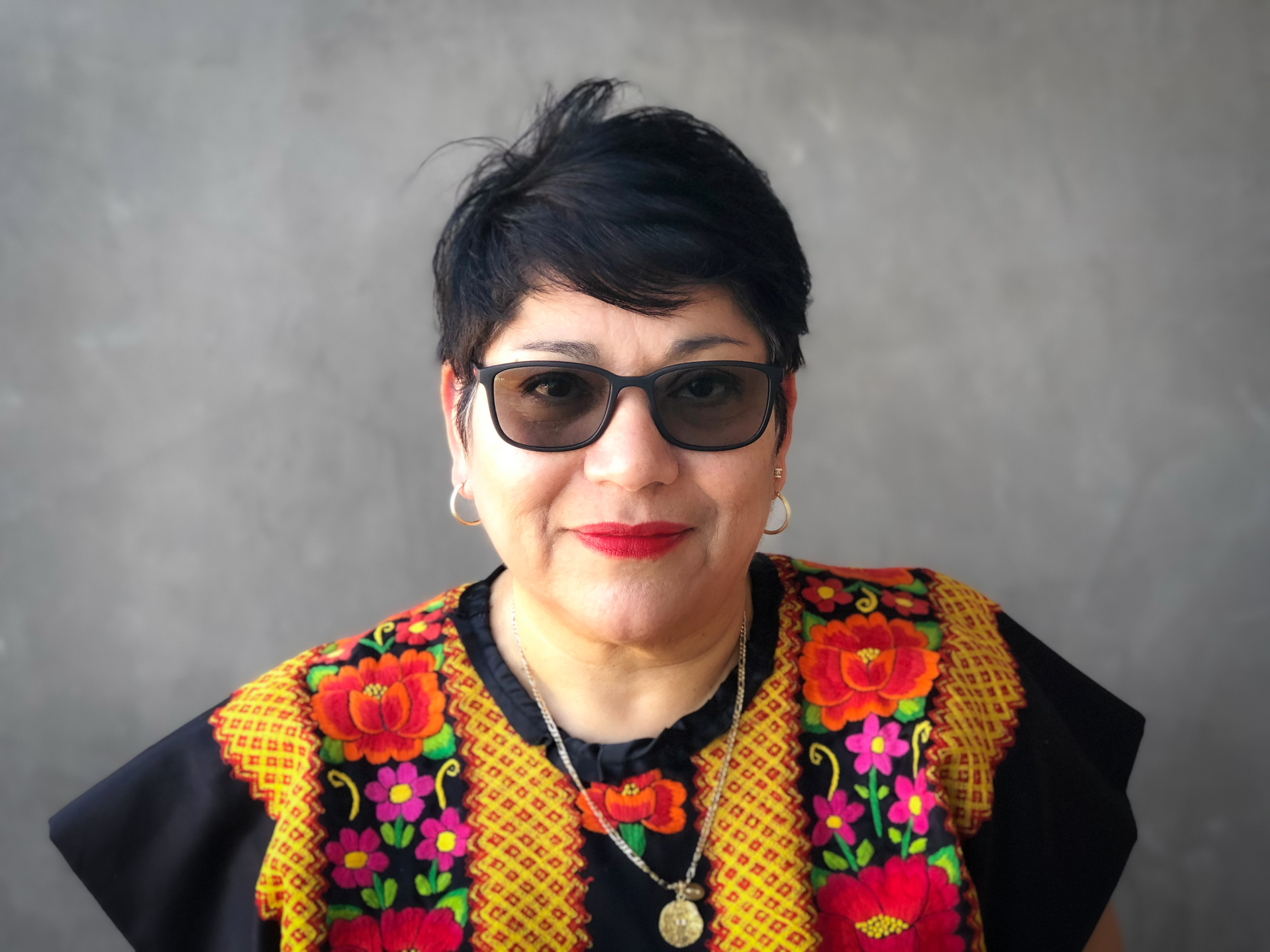
Artist Alma López

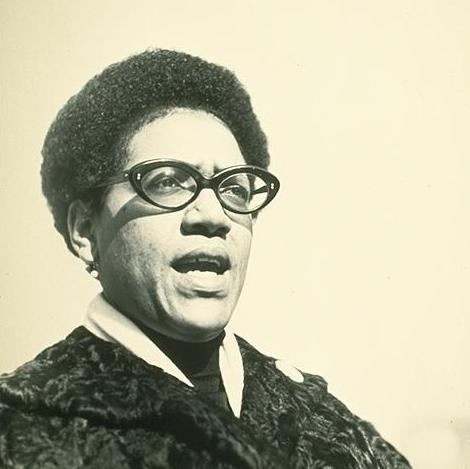
Writer and activist Audre Lorde

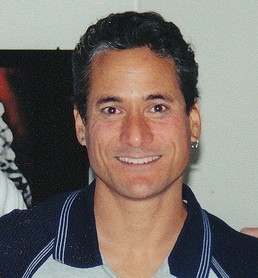
High diver Greg Louganis

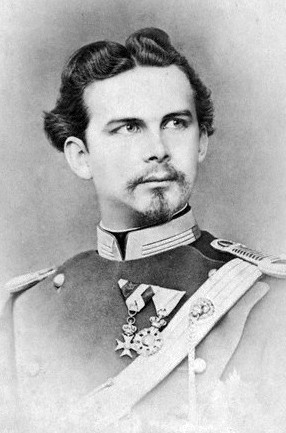
Ludwig II of Bavaria

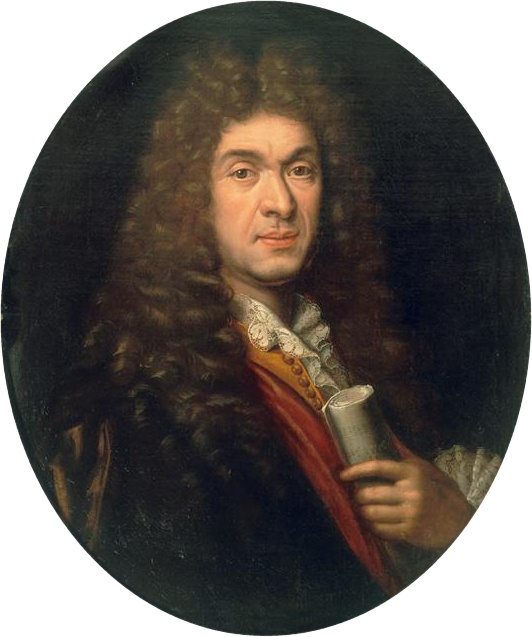
Classical composer Jean-Baptiste Lully

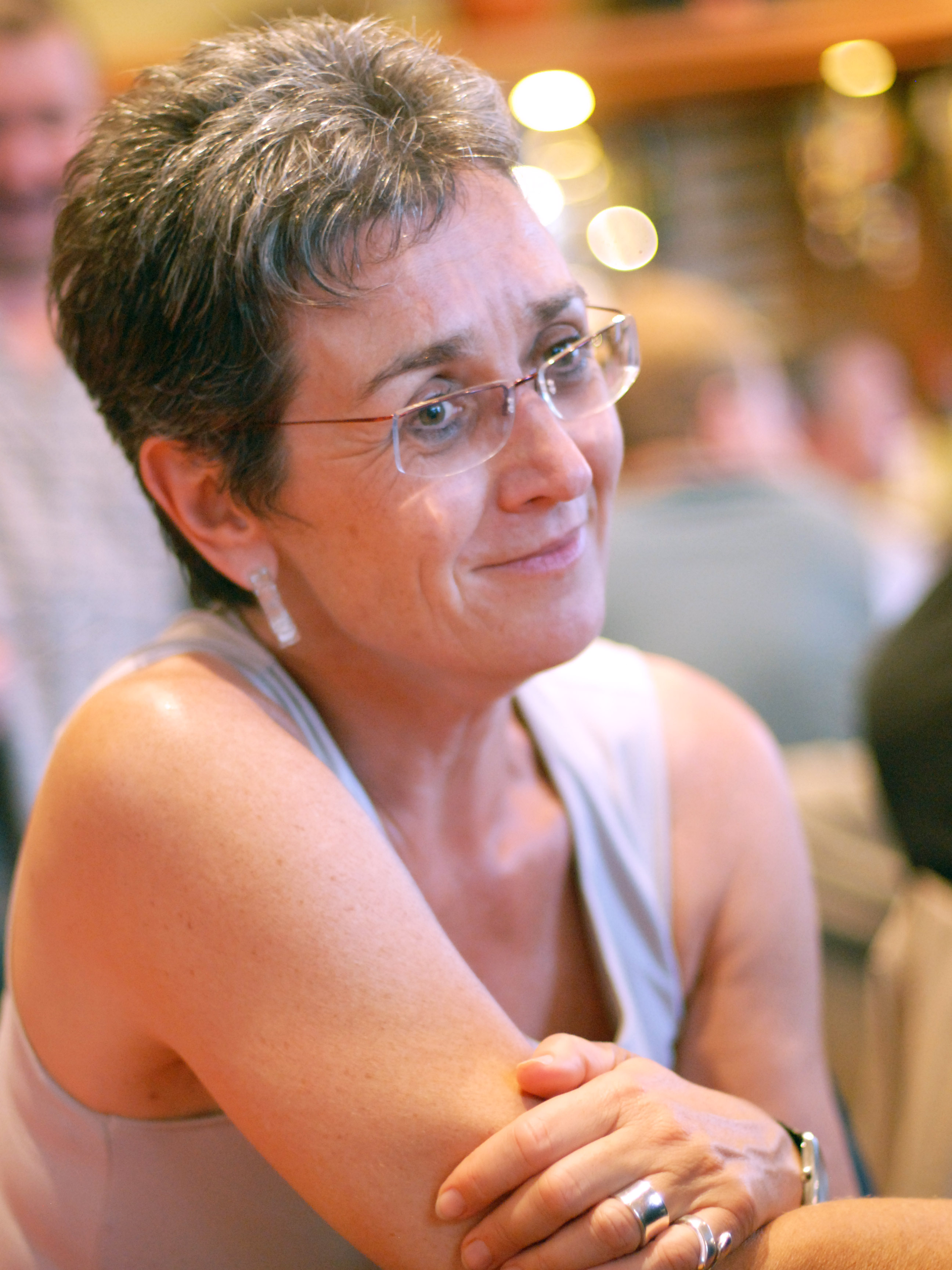
Politician Ulrike Lunacek

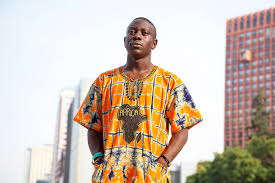
Activist and filmmaker Richard Lusimbo

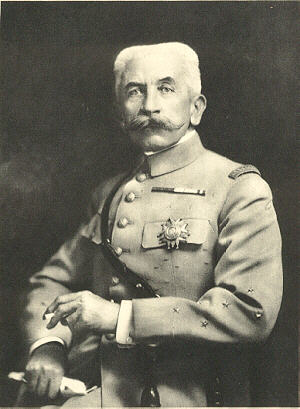
Army general Hubert Lyautey

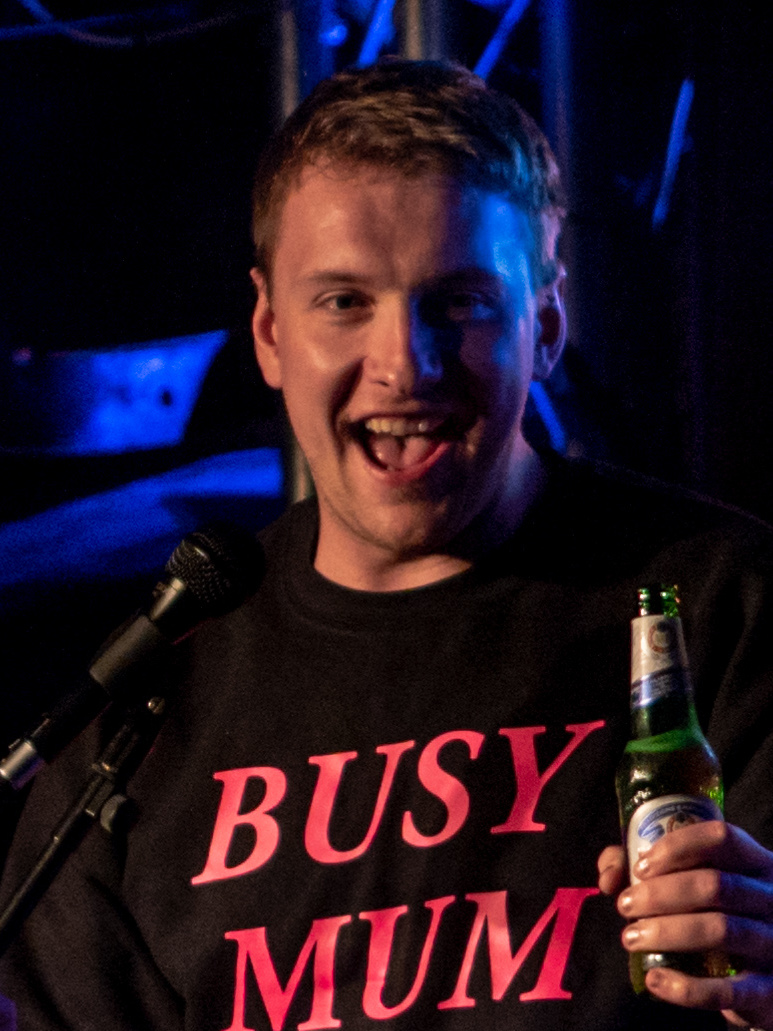
Comedian Joe Lycett

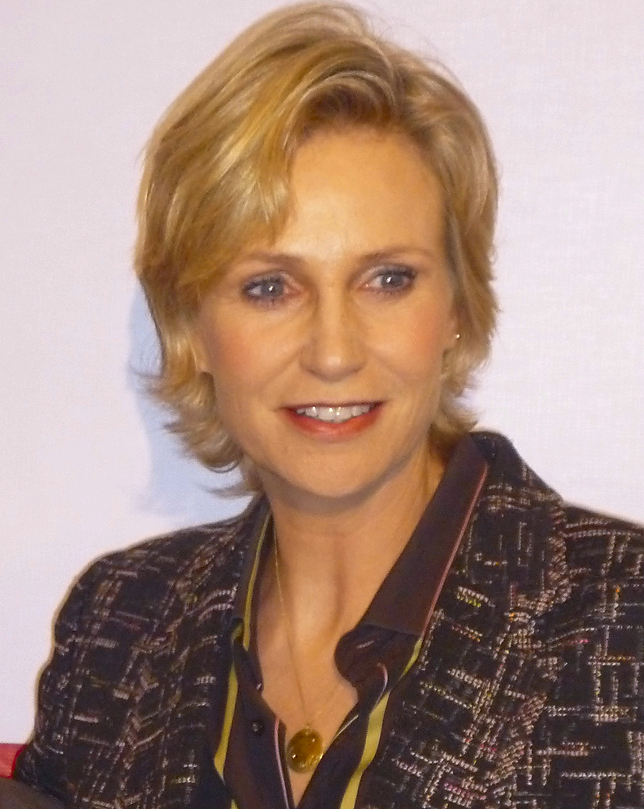
Actress and comedian Jane Lynch

Name	Lifetime	Nationality	Notable as	Notes
Touko Laaksonen (Tom of Finland)	1920–1991	Finnish	Artist	G
Charline Labonté	b. 1982	Canadian	Ice hockey player	L
Bruce LaBruce	b. 1964	Canadian	Filmmaker	G
David LaChapelle	b. 1963	American	Photographer	G
Liz Lachman	b. ?	American	Writer, director, composer	L
Vera Lachmann	1904–1985	German-American	Poet, classicist, educator	L
Stephen Lachs	b. 1939	American	1st openly gay judge appointed in the U.S.	G
Alexandra Lacrabère	b. 1987	French	Handball player	L
Lady Catiria	1959–1999	Puerto Rican	Female impersonator	G
Lady Rhea	b. ?	American	Wiccan high priestess, business owner	L
Lady Sovereign	b. 1985	English	Rapper	L
Carole LaFavor	d. 2011	American	Novelist, AIDS activist	L
Erling Lae	b. 1947	Norwegian	Politician	G
Lawrence La Fountain-Stokes	b. 1968	Puerto Rican	Scholar, short story author	G
Jean-Luc Lagarce	1957–1995	French	Playwright, actor	G
Karl Lagerfeld	1933–2019	German	Fashion designer	G
Selma Lagerlöf	1858–1940	Swedish	Author	L
Ignacio Lago	b. 2002	Argentine	Footballer	G
Dawn Laguens	b. 1964	American	LGBT activist, businesswoman	L
Mohamed Lahouaiej-Bouhlel	1985–2016	Tunisian-French	Terrorist	B
Kay Lahusen	1930–2021	American	Photojournalist	L
Hugh Laing	1911–1988	Barbadian	Dancer	G
John Laird	b. 1950	American	Politician	G
Lili Lakich	b. 1944	American	Artist	L
Andrew Lam	b. 1964	Vietnamese-American	Author	G
Chet Lam	b. 1976	Hong Kong	Pop singer	G
Jade LeMac	b. ?	Canadian	Singer-songwriter	L
Joel Lamangan	b. 1952	Filipino	Director, actor	G
Iñigo Lamarca	b. 1959	Spanish	Lawyer, politician	G
Anna Lambe	b. 2000	Canadian Inuk	Actor	B
Adam Lambert	b. 1982	American	Singer, actor, American Idol Season 8 runner-up	G
Gavin Lambert	1924–2005	English	Screenwriter, novelist	G
Kit Lambert	1935–1981	English	Record producer, record label owner, manager of The Who	G
Mary Lambert	b. 1989	American	Singer-songwriter	L
Vladimir Lambsdorff	1845–1907	Russian	Politician	G
Amy Lamé	b. 1971	American-British	Comedian, radio and TV presenter	L
Nomy Lamm	b. 1975	American	Musician, activist	L
Kim Lammers	b. 1981	Dutch	Field hockey player	L
Friedo Lampe	1899–1945	German	Writer, librarian, editor	G
Jun Lana	b. 1972	Filipino	Filmmaker, writer	G
Rue Landau	b. 1969	American	Politician, activist	L
Christopher Landon	b. 1975	American	Screenwriter	G
Wanda Landowska	1879–1959	Polish-French	Classical harpsichordist	L
Ghislaine Landry	b. 1988	Canadian	Rugby player	L
Jessica Landström	b. 1984	Swedish	Footballer	L
Matteo Lane	b. 1982	American	Comedian	G
Nathan Lane	b. 1956	American	Actor	G
Sasha Lane	b. 1995	American	Actor	L
k.d. lang	b. 1961	Canadian	Singer	L
Johann de Lange	1959–2025	South African	Poet, writer	G
Ruby Rose Langenheim	b. 1986	Australian	MTV VJ	L
Jiří Langer	1894–1943	Czech	Poet	G
Aneta Langerová	b. 1986	Czech	Pop singer, musician	L
Michel Langlois	b. ?	Canadian	Film director, screenwriter	G
Doug Langway	b. ?	American	Film director, screenwriter	G
Michael Lannan	b. ?	American	Screenwriter, producer	G
Tom Lanoye	b. 1958	Belgian	Writer	G
Orlando Lansdorf	1965–2021	Surinamese-Dutch	Drag performer, HIV activist	G
Eyre de Lanux	1894–1996	American	Artist, writer	L
Napoleon Lapathiotis	1888–1933	Greek	Poet	G
Laurier LaPierre	1929–2012	Canadian	Senator, journalist, broadcaster	G
Sheila Lapinsky	b. 1944	South African	Anti-apartheid and LGBTQ+ activist	L
Charles Lapointe	b. 1944	Canadian	Politician, bureaucrat	G
Pierre Lapointe	b. 1981	Canadian	Singer-songwriter	G
Lauren Lappin	b. 1984	American	Softball player	L
Låpsley	b. 1996	English	Singer, songwriter, musician, producer	B
John Lapus	b. 1973	Filipino	TV personality, comedian	G
Ana-Maurine Lara	b. 1975	Dominican-American	Poet, novelist, black feminist scholar	L
Demi Lardner	b. ?	Australian	Absurdist comedian	B
Ricardo Lara	b. 1974	American	Politician	G
Robert Laramée	b. ?	Canadian	Politician	G
Naomi Lareine	b. 1994	Swiss	Singer-songwriter, footballer	L
Storm Large	b. 1969	American	Rock musician, reality show contestant	B
Patty Larkin	b. 1951	American	Singer-songwriter	L
Luis Larraín	b. 1980	Chilean	LGBT rights activist	G
Jack Larson	1928–2015	American	Actor	G
Johanna Larsson	b. 1988	Swedish	Tennis player	L
Chi Chi LaRue	b. 1959	American	Pornographic director	G
Danny La Rue	1927–2009	Irish-British	Entertainer, drag performer	G
Manoly Lascaris	1912–2003	Greek	Lover of author Patrick White	G
Ana Irma Rivera Lassén	b. 1955	Puerto Rican	First openly lesbian (and Afro-Puerto Rican female) President of the Bar Association of Puerto Rico	L
Jef Last	1898–1972	Dutch	Poet, writer, translator, activist	B
Anna Laszuk	1969–2012	Polish	Journalist, activist	L
David Lat	b. 1975	American	Lawyer, author, legal commentator	G
Rob Latham	b. ?	American	Professor, science fiction critic	G
Queen Latifah	b. 1970	American	Rapper, actor	L
Robert La Tourneaux	1940–1986	American	Actor	G
Derek Laud	b. 1964	English	Political activist, reality show contestant	G
Cathrine Laudrup-Dufour	b. 1992	Danish	Dressage rider	L
Charles Laughton	1899–1962	English-American	Actor	G
Duncan Laurence	b. 1994	Dutch	Singer, musician, winner of the Eurovision Song Contest 2019	B
Marie Laurencin	1883–1956	French	Painter, poet, printmaker	B
Arthur Laurents	1917–2011	American	Playwright, novelist, stage director	G
John Lauritsen	1939–2022	American	Historian	G
Jeppe Laursen	b. 1977	Danish	Pop musician (Junior Senior), music producer, songwriter	G
Bryony Lavery	b. 1947	English	Playwright	G
Olof Lavesson	b. 1976	Swedish	Politician	G
Lynn Lavner	b. ?	American	Comedian	L
Mélange Lavonne	b. ?	American	Rapper	L
Anderson Lawler	1902–1959	American	Film and stage actor	G
Mike Lawlor	b. 1956	American	Politician	G
John Geddes Lawrence Jr.	1943–2011	American	Litigant in Lawrence v. Texas case	G
T.E. Lawrence	1888–1935	English	Writer, archaeologist, military officer, diplomat	G
David Laws	b. 1965	English	Politician	G
Marion Lay	b. 1948	Canadian	Swimmer	L
Stephen Laybutt	b. 1977	Australian	Footballer	G
Agustín Lazo Adalid	1896–1971	Mexican	Artist, playwright	G
Chris Lea	b. ?	Canadian	Politician	L
Jeff Leatham	b. 1971	American	Designer	G
David Leavitt	b. 1961	American	Novelist	G
René Leboeuf	b. ?	Canadian	Gay rights activist, half of first same-sex marriage in Canada	G
Jan Lechoń	1889–1956	Polish	Poet, literary and theater critic, diplomat	G
Gerald L'Ecuyer	b. 1959	Canadian	Film and TV director	G
Aneta Lédlová	b. 1996	Czech	Footballer	L
Mark Leduc	1964–2009	Canadian	Boxer	G
Timothy LeDuc	b. 1990	American	Figure skater	G
Violette Leduc	1907–1972	French	Writer	B
Alex Lee	b. 1995	American	California State Assembly's 1st openly bisexual member	B
Blake Lee	b. 1983	American	Actor	G
Bruce George Peter Lee	b. 1960	English	Serial killer	G
Francis Lee	b. 1969	English	Filmmaker, actor	G
Lee Hae-young	b. 1973	South Korean	Film director, screenwriter	G
Iain Lee	b. 1973	English	Broadcaster, comedian	B
Jon Lee	b. 1982	English	Pop singer (S Club 7), actor	G
Justin Lee	b. 1977	American	Founder and Executive Director of Gay Christian Network	G
Maryat Lee	1923–1989	American	Playwright, theatre producer	L
Quentin Lee	b. 1971	Canadian	Filmmaker	G
Rex Lee	b. 1969	American	Actor	G
Sky Lee	b. 1952	Canadian	Writer, artist	L
Mahide Lein	b. 1949	German	LGBT+ activist	L
Leesong Hee-il	b. 1971	South Korean	Film director	G
Paul de Leeuw	b. 1962	Dutch	TV personality, comedian, singer, actor	G
Nicole LeFavour	b. 1964	American	Politician	L
Eva Le Gallienne	1899–1991	British-American	Actor, producer, director, translator, author	L
Krystian Legierski	b. 1978	Polish	Politician	G
Casey Legler	b. 1977	French-American	Swimmer, writer, restaurateur, model	L
Fernand Legros	1931–1983	American	Art director, forger	G
Alisha Lehmann	b. 1999	Swiss	Footballer	L
Sven Lehmann	b. 1979	German	Politician	G
Reichen Lehmkuhl	b. 1973	American	Reality show contestant, actor, model, LGBT rights activist	G
Evy Leibfarth	b. 2004	American	Slalom canoeist	B
Annie Leibovitz	b. 1949	American	Photographer	L
Le1f	b. 1989	American	Rapper, music producer	G
Carol Leifer	b. 1956	American	Comedian	B
Matthew Leifheit	b. 1988	American	Photographer, writer, magazine-editor, publisher, professor	G
Eduardo Leite	b. 1985	Brazilian	Politician, first openly gay governor in Brazil	G
Natalia Leite	b. 1984	Brazilian	Filmmaker, actor	L
Mitchell Leisen	1898–1972	American	Director	G
Phuti Lekoloane	b. 1992	South African	Footballer, LGBT rights activist	G
Leland	b. 1987	American	Singer-songwriter	G
Thierry Le Luron	1952–1986	French	Comedian, entertainer	G
Andy LeMaster	b. ?	American	Singer-songwriter	G
Kevin P. Lembo	b. 1963	American	Politician	G
Pedro Lemebel	1952–2015	Chilean	Writer	G
Julia Lemigova	b. 1972	Russian	Businesswoman, model	L
Marc-Antoine Lemire	b. 1990	Canadian	Film director, screenwriter	G
Yoann Lemoine (Woodkid)	b. 1983	French	Singer-songwriter, musician, music video director, graphic designer	G
Don Lemon	b. 1966	American	News anchor, journalist	G
Tamara de Lempicka	1898–1980	Polish	Painter	B
Barbara Lenk	b. 1950	American	Associate Justice of the Massachusetts Supreme Judicial Court	L
Tom Lenk	b. 1976	American	Actor	G
Jasmine Lennard	b. 1985	English	Model	B
Mark Leno	b. 1951	American	Politician	G
Robert Lentz	b. 1946	American	Iconographer, Franciscan friar	G
Dennis deLeon	1948–2009	American	Human rights lawyer, HIV/AIDS activist, Latino community leader	G
María Pilar León	b. 1995	Spanish	Footballer	L
Zoe Leonard	b. 1961	American	Photographer, visual artist	L
Paco León	b. 1974	Spanish	Actor	B
Vange Leonel	1963–2014	Brazilian	Rock singer, musician (Nau), novelist, playwright, feminist, LGBT activist	L
Russell Leong	b. 1950	American	Academic editor, professor, writer	G
Amy Leong Pang	1908–1989	Trinidadian	Painter	L
José Leonilson	1957–1993	Brazilian	Painter	G
Jónína Leósdóttir	b. 1954	Icelandic	Novelist, playwright, journalist	L
Robert Lepage	b. 1957	Canadian	Playwright, actor, film and stage director	G
Pierre Lepori	b. 1968	Swiss	Writer, translator	G
Leo Lerman	1914–1994	American	Writer, editor	G
Katrina Leskanich	(b. 1960)	American	Singer, musician (Katrina and the Waves)	L
Javicia Leslie	b. 1987	German-American	Actor	B
Phil Lester	b. 1987	English	YouTuber	G
Didier Lestrade	b. 1958	French	Writer, magazine founder, HIV/AIDS and LGBT rights activist	G
Paweł Leszkowicz	b. 1970	Polish	Art historian, art curator	G
Arthur Lett-Haines	1894–1978	English	Painter, sculptor	G
Brian Leung	b. 1964	Hong Kong	Radio presenter	G
Brian Leung	b. ?	American	Writer	G
Joanne Leung	b. ?	Hong Kong	Politician; 1st openly transgender lesbian serving in politics	L
Telly Leung	b. 1980	American	Actor, musician	G
Ivy Levan	b. 1987	American	Musical artist, model	B
Larry Levan	1954–1992	American	DJ	G
Simon LeVay	b. 1943	British-American	Neuroscientist	G
Mark Levengood	b. 1964	Finnish-Swede	Writer, journalist, talk show host	G
Malin Levenstad	b. 1988	Swedish	Footballer	L
Harvey Levin	b. 1950	American	Producer, lawyer	G
Saul Levin	b. ?	South African	Psychiatrist	G
David Levithan	b. 1972	American	Writer	G
Ariel Levy	b. 1974	American	Writer	L
Dan Levy	b. 1983	Canadian	Actor, screenwriter, producer	G
Judith Ellen Levy	b. 1958	American	Judge of the U.S. District Court	L
William Alexander Levy	1909–1997	American	Architect	G
Steve Lew	b. 1958	American	Community organizer, LGBT rights and AIDS activist	G
Ben Lewis	b. 1985	Canadian	Actor	G
Davante Lewis	b. ?	American	1st (African American) LGBT person elected to office in Louisiana	G
Jeff Lewis	b. 1970	American	Real estate speculator, interior designer, TV personality	G
Lisa-Jayne Lewis	b. 1977	English	Christian broadcaster, commentator	B
Zoë Lewis	b. ?	English	Folk musician	L
Frank Xavier Leyendecker	1876–1924	American	Illustrator	G
J. C. Leyendecker	1871–1951	American	Illustrator	G
Amandine Leynaud	b. 1986	French	Handball player	L
Danell Leyva	b. 1991	Cuban-American	Gymnast	B
Li Shiu Tong	1907–1993	Chinese	Sexologist, LGBT activist	G
Li Tingting	b. 1989	Chinese	Campaigner, activist	L
Li Yijiang	1980–2004	Chinese	Serial killer	G
Li Ying	b. 1993	Chinese	Footballer	L
Li Zhanguo	1969–1995	Chinese	Serial killer	G
Liang Ji	d. 159	Chinese (Han Dynasty)	General	B
Liberace	1919–1987	American	Classical/pop musician	G
Mitchell Lichtenstein	b. 1956	American	Actor, writer, director	G
Ivri Lider	b. 1974	Israeli	Rock musician (The Young Professionals)	G
Eli Lieb	b. 1979	American	Musician	G
Ali Liebegott	b. 1971	American	Writer	L
Gabe Liedman	b. ?	American	Writer, producer, actor	G
Sébastien Lifshitz	b. 1968	French	Film director, screenwriter	G
Sebastián Ligarde	b. 1954	American-Mexican	Actor, acting coach	G
Lori Lightfoot	b. 1962	American	Politician, Mayor of Chicago	L
Glenn Ligon	b. 1960	American	Artist	G
Marko Liias	b. 1981	American	Politician	G
Lil Nas X	b. 1999	American	Rapper, singer, songwriter	G
Lil Peep	1996–2017	American	Rapper, singer	B
Madeleine Lim	b. 1964	Singaporean-American	Filmmaker, producer, director, cinematographer, LGBTQ activist	L
José Lezama Lima	1910–1976	Cuban	Poet	G
Marina Lima	b. 1955	Brazilian	Singer-songwriter	B
Silvana Lima	b. 1984	Brazilian	Surfer	L
Limahl	b. 1958	English	Pop singer (Kajagoogoo)	G
Iyari Limon	b. 1976	American	Actor	B
Lin Hwai-min	b. 1947	Taiwanese	Dancer, writer, choreographer, theater founder/director	G
Orna Lin	b. 1956	Israeli	Lawyer	L
Elena Linari	b. 1994	Italian	Footballer	L
Hedvig Lindahl	b. 1983	Swedish	Footballer	L
Ylva Lindberg	b. 1976	Swedish	Ice hockey player	L
Erika Linder	b. 1990	Swedish	Model, actor	L
Virginia Linder	b. 1953	American	Judge	L
Åsa Lindhagen	b. 1980	Swedish	Politician	B
Thure Lindhardt	b. 1974	Danish	Actor	G
Katharina Lindner	1979–2019	German	Footballer, academic	L
Patrick Lindner	b. 1960	German	Volksmusik singer	G
Lori Lindsey	b. 1980	American	Soccer player	L
Duke Ling of Wei	534–493 BC	Chinese (Wei)	Head of state	B
Anne Linnet	b. 1953	Danish	Singer-songwriter, musician	B
Hannu Lintu	b. 1967	Finnish	Conductor	G
Lisa M	b. 1974	Puerto Rican	Rapper, DJ	L
Blaise Godbe Lipman	b. 1988 or 1989	American	Actor, director	G
Paul Lisicky	b. 1959	American	Writer	G
Herbert List	1903–1975	German	Photographer	G
Anne Lister	1791–1840	English	Diarist	L
Corny Littmann	b. 1952	German	Entrepreneur, entertainer, theater owner, football official	G
Timothy Liu	b. 1965	American	Poet, writer	G
Ari-Pekka Liukkonen	b. 1989	Finnish	Swimmer	G
Reg Livermore	b. 1938	Australian	Actor	G
Spencer Livermore	b. 1975	English	Politician	G
Lluís Llach	b. 1948	Spanish	Singer, songwriter, novelist	G
Jose Llana	b. 1976	American	Actor and singer	G
Matt Llano	b. 1988	American	Long distance runner	G
Diego Llorico	b. 1971	Filipino	Actor, comedian	G
Mary Lloyd	1819–1896	Welsh	Sculptor, philosopher, animal rights advocate	L
Phyllida Lloyd	b. 1957	English	Theatre director	L
Anita Lo	b. 1965	American	Chef, restaurateur	L
Malinda Lo	b. ?	American	Young adult novelist	L
Tove Lo	b. 1987	Swedish	Singer-songwriter	B
Carlos Lobo de Ávila	1860–1895	Portuguese	Academic, writer, journalist, politician	G
Alain LeRoy Locke	1886–1954	American	Writer, philosopher, African American studies educator	G
Joe Locke	b. 2003	Manx	Actor	G
Ollie Locke	b. 1987	English	Reality TV personality	B
Sean Paul Lockhart	b. 1986	American	Actor, director	G
Annea Lockwood	b. 1939	New Zealand	Contemporary classical composer	L
Joseph Lockwood	1904–1991	English	Industrialist, businessman	G
Hans Lodeizen	1924–1950	Dutch	Poet	G
Chloe Logarzo	b. 1994	Australian	Footballer	L
Brad Loekle	b. 1978	American	Comedian	G
Frederick Loewe	1901–1988	Austrian-American	Musical theater composer	G
George Logan	1944–2023	Scottish	Actor, comedian	G
John Logan	b. 1961	American	Writer	G
Jan Logie	b. 1969	New Zealand	Politician	L
Kristanna Loken	b. 1979	American	Actor	B
Lindsay Lohan	b. 1986	American	Actor, singer	B
Joanna Lohman	b. 1982	American	Soccer player	L
Lella Lombardi	1941–1992	Italian	Racing driver	L
Bjørn Lomborg	b. 1965	Danish	Environmentalist, author	G
Roy London	1943–1993	American	Actor, acting coach, teacher	G
Stacy London	b. 1969	American	Stylist, fashion consultant, author, magazine editor	B
James Loney	b. 1964	Canadian	Peace activist	G
Robert Long	1943–2006	Dutch	Musician, TV presenter	G
James Longman	b. 1986	English	Journalist, foreign correspondent	G
Joe Longthorne	1955–2019	English	Singer, impressionist	G
Keiynan Lonsdale	b. 1991	Australian	Actor	B
Ellen Joyce Loo	1986–2018	Canadian-Hong Kong	Pop musician (at17)	L
Loo Zihan	b. 1983	Singaporean	Actor, film director, artist	G
Rebecca Loos	b. 1977	Dutch	Glamour model	B
Arlindo Lopes	b. 1979	Brazilian	Actor	G
Alma López	b. 1966	Mexican	Artist	L
Claudia López	b. 1970	Colombian	Politician, first female and openly gay mayor of Bogotá	L
Frédéric Lopez	b. 1967	French	TV presenter	G
Leon Lopez	b. 1979	British	Actor, director, singer-songwriter	G
Margarita López	b. ?	Puerto Rican-American	Politician and activist	L
Matthew Lopez	b. 1977	American	Playwright, screenwriter	G
Raymond Lopez	b. 1978	American	Politician; 1st openly gay Mexican-American to be elected in Illinois	G
Jason Lorber	b. 1966	American	Politician	G
Eda Lord	1907–1976	American	Writer	L
Audre Lorde	1934–1992	American	Writer, activist	L
Max Lorenz	1901–1975	German	Opera singer	G
Kena Lorenzini	b. 1959	Chilean	Photographer, politician, psychologist, writer	L
Frances Loring	1887–1968	American	Sculptor	L
Lance Loud	1951–2001	American	Reality TV personality, rock musician (Mumps)	G
Greg Louganis	b. 1960	American	Olympic high-diver	G
Louis I of Spain	1707–1724	Spanish	King of Spain	B
David Lourea	1945–1992	American	Writer, AIDS and bisexual rights activist	B
Cindi Love	b. ?	American	Christian minister, activist	L
Donja R. Love	b. ?	American	Playwright	G
Kermit Love	1916–2008	American	Costume designer, muppet designer/builder	G
Susan Love	1948–2023	American	Surgeon, breast cancer expert, author	L
Jon Lovett	b. 1982	American	Speechwriter	G
Jonathan Lovitz	b. 1984	American	LGBT rights advocate, actor	G
Evan Low	b. 1983	American	Politician	G
Adam Lowe	b. 1985	British	Writer, performer, publisher	G
Lowell	b. 1991	Canadian	Electropop singer-songwriter	B
Amy Lowell	1874–1925	American	Poet	L
Jewell Loyd	b. 1993	American	Basketball player	L
Bruno Lozano	b. ?	American	Politician	G
Angélica Lozano Correa	b. 1975	Colombian	Lawyer, politician, activist	L
Kelsey Lu	b. 1989	American	Singer, cellist	B
Sharon Lubinski	b. ?	American	United States Marshal	L
Craig Lucas	b. 1951	American	Playwright, theatre and film director	G
Matt Lucas	b. 1974	English	Comedian, actor, writer	G
Michael Lucas	b. 1972	Russian-Israeli-American	Pornographic actor, director	G
Ed Luce	b. ?	American	Cartoonist	G
Jeremy Lucido	b. 1977	American	Artist, blogger, photographer, zine publisher, film director	G
Luigi Lucioni	1900–1988	Italian-American	Painter	G
Charles Ludlam	1943–1987	American	Actor, director, playwright	G
Ludmilla	b. 1995	Brazilian	Singer-songwriter	B
Ludwig II of Bavaria	1845–1886	German-Bavarian	King of Bavaria	G
Attila Richard Lukacs	b. 1962	Canadian	Artist	G
Kaili Lukan	b. 1994	Canadian	Rugby sevens player	L
Jean-Baptiste Lully	1632–1687	French	Classical composer	B
Ulrike Lunacek	b. 1957	Austrian	Politician	L
Lydia Lunch	b. 1959	American	Rock musician, poet, writer, actor	B
Mark Lund	b. 1965	American	Writer, figure skating analyst	G
Torben Lund	b. 1950	Danish	Politician	G
Andreas Lundstedt	b. 1972	Swedish	Pop musician (Alcazar)	G
Billy Lunn	b. ?	English	Singer (The Subways)	B
Krystian Lupa	b. 1943	Polish	Theatre director	G
Michael Lupo	1953–1995	Italian	Serial killer	G
Richard Lusimbo	b. 1987	Ugandan	LGBT activist, documentary filmmaker	G
Ozzy Lusth	b. 1981	Mexican-American	Reality TV personality	B
Billy Luther	b. ?	American	Director, filmmaker	G
Steven Lutvak	1959–2023	American	Musician, composer	G
Venla Luukkonen	b. 1984	Finnish	Brazilian jiu-jitsu competitor and instructor	L
Manila Luzon	b. ?	American	Drag performer, recording artist, comedian	G
John Lwin	b. 1967	Burmese	Model, model agency founder, event organizer, LGBT rights activist	G
Billy Lyall	1953–1989	Scottish	Pop musician (Pilot, Bay City Rollers)	G
Hubert Lyautey	1854–1934	French	Army general, colonial administrator	G
Joe Lycett	b. 1988	English	Comedian	B
Joey Lye	b. 1987	Canadian	Softball player	L
Euros Lyn	b. 1971	Welsh	Director	G
Alfred Lynch	1931–2003	English	Actor	G
Bernárd J. Lynch	b. 1947	Irish	Catholic priest, psychotherapist, HIV/AIDS activist	G
Jane Lynch	b. 1960	American	Actor	L
Laurie Lynd	b. 1959	Canadian	Film and TV director	G
Paul Lynde	1926–1982	American	Actor, comedian, game show personality	G
George Platt Lynes	1907–1955	American	Photographer	G
Logan Lynn	b. 1979	American	Singer-songwriter, activist, writer, producer, filmmaker	G
Phyllis Lyon	1924–2020	American	Feminist and LGBT-rights activist	L
John Lyons	b. 1977	Irish	One of the 1st openly gay members of Dáil Éireann.	G

== See also ==
- List of gay, lesbian or bisexual people
