= FAAP =

FAAP may refer to:

- Fellow in the American Academy of Pediatrics
- Fundação Armando Alvares Penteado, Brazil
- Federation of Accrediting Agencies of the Philippines
