= Armando Álvares Penteado =

Brazilian architect (1884–1947)

- Born: October 31, 1884; Santa Cruz das Palmeiras, São Paulo, Empire of Brazil
- Died: January 27, 1947 (aged 62); São Paulo, São Paulo, Brazil
- Burial place: Cemitério da Consolação
- Education: Polytechnic School of São Paulo
- Occupations: Businessman, landowner, architect

Armando Álvares Penteado (October 31, 1884 – January 27, 1947) was a Brazilian architect, coffee baron, and patron of art.

Born into a wealthy family of landowners, the son of a count, Penteado studied in Paris and London before enrolling at the Polytechnic School of São Paulo, from which he graduated. He was married to Annie Álvares Penteado (née Alwis), with whom he shared the project of establishing an educational instutiton dedicated to the arts, which was only realized after his death with the private institution Fundação Armando Alvares Penteado, founded from his estate.

The so-called Vila Penteado, an Art Nouveau-style manor that belonged to him, was donated to the Faculty of Architecture and Urbanism of the University of São Paulo.
