= Bruno Lozano =

American politician

Mayor of Del Rio, Texas
- In office 2018–2022
- Preceded by: Robert Garza
- Succeeded by: Alvaro Arreola

Personal details
- Born: 1983 (age 42–43) Del Rio, Texas
- Party: Democratic

Bruno Lozano (born 1983) is an American politician, United States Air Force veteran, and flight attendant. He served as the mayor of Del Rio, Texas, from May 2018 through June 2022 after he defeated incumbent Robert Garza in the general election.

== Early life ==
Lozano was born in Del Rio, Texas in 1983. He served as a security forces patrolman in the United States Air Force. While serving under 'Don't Ask, Don't Tell," Lozano was stationed at Shaw Air Force Base, South Carolina and deployed to Ali Al Salem Air Base, Kuwait. Upon completing his military contract, Lozano moved to Chicago, Illinois. He began his airline career at SkyWest Airlines in 2007. He was hired at Delta Air Lines in 2014.

== Political career ==
Lozano prioritized efforts to clean up the San Felipe Creek (Texas) and volunteer at local non-profits. According to Lozano, he decided to enter political life in 2016, supported and encouraged by his former high school classmates during a class reunion event. He was critical of the city's economic policies, which he says left the local economy stagnant even as neighboring cities boomed. He called on Millennial voters to break Baby Boomers' hold on local political power.

A Democrat, he ran against incumbent Mayor Robert Garza on a May 5, 2018 election, and won in a landslide, receiving 62% of the votes. A later recount confirmed the result.

His victory received attention in The Huffington Post and the national LGBT press, which highlighted both his military career and his flamboyant image.

Mayor Lozano is highly influential within Del Rio and a key figure within the Middle Rio Grande area. On August 26, 2020, Mayor Lozano was nominated and appointed as Third Vice President on the Middle Rio Grande Development Council, which represents multiple counties and cities within the Middle Rio Grande Region.

Lozano is committed to economic growth by enhancing international trade via transportation within the Del Rio and Middle Rio Grande Region. Lozano was appointed as Segment 3 Chairman to represent the Segment 3 portion of the Ports-to-Plains feasibility study under Texas House Bill 1079. Under his leadership, Lozano has worked alongside other mayors and judges within the Val Verde County, Texas, Maverick County, Texas, and Webb County, Texas to prioritize the current and future needs for an interstate grade level structure serving the port of entries. Mayor Lozano also served on the Ports-to-Plains Advisory Committee that was chaired by Mayor Dan Pope of Lubbock, Texas.

Laughlin Air Force Base, a vital employer in Del Rio, Texas, is a top priority for Lozano. He represented the City of Del Rio, and Laughlin AFB at The Pentagon during a Washington, D.C. municipal delegation visit in May, 2018 where he prioritized mission support, base housing, and quality of life improvements for airmen. Lozano has also relayed local concerns regarding the rise in unlawful border crossings during his term in office. Visits with United States Department of Homeland Security and media outreach have been crucial during the immigration crisis. Spanning two presidential terms, Lozano has advocated for municipal support and for a more transparent response from the federal government during the ongoing border crisis.

== LGBTQI+ achievements ==
Lozano currently (2021) serves as president for Del Rio SAFE (Sexual Advocacy For Everyone), a local LGBTQI+ non-profit. Lozano has been featured on multiple news outlets due to his landslide win as the first openly gay elected official in Del Rio. Zoe Saldaña featured Lozano in a mini documentary series on Great Big Story. He was also featured on Topic, an “entertaining and storytelling studio” from First Look Media. The short documentary follows Lozano shortly after his landslide win in 2018. He can be heard giving a keynote speech in front of a crowd at Eagle Pass, Texas Pride 2018. In 2021 Lozano performed in drag on HBO's We're Here alongside his drag mother Shangela when the show came to Del Rio.
