= Fundação Armando Álvares Penteado =

Brazilian academic institution

Armando Álvares Penteado Foundation
- Fundação Armando Álvares Penteado
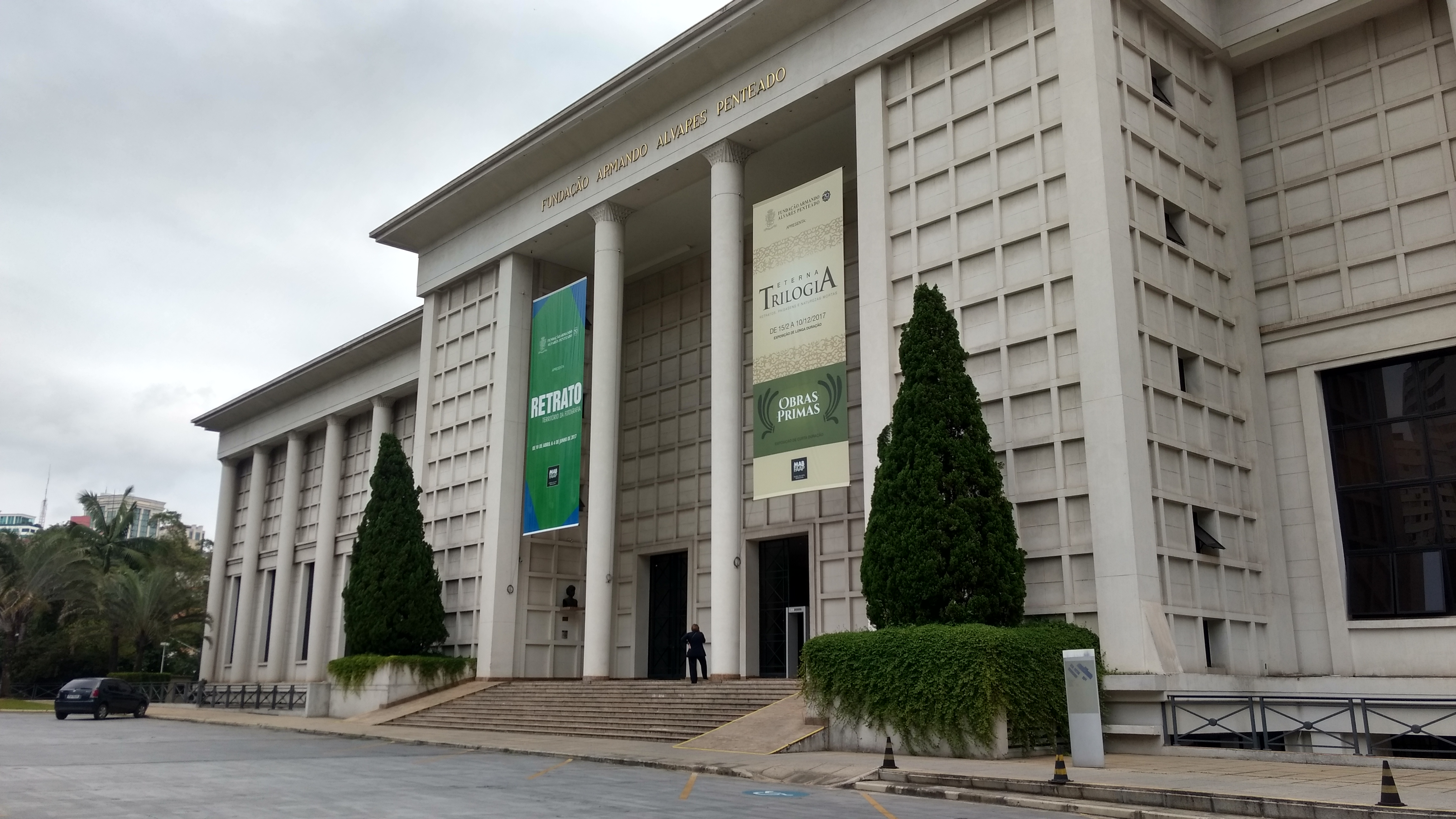
- Fundação Armando Álvares Penteado, Museum of Brazilian Art, 2017
- Type: Private
- Established: 1947
- Chairperson: Celita Procopio de Carvalho
- President: Antonio Bias Bueno Guillon
- Students: 12,500
- Undergraduates: 8,000
- Postgraduates: 4,500
- Location: São Paulo, Ribeirão Preto and São José dos Campos, São Paulo, 01242-902, Brazil; 23.5450°S 46.6631°W
- Campus: Urban
- Colors: Blue and white
- Sporting affiliations: LAACA
- Mascot: Gigi (the Giraffe)
- Website: faap.br

Fundação Armando Álvares Penteado (Armando Álvares Penteado Foundation, also referred as FAAP) was founded in 1947 by earl Armando Álvares Penteado, whose objective was to support, promote and develop the plastic and scenic arts, culture and teaching.

The university has twelve thousand students and twelve hundred professors. The campus is located in Higienópolis, one of the most traditional districts of São Paulo, and houses seven faculties: Business administration, Fine arts, Communication, Engineering, Economics, Law and Technology, post-graduation courses and MBA.

The foundation is a cultural centre in São Paulo, housing one of the most eminent theaters in town (Teatro FAAP) and the Museu de Arte Brasileira (Museum of Brazilian Art). FAAP has received important exhibits, most notably the exhibit "China: A Arte Imperial, A Arte do Cotidiano, A Arte Contemporânea", the "Treasures of the Czars" display (including some of the Fabergé eggs), and in 2011 an exhibit on Grace Kelly, "Os Anos Grace Kelly" (Grace Kelly Era), inaugurated by Prince Albert of Monaco.

Every semester the institution provides lectures from artists, politicians and economists. Guest speakers include George H. W. Bush, Bill Clinton, Gordon Brown, Queen Silvia of Sweden, Rubens Ricupero (also Director Faculty of Economics), Fernando Henrique Cardoso, Peter Mandelson, among others.

== Schools and faculties ==
- School of Arts: courses in fashion, design, architecture, cultural production, and fine arts
- School of Business: business administration
- School of Communications: 2D/3D animation, advertising, film studies, public relations, radio & TV and journalism
- School of Computing and Information Technology: information systems, computer science
- School of Economics: economics and international relations
- School of Engineering: chemical engineering, civil engineering, electrical engineering, mechanical engineering, production engineering
- School of Law: law
- High School

== Notable alumni ==
Some notable FAAP alumni include Laís Bodanzky, Laerte Coutinho, Alexandre da Cunha, João Dória, Alexandre Gama, television presenter and journalist Serginho Groisman, José Leonilson, Bruna Lombardi, Marco Luque, artist and photographer Vik Muniz, journalist Carlos Tramontina, Tomaz di Cunto, Sergio Herz, Ricardo Hirschbruch, Cláudia Pacheco, Antonio Carlos Pannunzio, Denise Pavarina, and Mario Marchetti.
