= Mary Lloyd (sculptor) =

Welsh sculptor (1819–1896)

Mary Charlotte Lloyd
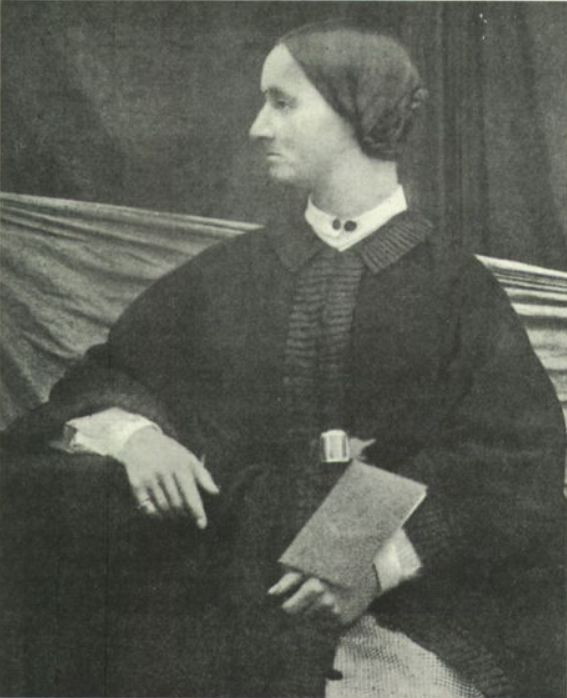
- Born: 23 January 1819; Denbighshire, Wales
- Died: 13 October 1896 (aged 77)
- Resting place: Llanelltyd, Wales
- Known for: sculpture
- Partner: Frances Power Cobbe

Mary Charlotte Lloyd (23 January 1819 – 13 October 1896) was a Welsh sculptor who studied with John Gibson in Rome and lived for decades with the well-known philosopher, animal welfare advocate, and feminist Frances Power Cobbe.

== Biography ==
Lloyd was born in Denbighshire, Wales, the eighth of seventeen children, and the first of six girls, to Edward Lloyd of Rhagatt and his wife Frances Maddocks. Her father was a substantial squire over many counties, owning 4,300 acres of land, and Mary inherited money from a maiden aunt, Margaret, as well as gifts from Eleanor Charlotte Butler and Sarah Ponsonby, the Ladies of Llangollen. Both her parents died in 1858.

She studied and worked with the French artist Rosa Bonheur. In 1853 she was working in the studio of Welsh sculptor John Gibson in Rome, along with the American sculptor Harriet Hosmer.

Her elder brother John Lloyd of Rhagatt (1811–1865), "said to be a humorous poet, an excellent painter and a skilled photographer", inherited estates at Rhagatt, Merionethshire, and Berth, Denbighshire. He became High Sheriff of Denbighshire in 1863, before dying childless.

Lloyd met Frances Power Cobbe in the winter of 1861–1862, in Rome. Mary and Frances networked with like-minded women in Italy in the period, both being nonconformist, with a feminist outlook. In 1863, they settled together in London.

In 1858, Lloyd inherited a share in the Welsh landed estate of Hengwrt. This allowed Lloyd to refer to herself as a landed proprietor when signing petitions supporting women's suffrage, and also gave her some local political rights, such as the ability to appoint a vicar. She and Frances Power Cobbe retired to Hengwrt from London in April 1884.

Lloyd died in 1896 from heart disease and was buried together with Frances Power Cobbe in Saint Illtud Church Cemetery, Llanelltyd.

== Relationship with Frances Power Cobbe ==
Mary and Frances were a couple, and were recognised as such by all their friends. Letters would be addressed to "you and Miss Lloyd" and Frances peppered her own writings with "our house", "our garden", "we" and other joint terminology. Frances writing to her friend Mary Somerville refers to Lloyd as "my wife", and her death in 1896 affected Frances badly. Her friend, the writer Blanche Atkinson, wrote that "[t]he sorrow of Miss Lloyd's death changed the whole aspect of existence for Miss Cobbe. The joy of life had gone. It had been such a friendship as is rarely seen – perfect in love, sympathy, and mutual understand."

Mary Lloyd is the fictionalized narrator of a 2002 story by Emma Donoghue, "The Fox on the Line", about the relationship between Lloyd and Cobbe, and their anti-vivisection activism.
