= Middle Rio Grande Development Council =

- Logo

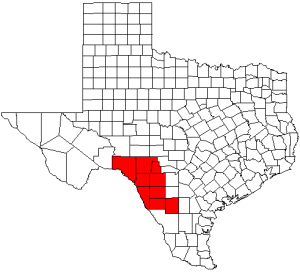
- Map of Texas highlighting counties served by the Middle Rio Grande Development Council
- Formation: March 1970
- Type: Voluntary association of governments
- Region served: 14,333 sq mi (37,120 km^{2})
- Members: 9 counties

Historical population
Year	Pop.	±%
2000	154,381	—
2010	167,010	+8.2%
2020	162,295	−2.8%

The Middle Rio Grande Development Council (MRGDC) is a voluntary association of cities, counties and special districts in southern Texas.

Based in Carrizo Springs, the Middle Rio Grande Development Council is a member of the Texas Association of Regional Councils.

== Counties served ==
- Dimmit
- Edwards
- Kinney
- La Salle
- Maverick
- Real
- Uvalde
- Val Verde
- Zavala

== Largest cities in the region ==
- Del Rio
- Eagle Pass
- Uvalde
- Crystal City
- Carrizo Springs
- Cotulla
