= José Leonilson =

Brazilian painter (1957–1993)

Jose Leonilson
- Born: Jose Leonilson Bezerra Dias; 1957; Fortaleza, Ceara
- Died: 1993 (aged 35–36); Sao Paulo, Brazil
- Known for: Painter, draughtsman, 3D textile art, sculptor
- Style: conceptual

José Leonilson Bezerra Dias (b. 1957 Fortaleza, Ceará – d. 1993 São Paulo, São Paulo), was a Brazilian artist working in both 2D as a painter and draughtsman and in 3D as textile worker and sculptor. He lived most of his life in Brazil where he created conceptual artworks focused on expressions of love and grief specifically from a queer-lens. Leonilson was diagnosed with HIV (AIDS) at the age of 34, and died a few years later from complications.

== Career ==
In 1961, Leonilson moved with his family to São Paulo, Brazil where he later started studying art education at Fundação Armando Álvares Penteado in 1977. While there, Leonilson studied under multiple artists and instructors who were fundamental to his introduction to contemporary forms of artwork. Julio Plaza (1938–2003) was an artist and scholar who focused on working in new mediums and the conceptual theory behind connecting them to traditional forms. Additionally, Leonilson studied under Nelson Leirner (1932–2020) who influenced him through his use of allegorical (and sometimes also erotic) artworks focused on political and social criticisms. Later, Leonilson studied under Dudi Maia Rosa (1946- ) at the Aster Art School where, again, the use of materials beyond paint and sculpture were emphasized in their importance in expressing universal themes through an alternative mode.

Leonilson briefly traveled in Europe, and in the early 1980s he interacted with Transavantgarde scene, Italy specific neo-expressionism, that had completely different focus for their artwork than the conceptual art movement at that time in Brazil.

Returning to Brazil in 1982, he continued creating artwork that was predominantly autobiographical of his adult life and experiences as a queer man. Critics such as Lisette Lagnado have claimed that his artworks were so "raw" and "revealing" that they were almost like "intimate letters in his diary". The impact of his artwork was deeply felt within certain marginalized communities as it represented and affirmed queer identities – counter-cultural to authoritarian powers at the time like Brazil's military dictatorship and the Catholic Church.

Further in his career, Leonilson began to include the use of fabrics and sewing. This was familiar to him because his parents worked as cloth merchants. This shift to textiles and 3D forms was originally inspired by artists who utilized fabrics to convey societal message like Hélio Oiticica's in their artwork Parangolé. In conjunction with this, Leonilson's art career was heavily impacted by his HIV (AIDS) diagnosis in 1991. In the following years, Leonilson experienced physical complications that affected his ability to continue painting; he then fully pivoted to solely use textiles and embroidery. Regardless of the diagnosis, he continued to produce artworks but they became more sparse and increasingly allegorical for his illness. A famous 1993 installation conceived for Capela do Morumbi in São Paulo emphasized universal themes of life and death – the fragile and ephemeral nature of life coupled with welcoming of bodily deterioration and death. His artworks created during these last few years clearly spoke to the issues he faced as a queer man living with HIV as his art became a practice for working through his own grief. As Lagnado points out: "beyond the evidence of his ailment, the marks of his resistance against the anguish of death". This turmoil and grief was brought to life through Leonilson's final artworks and in his personal audio-diary recordings.

Leonilson died of complications from HIV on March 28, 1993, in São Paulo. He was posthumously awarded in 1994 by the São Paulo Association of Art Critics for his artworks and contributions. Much of his artwork is recognized for its historical importance in chronicling and visually representing individuals affected by the AIDs epidemic in museums and collections in the years following his death.

== Art Analysis ==
=== 34 with Scars ===
1991, acrylic, embroidery thread, and plastic tacks on voile, 16 1/8 x 12 3/16" (41 x 31 cm), Museum of Modern Art, New York

Leonilson's 34 with Scars came shortly after his HIV diagnosis and is artwork of his that depicted this. The piece itself serves as a self-portrait where Leonilson exposes his inner body in order to visualize his disease to the participants. The empty white fabric, now a stand-in for his body, manifests personal disfigurements through stitched black scars and a indication of his age. These two handstitched components atop his "body" allude to the title of the piece as well as allegorize his illness and condition by depicting biological and visceral images.

34 with Scars illustrates the physical struggles of queer men living with HIV/AIDS and alludes to the lived experience of negative perceptions and discrimination. Leonilson provides an intimate self-portrait that is so raw and simplistic in its message of terminal suffering from illness that even individuals without this condition could understand this piece as a memento mori. As a candid portrayal of the diseased body, 34 with Scars humanizes and destigmatizes queer men living with HIV through Leonilson's vulnerable and autobiographical depictions of universal concepts such as death and suffering.

=== O Penelope (The Penelope) ===
1993, mixed fabrics, 222 x 83 cm, Tate Modern, London

O Penelope is a series of 10 panels of varying diaphanous fabrics patched together to form a draping banner. The color of each panel is fairly similar with slight variations of off-whites and pale blues. Running along the edge is a large, imperfect, hand-sewn stitches of embroidery thread. Additionally, a common motif in Leonilson's works was the empty chair stitched into the margins.

Through this artwork, Leonilson connected himself with, synthesized, and subsequently subverted historical narratives and modes of artmaking. Starting with the mythology of this piece, O Penelope is in direct conversation with the story of Penelope who waits for her husband Odysseus to return home after the Trojan War (as told in Homer's Odyssey). With Odysseus not immediately returning after the war, Penelope was pressured by suitors to remarry. She tells the men that she cannot do so until she finishes weaving a shroud to present to her father-in-law as was customary to pay respect to Odysseus who was presumed dead. She worked on the project for many days on end. However, in order to prevent herself from finishing it, she secretly undid that day's work at night to stall for Odysseus' return as long as she could.

By creating a shroud of his own, Leonilson was directly inserting himself into this well-known story of the "faithful spouse waiting for their lover to return". Leonilson's "shroud" is analogous to that of Penelope's, but also serves a different purpose as his story diverges from hers. He dies very shortly after finishing this piece and his unknown suitor never comes back from their voyage. Leonilson's shroud not only addressed his yearning for love that was never fulfilled, but the work was also introspective and recognized his own impending passing due to HIV. In fact, O Penelope was a paradoxical artwork itself as a rapidly deteriorating Leonilson purposefully committed himself to the time-intensive medium of embroidery. Leonilson had commented on how the process of sewing was therapeutic and spiritual – almost as if it was the only thing holding him together in his last few years – and this artwork seems to encapsulate this as he used sewing to cope with his current condition as well as to forestall his grim future.

Additionally, Leonilson entered into dialogue with current movements in feminism when he adopted the traditionally feminine practice of embroidery as his main mode of artmaking. This pushing and subverting of gender boundaries can be further observed in the title of the artwork which is stitched into the fabric. Looking at the original Portuguese title, O Penelope, Leonilson has deliberately combined the masculine article "O" with the feminine noun/name "Penelope". This intentional deconstruction and repurposing of gendered language was a common motif in his artworks– both functioning to remove gender from the artform of needlework and to also remove gendered restrictions on this traditionally feminine narrative of yearning and longing.

== Artworks and exhibitions ==
=== Artworks in the Museum of Modern Art Collection, New York ===
- The Japanese Woman, 1988, acrylic on canvas, 41 5/16 x 61" (105 x 155 cm)

- Desire is a Blue Lake, 1989, watercolor and ink on paper, 12 1/2 x 9 3/8" (31.9 x 24 cm)

- Men With Their Own Attentions, 1989, watercolor and ink on paper, 12 1/2 x 9 3/8" (32 x 24 cm)

- To Make Your Soul Close to Me, 1989, watercolor and ink on paper, 12 1/2 x 9 3/8" (31.9 x 23.9 cm)

- Sunset, Earthquake, Loneliness, 1990, ink and metallic color on paper, 11 7/8 x 8 7/8" (30.4 x 22.7 cm)

- 34 with Scars, 1991, acrylic, embroidery thread, and plastic tacks on voile, 16 1/8 x 12 3/16" (41 x 31 cm)

- I Am Your Man, 1992, watercolor and ink on paper, 9 x 12" (22.8 x 30.5 cm)

=== Exhibitions at the Museum of Modern Art, New York ===
- 1996 – "Projects 53: Oliver Herring/Leonilson" – (January 18 – March 12)

- 2004 – "MoMA at El Museo: Latin American and Caribbean Art from the Collection of The Museum of Modern Art" – (March 4 – July 25)

- 2006 – "Transforming Chronologies: An Atlas of Drawing, Part Two" – (May 10 – October 2)

- 2008 – "New Perspectives in Latin American Art" – (November 21 – February 25)

- 2008–2009 – "Here Is Everything. Four Decades of Contemporary Art" – (September 10 – March 23)

- 2010–2011 – "Contemporary Art from the Collection" – (June 30 – Sep 19)

- 2011 – "I Am Still Alive: Politics and Everyday Life in Contemporary Drawing" – (March 23 – September 19)

== See also ==
- Hélio Oiticica
- Félix González-Torres
- Oliver Herring
- Arthur Bispo do Rosario
