= Steve Lew =

- Born: Watsonville, California
- Known for: LGBT and AIDS activism

Steve Lew (born 1958 in Watsonville, California) is an American community organizer, LGBT rights activist and AIDS activist.

== Biography ==
In 1987, Lew was an organizer for the first west coast conference for Asian Pacific Lesbian and Gays. Lew also co-founded the Gay Asian Pacific Alliance Community HIV Project in San Francisco. The organization grew into a national service organization, was renamed the Living Well project, and eventually merged with the Asian AIDS project to become the Asian and Pacific Islander Wellness Center in 1997.

In 1995, Lew was appointed as a member of the Presidential Advisory Council on HIV/AIDS.

Lew is a currently Senior Project Director for CompassPoint Nonprofit Services in Oakland, California.
