= Anna Laszuk =

Polish radio journalist, columnist

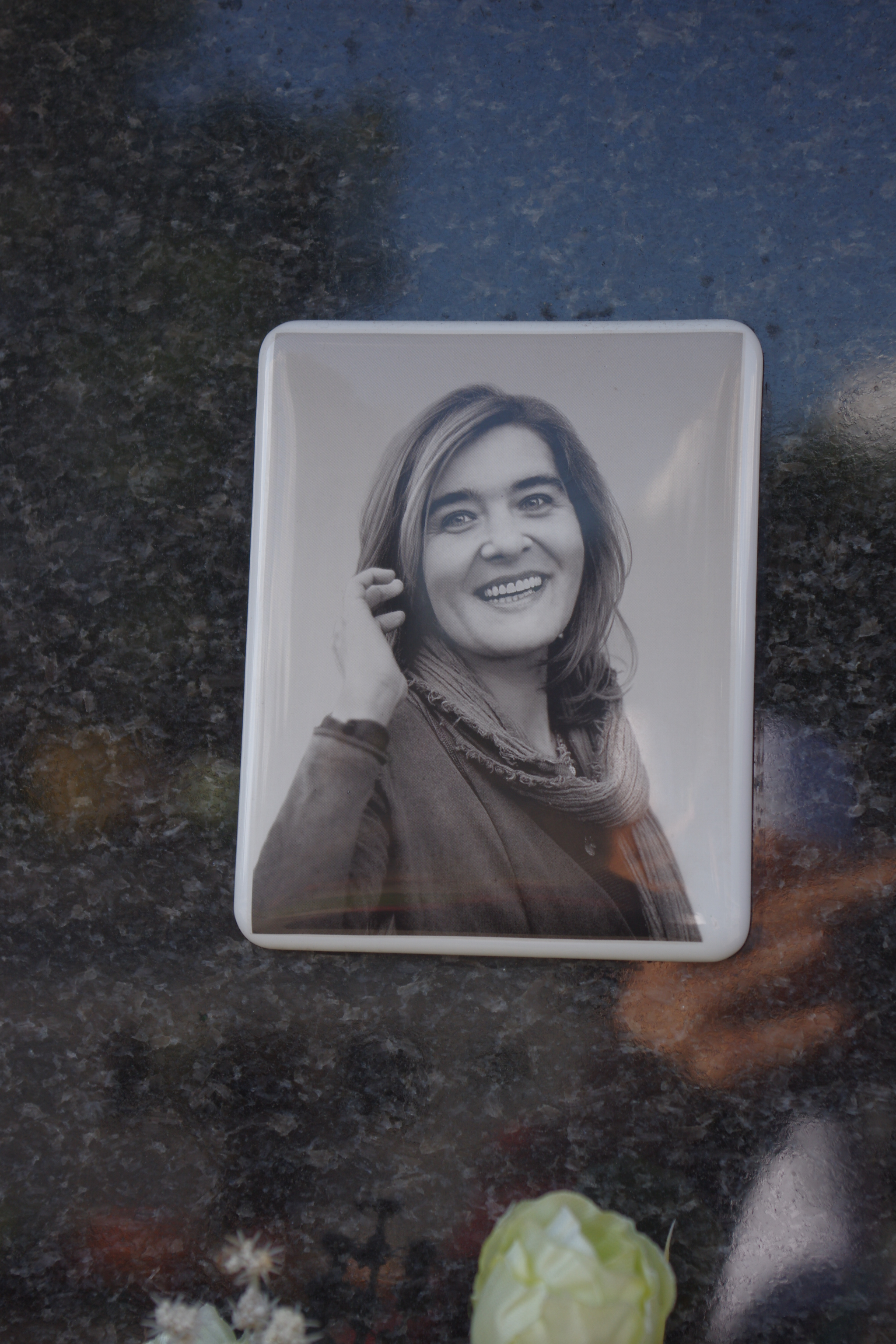
- Born: 9 November 1969. Warsaw
- Died: 12 October 2012 (aged 42); Warsaw
- Occupation(s): Radio journalist, columnist and lesbian movement activist

Anna Laszuk (9 November 1969 – 12 October 2012) was a Polish radio journalist, columnist and lesbian movement activist.

From 2000 Laszuk worked for Radio TOK FM, and became lead for the radio program Komentarze. Laszuk was the chief editor for Furia, a Polish feminist-lesbian irregular magazine. In addition to this, she also directed an amateur theatre group and led sociotherapeutic activities for children.

She died of cancer on 12 October 2012. She is buried in the Northern Communal Cemetery.

TOK FM established the annual award Anny Laszuk from 2013, given for "courageous, unconventional, unusual activities, work or expression, which had a significant impact on public awareness and change to Polish life."

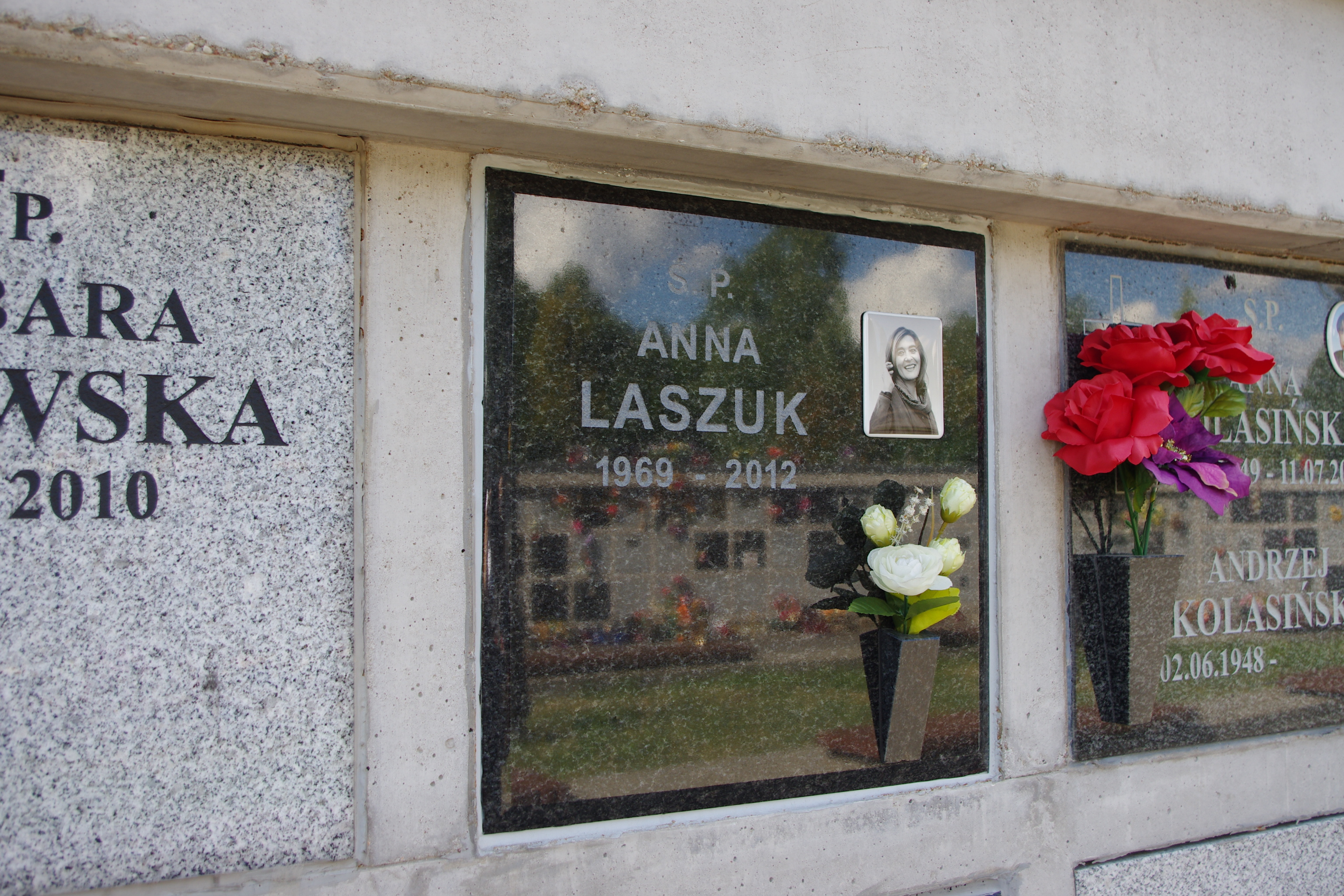
Anna Laszuk's grave in Warsaw at Northern Communal Cemetery

== Publications ==
- Laszuk, Anna (2006), Dziewczyny, wyjdźcie z szafy! [Girls, come out of the closet!] (in Polish), Fundacja Lorga, ISBN 978-83-923554-1-0, OCLC 654898151
- Laszuk, Anna; Sosnowska, Beata (2010), Mała książka o homofobii [A little book of homophobia] (in Polish), Wydawnictwo Czarna Owca, ISBN 978-83-7554-241-7
