= Replika (Polish magazine) =

LGBT+ themed magazine

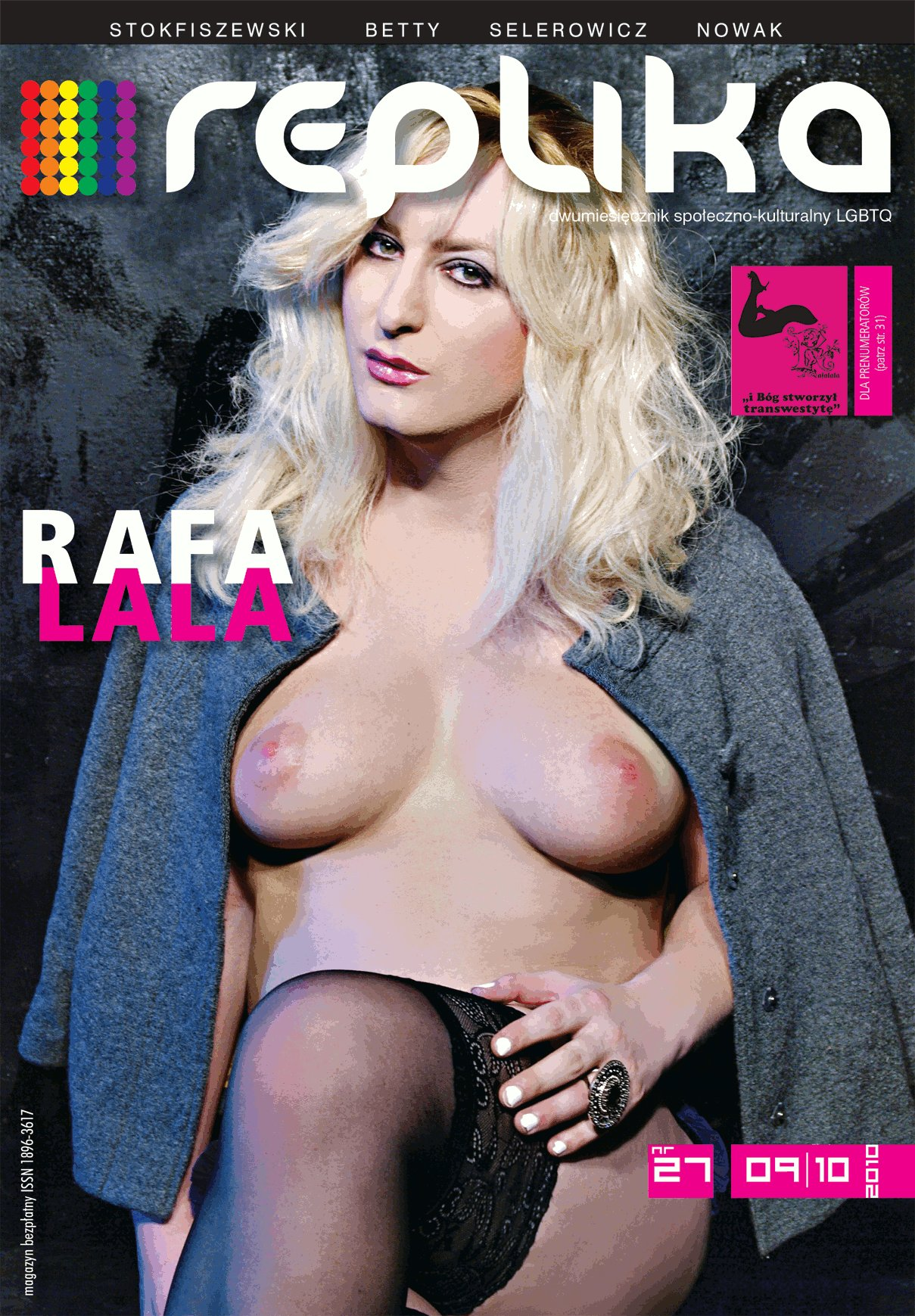
- Issue nr. 9/10 2010
- Editor: Mariusz Kurc
- Categories: socio-cultural
- Frequency: Bi-monthly
- Format: A4
- Publisher: Campaign Against Homophobia (2005–2011); Fundation Replika (since 2011)
- Paid circulation: 4500
- Country: Poland
- Language: Polish
- Website: www.replika-online.pl
- ISSN: 1896-3617

Replika is a Polish bi-monthly socio-cultural magazine, first published by Campaign Against Homophobia (2005–2011) and then by Fundation Replika (since 2011). It is the only regularly published, printed magazine of LGBT topics in Poland. (Note: Before, there was published a magazine titled Ayor, which last issue was published in September 2007. Other newspaper, Navigaytor, is not a magazine.)

== Publication, distribution and history ==
Replika is available to prenumerators as a printed magazine or e-press in PDF format. SIngle issues can be bought at the website of the magazine, Polish online marketplace website called Allegro, in e-shops LGBTIA and in selected shops of the Empik, Relay and InMedio networks. Free issues are also available at gay friendly places and LGBT orgs headquarters.

The newspaper is divided into sections: Events, Interviews, Society, Culture, History, "Kadry bez wstydu" (a photoshot section), Reviews of theatre plays, movies and books, Feuilletons.

The first editor-in-chief of the magazine was Ewa Tomaszewicz (2005–2009). Since 2009, the editor-in-chief (constantly) of Replika is Mariusz Kurc. Feuilletons in Replika were written, among others, by Bartosz Żurawiecki, Piotr Grabarczyk, Kayden Gray Sylwia Chutnik, Maja Heban, Patrycja Sikora-Tarnowska, Olga Górska and Izabela Morska.

Since 2018, Replika publishes every year Callendars of Replika with naked photos of queer people born or living in Poland.

In the pages of the magazine, coming out was done by, among others, Anna Grodzka, Kuba Kowalski, Tomasz Tyndyk, Michał Sieczkowski, Magdalena Mosiewicz, Grzegorz Niziołek, Karolina Hamer and Sylwia Chutnik.

The magazine interviewed Krzysztof Charamsa, singersWojciech Łuszczykiewicz, Czesław Mozil, Alicja Majewska, Kora, Kayah, Tatiana Okupnik, Izabela Trojanowska, Michał Kwiatkowski i Natalia Kukulska, journalists Tomasz Raczek, Kazimiera Szczuka and Marta Konarzewska, boxer Dariusz Michalczewski, actors Xavier Dolan, Izabela Kuna, Katarzyna Figura, Renata Dancewicz, Paweł Małaszyński, Ewa Kasprzyk, directors Agnieszka Holland, Małgorzata Szumowska and Piotr Sieklucki, politicians Krystian Legierski, Barbara Nowacka, Ryszard Kalisz and Magdalena Środa, dancers Michał Piróg and writers Mikołaj Milcke and Marcin Szczygielski.

== Awards ==
- 2007: Economic SOciety for Gays and Lesbians (pol. Towarzystwo Ekonomiczne na rzecz Gejów i Lesbijek) awarded the magazine as the most cherished by sexual minorities medium in POland in category LGBT Media.
- 2013: award for Marius Kurc, the editor-in-chief in a journalist contest "Media of Equal Chances" organized by the office of the Governmental Plenipotentiary of Equal Treatment. The awarded journalism piece was an interview with gay living with disability Rafał Urbacki titled "Saint" (pol. Święty), published in Replina nr. 35 (January 2012)
- 2021: special wards in a plebiscite Crown of Equality (pol. Korony Równości) organized by Campaign Against Homophobia – for the entirety of their actions.
- 2021: nomination in a LGBT+ contest Diamond Awards in category "Partnership of a year" for cooperation with Ringier Axel Springer Polska, in which selected archival content of Replika was published in online portal Onet.pl.

== Collection "Polish LGBTIA Icons" ==
In issue 83 (January/February 2020), Replika started publishing a collection of drawings "Polish LGBT Icons". In every issue, there is a portrait drawn by Marcel Olczyński, and in years 2020–2024 the subscribers, together with the magazine, also got a magnet.

- Issue 83 – Maria Konopnicka
- Issue 84 – Jarosław Iwaszkiewicz
- Issue 85 – Maria Dąbrowska
- Issue 86 – Karol Szymanowski
- Issue 87 – Zofia Sadowska
- Issue 88 – Witold Gombrowicz
- Issue 89 – Kim Lee
- Issue 90 – Maria Janion
- Issue 91 – Fryderyk Chopin
- Issue 92 – Miron Białoszewski
- Issue 93 – Maria Rodziewiczówna
- Issue 94 – Juliusz Słowacki
- Issue 95 – Maria Dulębianka
- Issue 96 – Władysław III Warneńczyk
- Issue 97 – Bolesław V the Chaste i Leszek Czarny
- Issue 98 – Henryk III Walezy
- Issue 99 – Anna Laszuk
- Issue 100 – Władysław IV Waza
- Issue 101 – Michał Korybut Wiśniowiecki
- Issue 102 – Bolesław II Szczodry
- Issue 103 – Stanisław August Poniatowski
- Issue 104 – Tamara Łempicka
- Issue 105 – Jerzy Andrzejewski
- Issue 106 – Anna Kowalska
- Issue 107 – Witold Conti
- Issue 108 – Eva Kotchever
- Issue 109 – Stanisława Walasiewicz
- Issue 110 – Paulina Kuczalska-Reinschmit
- Issue 111 – Maria Jadwiga Strumff
- Issue 112 – Karol Hanusz
- Issue 113 – Narcyza Żmichowska
- Issue 114 – Konrad Swinarski
- Issue 115 – Izabela Jaruga-Nowacka
