= Queer.pl =

Poland-based online newspaper and portal focused on LGBT topics

- Former name: innastrona.pl
- Website type: LGBT journalism and social media site
- Available in: Polish
- Headquarters: Kraków, {{{location_country}}}
- Owner: Radosław Oliwa
- Website: queer.pl
- Registration: optional
- Launched: 15 September 1992; 34 years ago

Queer.pl (formerly innastrona.pl) is the oldest online newspaper and portal marketed to the lesbian, gay, bisexual, transgender, queer community (LGBTQ+) in Poland. It was established in 1996 by Radosław Oliwa, and is published by queermedia. In 2012 innastrona.pl refreshed its look and changed its name to queer.pl.

== History ==
The website supports events such as pride parades in Warsaw and Kraków and participates in public debate about topics such as civil partnership, coming out and outing. The platform cooperates with Polish LGBT organizations such as Campaign Against Homophobia and Lambda Warsaw. Since 2012, it has organized local meetings in Kraków called Klub Queer.pl.

The portal cooperates or has cooperated with many well-known publicists, activists, artists, bloggers etc. such as: Mariusz Kurc (editor-in-chief of the Polish LGBT magazine Replika), Łukasz Maciejewski, Bartosz Żurawiecki, Janusz Marchwiński, Witold Jabłoński, Jacek Kochanowski, Tomasz Sikora, Krzysztof Tomasik, Marcin Pietras, Edward Pasewicz, Ewa Tomaszewicz, Mariusz Drozdowski, and Anna Krystowczyk.

In 2007, the website won the Economic Society for Gays and Lesbians' award for best internet LGBT portal. This was the first time the prize had been awarded.

In 2014, queer.pl published an app for iPhone, iPad and mobile devices with Android OS.

== Statistics ==
In 2006, the website was visited monthly by 34% of Polish internet users identifying as LGBT. The same year, according to the research company QM and the Economic Society for Gay and Lesbians, the portal earned 55% of all revenue from internet advertisement directed towards Polish LGBT people.

According to research by Megapanel PBI/Gemius from July 2009, the portal had roughly 170 000 monthly users, with more than 8 million visits per month.

== Bibliography ==
- Mainpage of the portal
- David Paternotte, Manon Tremblay (2016). The Ashgate Research Companion to Lesbian and Gay Activism. Routledge. p. 229. ISBN 9781317042914.
