= Magdalena Grzyb =

Polish jurist (born 1984)

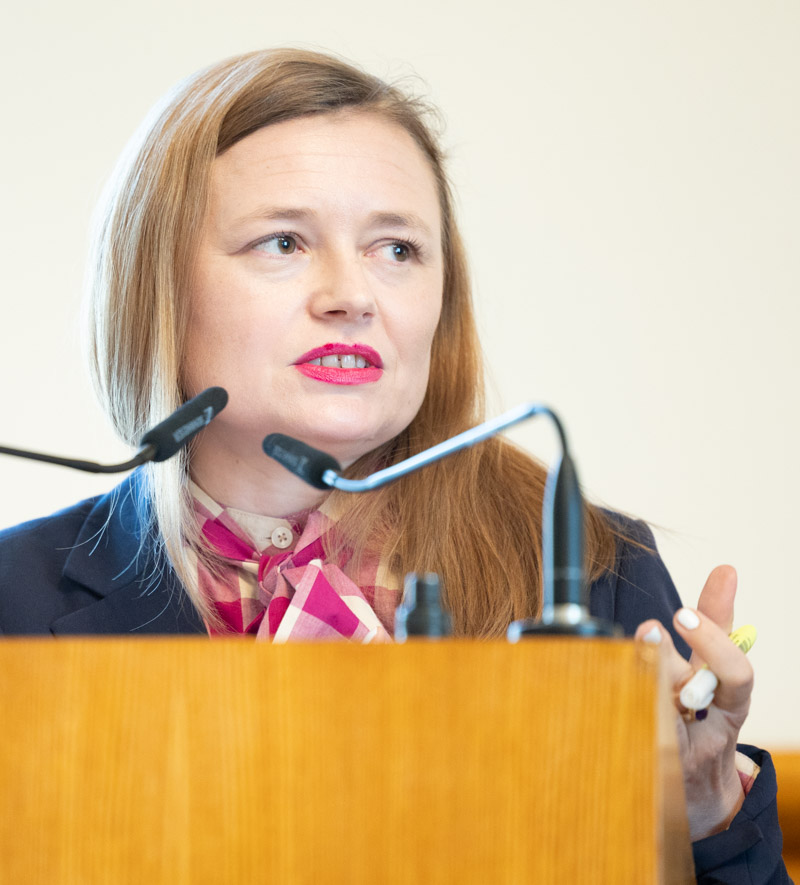
- Magdalena Grzyb, 2026
- Born: 1984 (age 41–42)
- Citizenship: Polish
- Education: Jagiellonian University
- Occupation: Criminologist

Magdalena Grzyb (born 1984) is a Polish criminologist, academic teacher at the Jagiellonian University and opinion journalist.

== Biography ==
She is the daughter of Wieńczysław Grzyb, lawyer from Żywiec; sister of lawyer Przemysław Grzyb.

From 2003 to 2008, she studied law at the Faculty of Law and Administration of the Jagiellonian University. In 2015, she obtained a PhD in law from the same faculty for her thesis Kryminologiczne i prawnokarne aspekty przestępstw motywowanych kulturowo (Criminological and Criminal Aspects of Culturally Motivated Crimes), supervised by Janina Błachut. In 2025 she obtained a habilitation degree.

She was elected secretary of the Criminology Commission of the Polish Academy of Arts and Sciences. In September 2023, she became a member of the supervisory board of the Women's Rights Center.

She published a monograph Kobieta jako ofiara zabójstwa. Studium kryminologiczne (Woman as a Victim of Murder. A Criminological Study, 2024). She co-authored the book Kryminologia: zarys systemu (Criminology: Outline of the System, 2022; together with Jan Widacki, Wojciech Dadak and Anna Szuba-Boroń).

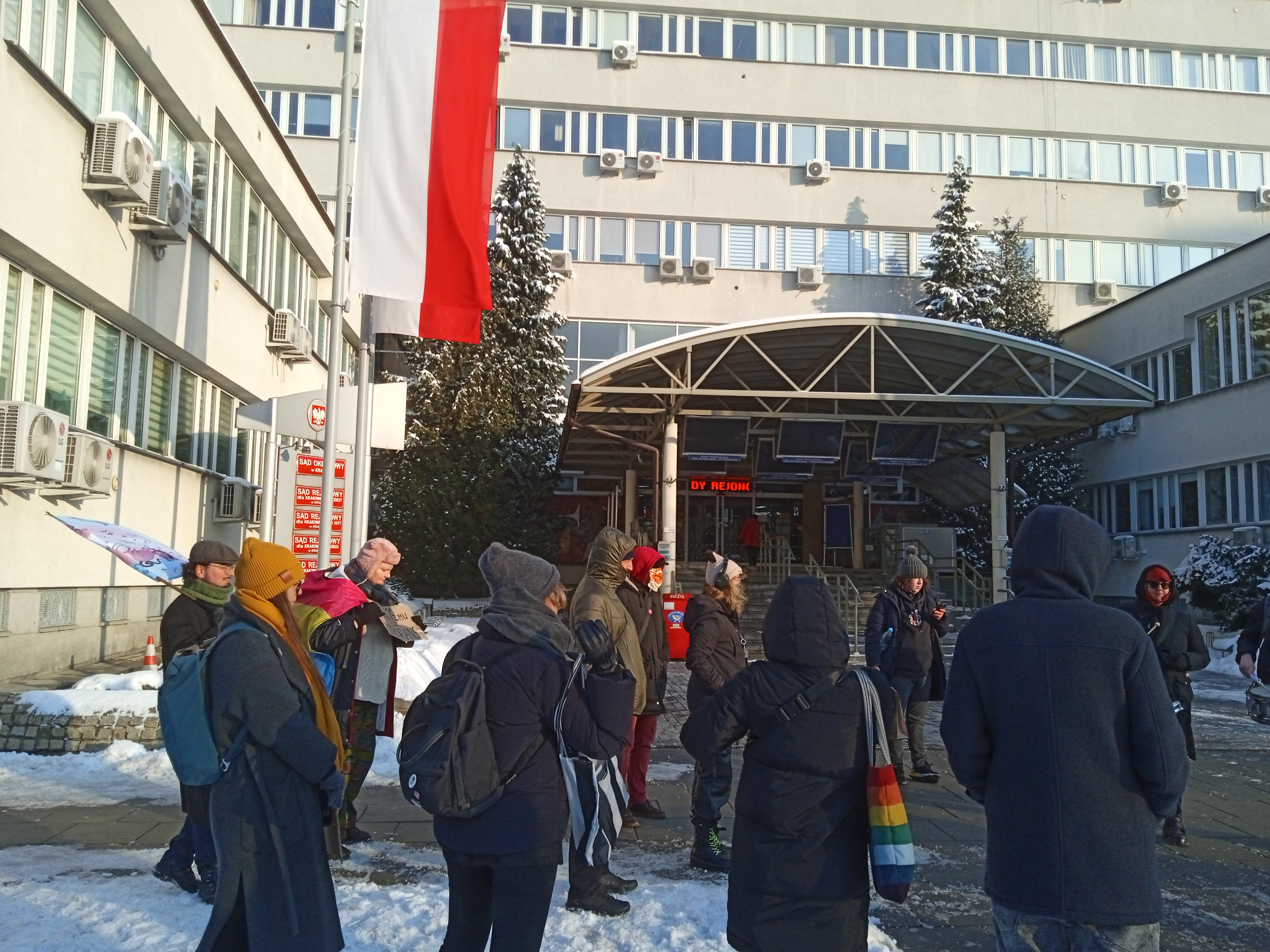
A demonstration in front of the district court building in Kraków, accompanying the hearing in the case brought by Magdalena Grzyb against transgender activist Maja Heban, 8 January 2024

Magdalena Grzyb has described herself as a “cursed feminist” and a victim of cancel culture. Her journalistic texts have appeared on the Kultura Liberalna portal and Gazeta Wyborcza. In December 2021, her lecture as part of the 16 Days Against Gender-Based Violence event at the Jagiellonian University sparked protests following accusations of transphobia against Magdalena Grzyb. At that time, Przemysław Czarnek, the Minister of Education and Science, defended Magdalena Grzyb. She sued Maja Heban after Heban called her “TERF”. Łukasz Sakowski testified in court as a witness in the case.
