= Zygmunt Kałużyński =

Polish film critic (1918–2004)

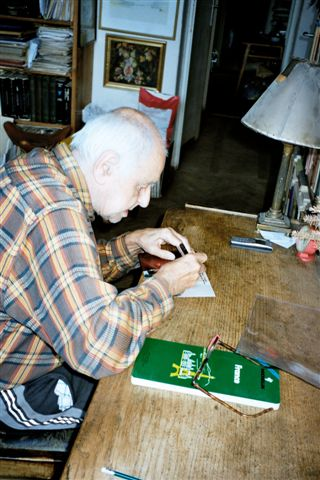
- Kałużyński in 2004
- Born: 11 December 1918; Lublin, Poland
- Died: 30 September 2004 (aged 85); Warsaw, Poland
- Citizenship: Polish
- Occupation: Film critic

Zygmunt Kałużyński (11 December 1918 – 30 September 2004) was a Polish film critic, promoter of cinema, erudite, lawyer, long-time contributor of Polityka magazine and a TV personality. His opinions were often controversial, with some even accusing him of doing harm to the Polish cinema industry. Despite that, he enjoyed a devoted fan base.

== Biography ==
He was the son of Jan Kałużyński and Helena née Grafczyńska. His father was a bank clerk who abandoned the family, and his mother was a pianist and music teacher. After his mother's death in June 1931, he was raised by his uncle, Tadeusz Grafczyński, in Lublin. He studied law at the University of Warsaw and theatre direction at the Państwowy Instytut Sztuki Teatralnej.

During the Nazi occupation of Poland he befriended Bogdan Paprocki whom he accompanied and performed with him at clandestine concerts in Lublin and Nałęczów.

In the years 1990–2000, together with Tomasz Raczek, he hosted a television series on TVP2 entitled Perły z lamusa, in which films were presented and discussed.

In 1961 he was registered as Security Service confidential contact whose codename was "Literat". His cooperation with the Security Service lasted until 1970. In 1987, the Security Service reestablished contact with him, registering him as an secret collaborator. Zygmunt Kałużyński broke off the collaboration after a few months.

He was married twice, for the first time with Julia Hartwig, for the second time with Eleanor Griswold, actress.

Kałużyński died on 30 September 2004.

== Books ==
- Kanikuła. Fantazja dramatyczna w 9 scenach. Czytelnik. 1946. Foreword by Stefan Lichański.
- Podróż na Zachód. Czytelnik. 1953.
- Listy zza trzech granic. Czytelnik. 1957.
- Nowy Kaliban. Notatki kibica z okresu fermentu. Czytelnik. 1961.
- Bilet wstępu do nowego wieku. Wydawnictwa Artystyczne i Filmowe. 1963.
- Salon dla miliona. Czytelnik. 1966.
- Nowa fala zalewa kino. Wydawnictwa Artystyczne i Filmowe. 1970.
- Pożegnanie molocha. Państwowy Instytut Wydawniczy. 1972.
- Wenus automobilowa. Obyczaje współczesne na ekranie. Państwowy Instytut Wydawniczy. 1976.
- Demon milionowy. Mity, obsesje, wizje dla mas. Państwowy Instytut Wydawniczy. 1978.
- Seans przerywany. Wydawnictwa Artystyczne i Filmowe 1980. 1980. ISBN 83-221-0127-9.
- Superman chałturnik. Sztuka popularna o dramatach naszych czasów. Państwowy Instytut Wydawniczy. 1982. ISBN 83-06-00773-5.
- Widok z pozycji przewróconego. Państwowy Instytut Wydawniczy. 1985. ISBN 83-06-01209-7.
- Diabelskie zwierciadło. Wydawnictwa Artystyczne i Filmowe. 1986. ISBN 83-221-0354-9.
- Paszkwil na siebie samego. Państwowy Instytut Wydawniczy. 1988. ISBN 83-06-01631-9.
- Pamiętnik rozbitka. BGW. 1991. ISBN 83-7066-144-0.
- Perły do lamusa? Rozmowy o filmach lat dziewięćdziesiątych. Tomasz Raczek (co-author). Opus. 1992. ISBN 83-7089-006-7.
- Bankiet w domu powieszonego. BGW. 1993. ISBN 83-7066-519-5.
- Kolacja z celuloidu. Polski Dom Wydawniczy. 1994. ISBN 83-7043-163-1.
- Poławiacze pereł. Tomasz Raczek (co-author). Twój Styl. 1998. ISBN 83-7163-063-8.
- Buntownik bywalec. Ars. 1998. ISBN 83-904920-4-0.
- Perłowa ruletka. Leksykon filmowy. Tomasz Raczek (co-author). Twój Styl. 2000. ISBN 83-7163-256-8.
- Wampir Salonowiec. Twój Styl. 2001. ISBN 83-7163-288-6.
- Kino na nowy wiek. Siedmioróg. 2001. ISBN 83-7162-982-6.
- Pamiętnik orchidei: zapiski ocalonego z XX wieku. Instytut Wydawniczy „Latarnik”. 2003. ISBN 83-917891-0-1. Second edition, extended: Pamiętnik orchidei. Pożegnania. Instytut Wydawniczy „Latarnik”. 2005. ISBN 83-60000-00-X.
- Do czytania pod prysznicem: znalezione w osobistej szufladzie. Instytut Wydawniczy „Latarnik”. 2004. ISBN 83-917891-6-0.

== Distinctions ==
- Gold Cross of Merit "on the 10th anniversary of the People's Republic of Poland for merits in the field of culture and art" (11 July 1955)
- Commander's Cross with Star of the Order of Polonia Restituta "in recognition of outstanding merits in journalistic and socio-cultural activities" (5 March 1997)
