= Kim Lee (drag queen) =

Polish-Vietnamese drag queen and activist

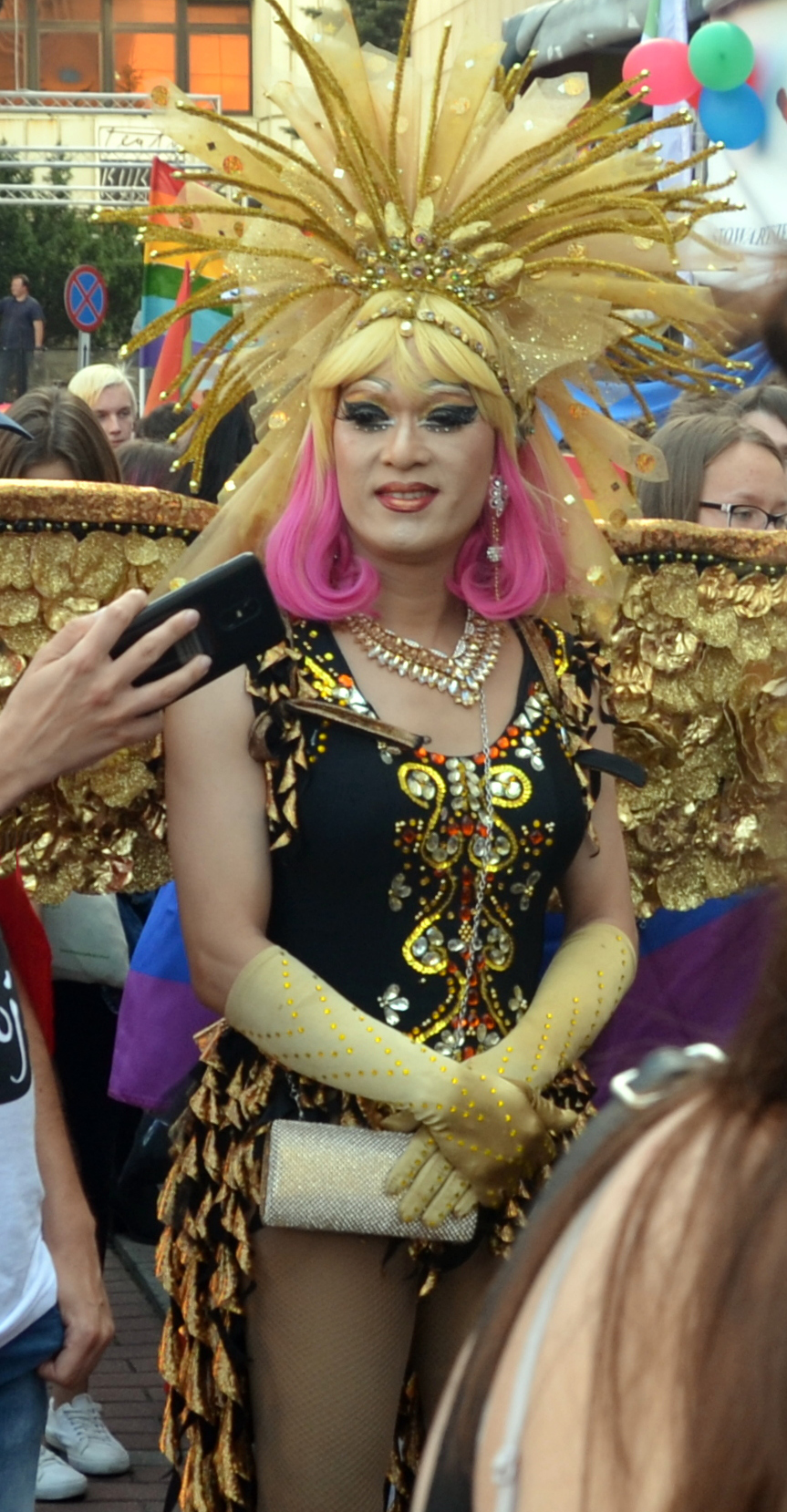
- Lee in 2018
- Born: Andy Nguyen; December 28, 1963; Hanoi, Vietnam
- Died: December 18, 2020 (aged 56); Warsaw, Poland
- Years active: 2002-2020

Kim Lee (born Andy Nguyen; December 28, 1963, in Hanoi – December 18, 2020 in Warsaw) was a Polish drag queen of Vietnamese origin and a queer activist.

== Early life ==
He came from Vietnam, from where he arrived in Poland as a scholarship holder to study nuclear physics at the University of Warsaw. In 1998 he received Polish citizenship. He himself stated that he was 10 years younger, hence after his death some stated that he was 48 years old at the time of death, or was born in 1973.

== Drag career ==
From 2002, he performed as a drag queen, assuming the character of Kim Lee, which he cultivated until his death in 2020. As Kim Lee, he performed emulating Violetta Villas, Kora, Hanna Banaszak, Beata Kozidrak, Kayah, Urszula, Liza Minnelli, Marilyn Monroe, among others. In 2015, he had about 200 songs in his repertoire. Kim's wardrobe consisted of 700 creations, 60 pairs of shoes and several dozen wigs. He performed in gay clubs all over Poland. After the Eurovision Song Contest 2014, he appeared in a music video produced in cooperation with Krytyka Polityczna, which was a response to the performance of Donatan and Cleo and their song "My Słowianie". The producer of the music video was Jaś Kapela, the director and editor was Małgorzata Suwała, and Justyna Jary was responsible for the vocals. As an actor, he performed, among others, in the play “Vietnam / Warszawa” at the Powszechny Theater and in "#jaś #i #małgosia" at TR Warszawa Theatere. At the Second Strefa Theatre, he performed in the Boylesque Show. Andy was also active in the Polish LGBT community; he collaborated with the Campaign Against Homophobia and Love Does Not Exclude non-governmental organizations. He also hosted drag queen workshops for amateurs, organized 11 editions of the "Kim Lee Drag Queen Festival" and co-organized the Miss Trans contest.

== Death ==
He died a few days before his birthday on December 18, 2020, as a result of being infected with COVID-19. Previously, he had been in a medically induced coma for over a month on a ventilator.

== Legacy ==
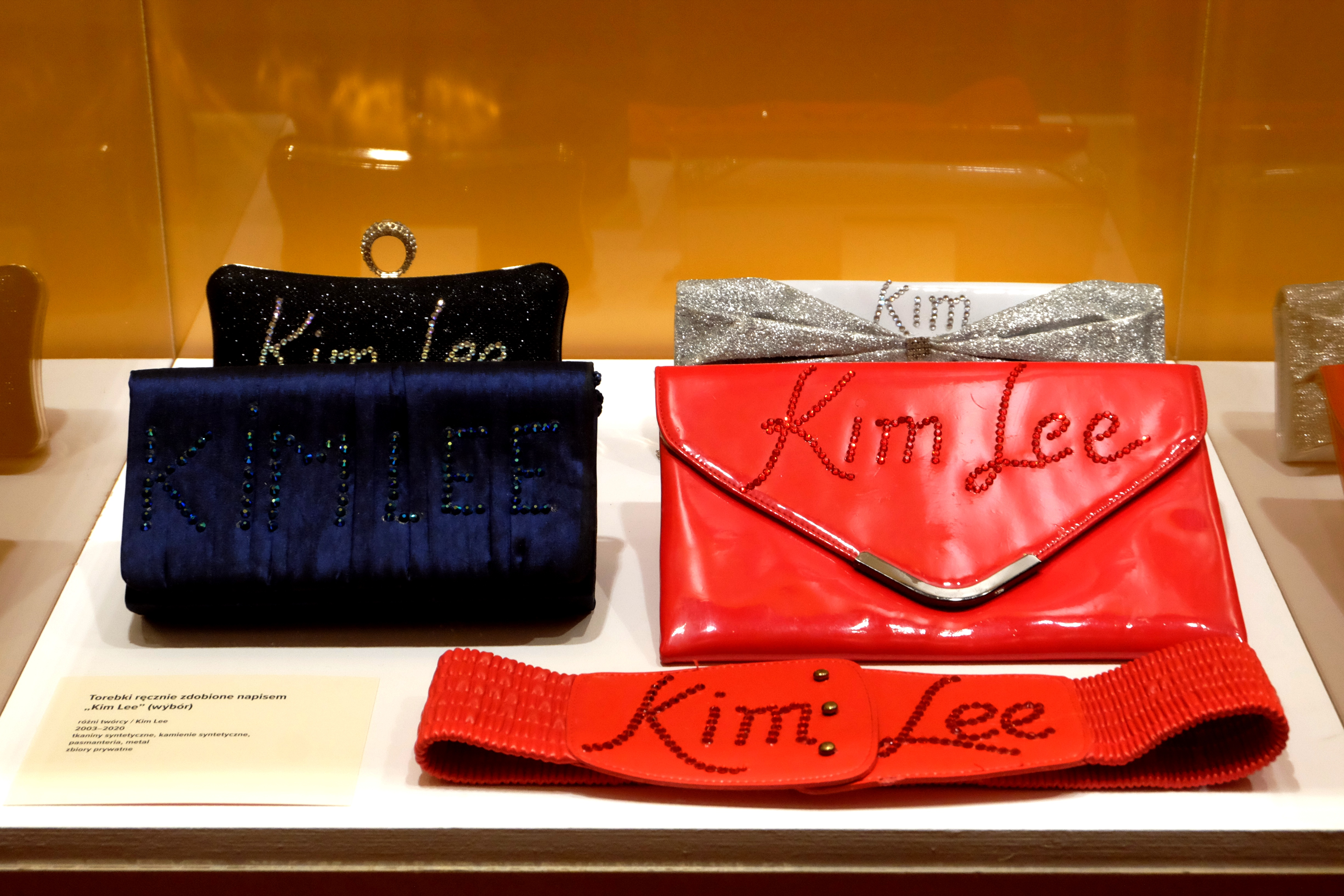
Kim Lee's purses as exhibited at the Wola Museum in Warsaw

In 2012, on the occasion of the 10th anniversary of activity on the drag queen scene, Kim Lee was placed on the cover of the bimonthly magazine Replika. In 2013, a documentary film about Kim Lee, “kim jest Kim? “ (who is Kim?), was directed by Remigiusz Szeląg with the participation of Kinga Dunin. Kim Lee also starred in the DOC LAB POLAND award-winning documentary "Boyleska" (Boylesque), directed by Bognay Kowalczy in 2018. Her biography appeared, among others, in the book Słodko-kwaśna historia czyli wszystko, co chcieliście kupić w wietnamskich sklepach, ale baliście się zapytać autorstwa (Sweet and Sour History or Everything You Wanted to Buy in Vietnamese Stores, but Were Afraid to Ask) by Dorota Podlaska and Tuong Ngo Van.

The character of Kim Lee was also an inspiration for writers, including Kaja Malanowska, who portrayed a character inspired by Kim Lee in one of the stories in the volume Immigracje published by Wydawnictwo Krytyki Politycznej in 2011. A character inspired by Kim Lee also appears in the novel by Ignacy Karpowicz entitled Ości.

In 2023, the Wola Museum in Warsaw held an exhibition entitled Kim Lee. Queen of Warsaw (February 2 – July 30, 2023). In addition to the costumes, the exhibition featured photos and films documenting Kim Lee's stage identities.
