= Filipinki =

All-girl vocal group from Poland

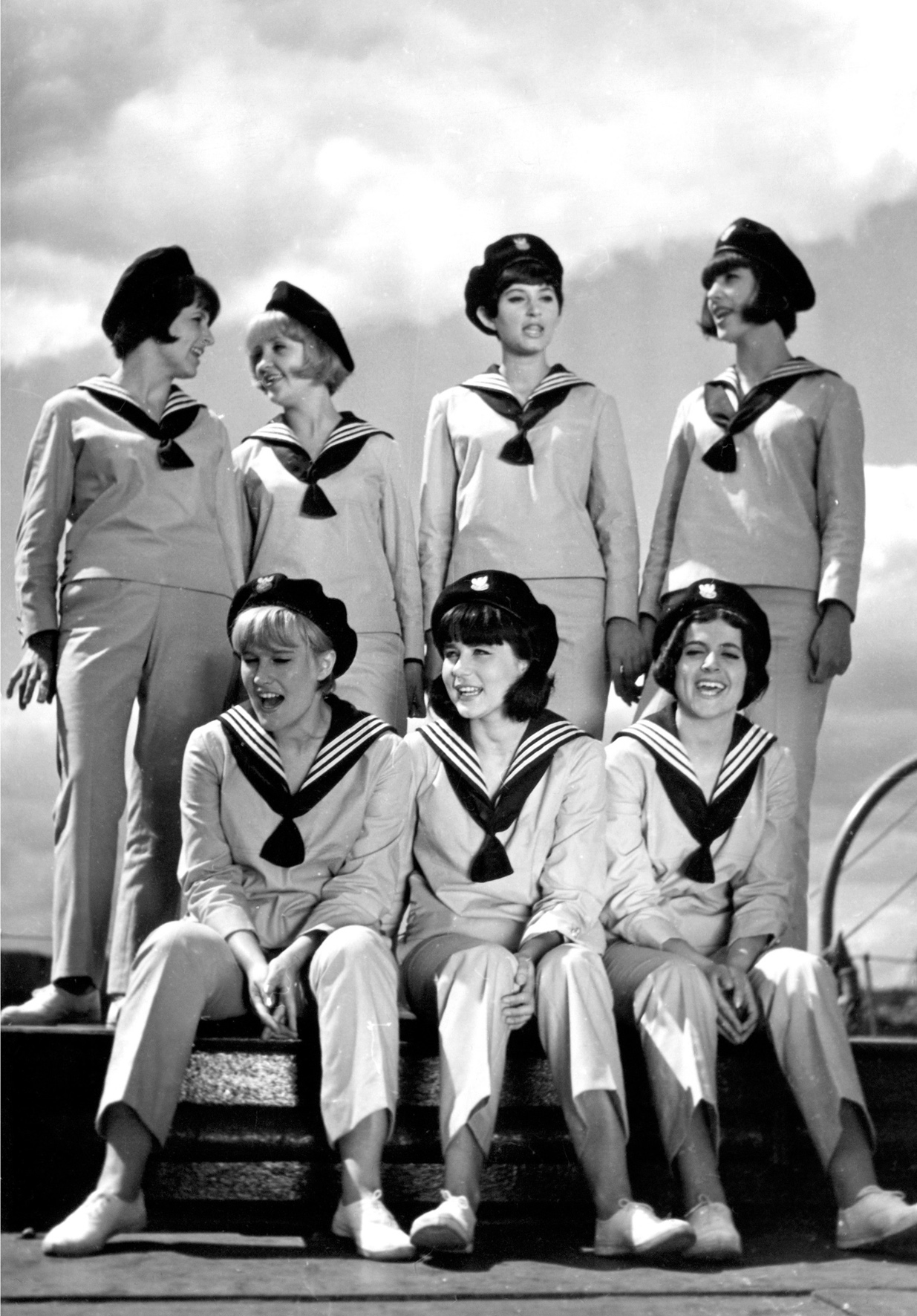
- Filipinki in the Polish movie The Navy is a Men's Adventure (1966)

Background information
- Origin: Szczecin, Poland
- Genres: Pop, jazz, doo-wop, beat, rock, psychedelic pop
- Years active: 1959–1974
- Labels: Polskie Nagrania Muza; Pronit; Veriton (Polish record label); Melodiya; Bruno Records (USA record label); Radio Request Records (USA record label); Melodia Record Co. (USA record label)
- Past members: Zofia Bogdanowicz; Niki Ikonomu; Elżbieta Klausz; Krystyna Pawlaczyk; Iwona Racz; Krystyna Sadowska; Anna Sadowa

Filipinki were the first Polish all-girl vocal group and also Poland's leading female band of the 1960s.

== Career ==
Filipinki were founded in October 1959 at an economic college in Szczecin and became popular in Poland through exposure at music festivals and other events during the years that followed. They named themselves after popular teen girl magazine Filipinka.

By 1963, they were well-established but the big breakthrough came with their Wala Twist, a playful song celebrating female cosmonaut Valentina Tereshkova, who became the first woman into space aboard Vostok 6 in June 1963. Wala Twist quickly became a hit in Poland and the Soviet Union. In the same year Filipinki released their first EP vinyl record in the Soviet Union and two more EPs in Poland. Just in 1964 their Polish EPs sold over 704,740 copies (N-0298: 353,240 copies and N-0299: 351,500 copies). The group became extremely popular both domestically and in all countries of the Eastern Bloc, becoming one of the first teen musicians acts to appear regularly on Polish, Soviet Union and GDR television programs. In the mid-1960s they were called The Beatles Girls by Polish media.

In 1965, Filipinki became first Eastern Bloc young musicians to tour overseas, in Canada and the United States. They performed concerts, among others, in the cities: Toronto, Ottawa, Montreal, New York City, Minneapolis, Chicago, Detroit, Pittsburgh, Philadelphia and Baltimore. They returned to America in 1966 for the next three-month tour. Filipinki also released three vinyl records in Canada and the US; two LPs and one EP.

In 1968, Filipinki reduced the group from seven to five vocalists, changed their image and revamped as a rock band.

The group disbanded in November 1974 after a 15-year run. Their success made it possible for future Polish teenage musicians and girl bands to find mainstream success.

== Discography ==
Format	Year	Country	Title	Record Label
LP	1965	Poland	Rozśpiewani rówieśnicy (Teenagers Songs)	Polskie Nagrania Muza L0454
LP	1965	USA	Piosenka nie zna granic (Music Has No Bounds)	Melodia Record Co. LPM1025
LP	1966	Poland	Filipinki - to my (We Are Filipinki Girls)	Polskie Nagrania Muza XL0323
LP	1966	USA	Filipinki with orchestra under J. Janikowski in their Top 16 Hits. A Polish A GO-GO	Bruno Records BR10214L
EP	1963	USSR	Filipinki	Melodiya PD 33GD 00881
EP	1964	Poland	Wala Twist	Polskie Nagrania Muza N0298
EP	1964	Poland	Filipinki to my (We Are Filipinki Girls)	Polskie Nagrania Muza N0299
EP	1965	Poland	Tarap tarap	Pronit N0361
EP	1965	USA	Filipinki	Radio Request Records M-40
EP	1968	Poland	Nie ma go (He Isn't Here)	Polskie Nagrania Muza N0529
EP	1968	Poland	Kolędy śpiewają Filipinki (Christmas Carol by Filipinki)	Veriton V350
EP	1969	Poland	Wiosna majem wróci (Spring Will Return in May)	Pronit N0572
EP	1971	Poland	Ja się w tobie nie zakocham (I Will Not Fall in Love With You)	Polskie Nagrania Muza N0653
SP	1966	Poland	Serwus, panie chief (Hello Mr. Chief)	Polskie Nagrania Muza SP251
SP	1965	USSR	Батуми (Batumi); Мы Филипинки (orig. Filipinki - to my = We Are Filipinki Girls)	Melodiya 0044573/0044574
SP	1965	USSR	Валентина (orig. Wala Twist = Valentina Twist); Пити-пити (Pity, pity)	Melodiya 0044575/0044576
SP	1967	USSR	Tylko raz (Just Once)	Melodiya 0045419
SP	1971	Poland	Królewski Zamek (King's Castle)	Polskie Nagrania Muza SP357
Cardboard record (official)	1966	Poland	Filipinki i Chochoły: Znajdź sobie dziewczynę (Find Yourself a Girlfriend)	Ruch R0030
Cardboard record (official)	1966	Poland	Serwus, panie Chief (Hello Mr. Chief)	Ruch R0036
Cardboard record (official)	1969	Poland	Wiosna majem wróci (Spring Will Return in May)	Polskie Nagrania Muza KP137
Cardboard record (official)	1971	Poland	Królewski zamek (King's Castle)	Ruch R0315
Greatest Hits	1993	Poland	Filipinki - największe przeboje	Polskie Nagrania Edition Ltd. ECD 018
Greatest Hits	2003	Poland	Filipinki - to my	Polskie Nagrania Muza PNCD 540
Greatest Hits	2004	Poland	Platynowa kolekcja. Filipinki. Złote przeboje	GM Records 222 005-2
Greatest Hits	2005	Poland	Platynowa kolekcja. Filipinki - nasze złote przeboje	Media Way Sp. z o.o. 2-0020
Greatest Hits	2008	Poland	Z archiwum Polskiego Radia vol. 4. Filipinki. Nagrania radiowe z lat 1963-1972	Polskie Radio SA PRCD 1078-79
Greatest Hits	2010	Poland	Filipinki	Polskie Nagrania Muza PNCD 1339
Greatest Hits	2012	Poland	Złote lata polskiej piosenki. Filipinki	Gazeta Wyborcza, Agora SA
Greatest Hits	2013	Poland	Filipinki - to my! niepublikowane nagrania z lat 1962-1971	Latarnik/AS AS01
Greatest Hits	2014	Poland	Złota kolekcja. Filipinki. Batumi. Własny świat	Warner Music Poland 08256 4 61914 8 2

== Bibliography ==
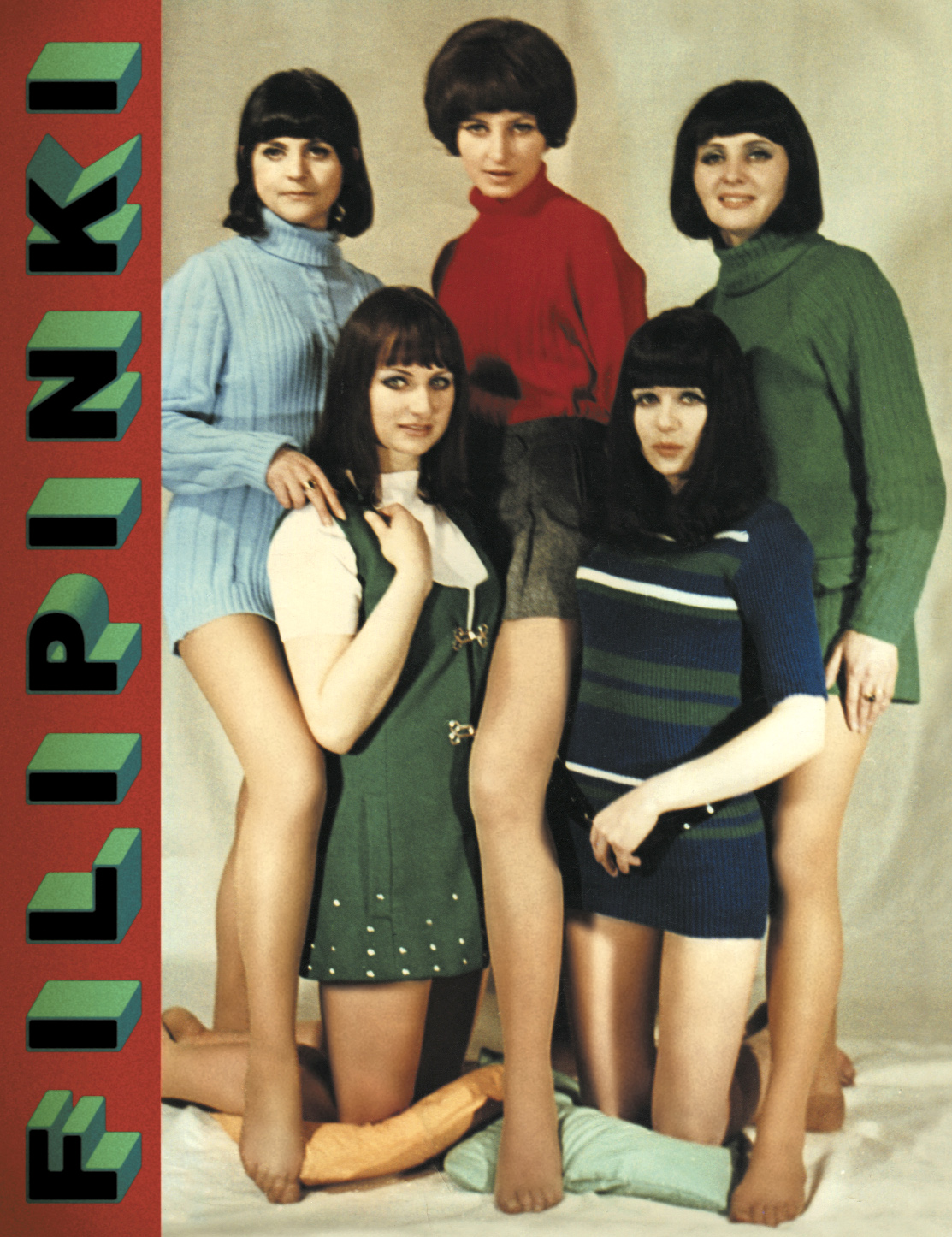
Promotional poster for Filipinki Boys Are Liars Tour (from January till June 1970)

In November 2013, a biography of the band by Marcin Szczygielski entitled We are Filipinki! Illustrated History of First Polish Girlsband (ISBN 978-83-2681277-4) was released in Poland.
