= Maja Heban =

Polish journalist, activist (born 1990)

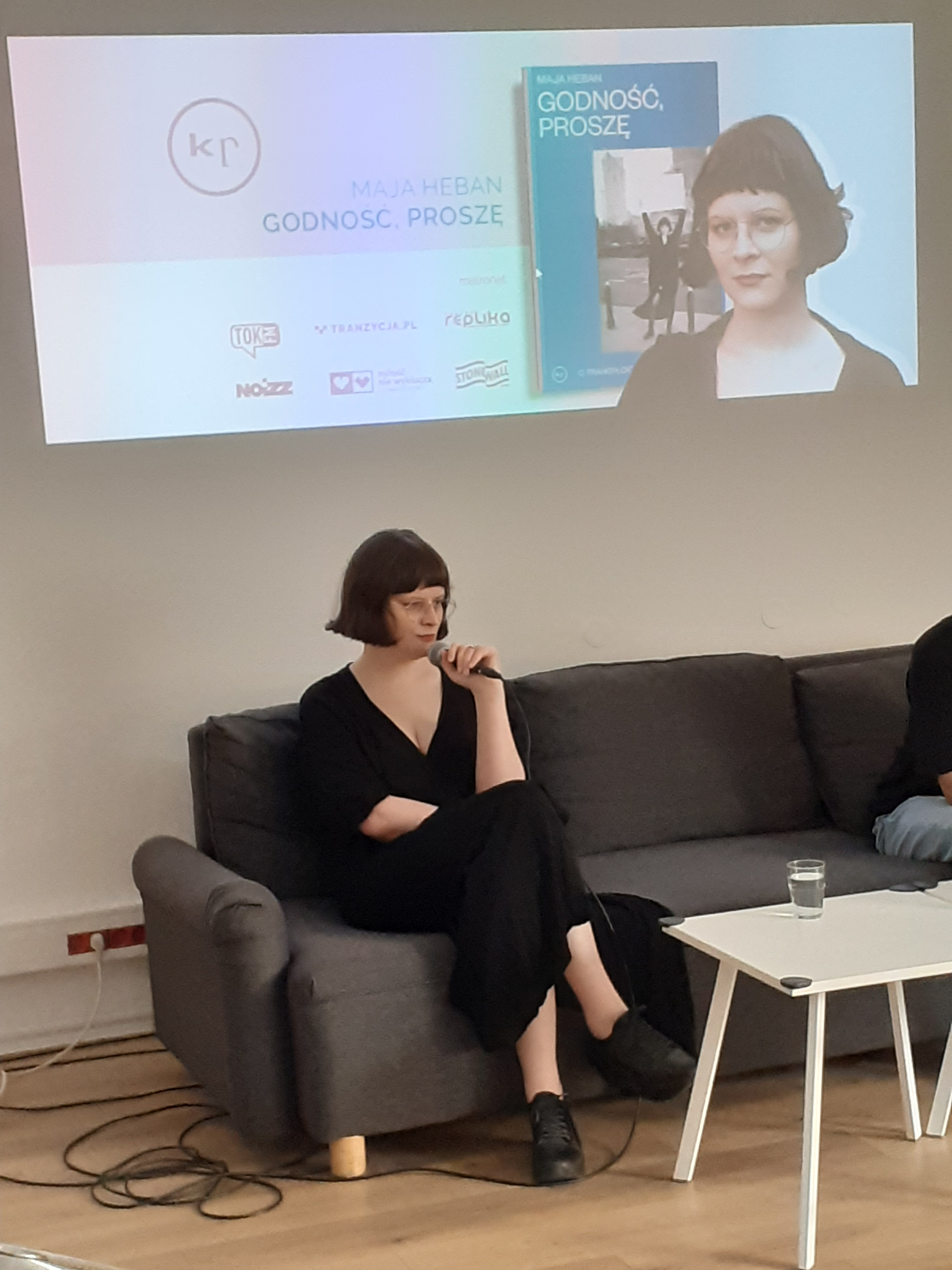
- Maja Heban, 2023
- Born: 1990 (age 35–36)
- Citizenship: Polish
- Occupations: activist, journalist

Maja Heban (born 1990) is a Polish transgender rights activist and journalist.

== Biography ==
She grew up in a village near Jasło. She is a cultural studies graduate. She made a gender transition. She published as a columnist in the Replika magazine. In 2021 she received Korony Równości award from the Kampania Przeciw Homofobii. In 2023, her book Godność, proszę. O transpłciowości, gniewie i nadziei was published by the Wydawnictwo Krytyki Politycznej. She appeared in the 2023 calendar Dumne. Polskie ikony LBTQ+ (Proud. Polish LGBTQ+ Icons) published by Replika.

After Maja Heban called Magdalena Grzyb a “TERF”, Magdalena Grzyb filed a lawsuit against Maja Heban for infringement of personal rights. Łukasz Sakowski testified in court as a witness in the case.
