= Tomasz Raczek =

Film critic (born 1957)

- Tomasz Raczek in 2025
- Born: 15 June 1957 (age 69)
- Occupation: Film critic

Tomasz Raczek (born 15 June 1957) is a film critic and journalist.

== Biography ==
In the years 1990–2000, together with Zygmunt Kałużyński, he hosted a television series on TVP2 entitled Perły z lamusa, in which films were presented and discussed.

He is gay; his life partner is Marcin Szczygielski.
