= Sylwia Chutnik =

Polish writer, feminist and social activist (born 1979)

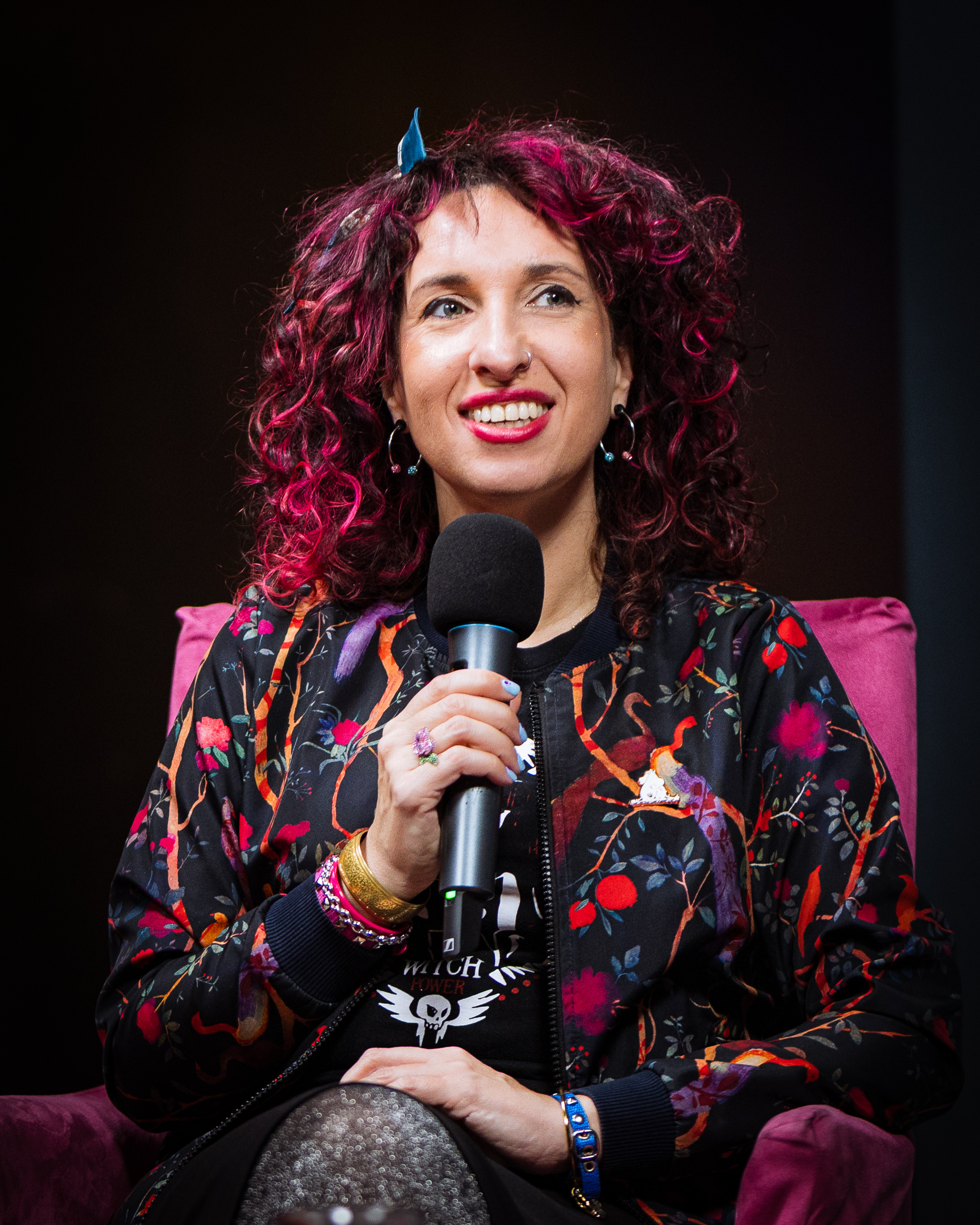
- Sylwia Chutnik (2025)
- Born: 1979 (age 45–46); Warsaw, Poland
- Occupations: novelist, writer, social activist
- Awards: Paszport Polityki (2008)

Sylwia Chutnik (born 1979 in Warsaw) is a Polish novelist, writer, feminist and social activist.

== Life ==
Chutnik graduated in gender studies at Warsaw University. In 2018, she defended her PhD at the Institute of Polish Culture at Warsaw University. In 2020, she came out in an interview for an LGBTQIA magazine "Replika", talking about her long-term relationship with a man, subsequent relationship with a woman, and being a non-heteronormative mother in Poland.

== Career ==
Her debut novel Kieszonkowy atlas kobiet ("Pocket Atlas of Women") was published in 2008. Her second novel Dzidzia ("Diddums") came out in 2010. She is also a Warsaw city guide and a charity worker. She has published a Warsaw guidebook, called Warszawa kobiet ("Women's Warsaw") which guides people around the lesser known parts of the city where famous women used to live.

She is the chairperson of MaMa Foundation which aims to improve the situation of mothers' rights in Poland. Chutnik is a member of an informal group "8 March Women's Coalition".

In her works, she focuses on feminism and gender issues, Polish culture and history.

Chutnik is a member of The Polish Writers' Association. She hosted a TV literary programme "Cappuccino z książką" (Cappuccion and a book), and "Zapomniani-odzyskani" (Forgotten- found).

She has been writing columns to a weekly magazine "Polityka" since 2016. Chutnik writes a column in "Gazeta Stołeczna" and a women's magazine "Pani".

== Awards ==
Chutnik was recognized by many institutions for her literary achievements as well as social work. She was awarded by Ashoka for her social work. It is a so-called social workers' Nobel. She is a laureate of the Lady of Warsaw 2007 competition, and won the Wawoactive 2008 contest. Chutnik has been nominated for the Nike Literary Award three times so far. In 2009, she became the laureate of Paszport Polityki Award for her literary works. She became a scholarship holder of Homines Urbani (2008), a laureate of the Lithuanian Books Institute (2009), a laureate of the Ministry of Culture and National Heritage (2010), the City of Warsaw (2010), and the Goethe Institute (2010).

== Books ==
- Kieszonkowy atlas kobiet, (Pocket Atlas of Women) Kraków 2008 (translated into Czech, German, Lithuanian, Russian, Slovak)
- Dzidzia, (Diddums) Warszawa 2009
- Warszawa kobiet, (Women's Warsaw) Warszawa 2011
- Mama ma zawsze rację, (Mum's Always Right), Warszawa 2012
- Cwaniary, (The Hustlers), Warszawa 2012
- W krainie czarów, (In the World of Magic), Kraków 2014
- Jolanta, Kraków 2015
- Smutek cinkciarza, (The Sadness of a Shylock), Warszawa 2016.
- Kobiety, które walczą: Rozmowy z zawodniczkami sztuk walki, (Women Who Fight: Interviews With Martial Arts Athletes), Warszawa 2017
- Dino Bambino, 2018 (with illustrations by Mirella von Chrupek)
- Miasto zgruzowstałe. Codzienność Warszawy w latach 1954- 1955, Wrocław 2020
- Tyłem do kierunku jazdy, 2022
