= Marcin Szczygielski =

Polish writer, journalist and graphic designer

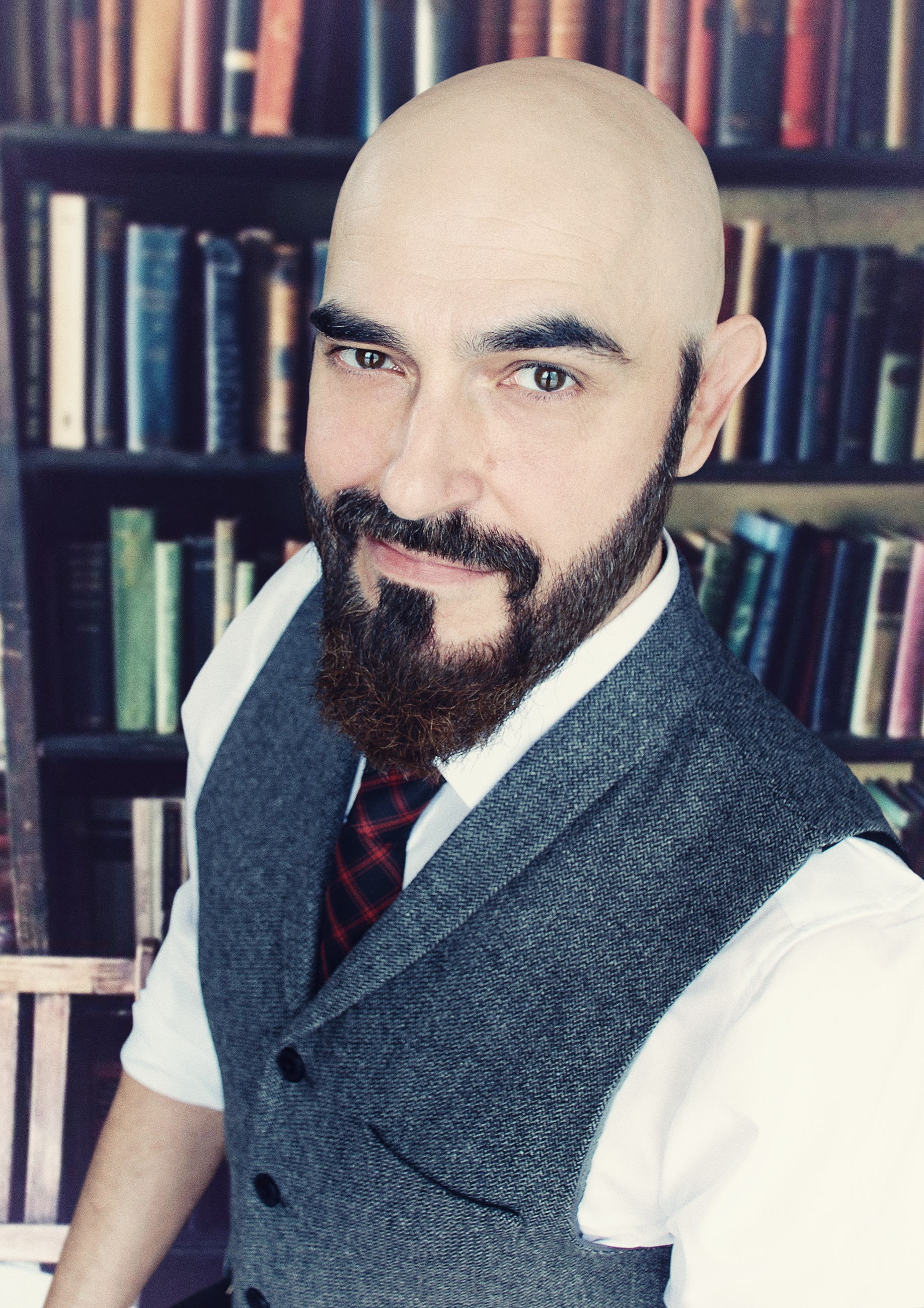
- Born: Marcin Paweł Szczygielski; 28 May 1972 (age 54); Warsaw, Poland
- Occupation: Writer
- Writing career
- Period: 2003 to present
- Genres: Historical fiction, speculative fiction, science fiction, satire, children's fiction

Marcin Szczygielski (born 1972) is a Polish writer, journalist and graphic designer. He is an author of theatrical plays, and novels for adults and teenagers. Since December 2012, he has been a member of Stowarzyszenie Pisarzy Polskich (Polish Writers' Association).

== Biography ==
Szczygielski was born in Warsaw to actor Cezary Szczygielski and singer Iwona Racz-Szczygielska, vocalist of Polish girlsband Filipinki. His parents divorced while he was still a child and his mother raised him.

Szczygielski is openly gay and lives in Warsaw with his partner (since 1994) Tomasz Raczek, a journalist and film critic.

== Career ==
His debut was PL-BOY (published 2003), a fictional, humorous account of the Polish Edition Playboy magazine editorial department of which Szczygielski used to be the art director. The novels that followed – Wiosna PL-BOYa (2004), Nasturcje i cwoki (2005) and Farfocle namietnosci (2006) – established him as one of the most-read authors of popular literature in Poland. Berek (2007) tells a story of a difficult friendship between an elderly lady - a conservative Catholic and her young neighbour, openly gay. The novel immediately hit the bestseller list. Its spinoff, titled Bierki, was published in 2010. In 2011 Poczet Krolowych Polskich (The Queens Saga) was published, which is claimed to be Szczygielski's most mature and most ambitious novel. This elaborate, multigenerational family saga that portrays the contemporary Polish history through the lives of women of 4 generations, was nominated for the Srebrny Kałamarz Literary Prize.

A separate part of Marcin Szczygielski's literary output are books aimed towards younger readers. Each of them has received numerous awards and recognition awards in literary contests, whereas novels Czarny Mlyn and Za niebieskimi drzwiami have been incorporated into the extracurricular reading list in Polish elementary schools.

Szczygielski's theatrical plays have been staged in many Polish theatres – among others in the cities of Warsaw, Łódź, Płock and Kraków.

== Books ==
Aimed towards adult readers:

- PL-BOY, novel (Instytut Wydawniczy Latarnik, 2003) ISBN 83-917891-1-X
- Wiosna PL-BOYa, novel (Instytut Wydawniczy Latarnik, 2004) ISBN 83-91789-1-52
- Kuchnia na ciezkie czasy, cookbook (Instytut Wydawniczy Latarnik, 2004) ISBN 978-83-60000-48-9
- Nasturcje i Cwoki, novel (Instytut Wydawniczy Latanik, 2005) ISBN 83-60000-03-4
- Farfocle namietnosci, novel (Instytut Wydawniczy Latarnik, 2006) ISBN 978-83-60000-36-6
- Berek / Tag, novel (Instytut Wydawniczy Latarnik, 2007) ISBN 978-83-63841-15-7
- Bierki, novel (Instytut Wydawniczy Latarnik, 2010) ISBN 978-83-63841-29-4
- Furie i inne groteski, theatrical plays (Instytut Wydawniczy Latarnik, 2011) ISBN 978-83-60000-68-7
- Poczet Krolowych Polskich / The Queens Saga, novel (Instytut Wydawniczy Latarnik, 2011) ISBN 978-83-60000-79-3
- Kallas, theatrical play (Instytut Wydawniczy Latarnik, 2011) ISBN 978-83-60000-95-3
- Filipinki – to my!, monograph of Filipinki, a Polish girlsband (Agora SA, 2013) ISBN 978-83-2681-277-4
- Sanato, novel (Instytut Wydawniczy Latarnik, 2014) ISBN 978-83-63841-27-0
- Bingo, novel (Instytut Wydawniczy Latarnik, 2015) ISBN 978-83-63841-30-0

Aimed towards young readers:

- Omega, novel (Instytut Wydawniczy Latarnik, 2009) ISBN 978-83-60000-32-8
- Za niebieskimi drzwiami / Behind the Blue Door / Hinter der blauen Tür, novel (Poland – Instytut Wydawniczy Latarnik, 2010 ISBN 978-83-63841-20-1 / Germany – S. Fischer Verlag GmbH, 2016 ISBN 978-3-7373-5372-4)
- Czarny Mlyn / The Black Mill, novel (Stentor, 2011) ISBN 978-83-61245-64-3
- Czarownica pietro nizej, novel (Bajka, 2013) ISBN 978-83-61824-58-9
- Arka Czasu / Ark of Time / Flügel aus Papier / Ковчег часу, novel (Poland – Stentor, 2013 ISBN 978-83-6346-215-4 / Germany – S. Fischer Verlag GmbH, 2015 ISBN 978-3-7373-5212-3 / Ukraine – Urbino, 2016 ISBN 978-3-7373-5372-4)
- Tuczarnia motyli, novel (Bajka, 2014) ISBN 978-83-6182-478-7
- Teatr Niewidzialnych Dzieci, novel (Instytut Wydawniczy Latarnik, 2016) ISBN 978-83-63841-38-6
- Klątwa dziewiątych urodzin, novel (Bajka, 2016) ISBN 978-83-65479-05-1
- Serce Neftydy, novel (Instytut Wydawniczy Latarnik, 2017) ISBN 978-83-63841-42-3

Theatrical plays:

- Berek, czyli upior w moherze. Premiere: Warsaw – 2009
- Wydmuszka. Premieres: Warsaw – 2010; Plock – 2011; Lodz – 2011; Cracow – 2014; Prague – 2016
- Furie. Premiere: Warsaw – 2011
- Kallas. Premiere: Warsaw – 2012
- Single i Remiksy. Premiere: Warsaw – 2012
- Kochanie na kredyt. Premiere: London – 2013

== Awards and honors ==
- Omega – recognition award in Halina Skrobiszewska Children's Literature Contest and incorporation into the Museum of Children's Books Treasure List, 2010
- Omega – recognition award in the Most Beautiful Books of the Year 2009 Contest organized by the Polish Association of Book Publishers
- Czarny Mlyn – Grand Prix in the Second Astrid Lindgren Literary Contest, 2010
- Czarny Mlyn – 1st Prize in the Second Astrid Lindgren Literary Contest, category: novels for children aged 10–14, 2010
- Omega – Book of the Year 2010 in the contest organized by the Polish section of IBBY - International Board on Books for Young People, 2011
- Za niebieskimi drzwiami – Duzy Dong (previously Children's Bestseller of the Year) – 1st Prize awarded by the Professional Jury in Dong literary contest organized by the Polish section of IBBY, 2011
- Za niebieskimi drzwiami – Children's Jury recognition award in Dong literary contest (previously Children's Bestseller of the Year) organized by the Polish section of IBBY, 2011
- Za niebieskimi drzwiami – 2nd Prize in Halina Skrobiszewska Children's Literature Contest and incorporation into the Museum of Children's Books Treasure List, 2011
- Poczet Krolowych Polskich / The Queens Saga – nomination for Srebrny Kałamarz Literary Prize in the Konstanty Ildefons Gałczyński Literary Contest, 2012
- Za niebieskimi drzwiami – the novel incorporated into the international IBBY Honour List presenting the most outstanding children's books, 2012
- Arka Czasu – Grand Prix in the 3rd Astrid Lindgren Literary Contest for children's and teenager's books, 2013
- Arka Czasu – 1st Prize in the 3rd Astrid Lindgren Literary Contest, category: novels for children aged 10–14, 2013
- Czarownica pietro nizej – Book of April 2013 according to Magazyn Literacki Książki
- Arka Czasu – recognition award in the Book of the Year 2013 Literary Contest organized by the Polish section of IBBY, 2013
- Czarownica pietro nizej – Zielona Gaska 2013 Literary Prize awarded by Konstanty Ildefons Gałczyński Foundation, 2014
- Arka Czasu – 1st Prize in Halina Skrobiszewska Children's Literature Contest and incorporation into the Museum of Children's Books Treasure List, 2014
- Guliwer w Krainie Olbrzymów (Gulliver in the Land of Giants) 2014 Literary Prize for significant and lasting contributions to children's literature awarded by a Polish magazine about children's literature Guliwer, 2014
- Flügel aus Papier (German edition of Arka Czasu) – chosen one of the best seven books for young adults in Germany in April 2015 by Deutschlandfunk, 2015
- Flügel aus Papier – Book of July 2015 by Deutsche Akademie für Kinder- und Jugendliteratur, 2015
- Tuczarnia motyli – 1st Prize in Halina Skrobiszewska Children's Literature Contest and incorporation into the Museum of Children's Books Treasure List, 2015
- Flügel aus Papier – Kinderbuchpreis 2015, Children's Book of the Year in Austria by Jury der Jungen Leser, 2015
- Teatr Niewidzialnych Dzieci – 1st Prize in the 4th Astrid Lindgren Literary Contest, category: novels for children aged 10–14, 2016
- Teatr Niewidzialnych Dzieci – recognition award in the Book of the Year 2016 Literary Contest organized by the Polish section of IBBY, 2016.
- Klatwa dziewiatych urodzin – Book of the Year 2016 in the contest organized by the Polish section of IBBY, 2016.
- Klatwa dziewiatych urodzin – Book of December 2016 according to Magazyn Literacki Książki, 2016.
- Bronze Medal for Merit to Culture – Gloria Artis for distinguished contributions to the Polish culture and national heritage
- Klatwa dziewiatych urodzin – Warsaw Literary Prize, 2017.
