= Kornhauser =

Kornhauser is a German surname. Notable people with the name include:

- Agata Kornhauser-Duda (born 1972), née Kornhauser, First Lady of Poland
- Aleksandra Kornhauser Frazer (1926-2020), Slovenian chemist
- Arthur Kornhauser (1896–1990), American industrial psychologist
- Eddie Kornhauser (1918–2006), Australian property developer
- Jakub Kornhauser (born 1984), Polish poet
- Julian Kornhauser (born 1946), Polish poet and literary critic
