= Bill Johnston (translator) =

Polish language literary translator

Bill Johnston (born 1960) is a prolific Polish language literary translator and professor of comparative literature at Indiana University. His work has helped expose English-speaking readers to classic and contemporary Polish poetry and fiction.

== Life ==
Bill Johnston read Modern Languages at the University of Oxford (University College) and graduated in 1982. He earned his Ph.D. in Second Language Acquisition from the University of Hawaiʻi at Mānoa.

== Career ==
In 2008 Johnston received the Found in Translation Award for his translation of new poems by Tadeusz Różewicz. The book was also a finalist for the National Books Critics Circle Poetry Award.

In 1999 he was awarded a National Endowment for the Arts Creative Writing Fellowship for Poetry (Translation) for Balladina by Juliusz Słowacki, and in 2005 a National Endowment for the Humanities Fellowship for a translation of The Coming Spring by Stefan Żeromski.

He has received an Amicus Poloniae award, presented by the Ambassador of the Republic of Poland (2003); a Diploma of the Polish Foreign Ministry (2004); and the Officer's Order of Merit of the Republic of Poland (2012) for outstanding contribution to the promotion of Polish culture and language in the U.S., and the development of Polish-American cultural cooperation.

In 2005 his translation of Magdalena Tulli's Dreams and Stones won the Translation Award of AATSEEL (the American Association of Teachers of Slavic and East European Languages).

His translation of Stone Upon Stone by Wiesław Myśliwski won the 2012 PEN Translation Prize, the 2012 Best Translated Book Award, and the AATSEEL Book Award for Best Literary Translation into English.

== Awards and honors ==
- 2019: AATSEEL Best Literary Translation Award for Pan Tadeusz by Adam Mickiewicz
- 2014–2017: Henry Remak Endowed Professorship, Indiana University
- 2014: Transatlantyk Prize for the promotion of Polish literature abroad
- 2014: Tadeusz Walendowski Prize, awarded by the Polish Library in Washington
- 2014: Wiesław Myśliwski’s A Treatise on Shelling Beans shortlisted for the National Translation Award
- 2013–2014: Guggenheim Foundation Fellowship
- 2013: Lannan Foundation Residency
- 2012: AATSEEL (American Association of Teachers of Slavic and East European Languages) Award for Best Literary Translation into English, for Stone Upon Stone by Wiesław Myśliwski
- 2012: Officer's Cross of the Order of Merit, awarded by the President of the Republic of Poland
- 2012: AATSEEL Translation Award for Wiesław Myśliwski's Stone Upon Stone
- 2012: PEN Translation Prize for Wiesław Myśliwski's Stone Upon Stone
- 2012: Best Translated Book Award (Fiction) for Wiesław Myśliwski's Stone Upon Stone
- 2012: Magdalena Tulli’s In Red shortlisted for Best Translated Book Award (Fiction)
- 2010: Jerzy Pilch’s The Mighty Angel long-listed for Best Translated Book Award (Fiction)
- 2009: Eugeniusz Tkaczyszyn-Dycki’s Peregrinary a finalist for Best Translated Book Award (Poetry)
- 2008: Found in Translation Award for new poems by Tadeusz Różewicz
- 2008: Tadeusz Różewicz's new poems a finalist for the National Books Critics Circle Poetry Award.\
- 2005: Translation Prize of AATSEEL (American Association of Teachers of Slavic and East European Languages) for Dreams and Stones by Magdalena Tulli
- 2005: National Endowment for the Humanities Fellowship, for a translation of The Coming Spring by Stefan Żeromski
- 2004: Diploma of the Polish Foreign Ministry
- 2003: Amicus Poloniae award, presented by the Ambassador of the Republic of Poland
- 1999–2001: National Endowment for the Arts Creative Writing Fellowship for Poetry (Translation) for Balladina by Juliusz Słowacki

== Translations ==
=== Books ===
- Adam Mickiewicz: Pan Tadeusz. New York: Archipelago Books. 2018.
- Julia Fiedorczuk: Selected Poems. Brookline, Massachusetts; Zephyr Books. In progress.
- Tomasz Różycki: Twelve Stations. Brookline, Massachusetts: Zephyr Books. 2015.
- Stanisław Lem: The Invincible. Pro Auctore. 2014.
- Wiesław Myśliwski: A Treatise on Shelling Beans. New York: Archipelago Books. 2013. (shortlisted for the National Translation Award)
- Magdalena Tulli: In Red. New York: Archipelago Books. 2011. (shortlisted for Best Translated Book Award 2012: Fiction)
- Andrzej Stasiuk: Dukla. Champaign, Illinois: Dalkey Archive. 2011.
- Stanisław Lem: Solaris. Newark, New Jersey: Audible.com (audiobook). 2011.
- Wiesław Myśliwski: Stone Upon Stone. New York: Archipelago Books.
- Andrzej Stasiuk: Fado. Champaign, Illinois: Dalkey Archive Press.
- Juliusz Słowacki: Balladina. Newcastle upon Tyne: Cambridge Scholars Publishing.
- Jerzy Pilch: The Mighty Angel. Rochester, New York: Open Letter.
- Eugeniusz Tkaczyszyn-Dycki: Peregrinary. Brookline, Massachusetts: Zephyr Books. 2008.
- Magdalena Tulli: Flaw. New York, New York: Archipelago Books. 2007.
- Jan Kochanowski: The Envoys. Kraków, Poland: Księgarnia Akademicka. 2007.
- Stefan Żeromski: The Coming Spring. London: Central European University Press. 2007.
- Tadeusz Różewicz: new poems. New York, New York: Archipelago Books. 2007.(winner of 2008 Found in Translation Award)(finalist for the National Book Critics Circle Poetry Award, 2008).
- Andrzej Stasiuk: Nine. New York, New York: Harcourt Brace. 2007.
- "The Song of Igor's Campaign" (from Old Russian). New York, New York: Ugly Duckling Presse. 2006.
- Magdalena Tulli: Moving Parts. New York, New York: Archipelago Books. 2005.
- Krzysztof Kamil Baczyński: White Magic and Other Poems. Los Angeles, California: Green Integer. 2005.
- Witold Gombrowicz: Polish Memories. New Haven, Connecticut: Yale University Press. 2004.
- Witold Gombrowicz: Bacacay. New York, New York: Archipelago Books. 2004.
- Magdalena Tulli: Dreams and Stones. New York, New York: Archipelago Books. 2004.(winner of 2005 AATSEEL Translation Award)
- Gustaw Herling: The Noonday Cemetery and Other Stories. New York, New York: New Directions. 2003.(Los Angeles Times Notable Book of the Year, 2003)
- Jerzy Pilch: His Current Woman. Evanston, Illinois: Northwestern University Press/Hydra Books. 2002.
- Stefan Żeromski: The Faithful River. Evanston, Illinois: Northwestern University Press. 1999.
- Andrzej Szczypiorski: The Shadow Catcher. New York: Grove Press. 1997.
- Bolesław Prus: The Sins of Childhood and Other Stories. Evanston, Illinois: Northwestern University Press. 1996.
- Maria Hochberg-Mariańska and Noe Grüss (Eds.): The Children Accuse. London: Vallentine Mitchell. 1996.
- Andrzej Szczypiorski: Self-Portrait with Woman. New York: Grove Press. 1995.

=== Short pieces ===
- Andrzej Stasiuk: Dog. In New England Review, forthcoming.
- Magdalena Tulli: What is Art For? (Interview). In The White Review, January 2015.
- Julia Fiedorczuk: Five Poems. World Literature Today, November–December 2014. pages 30–32.
- Andrzej Stasiuk: Asia: Shade and Shadow. In Continents, February 2014.
- Andrzej Stasiuk: Kyrgyzstan. Words Without Borders, January 2014.
- Tomasz Różycki: A Grandson Returns. In Little Star 4, pages 144-177. 2012.
- Stanisław Lem: A Puzzle. In VICE, 19/9. 2012.
- Andrzej Stasiuk: Lublin. In Citybooks. 2012.
- Wiesław Myśliwski: Stone Upon Stone (extract). Absinthe, 14, pages 10–24. 2011.
- Teatr Ósmego Dnia: The Files (play). To appear in: Carol Martin & Richard Schechner (Eds.), In Performance. New York: Seagull Books. In press.
- Andrzej Stasiuk: Dukla (extract). Words Without Borders, 2010.
- Julia Fiedorczuk: Five poems. In PRECIPICe, 3/1-2, 2009.
- Dariusz Suska: Fifteen poems. In Jacek Dehnel (Eds.), Six Polish Poets, pages 46–65. London: Arc Publications. 2008.
- Eugeniusz Tkaczyszyn-Dycki: Five poems. In Modern Poetry in Translation, 3/10, pages 159–162. 2008.
- Eugeniusz Tkaczyszyn-Dycki: “Carriers on the steps of the cathedral” (poem). In Seneca Review, 38/2, page 67. 2008.
- Krzysztof Koehler: Two poems. In: Wayne Miller & Kevin Prufer (Eds.), New European Poets, pages 181–182. Minneapolis, Minnesota: Graywolf. 2008.
- Eugeniusz Tkaczyszyn-Dycki: Two poems. In: Wayne Miller & Kevin Prufer (Eds.), New European Poets, page 179. Minneapolis, Minnesota: Graywolf. 2008.
- Magdalena Tulli: Flaw (extract). Edinburgh Review, 121, pages 84–90. 2007.
- Magdalena Tulli: Blemish (aka Flaw) (extract). Agni, 65, pages 180–188. 2007.
- Tadeusz Różewicz: words (poem). The Nation, February 22, 2007, page 34.
- Juliusz Słowacki: Balladina (extract). Przekładaniec, 2/2005, pages 40–63.
- Tadeusz Różewicz: Four poems. Words without Borders, September 2005.
- Eugeniusz Tkaczyszyn-Dycki: three poems. Words without Borders, September 2005.
- Andrzej Sosnowski: From "Zoom". Lyric Review, 8, pages 66–69. 2005.
- Eugeniusz Tkaczyszyn-Dycki: Two poems. Lyric Review, 8, pages 79. 2005.
- Krzysztof Koehler: "Mass at Four". Lyric Review, 8, pages 36–40. 2005.
- Julia Fiedorczuk: "While for those who yearn". Lyric Review, 8, page 16. 2005.
- Wojciech Bonowicz: Three poems. Lyric Review, 8, pages 13–14. 2005.
- Magdalena Tulli: Parts of Speech (Moving Parts) (extract). Agni, 61, pages 208–222. 2005.
- Magdalena Tulli: Parts of Speech (Moving Parts) (extract). Ninth Letter, 2/1, pages 17–21. 2005.
- Witold Gombrowicz: Polish Memories (extract). Theater Magazine, 34/3, pages 34–63. 2004.
- Witold Gombrowicz: The Memoirs of Stefan Czarniecki. Georgia Review, 58/3, pages 670–681. 2004.
- Witold Gombrowicz: The Rat. New England Review, 25/1-2, pages 78–86.
- Witold Gombrowicz: Adventures. Words Without Borders, August 2004.
- Jerzy Pilch: The Mighty Angel (extract). Words Without Borders, March 2004. At:
- Magdalena Tulli: Dreams and Stones (extract). ). Words Without Borders, March 2004.
- Mariusz Grzebalski: Six poems. In M. Baran (Ed.): Carnivorous Boy and Carnivorous Bird: Poems by Polish Poets Born After 1958, pages 297–307. Brookline, Massachusetts: Zephyr Press. 2004.
- Krzysztof Koehler: Six poems. In M. Baran (Ed.): Carnivorous Boy and Carnivorous Bird: Poems by Polish Poets Born After 1958, pages 147–159. Brookline, Massachusetts: Zephyr Press. 2004.
- Tadeusz Pióro: Four poems. In M. Baran (Ed.): Carnivorous Boy and Carnivorous Bird: Poems by Polish Poets Born After 1958, pages 58–65. Brookline, Massachusetts: Zephyr Press. 2004.
- Johnston, B. Introduction: The poetry of Krzysztof Kamil Baczyński. In Krzysztof Kamil Baczyński, White Magic and Other Poems (B. Johnston, trans.). Los Angeles, CA: Green Integer. In press.
- Krzysztof Kamil Baczyński: Three poems. Mr. Knife, Miss Fork, no. 2: an Anthology of International Poetry, August 2003.
- Jerzy Pilch: Old Kubica and the darkness; Filarecka St. Przekadaniec, special issue 2001, pages 124–134.
- Magdalena Tulli: In Red (extract). Przekładaniec, special issue 2001, pages 210–224.
- Mariusz Grzebalski: Two poems. Przekładaniec, special issue 2001, pages 236–239.
- Krzysztof Koehler: Three poems. Przekładaniec, special issue 2001, pages 190–195.
- Jerzy Pilch: Filarecka St. (extract from essay). Aufbau, 20, October 2000.
- Jerzy Pilch: Heart in mouth (essay). Chicago Review, 46/3–4, pages 285–290. 2000.
- Włodzimierz Odojewski: Extract from Oksana. Chicago Review, 46/3–4, pages 126–130. 2000.
- Magdalena Tulli: Extract from In Red. Chicago Review, 46/3–4, pages 255–262. 2000.
- Tadeusz Pióro: Two poems. Chicago Review, 46/3–4, pages 222–223. 2000.
- Krzysztof Koehler: Crucifixion (poem). Two Lines: Crossings, pages 98–101. 2000.
- Krzysztof Kamil Baczyński: Five poems. Przekładaniec, 6, pages 32–41. 2000.
- Jerzy Pilch: Other Pleasures (chapters 1, 3, 13). Partisan Review, 67/1, pages 72–82. 2000.
- Jerzy Pilch: Other Pleasures (chapters 4-6). 2B, 14, pages 201–210. 1999.
- Lech Wałęsa: Letter to my grandson. In Liv Ullman (Ed.), Letter to my Grandchild (pages 106–107). New York: Grove Press. 1998.
- Krzysztof Kamil Baczyński: Evil lullaby (poem). eXchanges, 10, pages 90–91. 1998.
- Adam Zagajewski: Długa Street. TriQuarterly, 100, pages 288–294. 1997.
