= Grotz =

Grotz is a German language habitational surname for someone living by a pine forest. Notable people with the name include:

- Jennifer Grotz (1971), American poet and translator
- Zac Grotz (1993), American professional baseball pitcher
