= Mamiko =

Polish publishing house

MaMiKo is a Polish publisher located in Nowa Ruda, a medieval town. The town has a strong literary tradition, and hosts the “Góry Literatury” annually.

MaMiKo was founded in 2000 by Apolonia Maliszewska. The name MaMiKo is a combination of the first two letters of Magda, Milena, and Kornel; which are the names of her children. Since 2000 over 300 books have been published by MaMiKo. The publishing house specializes in poetry and fiction.

== Poets and Authors ==
Selected poets and authors published by MaMiKo include: Wojciech Giedrys, Tomasz Pułka, Elżbieta Lipińska, Grzegorz Mucha, Szymon Bira, Dagmara Babiarz, Hubert Klimko-Dobrzaniecki, Piotr Florczyk, Samantha Kitsch, Grzegorz Kwiatkowski, Michał Sobol, Marta Fox and Jakub Tabaczek.

== Books ==
While MaMiKo specializes in poetry and fiction it also publishes nonfiction. Some notable nonfiction works published by MaMiKo are: Poza kadrem by Feliks Netz, Otwórz oczy by Dagmara Babiarz, Znad Niemna przez Odrę nad Sekwanę by Marian Dziwniel, and the Polish translation of Jogging by Ukrainian author Andrij Bondar, which was translated by Bohdan Zadura and Adam Wiedemann.

== Literary awards ==
Authors that were published by MaMiKo who were either nominated for or won literary awards can be listed as:

- Wojciech Giedrys was the first-prize winner of the National Literary Contest Złoty Środek Poezji 2005 for Best Poetic Debut in 2004 for his volume of poetry Ścielenie i grzebanie.
- Dawid Majer was the first-prize winner of the National Literary Contest Złoty Środek Poezji 2010 for Best Poetic Debut in 2009 for his volume of poetry Księga grawitacji.
- Dawid Majer was nominated for the Silesius Literary Award 2010 in the category Debut of the Year for his volume of poetry Księga grawitacji.
- Maciej Bieszczad was the third-prize winner of the National Literary Contest Złoty Środek Poezji 2011 for Best Poetic Debut in 2010 for his volume of poetry Elipsa.
- Tomasz Pietrzak was nominated for the Nike Literary Award 2013 for his volume of poetry Rekordy.
- Piotr Tomczak got an honourable mention of the National Literary Contest Złoty Środek Poezji 2014 for Best Poetic Debut in 2013 for his volume of poetry Miłość, miłość, zapałki, książkii ikra.
- Zyta Bętkowska was the first-prize winner of the National Literary Contest Złoty Środek Poezji 2017 for Best Poetic Debut in 2016 for her volume of poetry Dwa chutory.
- Jakub Domoradzki was nominated for the Orfeusz K. I. Gałczyński Literary Award 2017 for his volume of poetry Wiersze, których nie lubii mój tata.
- Jakub Tabaczek was nominated for the Witold Gombrowicz Literary Award 2019 for his short story collection Czytajcie, co jest wam pisane.
- Robert Jóźwik was the third-prize winner of the XV Artur Fryz National Literary Contest 2019 for Best Debut in 2018 for his volume of poetry Obiecuję ci niewidzialność.
