= Michał Sobol =

Polish poet (born 1970)

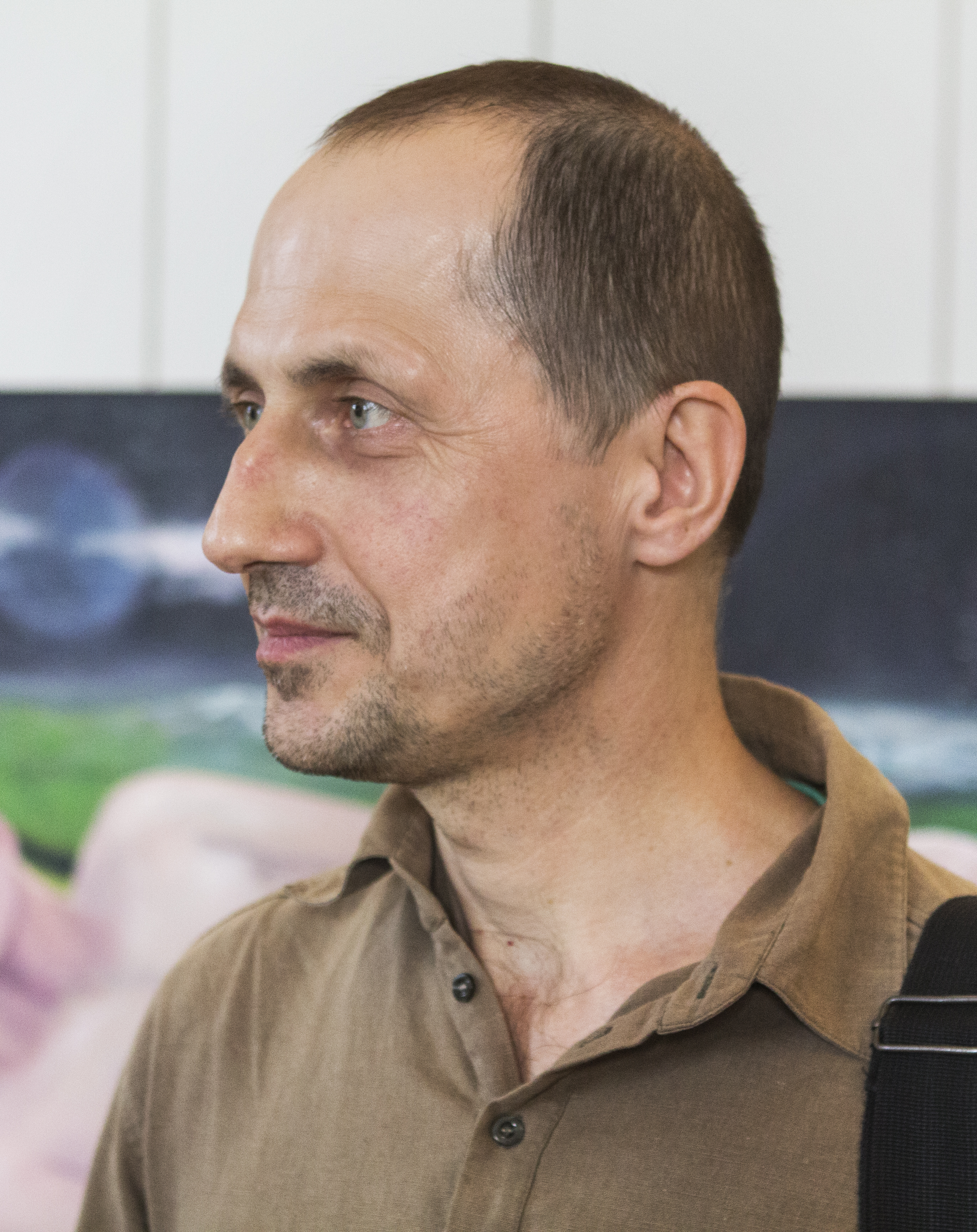
- Michał Sobol, 2022
- Born: 1970 (age 55–56); Cerekiew
- Citizenship: Polish
- Occupation: Poet
- Awards: Kazimiera Iłłakowiczówna Award (2001), Gdynia Literary Prize (2014), Kraków Book of the Month Award (February 2024)

Michał Sobol (born 1970 in Cerekiew near Radom) is a Polish poet.

== Poetry books ==
- Lamentacje. Kraków: Wydawnictwo Zielona Sowa. 2001.
- Działania i chwile. Nowa Ruda: Mamiko. 2007.
- Naturalia. Kraków: Wydawnictwo Miniatura. 2010.
- Pulsary. Warszawa: Wydawnictwo Nisza. 2013.
- Schrony. Warszawa: Wydawnictwo Nisza. 2016.
- Wieść. Warszawa: Wydawnictwo Nisza. 2019.
- Trasy przelotów. Warszawa: Wydawnictwo Nisza. 2023.

== Accolades ==
He won the Kazimiera Iłłakowiczówna Award for the best debut book of 2001 for Lamentacje. For his volume Pulsary he received the 2013 Radom Literary Award in the literary book category and was nominated for the 2014 Wisława Szymborska Award and the 2014 Gdynia Literary Prize. In 2016, by decision of the jury composed of Ryszard Krynicki, Paweł Próchniak and Adam Zagajewski, he received the Zbigniew Herbert Foundation Award for Polish Poet. In 2017 he received the Gdynia Literary Prize for his volume Schrony. In February 2024 he received the Kraków Book of the Month Award award for his volume Trasy przelotów.
