= Wisława Szymborska Award =

Polish annual literary award

- Awarded for: best poetry book
- Country: Poland
- Presented by: The Wisława Szymborska Foundation
- Reward: PLN 200,000 ($50,000)
- First award: 2013
- Website: https://www.szymborska.org.pl/projekty/nagroda-im-wislawy-szymborskiej/

The Wisława Szymborska Award is a Polish annual international literature prize presented by the Wisława Szymborska Foundation. It was established in 2013, and was named in honour of the Nobel Prize-winning poet Wisława Szymborska (1923–2012).

It is awarded to authors of best poetry works published the previous year. Both books written in Polish and translated into Polish are eligible for the award and can be submitted by the authors themselves, publishing houses, cultural institutions as well as members of the award committee. The award carries a cash prize of PLN 200,000 ($50,000) for the winner and PLN 50,000 ($15,000) for the translator, which makes it one of the most valued literary prizes in Poland.

== Laureates ==
=== 2021 ===
Nominations:

- Anna Adamowicz for Animalia
- Justyna Bargielska for Dziecko z darów
- Jakub Kornhauser for Dziewięć dni w ścianie
- Joanna Mueller and Joanna Łańcucka for Waruj
- Michał Sobol for Wieść

Winner: Anna Adamowicz

=== 2020 ===
Nominations:

- Genowefa Jakubowska-Fijałkowska for Rośliny mięsożerne
- Adam Kaczanowski for Zabawne i zbawienne
- Tomasz Różycki for Kapitan X
- Mirka Szychowiak for Uwaga, obiekt monitorowany
- Urszula Zajączkowska for Piach

Winner: Genowefa Jakubowska-Fijałkowska

=== 2019 ===
Nominations:

- Kamila Janiak for Wiersze przeciwko ludzkości ("Poems Against Humanity")
- Piotr Janicki for Psia książka ("Dog's Book")
- Marzanna Bogumiła Kielar for Nawigacje ("Navigations")
- Robert Król for Polka
- Marta Podgórnik for Mordercze ballady ("The Murderous Ballades")

Winner: Marta Podgórnik

=== 2018 ===
Nominations:

- Wojciech Bonowicz for Druga ręka
- Julia Fiedorczuk for Psalmy. 2014–2017
- Natalia Malek for Kord
- Marta Podgórnik for Zimna książka ("The Cold Book")
- Ilona Witkowska for Lucyfer zwycięża

Winner: Julia Fiedorczuk

Best translation winner: Linn Hansen for Przejdź do historii (Sweden)

=== 2017 ===
Nominations:

- Tomasz Bąk for [beep] generation
- Jerzy Kronhold for Skok w dal ("Long Jump")
- Tomasz Różycki for Litery ("Letters")
- Marcin Sendecki for W
- Eugeniusz Tkaczyszyn-Dycki for Nie dam ci siebie w żadnej postaci

Winner: Marcin Sendecki

=== 2016 ===
Nominations:

- Jakub Kornhauser for Drożdżownia ("The Yeast Factory")
- Edward Pasewicz for Och, Mitochondria
- Marta Podgórnik for Zawsze ("Always")
- Joanna Roszak for Tego dnia ("On That Day")
- Marcin Świetlicki for Delta Dietla ("Dietl's Delta")

Winner: Jakub Kornhauser

=== 2015 ===
Nominations:

- Roman Honet for Świat był mój ("The World Was Mine")
- Jakobe Mansztajn for Studium przypadku ("The Case Study")
- Mirosław Mrozek for Horyzont zdarzeń ("The Horizon of Events")
- Jacek Podsiadło for Przez sen ("Through a Dream")
- Maciej Robert for Księga meldunkowa ("The Registration Book")

Winner: ex aequo Roman Honet and Jacek Podsiadło

=== 2014 ===
Nominations:

- Wojciech Bonowicz for Echa ("Echoes")
- Jacek Dehnel for Języki obce ("Foreign Languages")
- Mariusz Grzebalski for W innych okolicznościach ("In Other Circumstances")
- Julia Hartwig for Zapisane
- Michał Sobol for Pulsary ("Pulsars")

Winner: Julia Hartwig

=== 2013 ===
Nominations:

- Justyna Bargielska for Bach for my baby
- Krystyna Dąbrowska for Białe krzesła ("White Chairs")
- Łukasz Jarosz for Pełna krew ("Full Blood")
- Krzysztof Karasek for Dziennik rozbitka ("Journals of a Castaway")
- Jan Polkowski for Głosy ("Voices")

Winner: ex aequo Krystyna Dąbrowska and Łukasz Jarosz

== See also ==
- Nike Award
- Silesius Poetry Award
- Polish literature
- List of Polish-language poets
