= Andriy Lyubka =

Ukrainian poet, essayist, and translator (born 1987)

- Ukrainian: Андрій Любка
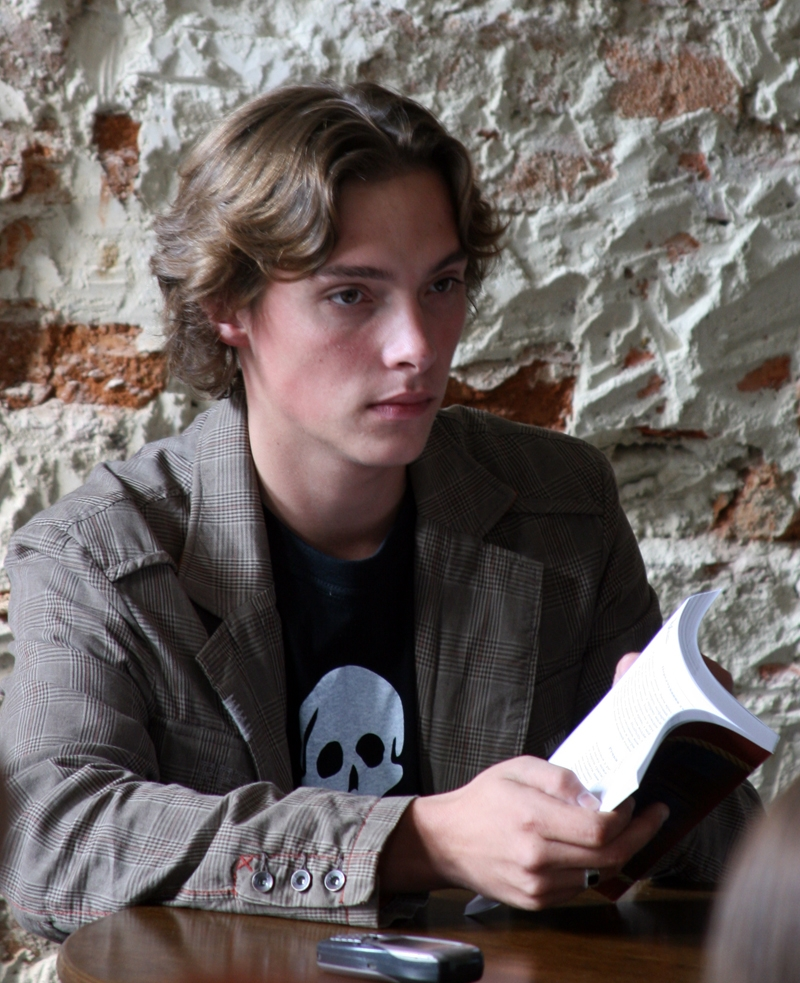
- Andriy Lyubka
- Born: 3 December 1987 (age 38); Riga, Latvian SSR, Soviet Union
- Education: Uzhhorod National University
- Occupations: prose writer, poet, essayist, translator
- Spouse: Yulia Lyubka
- Writing career
- Language: Ukrainian
- Notable awards: Shevelov prize of PEN Ukraine (2017)

Andriy Lyubka (Ukrainian: Андрій Любка, born 3 December 1987 in Riga, Latvia) is a Ukrainian poet, essayist, and translator. He grew up in Vynohradiv, in South-Western Ukraine, and then enrolled at the Uzhhorod National University, where he studied Ukrainian Philology. His second master's degree in Balkan Studies was received from Warsaw University in 2014. Lyubka currently lives in Uzhhorod.

== Literary work ==
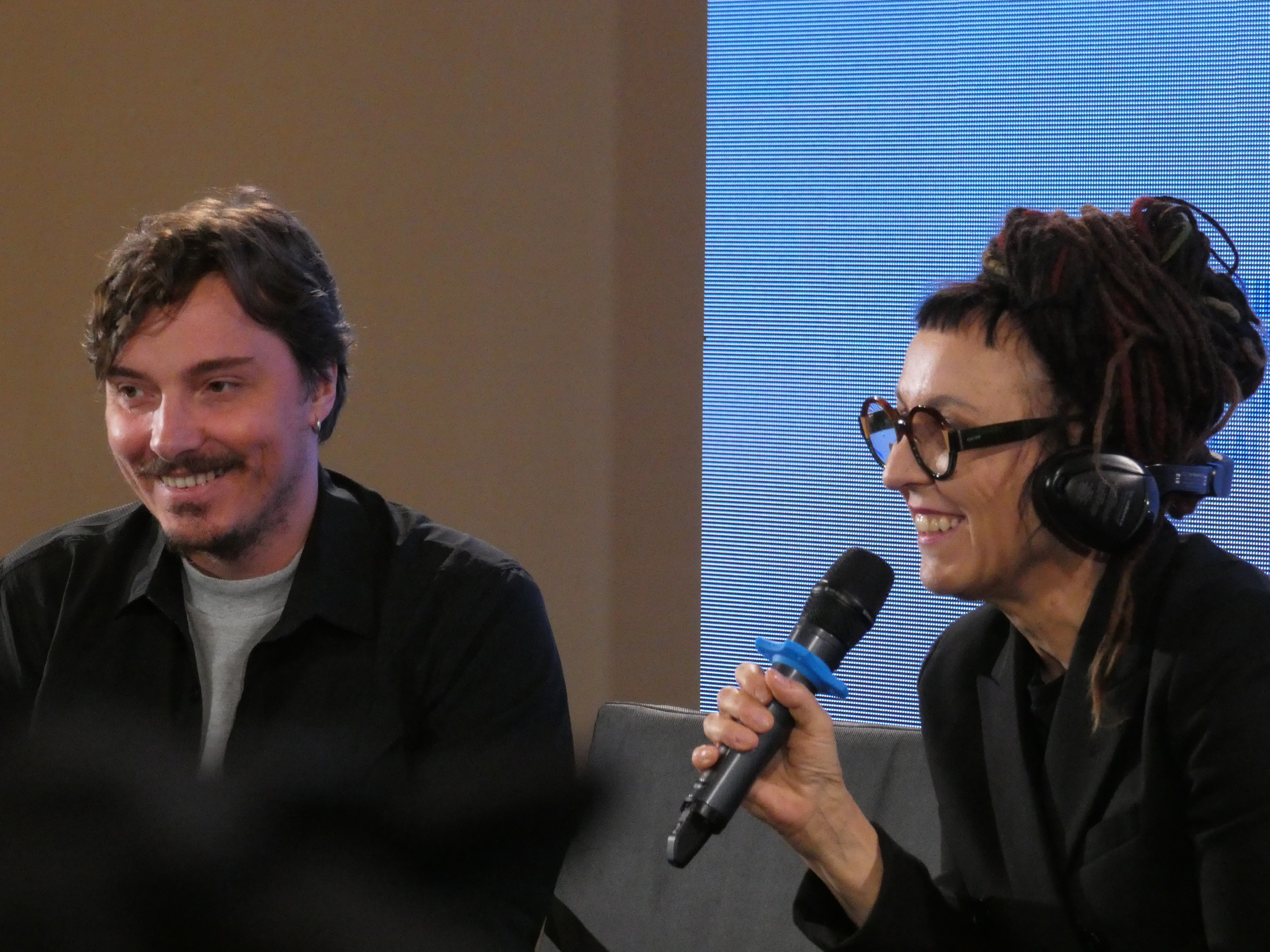
‘We Are Not on an Island’: a conversation between Andriy Lyubka and Olga Tokarczuk, winner of the 2018 Nobel Prize in Literature and guest of honour at the Arsenal Book Festival

Lyubka is the author of four collections of poetry, one book of short stories, Saudade, and six novels. His novel Carbide depicts the daily life of smugglers in Zakarpattia Oblast. He also translates prose and poetry from Polish, Serbian, Bosnian, Croatian, and English. Additionally, he is a columnist for Ukrainian and European journals, Newspapers and media outlets, Nowa Europa Wschodnia / New Eastern Europe, Radio Free Europe/Radio Liberty, Den'', zbruc.eu, and kontrakty.ua,

== Publications ==
=== Poetry ===
- Eight Months of Schizophrenia (Вісім місяців шизофренії). Uzhhorod 2007.
- Terrorism (ТЕРОРИЗМ). Uzhhorod 2008.
- Forty Bucks Plus Tip (Сорок баксів плюс чайові). Chernivtsi 2012.
  - Notaufnahme. German transl. of poems by Team.BAES-low-lectured. BAES, Innsbruck 2012.
- (together with DJ Dimka Special-K) Before the explosion we will kiss (Перед вибухом поцілуємося). 2012.

=== Prose ===
- Killer (КІЛЕР. Збірка історій). Lviv, Piramida, 2012. 2nd augm. edition Killer+. Knyhy-XXI / Meridian Czernowitz 2018.
  - Killer. Transl. by Bohdan Zadura. Biuro literackie, Wroclaw 2013.
- Sleeping with women (Спати з жінками). Chernivtsi, Knyhy-XXI / Meridian Czernowitz 2014.
- Karbid. Chernivtsi, Knyhy-XXI / Meridian Czernowitz 2015.
  - Karbid. Polish Transl. by Bohdan Zadura. Warsztaty Kułtury, Lublin 2016.
  - Carbide. English Transl. by Reilly Costigan-Humes and Isaac Stackhouse Wheeler. London 2020.
  - Karbidas. Lithuanian Transl. by Donata Rinkevičienė. Sofoklis. Vilnius 2021
- A Room for Sorrow (Кімната для печалі). Chernivtsi, Knyhy-XXI / Meridian Czernowitz 2016.
  - Pokój do smutku. Polish Transl. by Bohdan Zadura. Lublin 2018.
- Saudade (Саудаде). Chernivtsi, Knyhy-XXI / Meridian Czernowitz 2017.
- Your glance, Cio-Cio-San (Твій погляд, Чіо-Чіо-сан)? Knyhy-XXI / Meridian Czernowitz 2018.
- Evening in Istanbul (Вечір у Стамбулі) Knyhy-XXI / Meridian Czernowitz 2025.

Lyubka's prose and poetry has been translated into Chinese, Czech, Dutch, English, German, Lithuanian, Macedonian, Polish, Portuguese, Romanian, Russian, Serbian, Slovak, Slovene and Turkish.

== Book translations ==
Translations from Polish

- Bohdan Zadura, Night life (Ukrainian title: Нічне життя). Piramida, Lviv (2012)
- Bohdan Zadura, Worst behind (Ukrainian title: Найгірше позаду). Knyhy-XXI, Chernivtsi (2015)
- Lidia Ostałowska, Farby wodne (Ukrainian title: Акварелі). Knyhy-XXI, Chernivtsi (2014)

Translation from Serbian

- Srđan Valjarevič, Комо. Knyhy-XXI, Chernivtsi (2016)
- Svetislav Basara, The Cyclist Conspiracy (Ukrainian title: Фама про велесопедистів). Knyhy-XXI, Chernivtsi (2017)

Translation from Bosnian

- Muahrem Bazdulj, Konzert. Knyhy-XXI, Chernivtsi (2018)

== Articles in English ==
- In Search of Barbarians, in: Issue 6/2016 of New Eastern Europe, pp. 21–28, also online
- Has the war really changed Ukrainians?, in: Issue 5/2017 of New Eastern Europe, pp. 63–69.
- A barbarian in the besieged city, in: Issue 5/2018 of New Eastern Europe, pp. 63–69, also online

== Interviews ==
- Russia is the problem (in German)
- I am atheist - for me death is the end (in Ukrainian)
- Vogue Interview from 03. Dezember 2016, also online
- Literature supports us in a way, in: Apofenie 16. September 2018, online

== Curator ==
- Curator of Kyiv Laurels, an international poetry festival (Kyiv, Ukraine)
- Curator of Meridian Czernowitz, an international poetry festival (Chernivtsi, Ukraine)

== Writer in residence ==
Lyubka has been writer-in-residence at cultural institutes in Poland, Latvia, Romania, Hungary, Sweden and Austria. In 2017 he received the CEI Fellowship for writers in Fellowship and stayed in Slovenia.

== Awards ==
- Yuri Shevelov Award of PEN Ukraine for Saudade (2017)
- Kovaliv Foundation literary prize (2017)
- Kyiv Laurels (2011)
- Debut (2007)

== Secondary literature ==
- P. M. Khodanych, Art. Lyubka, Andriy, in: Encyclopedia of Modern Ukraine vol. 18 (2017) p. 306, also online
- Reilly Costigan-Humes, Ukrainian Literature's Boy Wonder Goes West, in: The Odessa Review January Issue 2018, also online

== See also ==
- List of Ukrainian-language writers
- List of Ukrainian literature translated into English
