= Jerzy Jarniewicz =

Polish poet (born 1958)

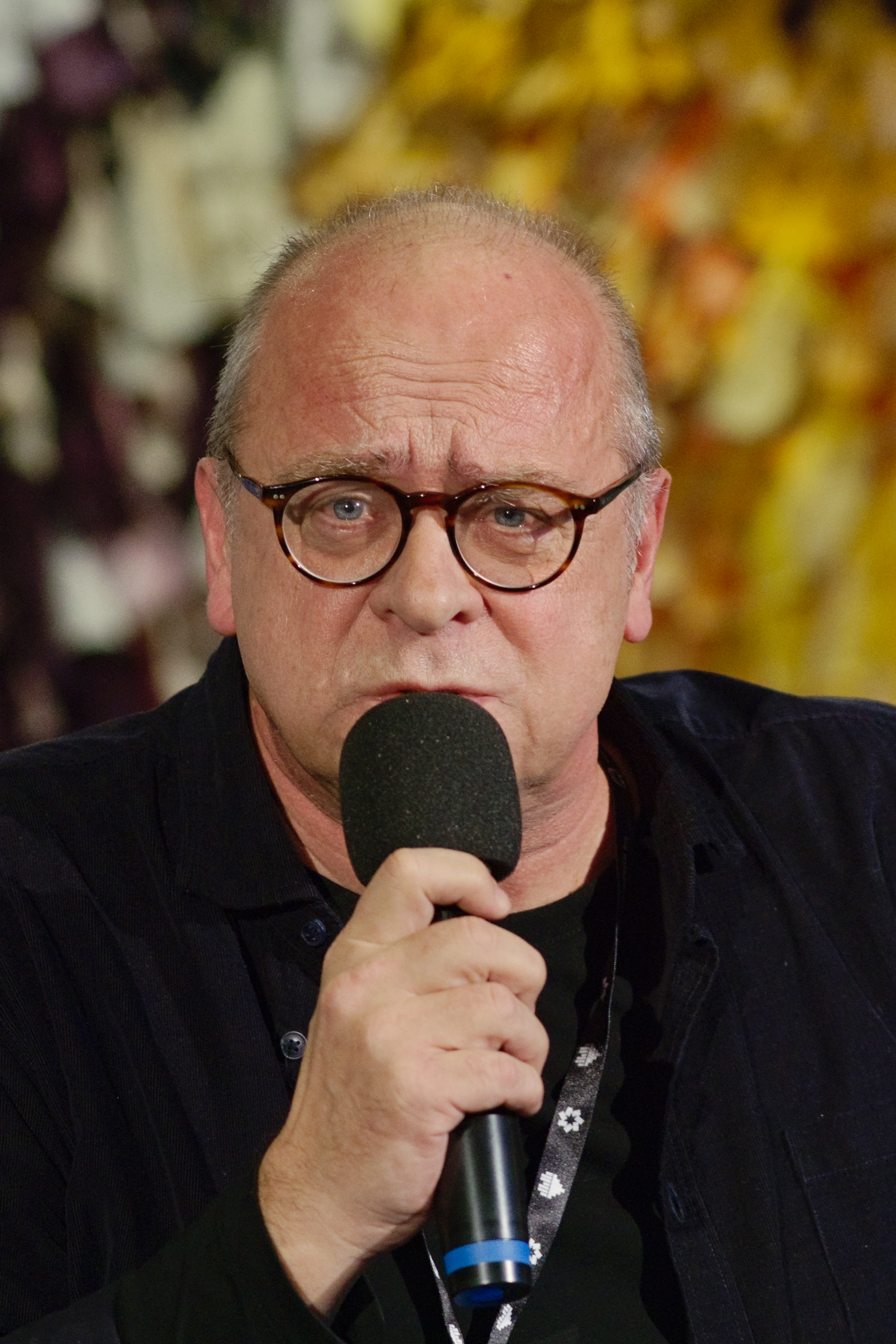
- Jarniewicz in 2024
- Born: 4 May 1958 (age 68); Łowicz, Poland
- Education: University of Łódź
- Occupations: poet, literary critic, translator, essayist
- Writing career
- Language: Polish; English
- Genre: fiction
- Notable work: Mondo Cane (2021)
- Notable awards: Silesius Poetry Award (2018); Nike Award (2022)

Jerzy Jarniewicz (Polish pronunciation: [ˈjɛʐɨ jarˈɲɛvit͡ʂ]; born 4 May 1958) is a Polish poet, literary critic, translator and essayist. He was awarded the 2022 Nike Award, the most important distinction in Polish literature as well as the Medal for Merit to Culture – Gloria Artis (2006).

== Life and career ==
Born in Łowicz in 1958, he is a graduate of the Bolesław Prus High School No. 21 in Łódź. He studied English language and literature as well as philosophy at the University of Łódź and between 1984 and 1985 at the University of Oxford. He is an editor of the literary monthly Literatura na Świecie and published literary criticism articles in Tygodnik Powszechny and Gazeta Wyborcza as well as collaborated with such British literary magazines as Poetry Review and Areté. He has taught English literature at the University of Łódź and the University of Warsaw. He also lectured at such institutions as the University of Oxford, Cambridge, Sheffield, York, Belfast, Dublin, Charles University in Prague, Magdeburg and Harvard.

In 2011, he became a member of the Council of the National Culture Center (Polish: Narodowe Centrum Kultury). He is a former member of the Polish Academy of Sciences (PAN) and served as a jury member of the Gdynia Literary Prize. He is also a member of the Association of Translators of Literature and Collegium Invisibile. His main areas of interest include contemporary English and Irish poetry, literary translation, and the history of the Counterculture of the 1960s. He translated the works of such English-language writers as James Joyce, Philip Roth, John Banville, Ursula Le Guin and Craig Raine.

In 2006, he was awarded the Gold Cross of Merit and Bronze Medal for Merit to Culture – Gloria Artis. In 2008, he received a nomination to the Nike Award for his work Znaki firmowe. In 2018, he won the Silesius Poetry Award in the Book of the Year category for Puste noce (Empty Nights). In 2022, he received the most prestigious Polish literary distinction, the Nike Award, for his collection of poetry entitled Mondo Cane. The same year, he was also nominated to the Wisława Szymborska Award.

== Publications ==
=== Poetry ===
- Korytarze (1984)
- Rzeczy oczywistość (1992)
- Rozmowa będzie możliwa (1993)
- Są rzeczy których nie ma (1995)
- Niepoznaki, published by Biuro Literackie Port Legnica (2000)
- Po śladach (2000)
- Dowód z tożsamości, published by Biuro Literackie Port Legnica (2003)
- Oranżada, published by Biuro Lirerackie, Wrocław, (2005) (ISBN 83-88515-82-9)
- Skądinąd. 1977–2007 (2007)
- Makijaż (2009)
- Wybór wiersza (2012)
- Na dzień dzisiejszy i chwilę obecną (2012)
- Woda na Marsie (2015)
- Puste noce (2017)
- Sankcje. Wybór wierszy i wypowiedzi (2018)
- Confiscarea instrumentelor (2019)
- Mondo cane (2021)

=== Literary criticism ===
- The Uses of the Commonplace in Contemporary British Poetry (1994)
- Lista obecności. Szkice o dwudziestowiecznej prozie brytyjskiej i irlandzkiej (2000)
- W brzuchu wieloryba. Szkice o dwudziestowiecznej poezji brytyjskiej i irlandzkiej (2001)
- The Bottomless Centre. The Uses of History in the Poetry of Seamus Heaney (2002)
- Larkin. Odsłuchiwanie wierszy (2006)
- Znaki firmowe. Szkice o współczesnej prozie amerykańskiej i kanadyjskiej (2007)
- Od pieśni do skowytu. Szkice o poetach amerykańskich (2008)
- Heaney. Wiersze pod dotyk (2011)
- Gościnność słowa. Szkice o przekładzie literackim (2012)
- Ekphrasis in the Poetry of Derek Mahon (2013)
- In the Shadow of Foreign Tongues. Essays on Irish Poets (2014)
- Podsłuchy i podglądy (2015)
- All You Need Is Love. Sceny z życia kontrkultury (2016)
- Tłumacz między innymi. Szkice o przekładach, językach i literaturze (2018)
- Bunt wizjonerów (2019)
- Sizif pobednik. Ogledi o knijzevnom prevodu (2021)

== See also ==
- Polish Literature
- Angelus Award
- List of Polish poets
