= Edward Hartwig =

Polish photographer

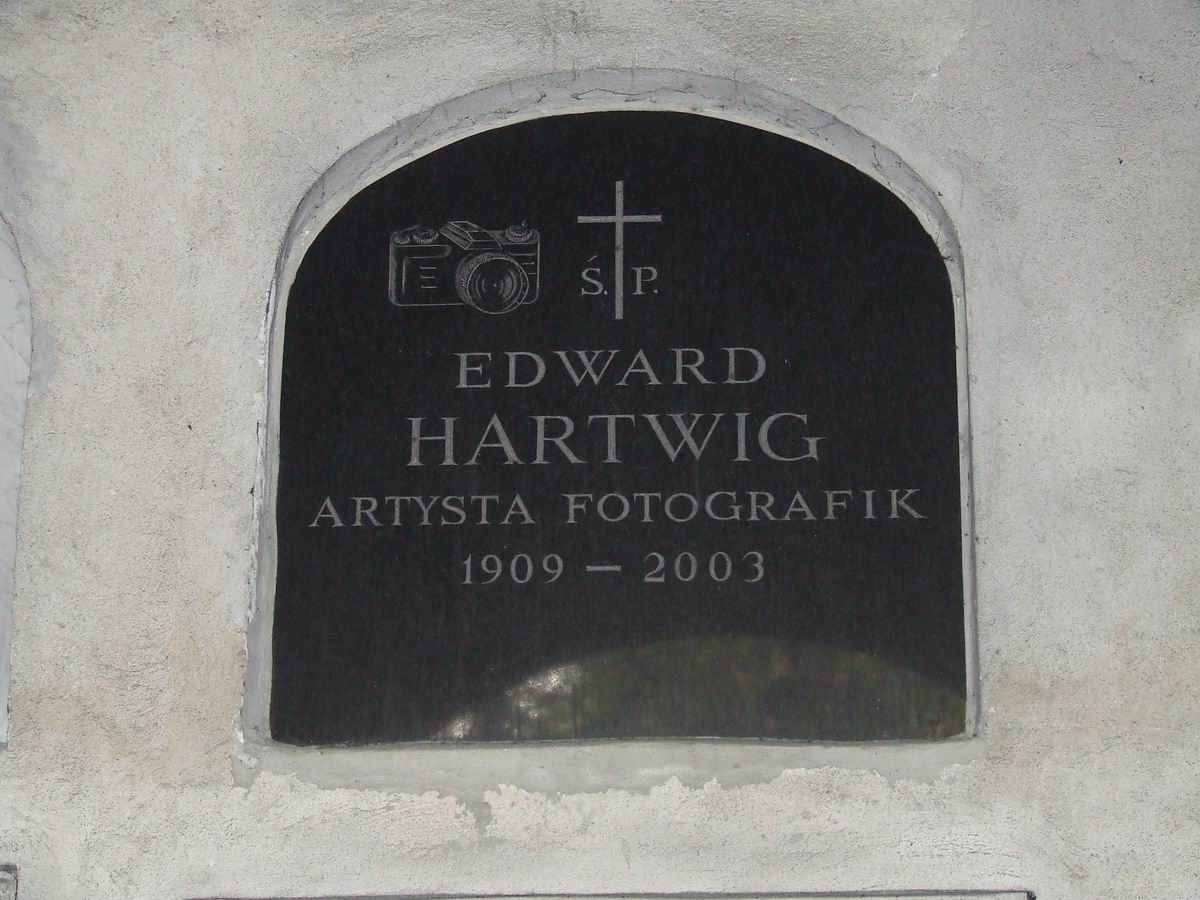
Grave stone in Powązki Cemetery,

Edward Hartwig (6 September 1909, Moscow– 28 October 2003, Warsaw) was a Polish photographer. Born on 6 September 1909 in Moscow and died on 28 October 2003 in Warsaw.

He was the son of Ludwik Hartwig, already an established photographer in Moscow. After Poland became independent in 1918 his family moved to Lublin where his sister, the prominent poet Julia Hartwig was born.

His style was formed under the influence of the work of Jan Bułhak.

In 1954, on the 10th anniversary of People's Poland, he was awarded the Golden Cross of Merit. In 1999, awarded the Commander's Cross with Star of the Order of Rebirth of Poland by Polish President Aleksander Kwasniewski. He is buried in the catacombs of the Powązki Cemetery in Warsaw (row 100–3).
