= Magdalena Tulli =

Polish writer and translator

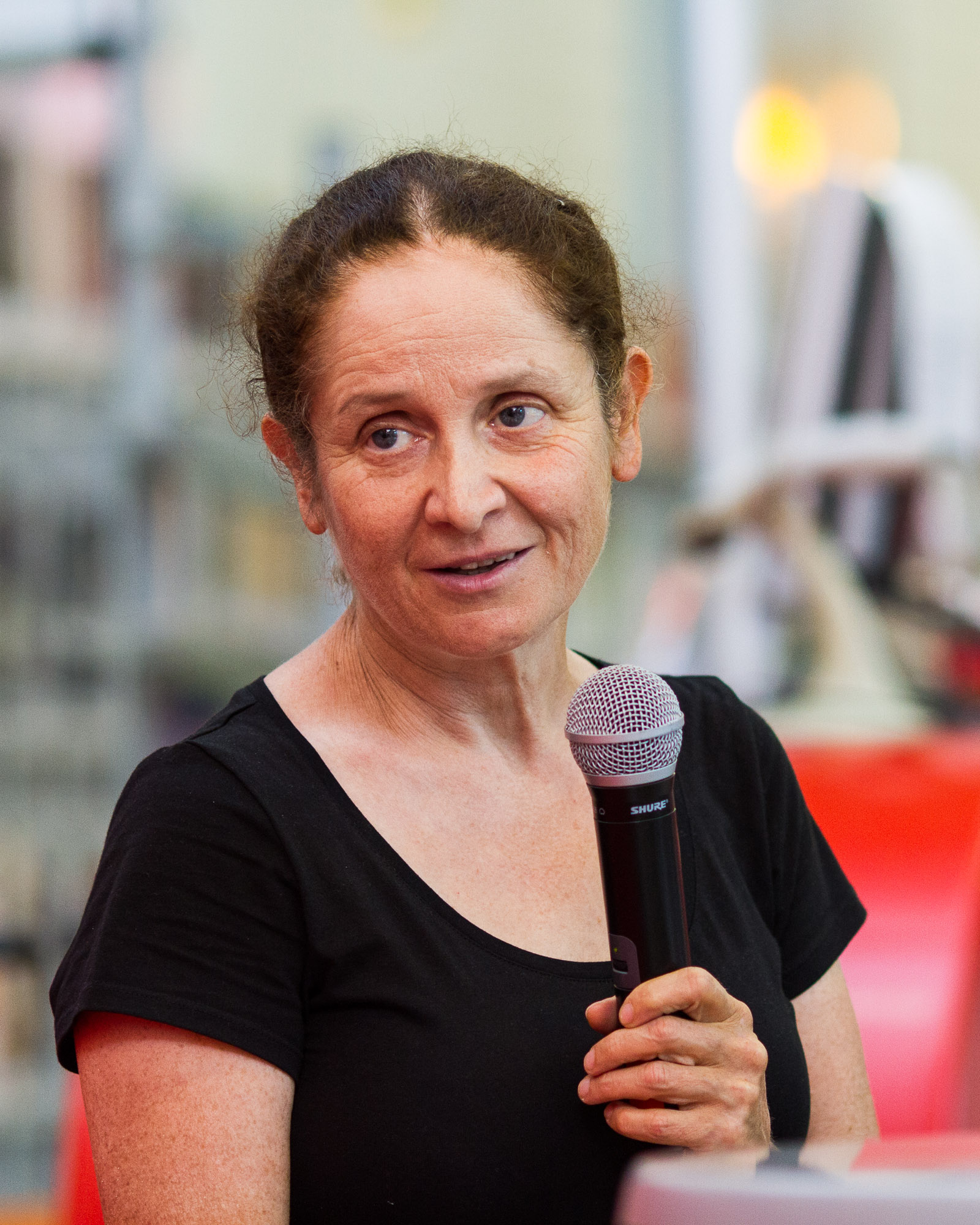
- Tulli in 2015
- Born: Maddalena Flavia Tulli; 20 October 1955 (age 70); Warsaw, Poland
- Education: University of Warsaw
- Occupations: writer, translator
- Works: Sny i kamienie (1995); Kontroler snów (2007); Szum (2014)

Magdalena Tulli (born Maddalena Flavia Tulli; 20 October 1955 in Warsaw, Poland) is a Polish novelist and translator.

== Life and career ==
Tulli has an Italian father and a Polish-Jewish mother, and grew up partially in Italy. She graduated from high school in 1974 in Warsaw and obtained a Master's degree in biology at the University of Warsaw in 1979. She then worked six months at the Henryk Arctowski Polish Antarctic Station. In 1983, she earned a PhD at the Institute of Biology and Zoology of the Polish Academy of Sciences.

Tulli made her literary debut in 1995 with the prose poem Sny i kamienie. She is a member of the Polish Writers' Association. Her works have been translated into many languages. In 2012, she won the Gdynia Literary Prize for her book Włoskie szpilki ("Italian High Heels"). In the same year, her novel In Red, translated by Bill Johnston, was shortlisted for the Best Translated Book Award. She received five nominations for the Nike Award - Poland's most prominent literary prize. Her style has been characterized as postmodern and metafictional.

She translated a number of books including Marcel Proust's La Fugitive, Italo Calvino's The Watcher and Fleur Jaeggy's La paura del cielo.

== Reception ==
In Red has been reviewed by Kirsten Lodge for the Slavic and East European Journal.

== Works ==
- Sny i kamienie 1995. (Dreams and Stones, Archipelago Books 2004).
- W czerwieni 1998. (In red, Archipelago Books 2011).
- Tryby 2003. (Moving Parts, Archipelago Books 2005).
- Skaza 2006. (Flaw, Archipelago Books 2007)
- Kontroler snów 2007, (Wydawnictwo Nisza)
- Włoskie szpilki 2011, (Wydawnictwo Nisza)
- Szum, 2014 (Wydawnictwo Znak)
- Ten i tamten las, 2017 (Wydawnictwo Wilk i Król)
- Jaka piękna iluzja. W rozmowie z Justyną Dąbrowską, 2017 (Wydawnictwo "Znak")

== See also ==
- Polish literature
- List of Polish writers
- Nike Award
