= Bacacay (short story collection) =

1933 short story collection by Witold Gombrowicz

- 1957 Polish edition
- Author: Witold Gombrowicz
- Original title: Pamiętnik z okresu dojrzewania Bakakaj
- Translator: Bill Johnston
- Language: Polish
- Publication date: 1933
- Publication place: Poland
- English publication date: 2004

Bacacay (Polish: Bakakaj) is a short story collection by the Polish writer Witold Gombrowicz. The stories were originally published in 1933, in an edition called Pamiętnik z okresu dojrzewania ("Memoirs from puberty" or lit. "Memoirs from the time of immaturity"), which was Gombrowicz's literary debut. In 1957 it was re-released as Bakakaj, and included five additional stories.

== Contents ==
"Lawyer Kraykowski's Dancer" (1926, "Tancerz mecenasa Kraykowskiego")

"The Memoirs of Stefan Czarniecki" (1926, "Pamiętnik Stefana Czarnieckiego")

"A Premeditated Crime" (1928, "Zbrodnia z premedytacją")

"Dinner at Countess Pavahoke's" (1928, "Biesiada u hrabiny Kotłubaj")

"Virginity" (1928, "Dziewictwo")

"Adventures" (1930, "Przygody")

"The Events on the Banbury" (1932, "Zdarzenia na brygu Banbury")

Bakakaj edition only:

"Philidor's Child Within" (1935, "Filidor podszyty dzieckiem")

"Philibert's Child Within" (1935, "Filibert podszyty dzieckiem")

"On the Kitchen Steps" (1929, "Na kuchennych schodach")

"The Rat" (1937, "Szczur")

"The Banquet" (1946, "Bankiet")

== Writing process ==
The stories in the first edition were written from 1926 to 1932, and the second from 1935 to 1946. One exception was "On the Kitchen Steps", which was written in 1929, but omitted from the first edition to avoid the interpretation that it was about the writer's father. "Philidor's Child Within" and "Philibert's Child Within" were also featured in the novel Ferdydurke.

== Publication ==
The book was first published in Poland in 1933. Upon the 1957 re-release, Gombrowicz decided to change the original title since it had led to misinterpretations. He chose Bakakaj as the new title because it was the name of the street (Bacacay) where he lived during his stay in Buenos Aires, Argentina. An English translation by Bill Johnston was published in 2004 in the United States through Archipelago Books.

== Critical response ==
Louis Begley reviewed the book in The Washington Post upon the American release in 2004, and called the stories "all highly accomplished". Begley described Gombrowicz as an aesthete with an element of moralism, comparing "Dinner at Countess Pavahoke's" to Jonathan Swift's A Modest Proposal, but wrote that "the effervescent and amusing stories in Bacacay should be read in the spirit of fun and not in search for an aesthetic system or clues to his psyche".
