= Julia Fiedorczuk =

Polish poet and prose writer

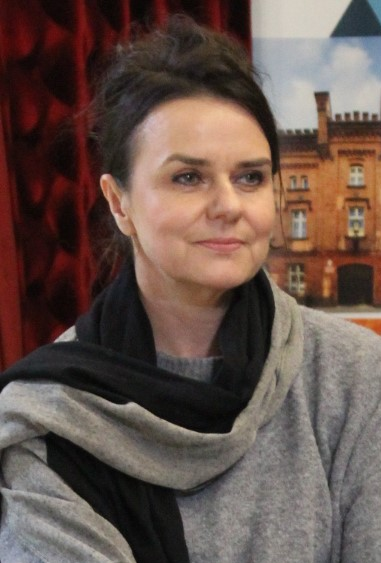
- Fiedorczuk in 2024
- Born: 23 February 1975 (age 51); Warsaw, Poland
- Education: University of Warsaw
- Occupations: poet, writer, translator, literary scholar

Julia Aleksandra Fiedorczuk-Glinecka (born 23 February 1975) is a Polish poet, prose writer, translator, literary critic and literary scholar. She is professor at the University of Warsaw.

== Books ==
=== Poetry ===
- Listopad nad Narwią (Legnica 2000)
- Bio (Wrocław 2004)
- Planeta rzeczy zagubionych (Wrocław 2006)
- Tlen (Wrocław 2009)
- tuż-tuż (Wrocław 2012)
- Psalmy (Wrocław 2017), Wisława Szymborska Award 2018, Silesius Poetry Award (nominated) 2018
- Astrostrada z girlandami. Wiersze zebrane (Wrocław 2023, ISBN 978-83-67186-03-2)
- Glif (Wrocław 2024, ISBN 978-83-67186-84-1)

=== Prose ===
- Poranek Marii i inne opowiadania (Wrocław 2010)
- Biała Ofelia (Wrocław 2011)
- Nieważkość (Wrocław 2015), Nike Award (nominated) 2016
- Bliskie kraje (Wrocław 2016)
- Każdy śnił swój sen (Warszawa 2019)
- Pod słońcem (Kraków 2020)
- Dom Oriona (Kraków 2023, ISBN 978-83-08-08141-9)

=== Essay ===
- Złożoność nie jest zbrodnią. Szkice o amerykańskiej poezji modernistycznej i postmodernistycznej (Warszawa 2015)
- Ekopoetyka (together Gerardo Beltrán, Warszawa 2015)
- Cyborg w ogrodzie (Gdańsk 2015)
- Inne możliwości (Gdańsk 2019)

=== Translations ===
- Laura Riding Jackson, Korona dla Hansa Andersena (Wrocław 2012)
- Laura Riding Jackson, Obroty cudów (Wrocław 2012)
- Laurie Anderson, Język przyszłości (Wrocław 2012)
- Forrest Gander, Bądź blisko (Kraków 2020)
- Forrest Gander, Podwojone życie. Ekologia bliskości (Wrocław 2023, ISBN 978-83-66257-52-8)

== Awards ==
- nomination for Nike Award 2016
- Wisława Szymborska Award 2018
- nomination for Silesius Poetry Award 2018
