= Wiesław Myśliwski =

Polish writer (1932–2026)

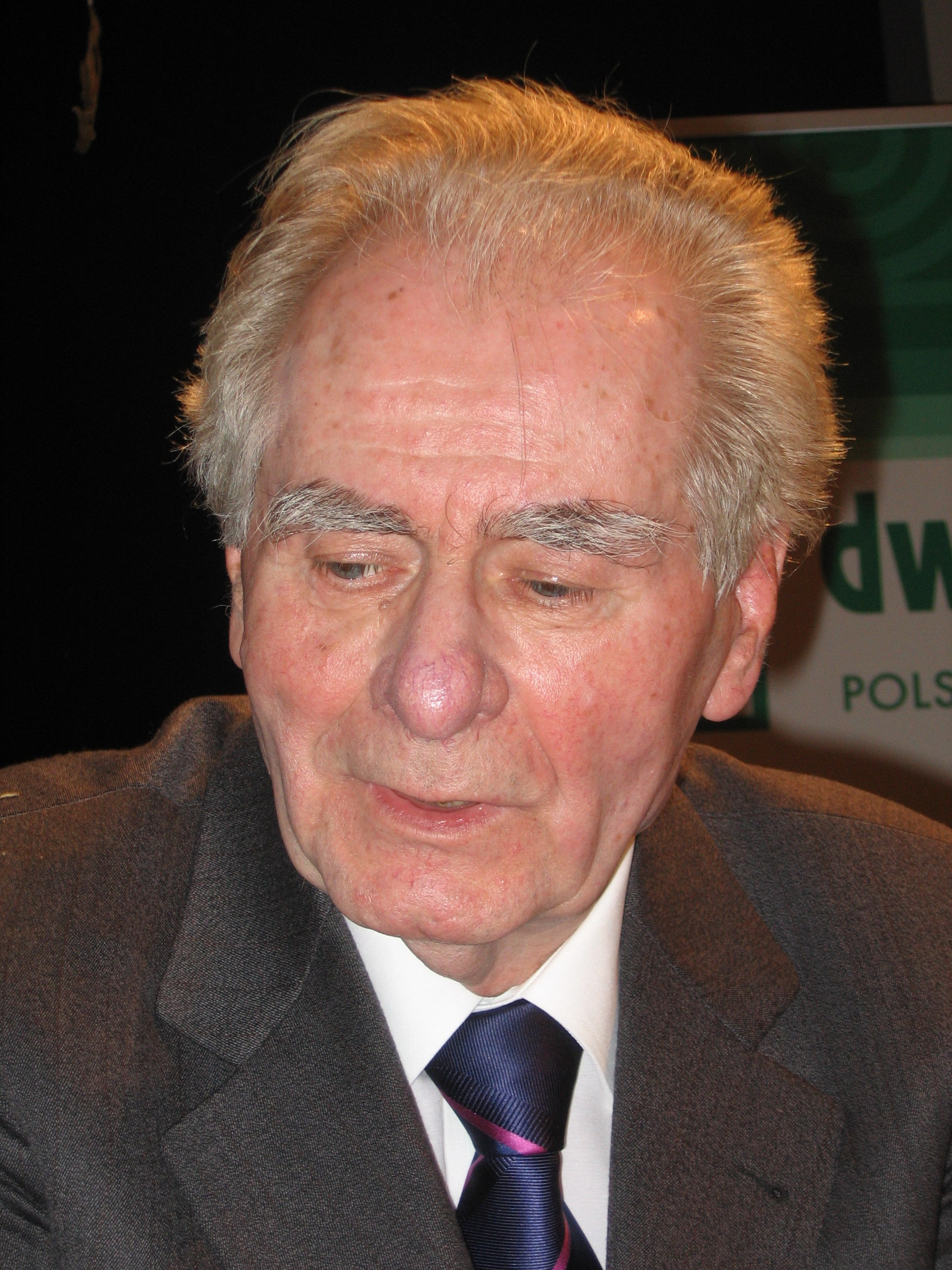
- Myśliwski in 2006
- Born: 25 March 1932; Dwikozy, Poland
- Died: 29 March 2026 (aged 94); Warsaw, Poland
- Education: Catholic University of Lublin (KUL)
- Occupations: Novelist; playwright
- Known for: Traktat o łuskaniu fasoli (2006); Widnokrąg (1996); Kamień na kamieniu (1984)
- Awards: Nike Award (2007); Nike Award (1998)

Wiesław Myśliwski (Polish pronunciation: [ˈvjɛswaf mɨˈɕlifskʲi]; 25 March 1932 – 29 March 2026) was a Polish novelist. He was a two-time recipient of the Nike Award, the most important literary prize for Polish literature.

== Life and career ==
Myśliwski was born to a middle class family in Dwikozy, near Sandomierz and raised in Ćmielów, where his father had participated in the Polish-Soviet War and became a local official after being demobilized. In her youth, his mother was an active member of ZMW, a rural young person's organization founded by Ignacy Solarz.

After the war, he attended secondary schools in Sandomierz; graduating in 1951. He then studied philology at the Catholic University of Lublin, taking his degree in 1956. From then until 1976, he worked on the editorial staff at the Ludowa Spółdzielnia Wydawnicza (People's Publishing Cooperative).

From 1976 to 1999, he was Editor-in-chief of the cultural quarterly Regiony, and later contributed to the literary bi-weekly Sycyna. From 1997, he chaired the jury for the Aleksander Patkowski prize. He was a member of the Polish Writers' Union from 1971 to 1983.

Myśliwski died on 29 March 2026, at the age of 94.

== Works ==
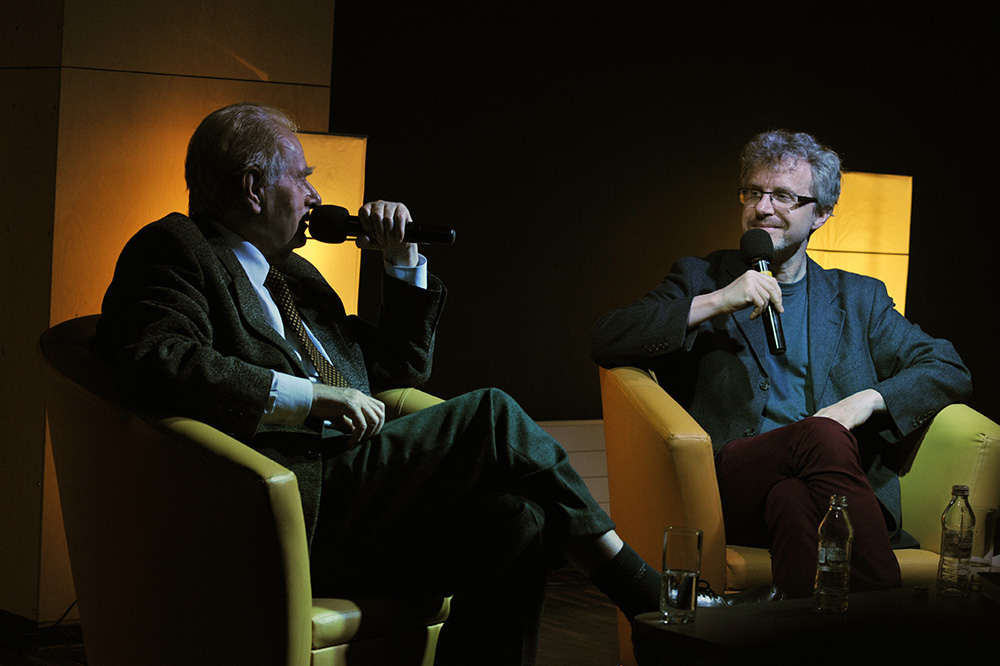
Polish writer Wiesław Myśliwski (left) during a public talk conducted by Jakub Ekier (right) with live audience in Warsaw on 20 April 2015

In his novels and plays Myśliwski concentrated on life in the Polish countryside. He was a two-time winner of the Nike Award (Polish equivalent of the Booker Prize) for Horizon (1996) and A Treatise on Shelling Beans (2006). Until Myśliwski's death, only Myśliwski and Olga Tokarczuk have won the award twice.

His first novel translated into English was The Palace, rendered by Ursula Phillips. Bill Johnston's English translation of Kamień na kamieniu, published by Archipelago Books as Stone Upon Stone, won the 2012 Best Translated Book Award.

=== Novels ===
- 1967: Nagi sad, Warsaw, Publisher: PIW
- 1970: Pałac (translated by Ursula Phillips as The Palace in 1991), Warsaw, Publisher:PIW
- 1984: Kamień na kamieniu (translated by Bill Johnston as Stone Upon Stone in 2011), Warsaw, Publisher:PIW
- 1996: Widnokrąg, Warsaw, Publisher: Muza
- 2006: Traktat o łuskaniu fasoli (translated by Bill Johnston as A Treatise on Shelling Beans in 2013), Kraków, Publisher: Znak
- 2013: Ostatnie rozdanie, Kraków, Publisher: Znak
- 2018: Ucho Igielne, Kraków, Publisher: Znak

=== Dramas ===
- 1973: Złodziej
- 1978: Klucznik
- 1988: Drzewo, Szczecin, Publisher: Wydawnictwo Glob
- 2000: Requiem dla gospodyni, Warsaw, Publisher: Muza

=== Essays and interviews ===
- 2003: Kres kultury chłopskiej Bochnia, Prowincjonalna Oficyna Wydawnicza
- 2021: Myśliwski - Bocheński Rozmowy istotne, Łódź, Wydawnictwo Uniwersytetu Łódzkiego
- 2022: W środku jesteśmy baśnią : mowy i rozmowy, Kraków, Znak

== Selected awards and honors ==
- 1996: Nike Award, Widnokrąg
- 1997: Władysław Reymont Prize, Widnokrąg
- 2005: Golden Medal for Merit to Culture - Gloria Artis
- 2006: Nike Award, Traktat o łuskaniu fasoli
- 2007: Gdynia Literary Prize, Widnokrąg
- 2012: Best Translated Book Award, Stone Upon Stone (Kamień na kamieniu)
- 2012: PEN Translation Prize, Stone Upon Stone
- 2012: Commander's Cross of the Order of Polonia Restituta
- 2012: Honorary doctorate from the University of Rzeszów
- 2022: Honorary doctorate from the Jagiellonian University

== See also ==
- Polish literature
- List of Polish-language writers
