= Silesius Poetry Award =

Polish literary prize

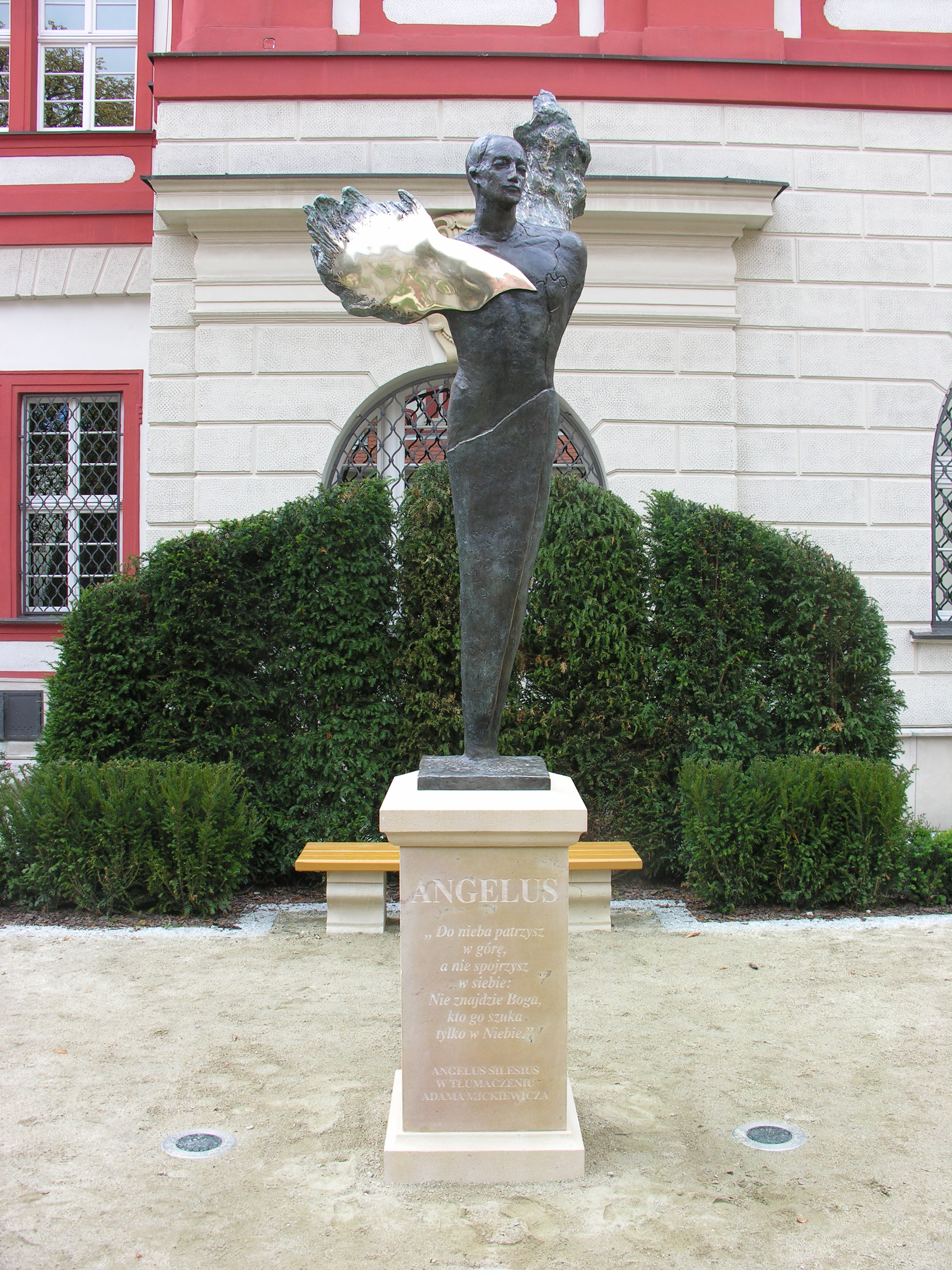
- Angelus Silesius Monument in Wrocław
- Awarded for: literary achievements in poetry
- Country: Poland
- Presented by: the city of Wrocław
- First award: 2008

The Silesius Poetry Award (Polish: Wrocławska Nagroda Poetycka Silesius) is an annual Polish literary prize presented by the city of Wrocław, Lower Silesia.

== History ==
The award was established in 2008 and is presented during the Port Literacki Wrocław Festival. It takes its name from a prominent Silesian Baroque poet Angelus Silesius (1624–1677). The award was created on the initiative of Jarosław Broda, head of the Wroclaw Department of Culture, and is funded by the city of Wrocław. It is awarded in three major categories: lifetime achievement, best debut and book of the year and the laureates receive cash prizes of PLN 100,000 (c. $25,000), PLN 50,000 and PLN 20,000 respectively. They are also presented with a statuette designed by a Polish sculptor Michał Staszczak.

== Laureates ==
2008

- Book of the Year: Andrzej Sosnowski (for Po tęczy) (After the Rainbow)
- Best Debut: Julia Szychowiak (for Po sobie)
- Lifetime Achievement Award: Tadeusz Różewicz

2009

- Book of the Year: Krystyna Miłobędzka (for Gubione)
- Best Debut: Dariusz Basiński (for Motor kupił Duszan)
- Lifetime Achievement Award: Stanisław Barańczak

2010

- Book of the Year: Piotr Matywiecki (for Powietrze i czerń) (Air and Blackness)
- Best Debut: Jakobe Mansztajn (for Wiedeński high life) (The Vienna High Life)
- Lifetime Achievement Award: Piotr Sommer

2011

- Book of the Year: Bohdan Zadura (for Nocne życie) (Night Life)
- Best Debut: Kira Pietrek (for Język korzyści)
- Lifetime Achievement Award: Urszula Kozioł

2012

- Book of the Year: Eugeniusz Tkaczyszyn-Dycki (for Imię i znamię) (The Name and the Mark)
- Best Debut: Tomasz Bąk (for Kanada) ("Canada")
- Lifetime Achievement Award: Marcin Świetlicki

2013

- Book of the Year: Marcin Baran (for Niemal całkowita utrata płynności) (A Near Total Loss of Fluency)
- Best Debut: Ilona Witkowska (for Splendida realta)
- Lifetime Achievement Award: Krystyna Miłobędzka

2014

- Book of the Year: Mariusz Grzebalski (for W innych okolicznościach) (In Other Circumstances)
- Best Debut: Martyna Buliżańska (for Moja jest ta ziemia) (This Land is Mine)
- Lifetime Achievement Award: Darek Foks

2015

- Book of the Year: Marcin Sendecki (for Przedmiar robót)
- Best Debut: Michał Książek (for Nauka o ptakach)
- Lifetime Achievement Award: Jacek Podsiadło

2016

- Book of the Year: Barbara Klicka (for Nice)
- Best Debut: Aldona Kopkiewicz (for Sierpień) (August)
- Lifetime Achievement Award: Julian Kornhauser

2017

- Book of the Year: Jacek Podsiadło (for Włos Bregueta) (Breguet's Hair)
- Best Debut: Radosław Jurczak (for Pamięć zewnętrzna)
- Lifetime Achievement Award: Andrzej Sosnowski

2018

- Book of the Year: Jerzy Jarniewicz (for Puste noce) (Empty Nights)
- Best Debut: Agata Jabłońska (for Raport wojenny) (The War Report)
- Lifetime Achievement Award: Bohdan Zadura

2019

- Book of the Year: Adam Kaczanowski (for Cele)
- Best Debut: Maciej Bobula (for Wsie, animalia, miscellanea)
- Lifetime Achievement Award: Ewa Lipska

2020

- Book of the Year: Konrad Góra (for Kalendarz Majów) (The Maya Calendar)
- Best Debut: Jakub Pszoniak (for Chyba na pewno)
- Lifetime achievement Award: Eugeniusz Tkaczyszyn-Dycki

2021

- Book of the Year: Kamila Janiak (for Zakaz rozmów z osobami nieobecnymi fizycznie)
- Best Debut: Aleksander Trojanowski (for Parkingi podziemne jako miasta spotkań)
- Lifetime Achievement Award: Ryszard Krynicki

2022

- Book of the Year: Krzysztof Siwczyk (for Krematoria I. Krematoria II)
- Best Debut: Marta Stachniałek (for Polski wrap)
- Lifetime Achievement Award: Marcin Sendecki

== See also ==
- Nike Award
- Angelus Award
- Polish literature
