= Konrad Góra =

Poet, editor and activist (born 1978)

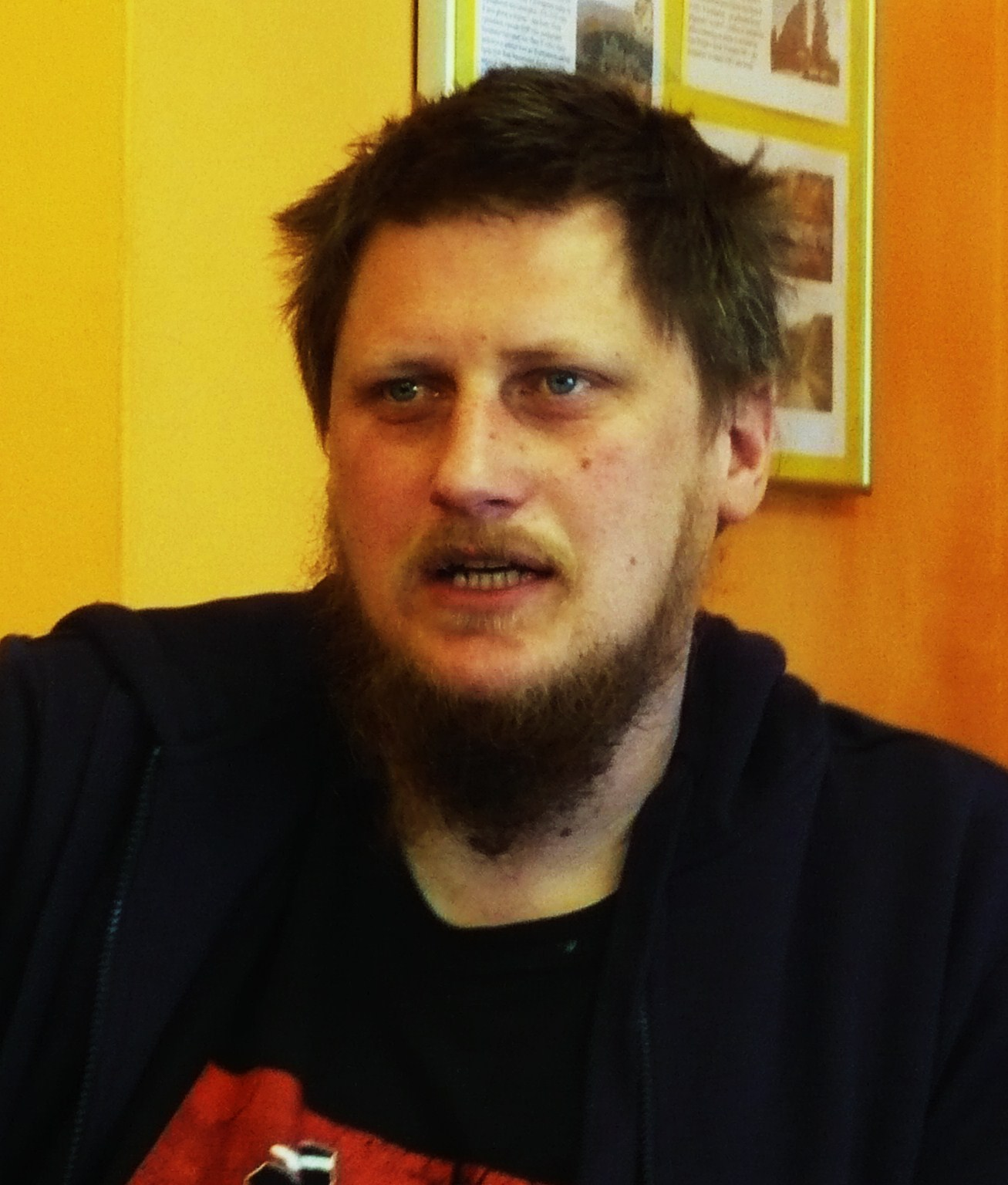
- Konrad Góra, 2015
- Born: 1978 (age 47–48); Oleśnica
- Occupations: Poet, editor, activist

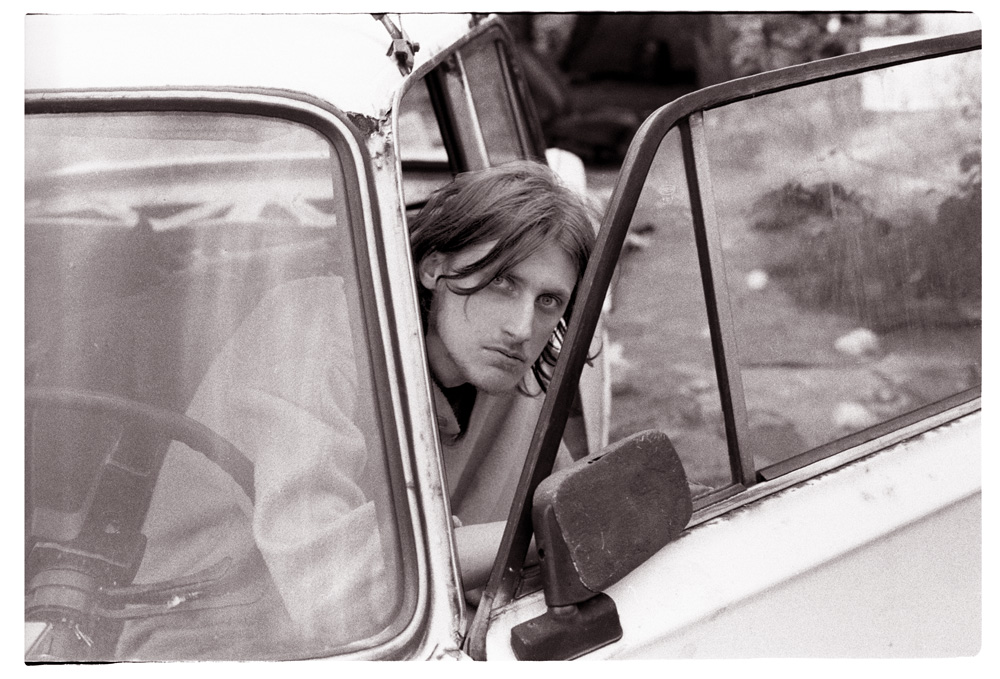
Konrad Góra, 2003

Konrad Góra (born 1978) is a poet, editor and activist.

== Biography ==
He lived in Oleśnica and in Wrocław. He is an activist of the Wrocław branch of the Food Not Bombs campaign.

== Works ==
=== Poetry books ===
- Requiem dla Saddama Husajna i inne wiersze dla ubogich duchem. Wrocław: Biblioteka Rity Baum. 2008.
- Pokój widzeń (PDF). Poznań: Wojewódzka Biblioteka Publiczna i Centrum Animacji Kultury w Poznaniu. 2011. Archived from the original (PDF) on 12 June 2026.
- Siła niższa (full hasiok). Wrocław: Fundacja na Rzecz Kultury i Edukacji im. Tymoteusza Karpowicza. 2012.
- Nie. Stronie Śląskie: Biuro Literackie. 2016.
- Kalendarz majów. Stronie Śląskie: Biuro Literackie. 2019.
- Dzień został w nocy. Wiersze miłości i z nienawiści. Ligota Mała-Wrocław-Dùn Èideann: wydawnictwo papierwdole, Katalog Press. 2021.
- W Chinach żeby ogłosić wiersz. Drugie echo wściekłych lat: wiersze, próby i tytuły utracone prozą, eksperymentem i zaniechaniem 2021–2024. Ligota Mała: Wydawnictwo papierwdole. 2025.

=== Editions ===
- Świrszczyńska, Anna (2013). Kona ostatni człowiek. Wrocław: Biuro Literackie. Selection of poems and afterword by Konrad Góra.

== Accolades ==
- Silesius Poetry Award, Book of the Year for Kalendarz majów (2020)
- Silesius Poetry Award, Lifetime Achievement Award (2026)
