= Julia Hartwig =

Polish writer, poet and translator

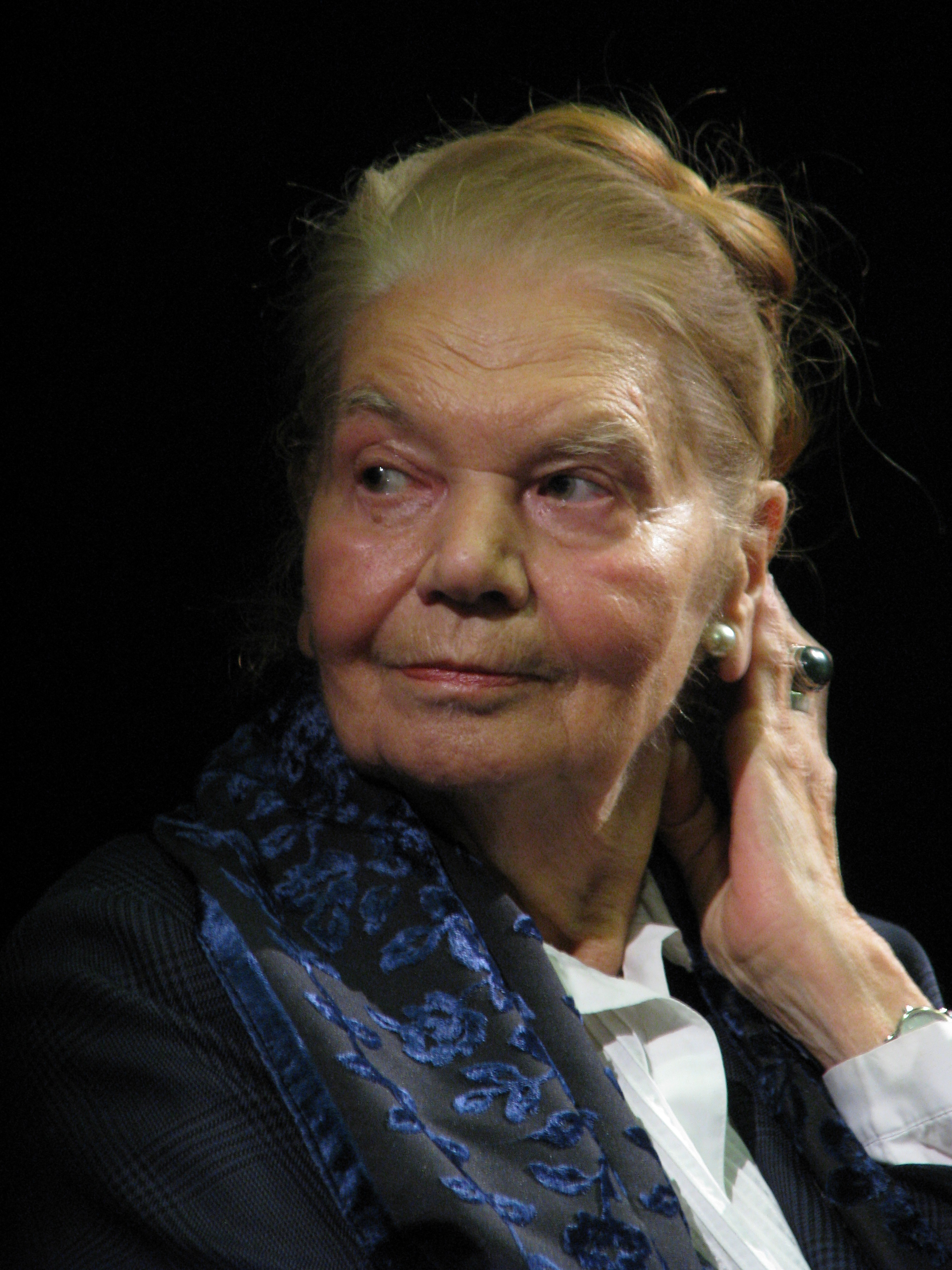
- Hartwig in 2009
- Born: 14 August 1921; Lublin, Poland
- Died: 14 July 2017 (aged 95); Gouldsboro, Pennsylvania
- Occupations: Poet, translator

Julia Hartwig-Międzyrzecka (14 August 1921 – 14 July 2017) was a Polish writer, poet and translator, considered to be one of Poland's most important poets.

== Life and career ==
She was born and raised in Lublin. She studied Polish and French literature at Warsaw University and continued her studies at the Catholic University of Lublin. Her first poems appeared in the journal Odrodzenie in 1944. Hartwig lived in Paris from 1947-50. In 1954, she published Z niedalekich podróży (From Nearby Places), a collection of articles. She published her first collection of poetry Pożegnania (Farewells) in 1956.

She lived in the United States from 1970 to 1974, later returning to Warsaw. During her time in America, Hartwig took part in the International Writing Program at the University of Iowa and also taught at several universities.

She published translations of French poetry by Guillaume Apollinaire, Blaise Cendrars, Max Jacob, Henri Michaux, and Pierre Reverdy and wrote books on Apollinaire and Gérard de Nerval. She also published translations of American poets such as Robert Bly and Marianne Moore. Hartwig's poetry has been translated into English, French, Italian, Russian, Lithuanian, Serbian, Greek and German.

External videos
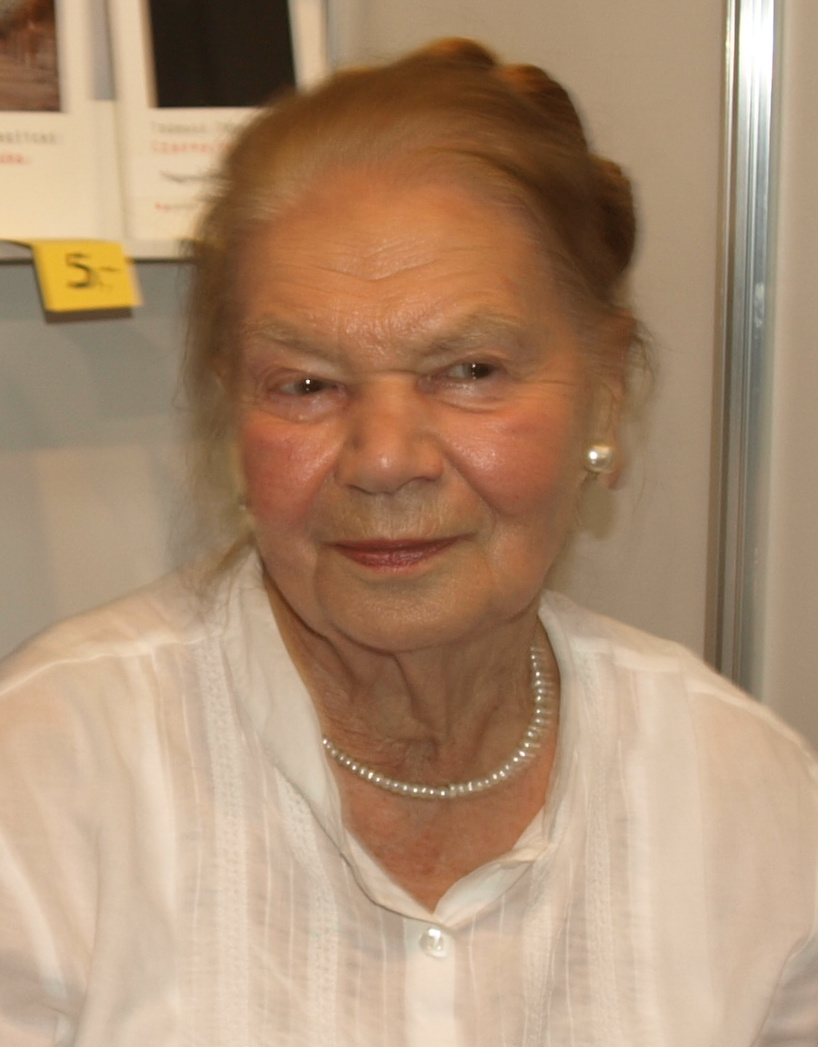
- Born at the meeting point of diagonals, Julia Hartwig, poet, Web of Stories

Hartwig was awarded the Jurzykowski Prize, the Thornton Wilder Prize from Columbia University's Translation Center and the Georg Trakl Poetry Prize. She received six nominations for the prestigious Nike Award. She is the winner of the 2014 Wisława Szymborska Award for her book of poetry Zapisane.

== Personal life ==
She was married to Zygmunt Kałużyński. In 1954, Hartwig married the poet and activist Artur Międzyrzecki. They had one daughter, Daniela, with whom they left for the US in 1971. Artur Międzyrzecki died in 1996 in Warsaw. Julia Hartwig died on 14 July 2017 in Pennsylvania at the age of 95.

Her father was Ludwig Hartwig, and her brothers were Edward Hartwig and Walenty Hartwig.

== Selected works ==
Sources.

- Wolne ręce (Free hands), poetry (1969)
- Wielki pościg (The big race), children's book (1969)
- Dwoistość (Duality), poetry (1971)
- Czuwanie (Vigilance), poetry (1978)
- Chwila postoju (A moment of rest), poetry (1980)
- Obcowanie (Communion), poetry (1987)
- Czułość (Tenderness), poetry (1992)
- Bez pozegnania (No Farewells) (2004), nominated for a Nike Award
