= Tomasz Różycki =

Polish poet and translator

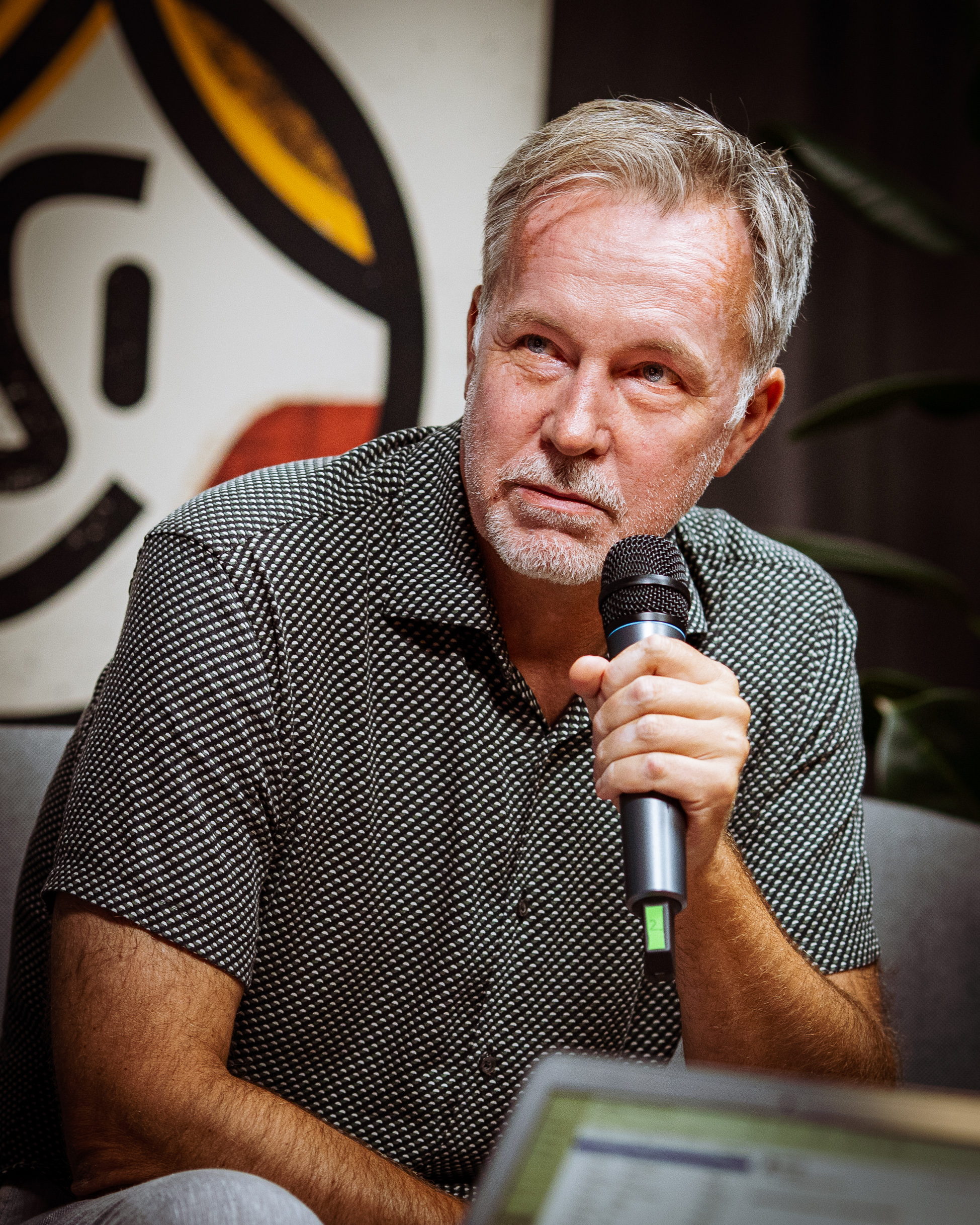
- Born: 29 May 1970 (age 56)
- Education: Jagiellonian University
- Occupations: professor, writer and translator
- Writing career
- Genre: poetry
- Notable work: "Twelve Stations"
- Notable awards: Kościelski Award; Wisława Szymborska Award

Tomasz Różycki (born 1970) is a Polish poet and translator. He studied Romance Languages at the Jagiellonian University in Kraków, and taught French at the Foreign Languages Teaching College in Opole. In addition to his teaching, he translated and published Stéphane Mallarmé's "Un coup de dés jamais n'abolira le hasard" in 2005, and continues to translate from French for publication.

He has published six books of poetry: Vaterland (1997), Anima (1999), Chata uimaita (Country Cottage, 2001), Świat i Antyświat (World and Antiworld, 2003), the book-length poem Dwanaście stacji (Twelve Stations, 2004), Kolonie (Colonies, 2006) and The Forgotten Keys (2007). His work has appeared in literary journals such as Czas Kultury, Odra, Studium and PEN America, and in German, Bulgarian, Lithuanian, Ukrainian and German poetry anthologies.

== Awards and recognition ==
Tomasz Różycki gained critical acclaim for "Twelve Stations." In 2004, the book-length poem won the prestigious Kościelski Foundation Prize and was named best Book of the Spring 2004 by the Raczyński Library in Poznań. He has received the Krzysztof Kamiel Baczyński Prize (1997), the Czas Kultury Prize (1997), The Rainer Maria Rilke Award (1998), and the Joseph Brodskie Prize from Zeszyty Literackie (2006). He has been nominated twice for the NIKE Prize (2005 and 2007), and once for the Paszport Polityki (2004), Poland's top literary award.

"Colonies," Mira Rosenthal's 2013 translation into English of Kolonie (published by Zephyr Press), was shortlisted for the 2014 Griffin Poetry Prize and the 2014 Oxford-Weidenfeld Translation Prize (UK), and won the 2014 Northern California Book Award for Poetry in Translation. It was long-listed for the 2014 PEN Poetry in Translation Award. Rosenthal's 2024 translation of To the Letter received the AATSEEL prize for Best Translation of Poetry into English.

In 2023, he received the Grand Continent Prize for his book The Bulb Thieves, which, according to Giuliano da Empoli, member of the Prize Jury, "doesn't actually tell much: the day of a boy in a bar of buildings in communist Warsaw, sent by his parents, who collected a bag of coffee beans, to find a grinding machine. This story, which is not one, brings out a whole world. It’s wacky, very moving, it immerses us in this world. And we rewarded him for the somewhat selfish pleasure of being able to read it in full”.

During his speech accepting the Prize, Tomasz Różycki declared

Today, I received questions from readers who asked me if this building was in such and such a place, because they thought they recognized their own windows there, their own lives. It is not only the fate of the Poles that I am recounting, it is the fate of all of post-Soviet Europe, that of millions of people. When I look towards the East, I see once again a people who are fighting for this dignity of man, for freedom, against a Russian despotism - still today -, and who, in doing this, are the most successful people. most European there is. It is a people who die for our values. I am of course thinking of Ukraine, where Słowacki was born

== Bibliography ==
Each year links to its corresponding "[year] in poetry" article:

Original poetry

- 1997: Vaterland, Łódź: Stowarzyszenie Literackie im. K.K. Baczyńskiego
- 1999: Anima, Zielona Sowa, Kraków
- 2001: Chata uimaita ("Country Cottage"), Warsaw: Lampa i Iskra Boża
- 2003: Świat i Antyświat ("World and Antiworld"), Warsaw: Lampa i Iskra Boża
- 2004: Dwanaście stacji ("Twelve Stations"), a book-length poem, awarded the 2004 Kościelski Prize; Kraków: Znak
- 2004: Wiersze, containing all the poems from Różycki's first four poetry books, Warsaw: Lampa i Iskra Boża
- 2006: Kolonie ("Colonies"), 77 poems, 86 pp, Kraków: Znak, ISBN 83-240-0697-4
- 2007: The Forgotten Keys

Translation

- 2005: translator, Rzut kośćmi nigdy nie zniesie przypadku, translated from the original French of Stéphane Mallarmé, Kraków: Korporacja Ha!Art
