= Wacław Waldemar Michalski =

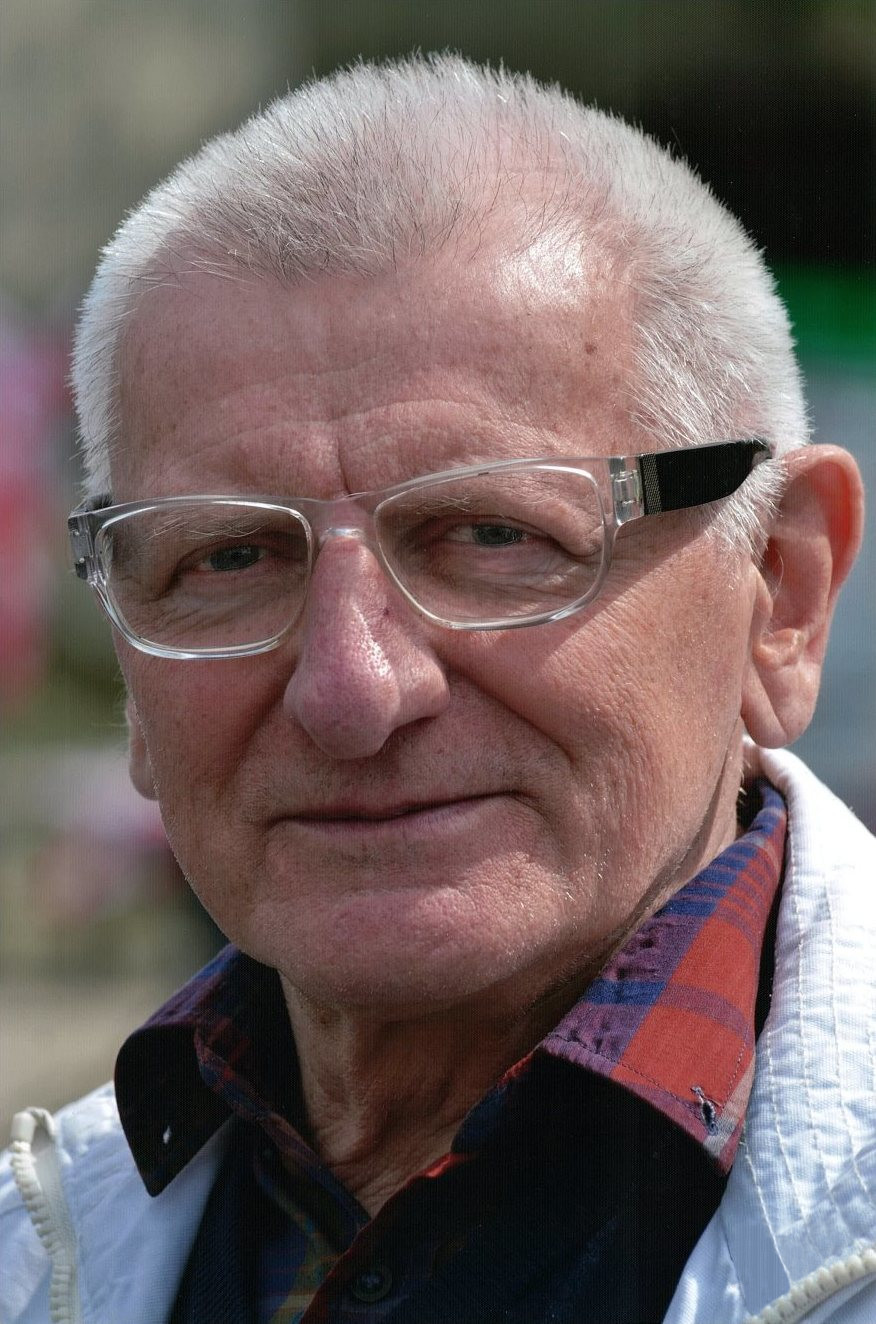
Waldemar Michalski; Photo: Krzysztof Kuzko

Wacław Waldemar Michalski (born 27 September 1938 in Volodymyr-Volynskyi) is a Polish poet, librarian, editor, curator and critic.

== Biography ==
Waldemar Michalski studied Polish Philology at the John Paul II Catholic University of Lublin, which he finished in 1963 with the Magister. At the same time he became a member of the literary group "Prom", later, along with Wacław Oszajca, also the group "Signum". His prose debut was in "Tygodnik Społeczno-Kulturalny Katolików" with a report on Polish people in Lviv ("Polacy ziemi lwowskiej"), as a poet in 1960 in the almanac "Biuletyn Młodego Twórcy" with the poem "Poezja Starego Miasta".

From 1962 to 1985 he was curator of the University Library at the Catholic University of Lublin, from 1977 lecturer for Polish Language and Culture. Since 1978 Michalski Member and in 1986 the board of the Polish Writers' Union. Since 1985 he has been secretary of the literary magazine "Akcent". His texts and reviews published in numerous magazines. In 1995 he was with Bogusław Wróblewski and Bohdan Zadura initiator establishing the East Cultural Foundation "Akcent" and is the secretary.

Waldemar Michalski also published under the pseudonyms WM, Wacław Volynsky Wam, Wami.

== Poetry ==
- Pejzaż rdzawy, Lublin 1973
- Ogród, Lublin 1977
- Głosy na wersety, Lublin 1979
- Pod znakiem wagi, Lublin 1987
- Będziesz jak piołun. Wybór wierszy, Lublin 1991
- Lekcja wspólnego język, wiersze, Lublin 1999
- Tryptyk z gwiazdą. Wiersze i przekłady. Lublin 2006
- Bariera timpului nu exista. Culegere de poezii, Translation into Romanian by Alexandru G. Serban, Jasi 2012
- Z podróży na Wschód, Toronto 2013

== Prizes and awards (selection) ==
- Prizes at "Łódzka Wiosna Poetów" (1969, 1971, 1976, 1977)
- Czechowicz Literature Prize, 1968 und 1974
- Literature Prize "Głos Nauczycielski", 1989
- Main Prize at J.-Łobodowski-Literature competition, 1999
- Zasłużony Działacz Kultury, 1977
- Witold Hulewicz Prize, 2006
- Culture Prize of the Province Lublin, 2007
- Special Prize of the Minister of Culture: „W uznaniu zasług dla Kultury Polskiej”, 2008
- Srebrna Odznaka Zasłużonemu dla Lublina, 1988
- Medal Wschodniej Fundacji Kultury Akcent, 1998
- Cross of Merit/Złoty Krzyż Zasługi, 1990 and 2005
- Medal for Merit to Culture – Gloria Artis/Medal Zasłużony Kulturze Gloria Artis, 2009
- Złoty Wawrzyn Literacki, 2012
- Culture Prize of the City Lublin, 2012
