= Jakub Kornhauser =

Polish poet and literary critic (born 1984)

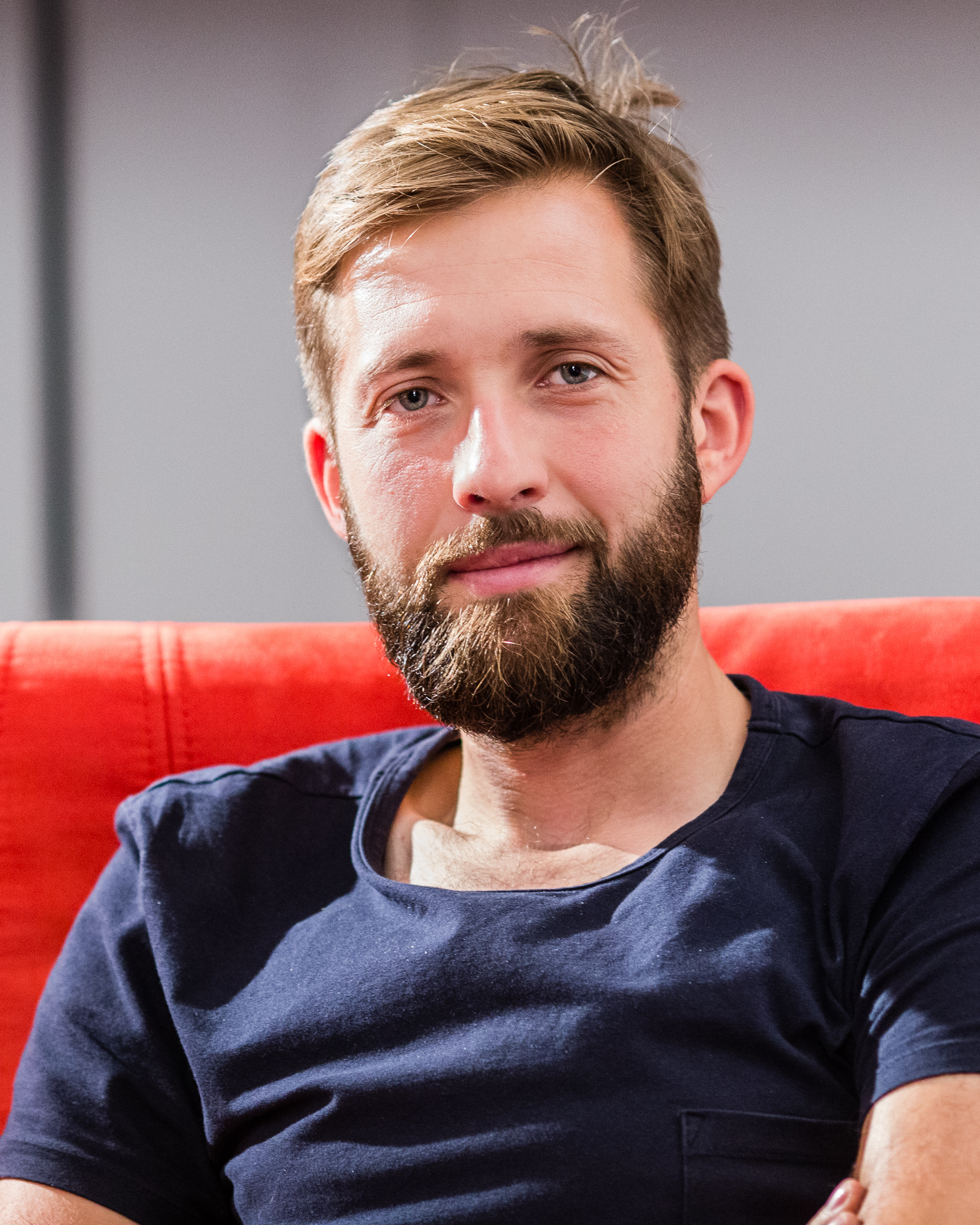
- Jakub Kornhauser, 2019
- Born: 16 January 1984 (age 42); Kraków
- Citizenship: Polish
- Occupations: Poet, writer, literary critic
- Parent: Julian Kornhauser (father)

Jakub Kornhauser (born 16 January 1984) is a poet, translator, essayist, editor, literary critic and literary scholar, academic teacher at the Jagiellonian University.

== Biography ==
The son of Julian Kornhauser, the younger brother of Agata Kornhauser-Duda, the brother-in-law of Andrzej Duda.

In 2008 he graduated with master's degree in Romanian language studies from the Jagiellonian University He obtained doctorate from the Jagiellonian University in 2014. upon dissertation Całkowita rewolucja. Status przedmiotu w poezji europejskiego surrealizmu.

== Poetry books ==
- Niebezpieczny paragraf. 2007.
- Niejasne istnienia. 2009. Poetic prose.
- Drożdżownia. 2015. Poetic prose.
- Dziewięć dni w ścianie. 2019. Poetic prose.
- Krwotoki i wiewiórki. 2021.
- Brzydko tną twoje noże?. 2021.
- In amplexu. 2022.
- Lata z jamnikiem. 2024.

== Essays and prose ==
- Wolność krzepi. 2018.
- Premie górskie najwyższej kategorii. 2020.
- Lotne finisze. 2023.

== Monographs ==
- Całkowita rewolucja. Status przedmiotów w poezji surrealizmu. 2015.
- Awangarda. Strajki, zakłócenia, deformacje. 2017.
- Preteksty, posłowia. Małe kanony literatury światowej. 2019.
- Niebezpieczne krajobrazy. Surrealizm i po surrealizmie. 2022.

== Editions ==
- De la lettre aux belles-lettres: études dédiées à Regina Bochenek-Franczakowa. 2012. Co-editor.
- Horyzonty wyobraźni: fantazja i fantastyczność we współczesnej kulturze. 2012. Co-editor.
- Auteur, personnage, lecteur dans les lettres d'expression française. 2014. Co-editor.
- Głuchy brudnopis. Antologia manifestów awangard Europy Środkowej. 2014. Co-editor, translator.
- Autour du théâtre / Wokół teatru. 2015. Co-editor.
- Awangarda i krytyka. Kraje Europy Środkowej i Wschodniej. 2015. Co-editor.
- Rzeczy do nazwania. Wokół Kornhausera. 2016. Co-editor.
- Le badaud et le regardeur. 2017. Co-editor.
- Tradycje eksperymentu / Eksperyment jako doświadczenie. 2019. Co-editor.
- Apollinaire – «l'esprit nouveau» – les avant-gardes. 2019. Co-editor.
- Teorie awangardy. Antologia tekstów. 2020. Co-editor.
- Najnowsze literatury romańskie. Na granicach tożsamości. 2020.
- Polityki/Awangardy. 2021. Co-editor.
- Najnowsze literatury romańskie. Samotność i wykorzenienie. 2021.
- Najnowsze literatury romańskie. Traumy, troski, opresje. 2022.
- Który tak śpiewa? Ptaki w kulturze. 2022. Co-editor.
- Orbis Pictus. Kino Europy Środkowej po 1989 roku. 2023.
- Najnowsze literatury romańskie. Powroty do przeszłości, powroty do przyszłości, powroty do powrotów. 2023.
- Nomadyczność. Podmioty – przestrzenie – pojęcia. 2024. Co-editor.

== Translations into Polish ==
- Głuchy brudnopis. Antologia manifestów awangard Europy Środkowej. 2014.
- Crudu, Dumitru (2018). Fałszywy Dymitr. With Joanna Kornaś-Warwas.
- Luca, Gherasim (2018). Bierny wampir.
- Naum, Gellu (2019). Vasco da Gama i inne cykle poetyckie.
- Todorović, Miroljub (2020). Świnia jest najlepszym pływakiem. With Kinga Siewior.
- Luca, Gherasim (2020). Kleptoobiekt śpi i inne prozy.
- Michaux, Henri (2021). Meskalina i muzyka. With Wacław Rapak.
- Komartin, Claudiu (2022). kobalt.
- Malihon, Anna (2023). Nakładanie szwów. With Krzysztof Czyżewski and others.
- Le Querrec, Perrine (2025). Warglify.

== Views ==
In a 2016 interview, Jakub Kornhauser stated that he was "disappointed (...) by the presidency" of his brother-in-law, Andrzej Duda. He remarked, "What PiS is doing with the Constitutional Tribunal amounts to a violation of the Constitution. That is clear to me, and I protest against it. I would not be surprised if President Duda were to face the State Tribunal over this."

== Awards and nominations ==
- Nomination for the Orfeusz Prize for Drożdżownia (2016)
- Wisława Szymborska Award for Drożdżownia (2016)
