= Bohdan Zadura =

Polish poet, translator and literary critic

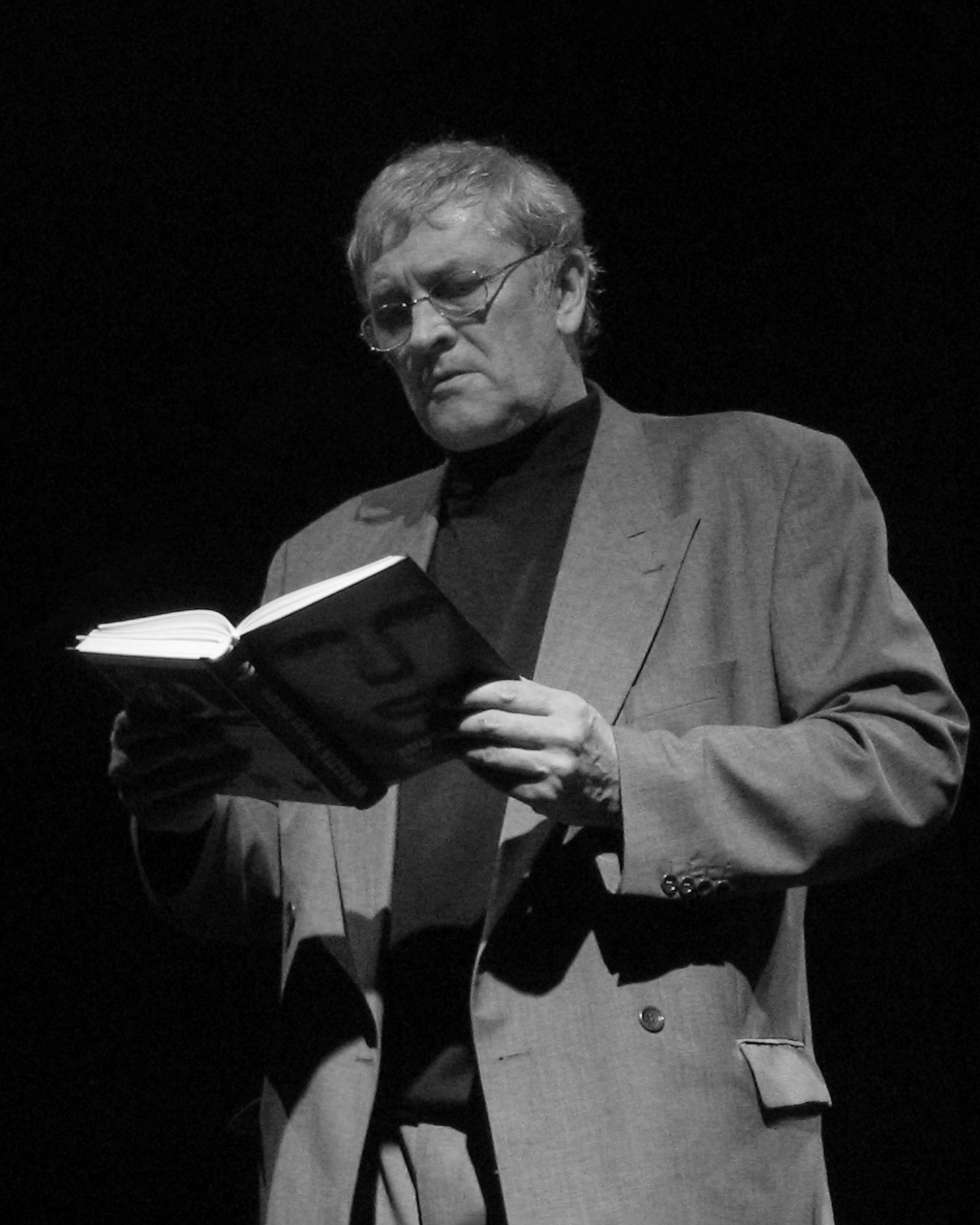
Bohdan Zadura

Bohdan Zadura (born 18 February 1945 in Puławy) is a Polish poet, translator and literary critic.

== Biography ==
Zadura debuted in 1962 in "Kamena". He was editor of the Lublin literary magazine "Akcent", from 2004 editor of "Twórczość" / Warsaw. He is a translator of poetry from the English, Ukrainian and Hungarian. Zadura had a participation in the German-Polish poets steamer 1997. Translations Zaduras into German made by Henryk Bereska, Andreas Reimann, Dieter Kalka and Doreen Daume, into Ukrainian of Dmytro Pavlychko, Andriy Bondar, Mykola Rjabchuk and Andrij Ljubka. Zadura was an honorary citizen of Puławy (2010). For the band "Nocne życie / Nightlife" him of Silesius Award was in the category "książka roku / Book of the Year" award. In 1995 he was with Wacław Waldemar Michalski and Bogusław Wróblewski initiator establishing the East Cultural Foundation "Akcent". Since October 2004 Bohdan Zadura has been the editor in chief of the monthly literary journal Twórczość.

== Works ==
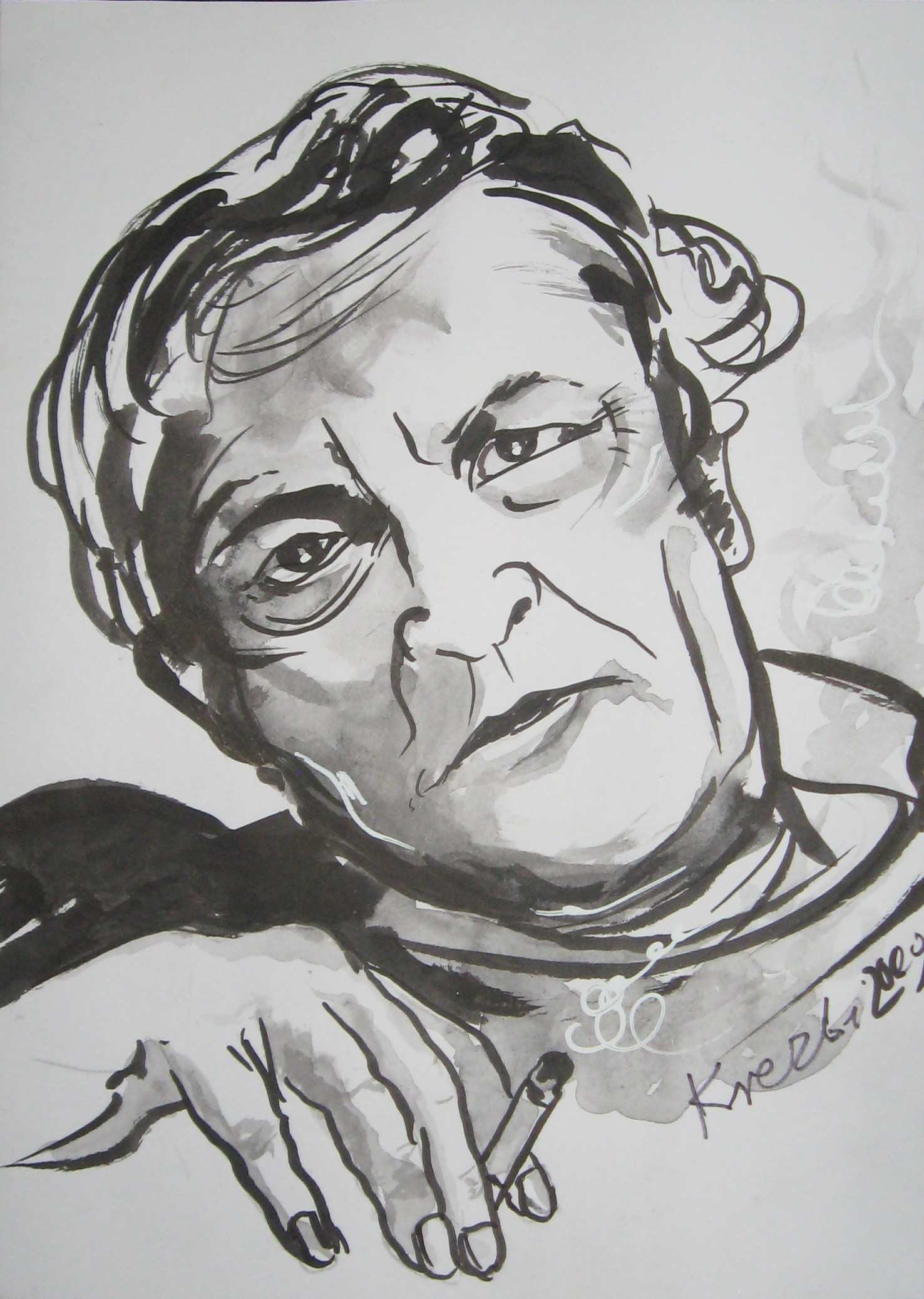
Portrait Bohdan Zaduras by Zbigniew Kresowaty

=== Poetry ===
- W krajobrazie z amfor, Czytelnik, Warszawa 1968
- Podróż morska, Czytelnik, Warszawa 1971
- Pożegnanie Ostendy, Czytelnik, Warszawa 1974
- Małe muzea, Czytelnik, Warszawa 1977
- Zejście na ląd, Czytelnik, Warszawa 1983
- Starzy znajomi, Czytelnik, Warszawa 1986
- Prześwietlone zdjęcia, Wydawnictwo Lubelskie, Lublin 1990
- Cisza, Wydawnictwo a5, Poznań 1994
- Cisza, Pomona, Wrocław 1996
- Noc poetów. Warszawa pisarzy, Centrum Sztuki – Teatr Dramatyczny, Legnica 1998
- Kaszel w lipcu, Pomona, Wrocław 2000
- Więzień i krotochwila, Zielona Sowa, Kraków 2001
- Poematy, Biuro Literackie, Legnica 2001
- Ptasia grypa, Biuro Literackie, Legnica 2002
- Kopiec kreta, Biuro Literackie, Wrocław 2002
- Stąd: wiersze puławskie, Towarzystwo Przyjaciół Puław, Puławy 2002
- Wiersze zebrane (3 tomy/3 volumes), Biuro Literackie, Wrocław 2005/2006
- Wszystko, Biuro Literackie, Wrocław 2008
- Nocne życie, Biuro Literackie, Wrocław 2010
- Zmartwychwstanie ptaszka (wiersze i sny) 2012
- Kropka nad i, Biuro Literackie, Wrocław 2014
- Najlepsze lata, 2015
- Już otwarte, Biuro Literackie, Stronie Śląskie – Wrocław 2016
- Po szkodzie, Biuro Literackie, Stronie Śląskie 2018
- Płyn Lugola, Państwowy Instytut Wydawniczy, Warszawa 2020

=== Prose ===
- Lata spokojnego słońca, Lublin: Wydawnictwo Lubelskie, 1968
- A żeby ci nie było żal, Lublin: Wydawnictwo Lubelskie, 1972
- Patrycja i chart afgański, Warsaw: Czytelnik, 1976
- Do zobaczenia w Rzymie, Warszawa: Czytelnik, 1980
- Lit, Gdańsk: Marabut, 1997
- Proza tom 1. Opowiadania/Prosa volume 1, Tales, Breslau: Biuro Literackie, 2005
- Proza tom 2. Powieści/Prosa volume 2, Novels, Breslau: Biuro Literackie, 2006

=== Essay ===
- Radość czytania (1980).
- Tadeusz Nowak (1981).
- Daj mu tam, gdzie go nie ma (1996).
- Między wierszami, Biuro Literackie, Legnica 2002
- Szkice, recenzje, felietony., Volume 1, Biuro Literackie, Wrocław 2007

=== Translations (selection) ===
- D. J. Enright, Księga Fausta, Wydawnictwo Lubelskie, Lublin 1984.
- Tony Harrison, Kumkwat dla Johna Keatsa, PIW, Warszawa 1990.
- John Ashbery, No i wiesz (1993) (with Andrzej Sosnowski and Piotr Sommer).
- D. J. Enright, Rok akademicki (1997).
- Tony Harrison, Sztuka i zagłada, Biuro Literackie, Legnica 1999
