= Jennifer Grotz =

American poet and translator (born 1971)

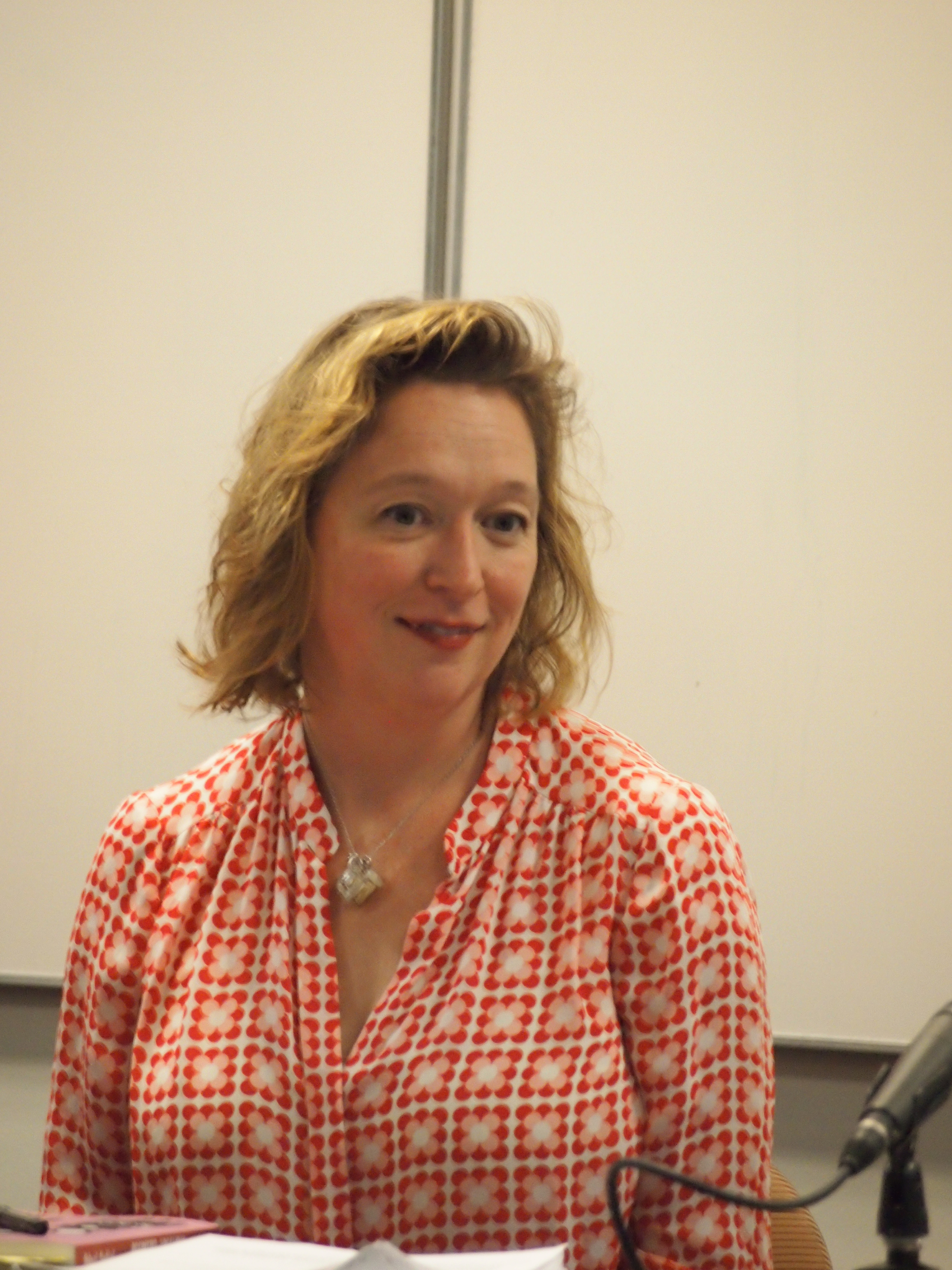
- Jennifer Grotz
- Born: July 11, 1971 (age 55); Canyon, Texas
- Occupations: Poet; Translator; Professor; Literary Critic
- Writing career
- Genre: Poetry

Jennifer Grotz (born 1971) is an American poet and translator who teaches English, creative writing, and literary translation at the University of Rochester, where she is Professor of English. In 2017 she was named the seventh director of the Bread Loaf Writers' Conference.

== Life ==
Grotz grew up in small Texas towns but has lived in France and Poland, all of which inform her poems. She graduated from Lubbock High School. She holds degrees from Tulane University (BA), Indiana University Bloomington (MA and MFA) in 1996, and the University of Houston (PhD). She also studied literature at the University of Paris (Sorbonne). She was a 2020 James Merrill House Fellow in Stonington, CT.

Her poems, translations, and reviews have appeared in many literary journals and magazines, and her work has been included in Best American Poetry. She is the first woman to direct the Bread Loaf Writers' Conferences.

She currently lives in Rochester, New York.

== Awards ==
- 1997: Fellowship in Poetry from Literary Arts, Inc.
- 2001: Individual Artist Fellowship from the Oregon Arts Commission
- 2002: Prague Summer Program Fellowship in Poetry
- 2002: Katherine Bakeless Nason Poetry Prize
- 2003: American Translators Association, Student Translation Award
- 2004: Individual Artist Grant from the Cultural Arts Council of Houston
- 2004: Texas Institute of Arts and Letters: Natalie Ornish Poetry Prize for Best First Book
- 2005: Inprint/James Michener Fellowship from the University of Houston
- 2007: Rona Jaffe Foundation Writers' Award
- 2007: Camargo Fellowship, Cassis, France
- 2007: Fellowship from the Vermont Studio Center
- 2007: New Writing Award from the Fellowship of Southern Writers
- 2013: C.P. Cavafy Poetry Prize, Poetry International
- 2016: National Endowment for the Arts, Literary Translation Fellowship
- 2017: John Simon Guggenheim Fellowship
- 2022: PEN America Award for Poetry in Translation (with Piotr Sommer), for their translation of Everything I Don't Know, Jerzy Ficowski

== Works ==
- Not Body, limited-edition letterpress poetry chapbook (Urban Editions, 2001)
- Cusp, poems (Houghton Mifflin/Mariner Books, 2003)
- The Needle, poems (Houghton Mifflin Harcourt, 2011)
- Psalms of All My Days, Patrice de La Tour du Pin, translated from the French (Carnegie Mellon UP, 2013)
- Rochester Knockings, Hubert Haddad, translated from the French (Open Letter, 2015)
- Window Left Open (Graywolf Press, 2016)
- Everything I Don't Know, Jerzy Ficowski, translated from the Polish with Piotr Sommer (World Poetry 2021)
