= Piotr Sommer =

Polish poet, essayist, and literary translator (born 1948)

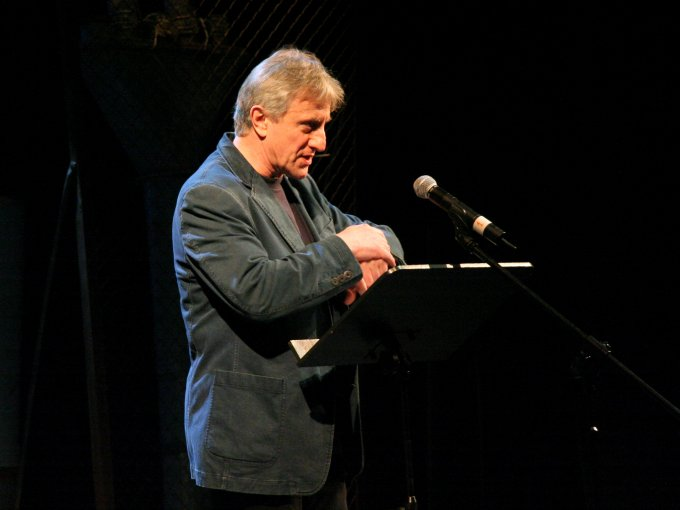
- Piotr Sommer, 2007
- Born: 13 April 1948 (age 78)
- Occupation: poet, essayist, literary translator
- Citizenship: Polish

Piotr Sommer (born 13 April 1948) is a poet, essayist and literary translator.

== Biography ==
The son of Jakub Sommer, a furrier, and Halina née Janod, an accountant.

From 2006 he was a member of the chapter of Gdynia Literary Prize. In 2015 he was the judge of the Griffin Poetry Prize.

== Poetry books ==
- W krześle. 1977.
- Pamiątki po nas. 1980.
- Przed snem. 1981. Extended edition 2008.
- Kolejny świat. 1983.
- Czynnik liryczny. 1986.
- Czynnik liryczny i inne wiersze. 1988.
- Nowe stosunki wyrazów. Wiersze z lat siedemdziesiątych i osiemdziesiątych. 1997.
- Erraty wybrane. Kwiat dzieł użytkowych. 1997.
- Piosenka pasterska. 1999.
- Rano na ziemi. Wiersze z lat 1968–1998. 2009.
- Dni i noce. 2009.
- Wiersze ze słów. 2009.
- Lata praktyki. 2022.

== Prose ==
- Środki do pielęgnacji chmur. 2024.

== Accolades ==
- Kościelski Award (1988)
- Silesius Poetry Award, Lifetime Achievement Award (2010)
- PEN Award for Poetry in Translation, with Jennifer Grotz for the translation of Everything I Don’t Know by Jerzy Ficowski (2022)

== Bibliography ==
- Piotr Śliwiński, ed. (2010). Wyrazy życia. Szkice o poezji Piotra Sommera.
