= Jakobe Mansztajn =

Polish poet and blogger (born 1982)

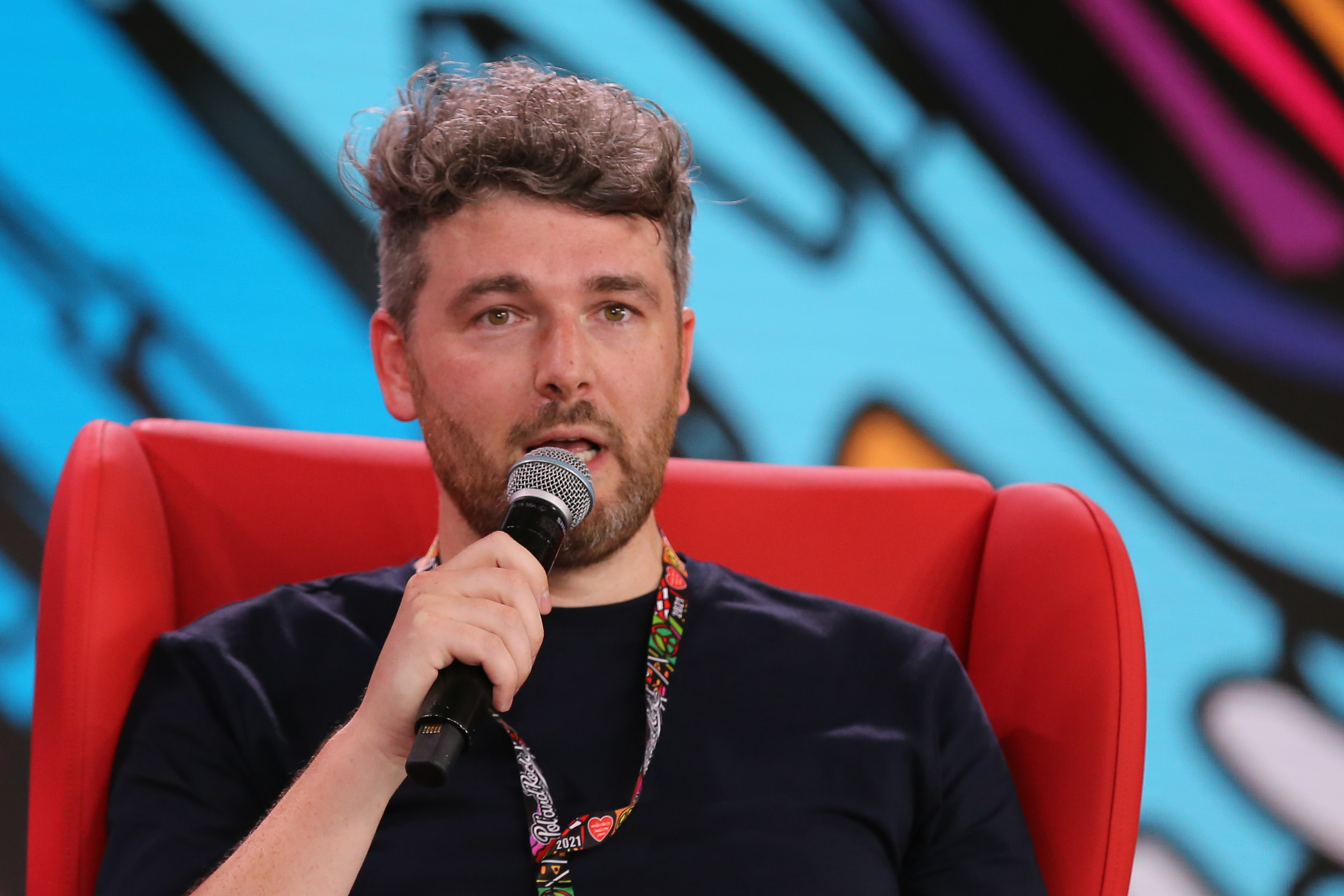
- At the Pol'and'Rock Festival in 2021
- Born: 10 February 1982 (age 44); Gdańsk, Poland
- Education: University of Gdańsk
- Occupations: poet, blogger

Jakobe Mansztajn (born February 10, 1982, in Gdańsk) is a Polish poet and blogger.

== Life and career ==
He studied psychology at the University of Gdańsk. He works as deputy editor of the literary quarterly Korespondencja z ojcem. He is the author of the poetry collection Vienna High Life (2009) for which he has received many awards, including the prestigious 2010 Wroclaw Silesius Poetry Award in the Best Debut category, the 2010 Sztorm Roku Award founded by Gazeta Wyborcza, and has also been nominated for the Gdynia Literary Prize. He was one of the initiators of the Zjednoczenie czytelnicze social campaign aimed at promoting reading books in Poland. His debut collection has been described as "one of the most distinctive in the past years in Polish literature" and gained wide critical acclaim. His works have been translated into many languages including German, Hebrew, English, Belarusian, and Norwegian.

He is a co-host of the satirical Internet TV programme Make Poland Great Again.

== Works ==
Poetry:

- Vienna High Life, Olsztyn, 2009 ISBN 978-83-60477-19-9
- Studium przypadku, Poznań, 2014

Anthologies:

- Six Poets: Twenty-eight Poems, Biblioteka Toposu, Sopot, 2011
- Free over Blood, Zeszyty Poetyckie/OFF Press, London, 2011
- Pociąg do poezji. Antologia wierszy współczesnych z motywem podróży, Kutnowski Dom Kultury, Kutno, 2011
- Narracje. 6 opowiadań o Gdańsku, Biuro Gdańsk i Metropolia Europejska Stolica Kultury, Gdańsk, 2011
- Zebrało się śliny, Biuro Literackie, Wrocław, 2016

Other publications:

- Make Life Harder, Prószyński i S-ka, Warsaw, 2015 ISBN 978-83-7961-124-9
- Make Life Harder. Przewodnik po polityce i nie tylko, ale też, Prószyński i S-ka, Warsaw, 2016 ISBN 978-83-8097-008-3

== See also ==
- List of Polish-language poets
- Polish literature
