= Julian Kornhauser =

Polish poet and literary critic (born 1946)

- Born: 20 September 1946 (age 79); Gliwice
- Citizenship: Polish
- Occupations: Poet, writer, translator, literary critic
- Children: Agata Kornhauser-Duda, Jakub Kornhauser

Julian Kornhauser (born 20 September 1946 in Gliwice, Poland) is a Polish poet, translator and literary critic.

== Biography ==
He was born to a Jewish father and a Catholic mother, Jakub and Małgorzata Kornhauser. He is an author of poems, novels and literary sketches. He also published translations of Serbian and Croatian poetry. He was among representatives of the poetic New Wave of the 1970s and a co-founder of the literary group "Teraz". He worked as a professor at the Jagiellonian University in Kraków. Through his daughter Agata Kornhauser-Duda, his son-in-law is Andrzej Duda, President of Poland for the Law and Justice party. His son Jakub Kornhauser is a poet and academic.

== Poetry books ==
- Nastanie święto i dla leniuchów. Warszawa: Wydawnictwo „Iskry”. 1972.
- W fabrykach udajemy smutnych rewolucjonistów. Kraków: Wydawnictwo Literackie. 1973.
- Zabójstwo. Kraków. 1973.
- Stan wyjątkowy. Warszawa: Państwowy Instytut Wydawniczy. 1978.
- Zjadacze Kartofli. Kraków: Wydawnictwo Literackie. 1978.
- Zasadnicze trudności. Warszawa: „Czytelnik”. 1979.
- Każdego następnego dnia. Kraków: ABC. 1981.
- Hurrraaa!. Kraków: Wydawnictwo Literackie. 1982.
- Inny porządek: 1981–1984. Kraków: Oficyna Literacka. 1985.
- Za nas, z nami. Warszawa: Czytelnik. 1985.
- Wiersze z lat osiemdziesiątych. Kraków: Wydawnictwo Literackie. 1991.
- Kamyk i cień. Poznań: a5. 1996.
- Było minęło. Warszawa: Nowy świat. 2001.
- Origami. Kraków: Wydawnictwo Literackie. 2007.
- Tylko błędy są żywe. Poznań: Wydawnictwo WBPiCAK. 2015.
- Wiersze zebrane. Poznań: Wydawnictwo WBPiCAK. 2016.

== Prose ==
- Kilka chwil. Kraków: Wydawnictwo Literackie. 1975.
- Stręczyciel idei. Kraków: Wydawnictwo Literackie. 1980.
- Dom, sen i gry dziecięce. Opowieść sentymentalna. Kraków: Znak. 1995.

== Essays and literary criticism ==
- Świat nie przedstawiony. Adam Zagajewski (co-author). Kraków: Wydawnictwo Literackie. 1974.
- Od mitu do konkretu. Szkice o modernizmie i awangardzie w poezji chorwackiej. Kraków: Wydawnictwo Literackie. 1978.
- Współczesna poezja jugosłowiańska (1941–1970). Wrocław: Zakład Narodowy im. Ossolińskich. 1980.
- Sygnalizm – propozycja serbskiej poezji eksperymentalnej. Kraków: Uniwersytet Jagielloński. 1981.
- Wspólny język. Katowice, Śląsk: Jugoslavica. 1983.
- Światło wewnętrzne. Kraków–Wrocław: Wydawnictwo Literackie. 1984.
- Strategie liryczne serbskiej awangardy. Kraków: Universitas. 1991.
- Międzyepoka. Szkice o poezji i krytyce. Kraków: Baran i Suszczyński. 1995.
- Postscriptum. Notatnik Krytyczny. Kraków: Wydawnictwo Literackie. 1999.
- Uśmiech Sfinksa. O Poezji Zbigniewa Herberta. Kraków: Wydawnictwo Literackie. 2001.
- Świadomość regionalna i mit odrębności. O stereotypach w literaturze serbskiej i chorwackiej. Kraków: „Scriptum”. 2001.
- Poezja i codzienność. Kraków: Wydawnictwo Literackie. 2003.

== Books for children ==
- Tyle rzeczy niezwykłych. Wiersze dla Agatki. Kraków: Wydawnictwo Literackie. 1981.
- Księżyc jak mandarynka. Kraków: Wydawnictwo Literackie. 2003.

== Translations into Polish ==
- Ristić, Marko (1977). Wiersze. Kraków: Wydawnictwo Literackie.
- Matić, Dušan (1980). Tajny płomień. Kraków: Wydawnictwo Literackie.
- Mihalić, Slavko (1980). Sen w świetle. Warszawa: Państwowy Instytut Wydawniczy.
- Tragarze zdań. Antologia młodej poezji serbskiej. Kraków: Wydawnictwo Literackie. 1983.
- Osti, Josip (1995). Wszystkie flagi są czarne. Sejny: Pogranicze.
- Lament nad Sarajewem. Siedmiu poetów z Bośni: Antologia poezji bośniackiej. Szczecin–Sejny: Pogranicze. 1996.

== Awards ==
In December 1999 he received Kraków Book of the Month Award for the book Postscriptum. Notatnik krytyczny.

== Bibliography ==
- Gleń, Adrian (2019). Języki rzeczywistości. O twórczości Juliana Kornhausera. Kraków: Instytut Literatury.
