= Angelus Award =

Polish literary prize

- Awarded for: best prose works written in or translated into Polish by a Central European author
- Country: Poland
- Presented by: the city of Wrocław
- Reward: PLN 150,000 (€35,000)
- First award: 2006
- Website: angelus.com.pl

The Angelus Central European Literature Award also known as Angelus Award (Polish: Nagroda Literacka Europy Środkowej Angelus) is a Polish international literary award established in 2006 and presented by the city of Wrocław, Lower Silesia. The award is given annually for best prose books written in or translated into the Polish language by a living author originating from Central Europe whose works "undertake themes most relevant to the present day, encourage reflection and deepen the knowledge of the world of other cultures."

The winners of the award receive a cash prize amounting to PLN 150,000 (€35,000) and a statuette designed by sculptor Ewa Rossano. Writers eligible for the award must come from Central European countries including Albania, Austria, Belarus, Bosnia and Herzegovina, Bulgaria, Croatia, the Czech Republic, Estonia, Germany, Hungary, Latvia, Lithuania, Moldova, Montenegro, North Macedonia, Poland, Romania, Russia, Serbia, Slovakia, Slovenia, Ukraine.

Members of the jury selecting the laureates of the award have included Ryszard Krynicki, Mykola Riabchuk, Natalya Gorbanevskaya, Stanisław Bereś, Julian Kornhauser, Irek Grin and Krzysztof Koelher.

== List of Angelus Laureates ==
Year	Name	Country	Original title	Polish title	English title	Translator(s)	Ref.
2026	Kateřina Tučková	Czech Republic	Bílá Voda			Julia Różewicz	
2025	Darko Cvijetić	Bosnia and Herzegovina	Schindlerov lift	Winda Schindlera		Dorota Jovanka Ćirlić	
2024	Monika Helfer	Austria	Die Bagage	Hałastra	Last House Before the Mountain	Arkadiusz Żychliński	
2023	Saša Stanišić	Germany / Bosnia and Herzegovina	Herkunft (Note: Originally written in German. The translated Bosnian and Serbian title is Porijeklo.)	Skąd	Where You Come From	Małgorzata Gralińska	
2022	Edward Pasewicz	Poland	Pulverkopf		Pulverkopf	–	
2021	Kateryna Babkina	Ukraine	Мій дід танцював краще за всіх	Nikt tak nie tańczył, jak mój dziadek	My Grandfather Danced the Best	Bohdan Zadura	
2020	Goran Vojnović	Slovenia	Jugoslavija, moja dežela	Moja Jugosławia	Yugoslavia, My Homeland	Joanna Pomorska	
2019	Georgi Gospodinov	Bulgaria	Физика на тъгата	Fizyka smutku	The Physics of Sorrow	Magdalena Pytlak	
2018	Maciej Płaza	Poland	Robinson w Bolechowie		Robinson in Bolechów	–	
2017	Oleg Pavlov	Russia	Карагандинские девятины, или Повесть последних дней	Opowieści z ostatnich dni	Tales From the Last Days	Wiktor Dłuski	
2016	Varujan Vosganian	Romania	Cartea șoaptelor	Księga szeptów	The Book of Whispers	Joanna Kornaś-Warwas	
2015	Serhiy Zhadan	Ukraine	Месопотамія	Mezopotamia	Mesopotamia	Michał Petryk and Adam Pomorski	
2014	Pavol Rankov	Slovakia	Stalo sa prvého septembra (alebo inokedy)	Zdarzyło się pierwszego września (albo kiedy indziej)	It Happened On September the First	Tomasz Grabiński	
2013	Oksana Zabuzhko	Ukraine	Музей покинутих секретів	Muzeum porzuconych sekretów	The Museum of Abandoned Secrets	Katarzyna Kotyńska	
2012	Miljenko Jergović	Bosnia and Herzegovina	Srda pjeva, u sumrak, na Duhove	Srda śpiewa o zmierzchu w Zielone Świątki	Srda Sings At Dusk on Pentecost	Magdalena Petryńska	
2011	Svetlana Alexievich	Belarus	У войны не женское лицо (Note: Originally written in Russian. The translated Belarusian title is У вайны не жаночае аблічча (1991 edition) or У вайны не жаночы твар (2019 edition).)	Wojna nie ma w sobie nic z kobiety	The Unwomanly Face of War	Jerzy Czech	
2010	György Spiró	Hungary	Messiások	Mesjasze	Messiahs	Elżbieta Cygielska	
2009	Josef Škvorecký	Czech Republic	Příběh inženýra lidských duší	Przypadki inżyniera ludzkich dusz	The Engineer of Human Souls	Andrzej Jagodziński	
2008	Péter Esterházy	Hungary	Harmonia cælestis		Celestial Harmonies: A Novel	Teresa Worowska	
2007	Martin Pollack	Austria	Der Tote im Bunker: Bericht über meinen Vater	Śmierć w bunkrze – opowieść o moim ojcu	Dead Man in the Bunker: Discovering My Father	Andrzej Kopacki	
2006	Yurii Andrukhovych	Ukraine	Дванадцять обручів	Dwanaście kręgów	Twelve Circles	Katarzyna Kotyńska	

== Laureates by country ==
Country	Number
Ukraine	4
Bosnia and Herzegovina	3
Austria	2
Czech Republic	2
Hungary	2
Poland	2
Belarus	1
Bulgaria	1
Germany	1
Romania	1
Russia	1
Slovakia	1
Slovenia	1

== Other finalists ==
Year	Author	Country	Original title	Polish title
2026	Uładzimir Arłou	Belarus	Танцы на горадам: Тры аповесці	Tańce nad miastem. Trzy opowieści
2026	Joanna Czeczott	Poland	Cisza nad stepem. Kazachstan i pamięć o Rosji	
2026	Georgi Gospodinov	Bulgaria	Градинарят и смъртта	Ogrodnik i śmierć
2026	Yuliia Iliukha	Ukraine	Мої жінки	Moje kobiety
2026	Milena Marković	Serbia	Deca	Dzieci
2026	Serhiy Zhadan	Ukraine	Арабески	Arabeski
2025	Inga Gaile	Latvia	Jaukumiņš	Skarbeniek
2025	Yevhenia Kuznietsova	Ukraine	Драбина	Drabina
2025	Fatos Lubonja	Albania	Ridënimi	Drugi wyrok
2025	Clemens J. Setz	Austria	Der Trost runder Dinge	Pociecha rzeczy okrągłych
2025	Leelo Tungal	Estonia	Samet ja saepuru	Mała towarzyszka i listy
2025	Joanna Wilengowska	Poland	Król Warmii i Saturna	
2024	Andrey Kurkov	Ukraine	Серые пчёлы (Note: Originally written in Russian. The translated Ukrainian title is Сірі бджоли.)	Szare pszczoły
2024	Małgorzata Lebda	Poland	Łakome	
2024	Tomasz Różycki	Poland	Złodzieje żarówek	
2024	Oleg Serebrian	Moldova	Pe contrasens	Pod prąd
2024	Tatiana Țîbuleac	Moldova	Grădina de sticlă	Szklany ogród
2024	Benedek Totth	Hungary	Holtverseny	Trupi bieg
2023	Stanislav Aseyev	Ukraine	«Світлий шлях»: Історія одного концтабору (Note: Ukrainian title. Originally written but never published in Russian.)	Świetlana Droga. Obóz koncentracyjny w Doniecku
2023	Tamara Duda	Ukraine	Доця	Córeczka
2023	Katarína Kucbelová	Slovakia	Čepiec	Czepiec
2023	Zyta Rudzka	Poland	Ten się śmieje, kto ma zęby	
2023	Judith Schalansky	Germany	Verzeichnis einiger Verluste	Spis paru strat
2023	Piotr Siemion	Poland	Bella, ciao	
2022	Alhierd Bacharevič	Belarus	Сарока на шыбеніцы	Sroka na szubienicy
2022	Kapka Kassabova	Bulgaria	To the Lake: A Balkan Journey of War and Peace (Note: Originally written in English. The translated Bulgarian title is Към езерото.)	W stronę Ochrydy. Podróż przez wojnę i pokój
2022	Zoltán Mihály Nagy	Hungary	A sátán fattya	Szatański pomiot
2022	Jaroslav Rudiš	Czech Republic	Winterbergs letzte Reise (Note: Originally written in German. The translated Czech title is Winterbergova poslední cesta.)	Ostatnia podróż Winterberga
2022	Andrzej Stasiuk	Poland	Przewóz	
2022	Katarzyna Surmiak-Domańska	Poland	Czystka	
2021	Michał Komar	Poland	Skrywane	
2021	Sergey Lebedev	Russia	Дебютант	Debiutant
2021	Sigitas Parulskis	Lithuania	Tamsa ir partneriai	Ciemność i partnerzy
2021	Volodymyr Rafeyenko	Ukraine	Долгота дней (Note: Originally written in Russian. The translated Ukrainian title is Довгі часи.)	Najdłuższe czasy
2021	Mirosław Tryczyk	Poland	Drzazga. Kłamstwa silniejsze niż śmierć	
2021	Petro Yatsenko	Ukraine	Магнетизм	Magnetyzm
2020	Kapka Kassabova	Bulgaria	Border: A Journey to the Edge of Europe (Note: Originally written in English. The translated Bulgarian title is Граница.)	Granica. Na krawędzi Europy
2020	Sergey Lebedev	Russia	Гусь Фриц	Dzieci Kronosa
2020	Mikołaj Łoziński	Poland	Stramer	
2020	Tanya Malyarchuk	Ukraine	Забуття	Zapomnienie
2020	Paweł Piotr Reszka	Poland	Płuczki. Poszukiwacze żydowskiego złota	
2020	Serhiy Zhadan	Ukraine	Інтернат	Internat
2019	Bianca Bellová	Czech Republic	Jezero	Jezioro
2019	Sergey Lebedev	Russia	Предел забвения	Granica zapomnienia
2019	Christoph Ransmayr	Austria	Cox oder Der Lauf der Zeit	Cesarski zegarmistrz
2019	Marianna Salzmann	Germany	Außer sich	Poza siebie
2019	Yuriy Vynnychuk	Ukraine	Танґо смерті	Tango śmierci
2019	Polina Zherebtsova	Russia	Муравей в стеклянной банке. Чеченские дневники 1994–2004	Mrówka w słoiku. Dzienniki czeczeńskie 1994–2004
2018	Antonín Bajaja	Czech Republic	Na krásné modré Dřevnici	Nad piękną, modrą Dřevnicą
2018	Weronika Gogola	Poland	Po trochu	
2018	Péter Nádas	Hungary	Emlékiratok könyve	Pamięć
2018	Artur Nowaczewski	Poland	Hostel Nomadów	
2018	Lutz Seiler	Germany	Kruso	
2018	Marian Sworzeń	Poland	Czarna ikona. Biełomor. Kanał Białomorski. Dzieje. Ludzie. Słowa	
2017	Filip Florian	Romania	Zilele regelui	Dni króla
2017	Andriy Lyubka	Ukraine	Карбід	Karbid
2017	Stanisław Aleksander Nowak	Poland	Galicyanie	
2017	Faruk Šehić	Bosnia and Herzegovina	Knjiga o Uni	Książka o Unie
2017	Monika Sznajderman	Poland	Fałszerze pieprzu. Historia rodzinna	
2017	Andrea Tompa	Hungary	A hóhér háza	Dom kata
2016	Maciej Hen	Poland	Solfatara	
2016	Anna Janko	Poland	Mała zagłada	
2016	Uladzimir Nyaklyayew	Belarus	Аўтамат з газіроўкай з сіропам і без	Automat z wodą gazowaną z syropem lub bez
2016	Kristina Sabaliauskaitė	Lithuania	Silva rerum	
2016	Alvydas Šlepikas	Lithuania	Mano vardas — Marytė	Mam na imię Marytė
2016	Cristian Teodorescu	Romania	Medgidia, orașul de apoi	Medgidia, miasto u kres
2015	Jacek Dehnel	Poland	Matka Makryna	
2015	Drago Jančar	Slovenia	To noč sem jo videl	Widziałem ją tej nocy
2015	Andrzej Stasiuk	Poland	Wschód	
2015	Ziemowit Szczerek	Poland	Siódemka	
2015	Lucian Dan Teodorovici	Romania	Matei Brunul	
2015	Olga Tokarczuk	Poland	Księgi Jakubowe	
2014	Elena Chizhova	Russia	Время женщин	Czas kobiet
2014	Oleksandr Irvanets	Ukraine	Хвороба Лібенкрафта	Choroba Libenkrafta
2014	Ismail Kadare	Albania	Aksidenti	Wypadek
2014	Wiesław Myśliwski	Poland	Ostatnie rozdanie	
2014	Martin Šmaus	Czech Republic	Děvčátko, rozdělej ohníček	Dziewczynko, roznieć ogieniek
2014	Jáchym Topol	Czech Republic	Chladnou zemí	Warsztat diabła
2013	Karl-Markus Gauß	Austria	Im Wald der Metropolen	W gąszczu metropolii
2013	Kazimierz Orłoś	Poland	Dom pod Lutnią	
2013	Lyudmila Petrushevskaya	Russia	Время ночь	Jest noc
2013	Jerzy Pilch	Poland	Dziennik	
2013	Andrzej Stasiuk	Poland	Grochów	
2013	Szczepan Twardoch	Poland	Morfina	
2012	Andriy Bondar	Ukraine	—N/a	Historie ważne i nieważne
2012	Jacek Dehnel	Poland	Saturn. Czarne obrazy z życia mężczyzn z rodziny Goya	
2012	László Krasznahorkai	Hungary	Háború és háború	Wojna i wojna
2012	Magdalena Tulli	Poland	Włoskie szpilki	
2012	Michał Witkowski	Poland	Drwal	
2012	Tomáš Zmeškal	Czech Republic	Milostný dopis klínovým písmem	List miłosny pismem klinowym
2011	Natalka Babina	Belarus	Рыбін горад	Miasto ryb
2011	Jenny Erpenbeck	Germany	Heimsuchung	Klucz do ogrodu
2011	Drago Jančar	Slovenia	Katarina, pav in jezuit	Katarina, paw i jezuita
2011	Ismail Kadare	Albania	Qorrfermani	Ślepy ferman
2011	Maria Matios	Ukraine	Солодка Даруся	Słodka Darusia
2011	Wojciech Tochman	Poland	Dzisiaj narysujemy śmierć	
2010	Wojciech Albiński	Poland	Achtung! Banditen!	
2010	Jacek Dukaj	Poland	Wroniec	
2010	Zbigniew Kruszyński	Poland	Ostatni raport	
2010	Antoni Libera	Poland	Godot i jego cień	
2010	Norman Manea	Romania	Întoarcerea huliganului	Powrót chuligana
2010	Eginald Schlattner	Romania	Das Klavier im Nebel (Note: Originally written in German. The translated Romanian title is Clavir în ceață.)	Fortepian we mgle
2009	Ihar Babkou	Belarus	Адам Клакоцкі і ягоные цені	Adam Kłakocki i jego cienie
2009	Ota Filip	Czech Republic	Sousedé a ti ostatní	Sąsiedzi i ci inni
2009	Inga Iwasiów	Poland	Bambino	
2009	Miljenko Jergović	Bosnia and Herzegovina	Ruta Tannenbaum	
2009	Bernhard Schlink	Germany	Die Heimkehr	Powrót do domu
2009	Krzysztof Varga	Poland	Gulasz z turula	
2008	Günter Grass	Germany	Beim Häuten der Zwiebel	Przy obieraniu cebuli
2008	László Krasznahorkai	Hungary	Az ellenállás melankóliája	Melancholia sprzeciwu
2008	Małgorzata Szejnert	Poland	Czarny ogród	
2008	Olga Tokarczuk	Poland	Bieguni	
2008	Svetlana Vasilenko	Russia	Дурочка	Głuptaska
2008	Juli Zeh	Germany	Spieltrieb	Instynkt gry
2007	Oleksandr Irvanets	Ukraine	Рівне/Ровно	Riwne/Rowno
2007	Ismail Kadare	Albania	Pallati i ëndrrave	Pałac snów
2007	Imre Kertész	Hungary	Gályanapló	Dziennik galernika
2007	Hanna Krall	Poland	Król kier znów na wylocie	
2007	Mariusz Szczygieł	Poland	Gottland	
2007	Dubravka Ugrešić	Croatia	Ministarstvo boli	Ministerstwo bólu

== See also ==
- Silesius Poetry Award
- Zbigniew Herbert International Literary Award
- Polish literature
