= Zmeskal =

Zmeskal or Zmeškal (Czech feminine: Zmeškalová) is a surname. Notable people with the surname include:

- Kim Zmeskal (born 1976), American gymnast and gymnastics coach
- Tomáš Zmeškal (born 1966), Czech writer
