= Letter to Khodorkovsky =

The Letter to Khodorkovsky is a 2013 open letter from the writer Polina Zherebtsova to the Russian businessman and exiled political critic Mikhail Khodorkovsky. Over half a million people in Russia read the letter.

Polina signs petition "Putin must go".

Polina Zherebtsova (Russian: Жеребцова Полина, March 20, 1985, Grozny, USSR) is a writer, poet, and author, well known for penning The Diary of Polina Zherebtsova. Polina was an Andrei Sakharov Prize finalist "Journalism as an act of Conscience" in 2012. She was born in a mixed ethnic family in Grozny, Chechen-Ingush Autonomous Republic, USSR.

Author of the Report on war crimes in Chechnya in 1994–2004. ru. eng.

== Letter ==
Mikhail Khodorkovsky, I am writing to you from Finland. My name is Polina Zherebtsova. I am a political refugee from Russia. From contemporary Russia, which for many, many years has been ruled by Mr. Putin.

All my life I have kept a diary. And it so happened that I was born in the Caucasus, in the city of Grozny.

When I was nine years old my city was surrounded by a ring of Russian tanks – and houses were turned into ruins and ashes along with their inhabitants. Has your home been shelled by a tank, Mr Khodorkovsky? Mine was. The upper floors of the apartment building were on fire, and children were screaming in unbearable pain: shrapnel tore their bodies.

My grandfather, a veteran of the Second World War, was in the hospital on Pervomayskaya Street, but was killed in the shelling. He was recovering – my mother and I were going to take him home.

We could not bury him for a week. There was fighting.

I know you have been through a lot, have been imprisoned. But tell me – can you imagine how the patients scream when the guns are firing at their hospital or when a jet bomber, invisible and invulnerable to their curses, drops a one-and-a-half ton bomb on them?

We looked for where the snow was cleaner, gathered it up and strained it through cloth so we would drink it. It was not white snow, not at all like the snow I can see just now in Finland. It was dark gray and bitter, because there were burning buildings all around. An oil plant was on fire, and whole neighborhoods of homes were burning. Before they reached living human flesh, the bombs tore up stone and concrete.

And the houses were full of people, and they had nowhere to run to.

We fell from hunger, lying about in the corners of apartments, half submerged in basements. And the rats huddled against the cold at our feet and squeaked.

The rats slept with me in the hallway on the icy wooden floor, and I didn't chase them away, realizing that even they were suffering from "Russian democracy" Our cats died, unable to withstand the diet of pickled tomatoes we fed them once every few days.

To get at least some food, you had to walk about in other people's basements, where the conquerors had left thin silver threads, and if you stepped on one of those threads you would go straight to heaven.

And do you want to hear how I stood near the concrete slabs under which for three days in the centre of Grozny, choking in the wreckage and cement dust, Russian old folk died?

No one was able to raise the slabs and remove the debris! People wept and prayed, but could not do anything. Those who died under the ruins of their houses did not get a grave in "the land we won." This hell was repeated many times in ten years: as long as the war lasted in the Caucasus, in the Chechen Republic.

In August 1996 rockets from a Russian military post flew into the staircase of our apartment building: our neighbours were blown to pieces. I was eleven years old at the time.

I came out into the front entrance of our building and my feet sank ankle-deep in blood. Blood dripped from the walls and ceiling, and I could hear the surviving neighbours screaming in terrible agony. Since then, Mr Khodorkovsky, I do not believe Russia's rulers. I do not think that this is the price of conquering the land and preserving its integrity. This was done by "weaklings" – because a strong man will not assert himself at the expense of the lives of women and children.

Essentially they are traitors of their own people.

In 1999, when the "humanitarian corridors" of refugees were shelled, burning people alive in buses, we could not get out of the city. And on October 21, 1999 Grozny market was hit by a rocket. In the afternoon, when thousands of people were crowded there.

It was later announced that this was a "market of terrorists" with whom the invaders were fighting.

"Terrorists" was the name they gave to the children, the old folk and women who traded vegetables, sweets, bread, cigarettes, newspapers, etc. And the market was called the "arms market," but I never saw weapons there, although sometimes I would spend a whole day going round all the stalls with a box of stuff.

During the holidays or after school I could not rest – I had to work in order to survive.

I traded in that market place. There were no pensions, no salaries. People did their best to survive. For a year my mother received no salary. It was stolen. And we traded in order to survive and buy bread.

They did not have to start "conquering us", turning our lives into one continuous strip of hell. Our lives were already hard enough without bombs and "Grad" installations. When the rocket hit Grozny market I was three blocks away from the place where it landed. I saw fire from the ground to the sky, and then I heard a deafening explosion.

In my legs there were sixteen fragments of shrapnel.

And what happened to the people who were closer to the rocket? Severed arms, legs, heads, bodies turned to dust.

The children found their mother by her hairpins or the buttons on her jacket...

Did anyone get an apology? Or compensation for this hell? Did anyone?

I got nothing except threats and being told to "shut your mouth", as I was a true witness to these bloody events. Here is the face of the modern Russian government.

Killing, slandering and grabbing. And this is called "conquest"?

In 2000, On January 19, the surviving neighbours and my mother and I were threatened with execution by firing squad.

We were on the edge of a cliff and the soldiers fired over our heads.

Our old granny neighbour fell to her knees, crying:

"What are you doing? We're your people! We're Russians! Don't shoot!"

The Caucasus is a peculiar region. In it, cultures and ethnicities, ways of life and cuisines, have been interwoven.

Of the forty-eight apartments in our building ten were Chechen and the rest – Russian, Armenian, Gypsy, Azeri, Ingush, Jewish, Polish...

We lived together amicably until the war began. The war swept everything away: life, friendship, love. It destroyed everything.

Surviving in inhuman conditions, people from the Chechen Republic n the other regions of Russia faced and still face the most vile discrimination, persecution and threats.

The authorities have no time for their stories of mass executions and extrajudicial kilings. All, regardless of ethnicity, are classed as "Chechens."

I have come up against this, too.

For about a year I was refused a passport. But you got one in a single day, and were even kindly driven to the gangway of a private jet. Double standards – those are precisely what distinguish despotism from democracy...

I was very sympathetic to you when you were in prison. I considered the sentences you were given unjust, political. Even now I think that you may have been subjected to pressure. But you in your interview you said: "Putin is no weakling. I am ready to fight in order to keep the North Caucasus as part of our country. This is our land, we conquered and won it!" Consider: now you will have to share responsibility for those war crimes, which in the Caucasus are not the costs of "conquest", but its essence.

Read my diary.

Read how we were conquered.

How we buried our murdered neighbours under fire, having first covered the graves with branches so that the hungry dogs would not tear the bodies apart.

How thousands of women and children were murdered in the Chechen Republic.

Do you still want integration with such a Russia?

I do not.

And I do not need their citizenship. I am embarrassed by it, like the shameful brand-mark on a slave.

Polina Zherebtsova

23.12.2013

Original letter in Russian
