= Edward Pasewicz =

Polish writer, poet, and composer

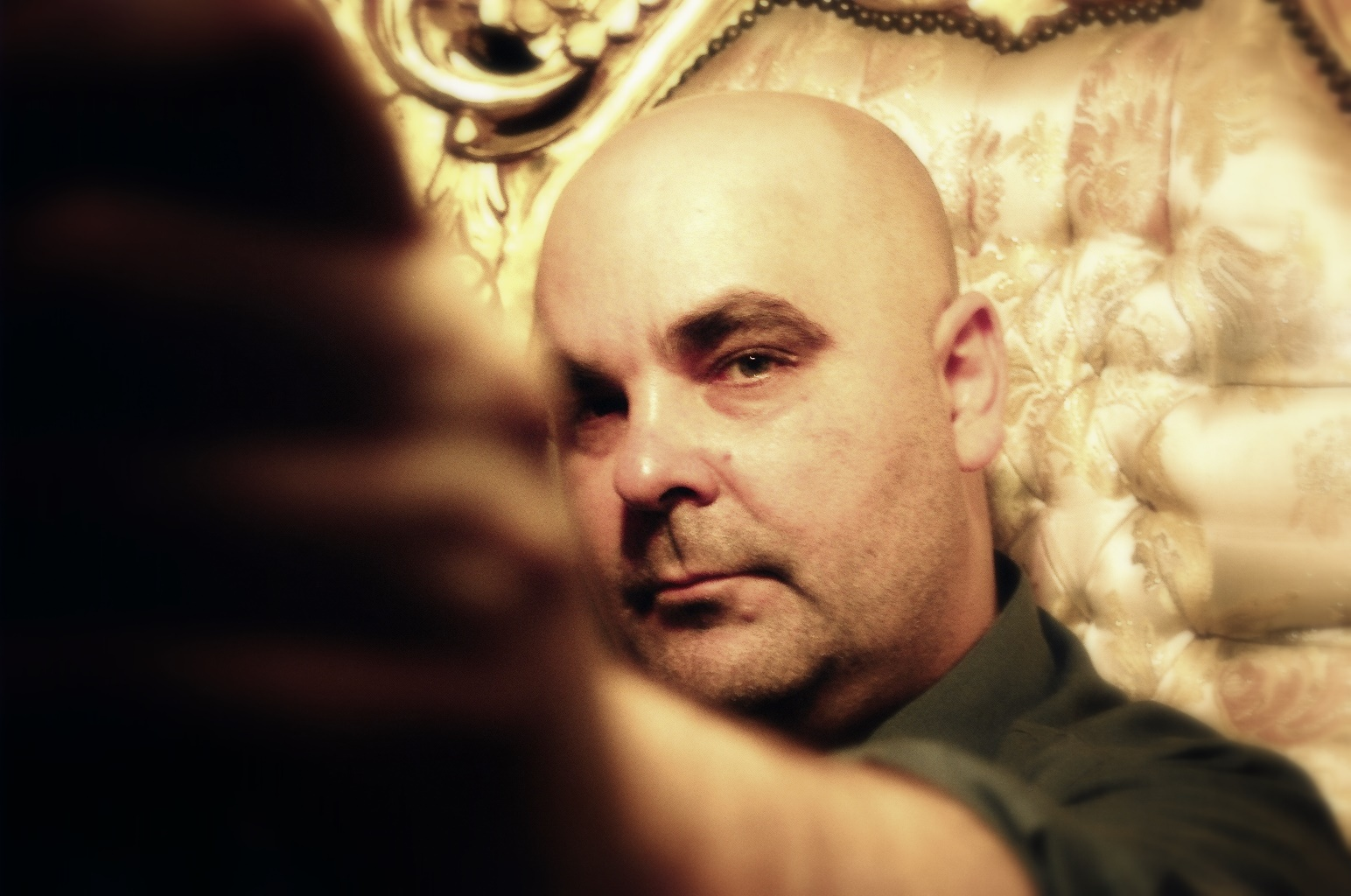
- Born: 9 June 1971 (age 55); Kostrzyn nad Odrą, Poland
- Occupations: Poet, writer, composer

Edward Pasewicz (born 9 June 1971) is a Polish writer, poet and composer.

His poems were translated into several languages: German, English, Czech, Bulgarian, Slovenian, Serbian, Italian, Spanish, Catalan, Ukrainian and Russian. In 2011 he was granted a scholarship from Ministry of Culture and National Heritage (Poland).

He is Buddhist, learner of Ole Nydahl. Since 2011, he has been a director of "Scena 21" in Kraków, Poland. He has been living in Kraków since July 2010.

== Works ==
- Dolna Wilda (Anima, Tygiel Kultury 2001; Poznań, Wielkopolska Biblioteka Poetów 2006)
- Nauki dla żebraków (added to magazine "Topos" nr 4-5/2003)
- Wiersze dla Róży Filipowicz (Wrocław, Biuro Literackie 2004)
- th (Kielce, kserokopia.art.pl 2005)
- Henry Berryman Pięśni (Kielce, kserokopia.art.pl 2006)
- Śmierć w darkroomie (Kraków, EMG 2007)
- Drobne! Drobne! (Poznań, WBPiCAK 2008)
- Muzyka na instrumenty strunowe, perkusję i czelestę (Poznań, WBPICAK 2010, Wielkopolska Biblioteka Poezji tom 20)
- Pałacyk Bertolta Brechta (Kraków, EMG 2011)
- Lamentacje Londyńskie (2010)
- Trzej Bracia (2011)
- Zero jeden
- Putinka
- Czynny do odwołania

== Accolades ==
Laureate of VIII edition of Ogólnopolski Konkurs Poetycki im. Jacka Bierezina (2000). In 2007, he was nominated to Gdynia Literary Prize for a book Henry Berryman Pięśni. In 2022, he was awarded the Angelus Award for his novel Pulverkopf. In March 2025 he received Kraków Book of the Month Award for the book Czarne wesele.
