= Polina Zherebtsova =

Chechen Russian documentarian, poet, and author

- Полина Жеребцова
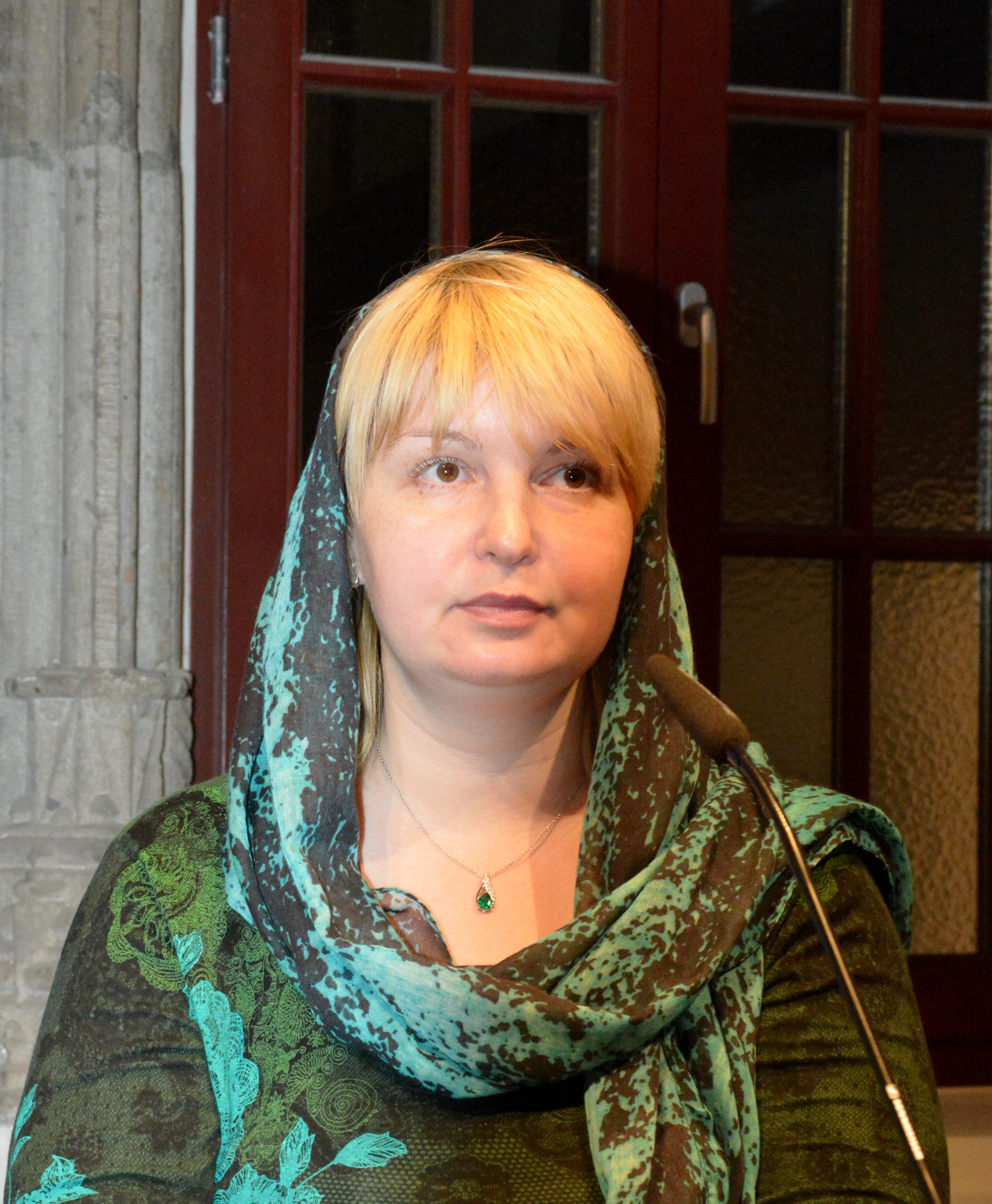
- Born: 20 March 1985; Grozny, Russian SFSR, Soviet Union
- Occupations: Novelist, poet, diarist, journalist
- Writing career
- Language: Russian, Chechen

Polina Zherebtsova (Russian: Полина Викторовна Жеребцова, IPA: [pɐˈlʲinə ʐɨrʲɪpˈt͡sovə]; 20 March 1985) is a Chechen Russian diarist and poet. She is the author of Ant in a Glass Jar, covering her childhood, adolescence and youth that witnessed two Chechen wars.

She was born in a mixed ethnic family in Grozny, Chechen-Ingush Autonomous Republic, USSR. In 2002, she began to work as a journalist. She is a member of PEN International and the Union of Journalists of Russia. She has been awarded the Janusz Korczak international prize in Jerusalem in two categories (narrative and documentary prose). In 2012, she was awarded Andrei Sakharov Award "For Journalism as an Act of Conscience". In 2013, she received political asylum in Finland.

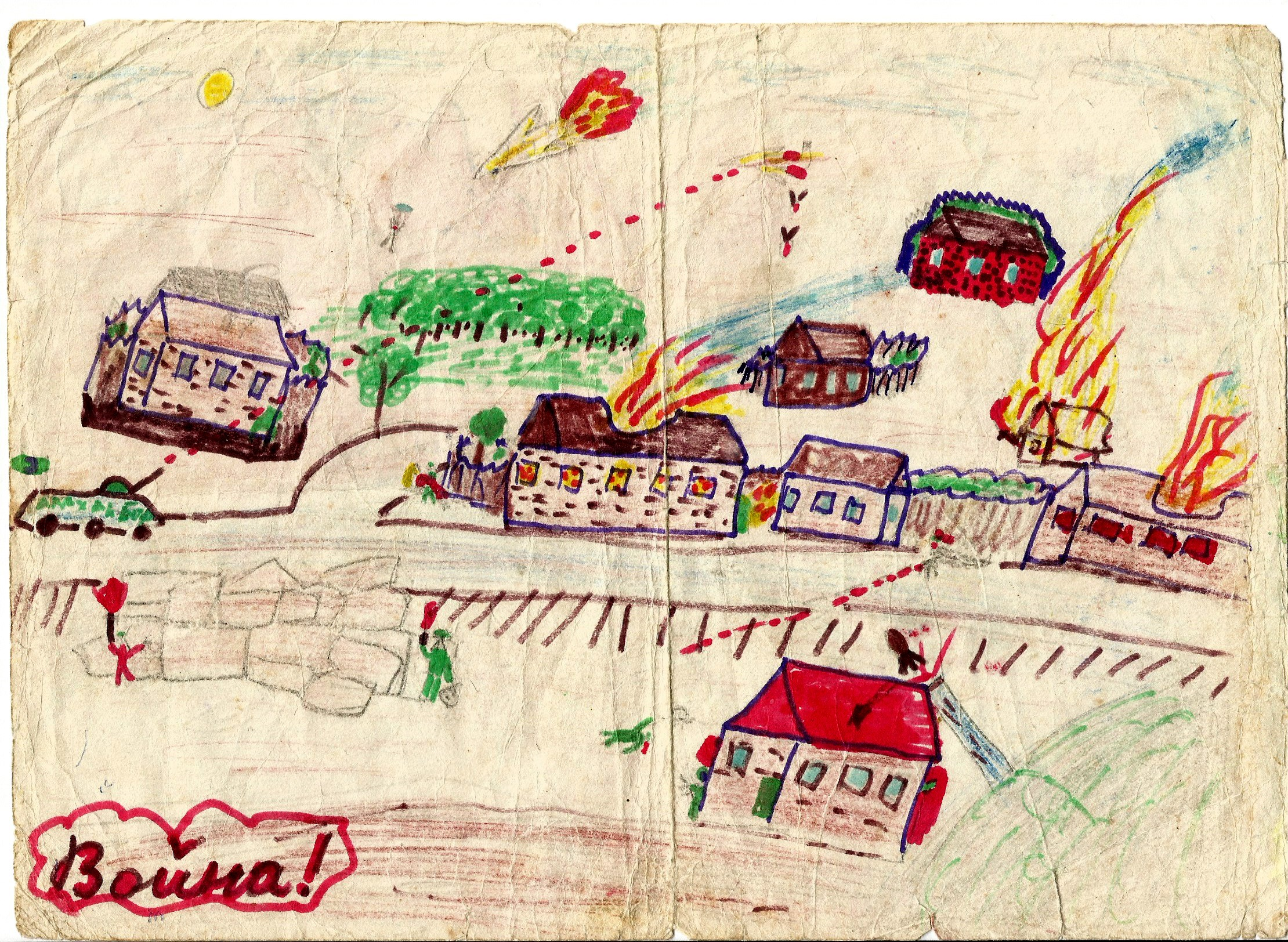
A picture drawn by Polina Zherebtsova in 1995, depicting the Battle of Grozny.

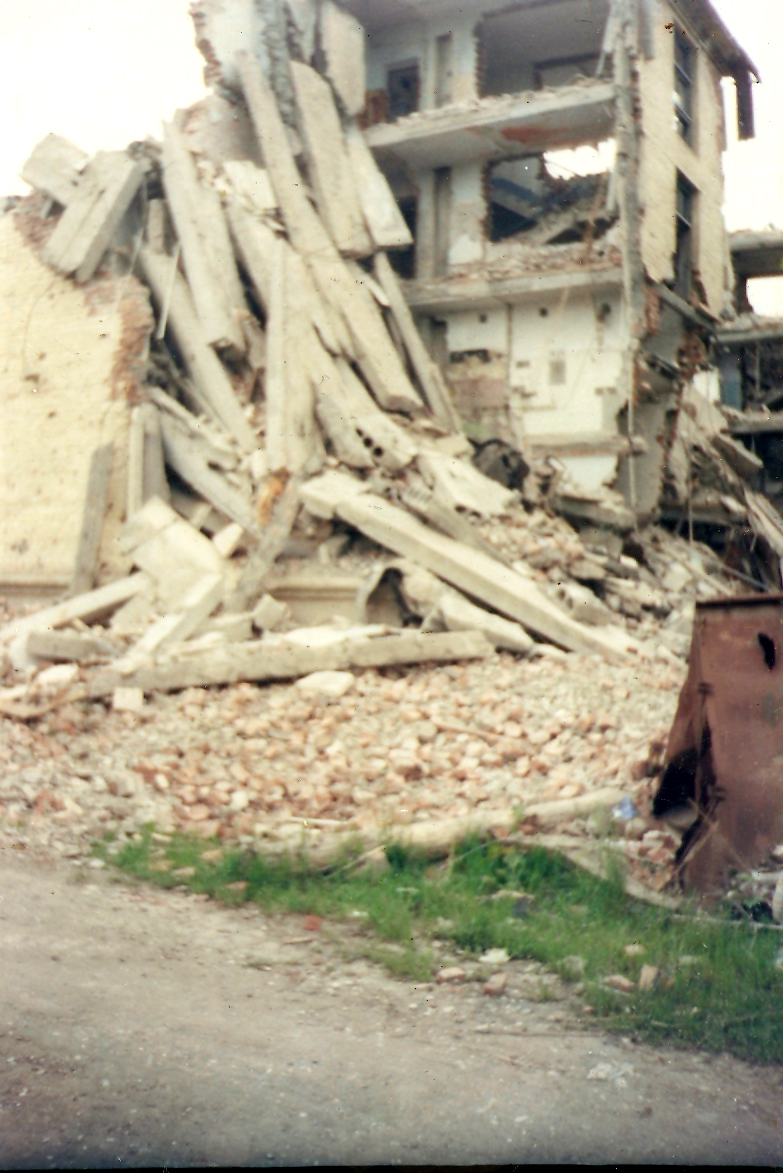
A photo of a house taken by Polina.

Author of a Report on war crimes in Chechnya in 1994–2004. ru. eng.

Polina was born in Grozny, USSR, and started her first diary on 25 March 1994, days after turning nine, at the start of the First Chechen War. She was still living in Grozny when the Second Chechen War began. On 21 October 1999, the market in Grozny was shelled where she was helping her mother sell newspapers, and Polina was moderately injured.

Politkovskaya described war as a journalist from the outside. Polina Zherebtsova writes about war from inside the heart of darkness. Der Spiegel №10 /2015.

Ant in a glass jar. Chechen diaries of 1994–2004 has been translated into Ukrainian, Slovenian, French, Lithuanian, Finnish, German, Georgian, and Chechen.

Polina Zherebtsova has given interviews to the BBC, The Guardian, Reuters, has participated in literary festivals around the world.

She has always offered publishing rights for translations of all of her books by herself, without the use of services of literary agents.

== Biography ==
She came from a family of Chechens and Ukrainians. She calls herself a cosmopolitan.

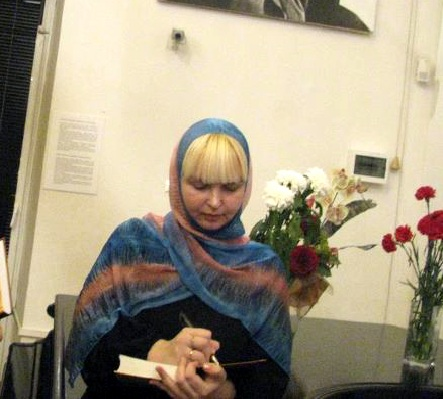
Polina Zherebtsova, Moscow 2011

Polina's father was a lawyer, who died when Polina was a child. Her mother, Elena, worked as a senior goods manager at a large company. She devoted her spare time to her daughter's education. Polina grew in a family that equally revered books like the Torah, the Bible and the Koran. Since childhood, she had studied religion, history, and philosophy.

Polina Zherebtsova was born in 1985 in Grozny and lived there for almost twenty years. She considers herself a cosmopolitan as she has multi-national ancestry. Polina's father died when she was very young. Polina's maternal grandfather Zherebtsov Anatoly Pavlovich, with whom she had formed a friendship, worked in Grozny for more than 25 years as a TV journalist-cameraman. Polina's maternal grandmother was a professional artist. Paternal grandfather was an actor and musician. Polina's paternal grandmother was a professional actress.

On 25 March 1994, Polina started writing in a diary in which she recorded what was happening around her. Her diaries cover her childhood, adolescence and youth that witnessed three Chechen wars. School, first love, quarrels with parents, what is familiar to any teenager, side by side in the life of Polina with the bombing, starvation, devastation and poverty. On 21 October 1999 she was wounded by shrapnel during a missile attack on Grozny Central Market.

Since 2002, she has begun to work as a journalist. In 2003–2004, she studied at the School of Correspondents.

In 2004, Chechen diary was completed when the author was 19 years old.

In 2006, she has been awarded the Janusz Korczak international prize in Jerusalem in two categories (narrative and documentary prose). Competition theme was "terror and children."

Since 2007, she has been a member of the Russian Union of Journalists.

In 2010, she graduated from the Stavropol North Caucasus University with a degree in General Psychology.

In 2011, "Polina Zherebtsova's Journal: Chechnya 1999–2002" was published.

Since 2012, she has been a member of PEN International.

In 2012, she was one of the nominees for the Andrei Sakharov Freedom Award; an award “For Journalism as an Act of Conscience”.

In 2013, she has received political asylum in Finland.

In 2014, "Ant in a Glass Jar" was published.

== First Chechen War ==
The first military campaign started in 1994. Polina began her first diary on 25 March 1994 at the age of nine. At the beginning of the war, Zherebtsova's grandfather, Anatoly, was killed by shells from airplanes. Zherebtsova made the first serious entries in her diary at this time. She kept the diary to herself, and wrote about humorous and sad moments in the lives of her neighbors and friends. Because of her Russian surname and national strife, Polina was subjected to repeated insults at school.

== Second Chechen War ==
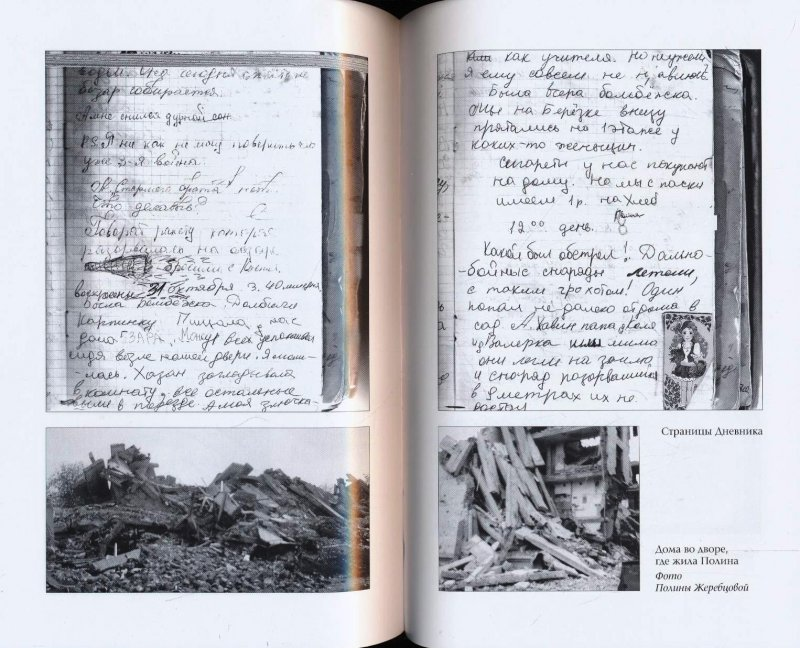
Diary of Polina Zherebtsova

In 1999 a new round of war in Grozny began in the North Caucasus, when Polina was 14 years old, which she describes in her diary.

While helping her mother trade in the central market in Grozny after high school, Polina was wounded in her leg on 21 October 1999, when the marketplace was shelled, as described in a preliminary report "The indiscriminate use of force by federal troops during the armed conflict in Chechnya in September–October 1999".

Due to injury and illness Polina and her mother didn't have time to escape from the war. She faced hunger and eviction along with other neighbors in the "cleansing", as described in pages of the diary. Her main goal was to make people understand the need to avoid war, especially in the same country. The diary also says that before the conflict began in 1994 in the Republic, the relationship between Russian and Chechen peoples was relatively friendly.

In February 2000, five months after her injury, 14-year-old Polina was operated on by surgeons of the 9th Moscow hospital, removing the biggest piece of shrapnel of the 16 pieces.

She had to change schools five times in the city, as all were destroyed in turn during the war in Chechnya. In 2002, 17-year-old Polina entered ChPGI (Chechen State Pedagogical Institute). In 2004 she graduated from the school of reporters with honors.

Since 2003, she had worked as a staff member for the newspaper.

In 2005, Polina moved to Stavropol. In Stavropol she transferred to the North Caucasus State Technical University, where she obtained her diploma for General Psychology in 2010.

In 2006, Polina was the winner of the international literary contest named after Janusz Korczak in two categories. In the same year, she wrote a letter to Alexander Solzhenitsyn, asking for help with the publication of her diaries. Staff members of Solzhenitsyn's foundation helped Polina move to Moscow, but failed to publish the diaries.

Polina continues to publish in the Moscow magazine Banner, the magazine Big City, and the newspaper Free Word.

In 2011, Polina published the book The Diary of Polina Zherebtsova, which is about Chechnya.

LiveLib.ru LiveLib has included the book "Ant in a glass jar. Chechen diaries of 1994–2004" in a list "The 100 best books of all time" based on rating and voting results.

Library "Bestseller" has awarded the book with the first place in the project "With a book to peace and harmony", dedicated to the presentation of books about wartime.

== Emigration ==
Because of threats which Polina reported she had begun to receive, by mail and phone from people representing themselves as "patriots of Russia", she left Russia in January 2012, taking political asylum in Finland.

Threats were constantly set in the fact that I must stop writing on this subject if I want to live and if I don't want to have my family killed. It's unbearable to live in constant fear. I'm very worried about my family. We were able to go, and we asked for political asylum...

In 2013 she was granted political asylum.

== Action ==
Polina signs petition "Putin must go".

She wrote a Letter to Khodorkovsky.

.......

I was very sympathetic to you when you were in prison. I considered the sentences you were given unjust, political. Even now I think that you may have been subjected to pressure. But you in your interview you said: “Putin is no weakling. I am ready to fight in order to keep the North Caucasus as part of our country. This is our land, we conquered and won it!” Consider: now you will have to share responsibility for those war crimes, which in the Caucasus are not the costs of “conquest”, but its essence.

Read my diary.

Read how we were conquered.

How we buried our murdered neighbours under fire, having first covered the graves with branches so that the hungry dogs would not tear the bodies apart. How thousands of women and children were murdered in the Chechen Republic.

Do you still want integration with such a Russia?

I do not.

And I do not need her citizenship. I am embarrassed by it, like the shameful brand-mark on a slave.

Polina Zherebtsova

23.12.2013

== Books ==
- 2011 — Polina Zherebtsova's Journal: Chechnya 1999-2002 Moscow, Detektiv-Press, ISBN 978-5-89935-101-3
- 2014 – Ant in a glass jar. Chechen diaries of 1994–2004 Moscow, Corpus, ISBN 978-5-17-083653-6
- 2015 – Thin Silver Thread (novels) Moscow, AST, ISBN 978-5-17-092586-5
- 2017 – Donkey Nature, (novel), Moscow, Time, ISBN 978-5-9691-1536-1
- 2017 – 45 parallel (novel), Ukraine ISBN 978-966-03-7925-1

=== Publication in foreign languages ===
- Polina Jerebtsova, Le journal de Polina Jerebtsova. Dédié aux dirigeants de la Russie d'aujourd'hui (translated into French by Véronique Patte). France, Paris: Books Editions., 2013. ISBN 2-36608-032-8.
- Polina Zherebtsova, Sodan sirpaleet. Finland, Helsinki: INTO, 2014. ISBN 978-952-264-312-4.
- Polina Zherebtsova, Le journal de Polina. France, Paris: 10/18, 2015. — 528 с. ISBN 978-226-406-455-4.
- Polina Zherebtsova, Чеченські щоденники 1994–2004. Ukraine:«Клуб сімейного дозвілля, 2015.ISBN 978-966-14-8343-8.
- Polina Scherebzowa, Polinas Tagebuch (translated into German by Olaf Kühl). — Berlin, Rowohlt Verlag, 2015, 576pp. ISBN 978-3-87134-799-3.
- Polina Žerebcova, Polinos dienoraštis (translated into Lithuanian by Indrė Butkutė). — Lithuania, Tytoalba, 2015, 415pp. ISBN 978-6-09466-107-5
- Polina Zherebtsova, Тонка сріблиста нить, Ukraine: BСЛ, 2016. ISBN 978-617-679-207-9
- Polina Žerebcovová, Deníky Poliny Žerebcovové - Děvčátko uprostřed čečenské války (translated into Czech by Libor Dvořák), Czech Republic, BizBooks, 2016, 479pp ISBN 978-80-265-0500-6
- Polina Zherebtsova, Осляче поріддя, Ukraine: BСЛ, 2017. ISBN 978-617-679-357-1
- Polina Zherebtsova, TŠETŠEENIA PÄEVIKUD 1994–2004, Estonia, Tänapäev, 2017. ISBN 978-994-985-161-4
- Polina Zherebtsova. 2017. Мравка в стъклен буркан: чеченски дневници 1994 - 2004 Mravka v stǎklen burkan: čečenski dnevnici 1994 - 2004 (translated into Bulgarian by Нели Пигулева Neli Piguleva). Ruse, Bulgaria: Avangard Print, 5988pp. ISBN 9789543373307
- Polina Żerebcowa. 2018. Mrówka w słoiku. Dzienniki czeczeńskie 1994-2004 (translated into Polish by Agnieszka Knyt). Warsaw: Ośrodek KARTA, 615pp. ISBN 9788364476914

== Novels and Stories ==
- Marriage of captivity – 2003
- The Dream about Passport – 2003
- Larissa – 2004
- Not fate – 2004
- Baptism – 2006
- Little Angel – 2006
- The Tale of Rabbit – 2007
- Grandfather Idris – 2008

and so on

== Literary Prizes ==
- Janusz Korczak International literary prize for fragment from the diary published as "Baptism" – 2006
- Janusz Korczak International literary prize military tale "Little Angel" – 2006
- Polina was an Andrei Sakharov Prize finalist "Journalism as an act of Conscience" in 2012
- Ernest Miller Hemingway International literary prize for book "Donkey breed" - 2017
- Finalist of the Angelus Award (Poland) "Chechen Diary" – 2019

== Reviews ==
"Agonizing Zherebtsova's storytelling already caused a comparison to her predecessors – Anne Frank, who kept a diary during the Second World War, and Zlata Filipovic, whose diary tells about the war in Bosnia. Publishers highly valued the diary, however, for a long time, one after another, they refused to print it, being "loyal to the government of modern Russia.-"

Alissa de Carbonne, "Reuters", United Kingdom.

Polina Zherebtsova was 14 when the bombs started raining down. They hit the market where she worked with her mother, the streets she walked down daily, until Grozny was reduced to rubble, a hometown no longer recognisable. From the start, Zherebtsova wrote about it, an act of catharsis as much as a document on the second Chechnya war. She filled dozens of diaries in a messy, scribbled cursive, sometimes embellished with doodles – bomb blasts that look like flowers, blocks of flats seen from a distance.

Miriam Elder, journalist, correspondent of The Guardian

The girl born in 1985 in the Soviet Union, sees herself not Russian or Chechen, but a citizen of the world. Her homeland is on the pages of books, written in Russian. But in war-torn Grozny, the word "Russian" is a stigma. Russians are "guilty" of everything around, although they themselves are a suffering party. Because of the Russian name girl is beaten by peers at school in each of the five schools that she had a chance to study in. Over the years, Polina learned to fight to defend her dignity. In the book, a lot of the episodes show that courage and perseverance inspire respect, but cowards do not survive. Enemies are always challenging and eyeing for how the victim will behave: break or hold out. In Russia, where the mother and daughter Zherebtsova get at the end of the book, they are considered "Chechen women", and they are again disenfranchised outcasts. Polina has repeatedly reiterated that she is a person of the world as her lineage intertwined many bloodlines. The concept of "personality" for her means more than "a representative of some nation", and “cultural identity” more than “national."

Alice Orlova, Miloserdie.ru

These sheets from children's notebook are valuable: as evidence of surprising strength of the terrible events of the previous days, as the story of a person that existed inside a history textbook, as a document depicting the ruthless picture by a ruthless eye of a child, as a miraculously survived note of a contemporary. But it is also an extremely talented and thoughtful narration, in which are intertwined stories of growing up, love and death. You can say that this is: "a document of the era", "adventure novel","war prose", a "drama of growing up", "a love saga" ... But all these definitions are not accurate, these pages are about: the value of individual human life above any geopolitical considerations, national differences and global concepts, and the love and the will to live is stronger than a call of blood and explosions of shells.

Philip Dzyadko, editor of "Big City" magazine.

The case of the war diaries is exceptional because among confusion in the news, reticence, and many conflicting assessments, just observations of ordinary people, who by the will of fate have become hostages of the war, can give an accurate picture of what is happening. One example of such literature now is the Chechen diary of Polina, the issue of which was a notable event. The book is a real diary that Grozny's resident Polina Zherebtsova kept as a teenager in 1999–2002, at the height of the second Chechen war. Some fragments of the diary were published earlier (in particular, for those Polina won a literary prize in Jerusalem named after Janusz Korczak in 2006), but to publish the entire book she managed not at once since no publishing house take the responsibility to publish "the truth about Chechnya".

Lydia Chesed, a critic. “Location – the war.”, magazines.russ.ru

This book can be quoted from any place and in any order. And everything will be an endless terror. Perhaps you can rashly decide that reading is the only way to get people to reject war forever. Polina kept Chechen diaries from 1994 to 2004: 10 years of fire, death, hunger, cold, diseases, humiliations, lies, betrayals, sadism – all, that together is denoted by four letters: "hell."

Igor Zotov, www.kultpro.ru

Chechen diaries of Polina Zherebtsova are real documents of the era, without any quotes and winks, without the embarrassment for the lack of soft language, which is fully justified by the events that served as material for the diaries. The real document of the era, which also has real artistic value. So it is definitely worth reading.

Elena Makeyenko, Siburbia.ru, “Diary as a way to survive”

Diary of Polina Zherebtsova is valuable by the fact that it upsets the balance of the roles and calls for the voices of other characters: girls, women, old women, waiting for the death from young, strong Russian men in military uniforms. Polina called them "Germans" or "white" because how can she, born at the turn of the Soviet Union and growing up with the Soviet films, name enemies any different? Russians as "Germans", shooting in poor or old women or cackling over the girl who skedaddle from them on all fours – these paintings are not so easy to accept even for the most liberal and unblinkered consciousness, but it makes the effort of every reader to open "Diary" even more valuable.

Elena Rybakova, the correspondent of "Moscow News"

I read the diaries of Polina Zherebtsova in small portions, they simply cannot be read in bulk. And I am thinking about the following ... It was also very difficult for us to live in the mid-nineties. Well, or so it seemed to us ... Then one side demanded an immediate end to the war and the recognition of independence, while other side – fighting to the bitter end. But what about those who have been there, in Chechnya, between the carpet bombing and sweeps from one side and stoned fanatics on the other – those were rarely remembered by both sides. People were expendable. Let's not call it the flowering of freedoms and human rights. Yes, we were beginning to travel abroad, to discover the world, to read a free press, to earn money. And beside us, in our country, people lived like that. Do you think this all could pass without consequences? For free? It seems that today a little more is talked about those who are now surviving and dying in the Donbass. A little more. But this will repeat itself over and over, I'm afraid, as long as we as a society, as a nation, as a country do not learn a simple truth: the defenceless people come first and foremost.

Andrew S Desnitsky, Russian Bible scholar, translator, essayist and writer. Doctor of Philology.

Polina Zherebtsova with her moral stance is much more convincing as a symbol of resistance to the fascist regime than Khodorkovsky and Navalny.

Andrei Piontkovsky

== External links and sources ==
- Review of Irena Brežná’s “She-Wolves from Sernovodsk: Notes from the Russo-Chechen War” and Polina Zherebtsova’s “Ant in a Glass Jar: Chechen Diaries, 1994–2004”
- ZAINA (woman in Chechnya). Author Polina Zherebtsova
- Ant in a Glass Jar Chechen Diaries 1994–2004 Fragment
- Polina Zherebtsova's Diary of the Chechen War
- Polina Zherebtsova's diary of the second Chechnya war
- Polina Zherebtsova on the diary she kept as a child during the Chechen war. ВВС on YouTube
- Polina : ses 14 ans sous les bombes
- Rencontre avec Polina Jerebtsova on YouTube
- Le journal de Polina on YouTube
- Polina Jerebtsova – Le journal de Polina, une adolescence tchétchène on YouTube
- "Le journal de Polina" de Polina Jerebtsova
- Author of a book about Chechnya seeks asylum in Finland
- The Guardian
- Polina Zherebtsova’s Diary of the Chechen War
- Polina's Livejournal
- reuters.com
- Dnevnik Poline Žerebcove
