= Hanna Krall =

Polish writer

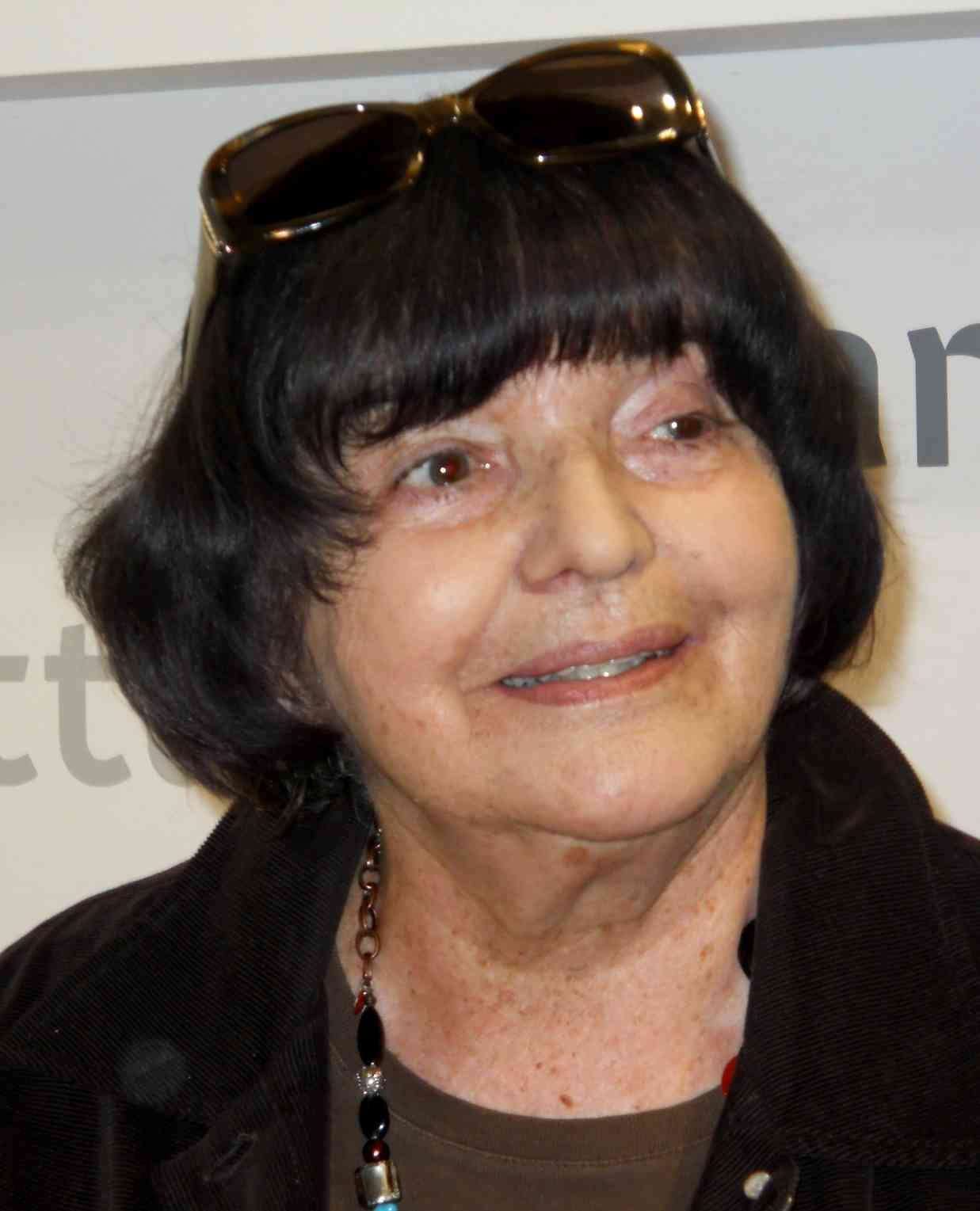
- Krall in 2011
- Born: 20 May 1935 (age 91); Warsaw, Poland
- Occupations: Novelist, journalist
- Writing career
- Notable awards: Herder Prize, 2005

Hanna Krall (born 20 May 1935) is a Polish writer with a degree in journalism from the University of Warsaw, specializing among other subjects in the history of the Holocaust in occupied Poland.

== Personal life ==
Krall is of Jewish origin, the daughter of Salomon Krall and Felicia Jadwiga née Reichold. She was born in Warsaw, Poland, but her date of birth is contested between 20 May 1935 and 20 May 1937. She was four (or two) years old, living in Lublin, when World War II began with the Nazi German invasion of Poland. Krall lost most of her close relatives in the Holocaust, including her mother and father, who were murdered in Majdanek. She survived deportations to death camps only because she was hidden from the Germans by the Polish rescuers. After the war, she stayed in orphanage home in Otwock until going to the University of Warsaw for her education from 1951 to 1955.

She is married to reporter Jerzy Szperkowicz and together have one daughter, Katarzyna.

== Career ==
=== Journalism ===
After Krall finished her studies in journalism, she started working for the Polish local paper Życie Warszawy ("Warsaw Life") from 1955 to 1966. She debuted her first article in 1966, she left the paper and began to write for the well known magazine Polityka ("Politics"). In 1981, Wojciech Jaruzelski, then Prime Minister of the former People's Republic of Poland, declared martial law, Krall was forced to leave Polityka. Afterwards, she worked as a freelance writer for the rest of the decade, writing articles for the Catholic newsletter Tygodnik Powszechny. In the early 90s, after the fall of Communism, she started writing articles for the Gazeta Wyborcza, under Adam Michnik.

=== Books ===
During Krall's time working for Polityka, she published her first book named Na wschód od Arbatu ("Heading east from Arbat") in 1972, written after she spent several years as a correspondent in Moscow. The book depicted day-to-day life in Moscow during the 1960s.

Commercial success came with the publication of the 1977 Zdążyć przed Panem Bogiem (engl. title: Shielding the Flame). The book is based on an interview with a Polish Jewish cardiologist and social activist, Marek Edelman, who was one of the founders of Żydowska Organizacja Bojowa (Jewish Combat Organization) and who took over its leadership after the head-commander Mordechai Anielewicz had perished. 'Shielding the Flame can be seen as a model for most of Krall's works. Krall describes the relations between Jews, Poles and Germans during the Holocaust and the years thereafter.

Her most famous success Król kier znów na wylocie ("Chasing the King of Hearts") has been translated into 17 languages an earned many awards since its publication in 2006, including the German Würth Preis for European Literature 2012 and the Found in Translation Award 2014.

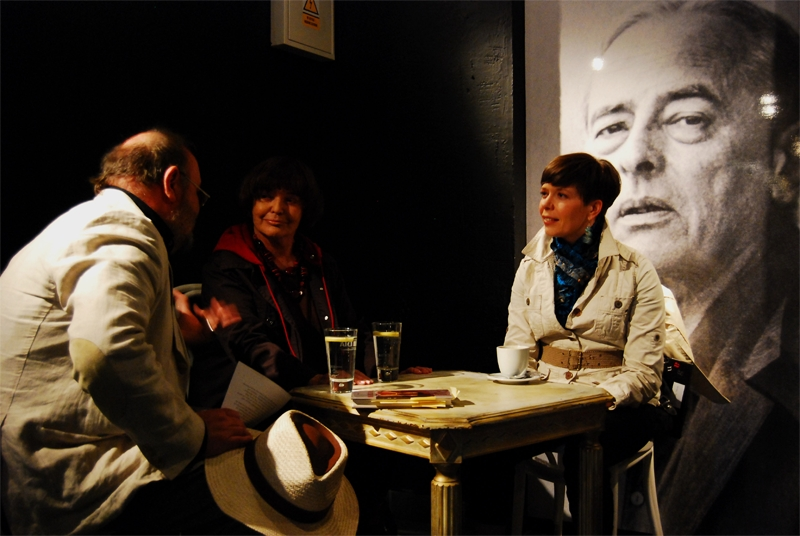
Pawel Huelle, Hanna Krall and Dorota Nowak discussion at the Literaturomania in Gdańsk, 2009

Apart from the central Holocaust theme, Krall's writings also reflect her search for her own identity, as can be seen very clearly in Dowody na istnienie ("Evidence for Existence"). Another theme in this book is the often complicated destiny of the Polish people in history and the influence of the past on people's lives in the present. Krall was a friend of Krzysztof Kieślowski and Krzysztof Piesiewicz, and inspired Decalogue Number 8 in the series of films made by these two men.

Her publication Widok z okna na pierwszym piętrze (engl. title: View from the Window on the First Floor) was a collaboration for the film Krótki Dzień Pracy (1981) by Kieślowski.

Her works have been translated into many languages and have received the most recognition in Germany and Sweden. The Belarusian 2015 Nobel Laureate Svetlana Alexievich described Krall as a key influence. Krall was a member of the Polish Writer's Union (Polish: Związek Literatów Polskich, ZLP) from 1978 to 1983 and the Stowarzyszenie Pisarzy Polskich (Polish Writer's Association) from 1989 to 2020.

List of Publications
Polish Title	English title	Year/ City of Publication
Gra o moje życie	My Life at Stake	Warsaw, Polityka, 1968
Na Wschód od Arbatu	Heading East from Arbat	Warsaw, 1972
Dojrzałość dostępna dla wszystkich	Maturity Available for Everyone	Warsaw, 1977
Zdążyć przed Panem Bogiem	Shielding the Flame	Kraków, 1977
Sześć odcieni bieli	Six Shades of White	Warsaw, 1978
Subloklatorka	The Subtenant	Paris, 1985
Hipnoza	Hypnosis	Warsaw, 1989
Trudności ze wstawaniem. Okna.	Problems with Getting Up. Windows.	Warsaw, 1990
Taniec na cudzym weselu	Dancing at Someone Else’s Wedding	Warsaw, 1993
Co się stało z naszą bajką	What Happened to Our Fairy Tale	Warsaw, 1994
Dowody na istnienie	Evidence for Existence	Poznań, 1996
Tam już nie ma żadnej rzeki	There Is No River There Anymore	Kraków, 1998
To ty jesteś Daniel	So You are Daniel	Kraków, 2001
Wyjątkowo długa linia	An Exceptionally Long Line	Kraków, 2004
Spokojne niedzielne popołudnie	A Quiet Sunday Afternoon	Kraków, 2004
Król kier znów na wylocie	Chasing the King of Hearts	Warsaw, 2006
Żal	Regret	Warsaw, 2007
Różowe strusie pióra	Pink Ostrich Feathers	Warsaw, 2009
Biała Maria	White Maria	Warsaw, 2011
Sześć odcieni bieli i inne historie	Six Shades of White and Other Stories	Warsaw, 2015

==== Books in English translation ====
- Shielding the flame : an intimate conversation with Marek Edelman, the last surviving leader of the Warsaw ghetto uprising
- The subtenant / To outwit God (1992). Includes Shielding the Flame titled as To Outwit God.
- To steal a march on God (1996). Dramatization of Shielding the Flame.
- The woman from Hamburg and other true stories (2006). Includes Taniec na cudzym weselu (Dancing at Someone Else's Wedding) and Dowody na istnienie (Proofs of Existence).
- Chasing the King of Hearts (2013)

== Awards ==
Krall has been the recipient of many prestigious awards in Poland and across the world including the Solidarity Cultural Prize (1985), Herder Prize (2005) for her work of autobiographical fiction, Sublokatorka (The Subtenant), the Journalist Laurels of the Polish Journalists' Association (2009), the Gold Medal for Merit to Culture – Gloria Artis (2014), the Julian Tuwim Literary Award (2014), and the Władysław Reymont Literary Prize (2009). She was also nominated for the Nike Literary Award for Tam już nie ma żadnej rzeki (1998) and Wyjątkowo długa linia (2004) and the Angelus Central European Literary Award for Król kier znów na wylocie (2007).

== Notes ==
- Polish Bibliography 1988 - 2001
