= Józef Hen =

Polish writer, screenwriter, and dramaturge (born 1923)

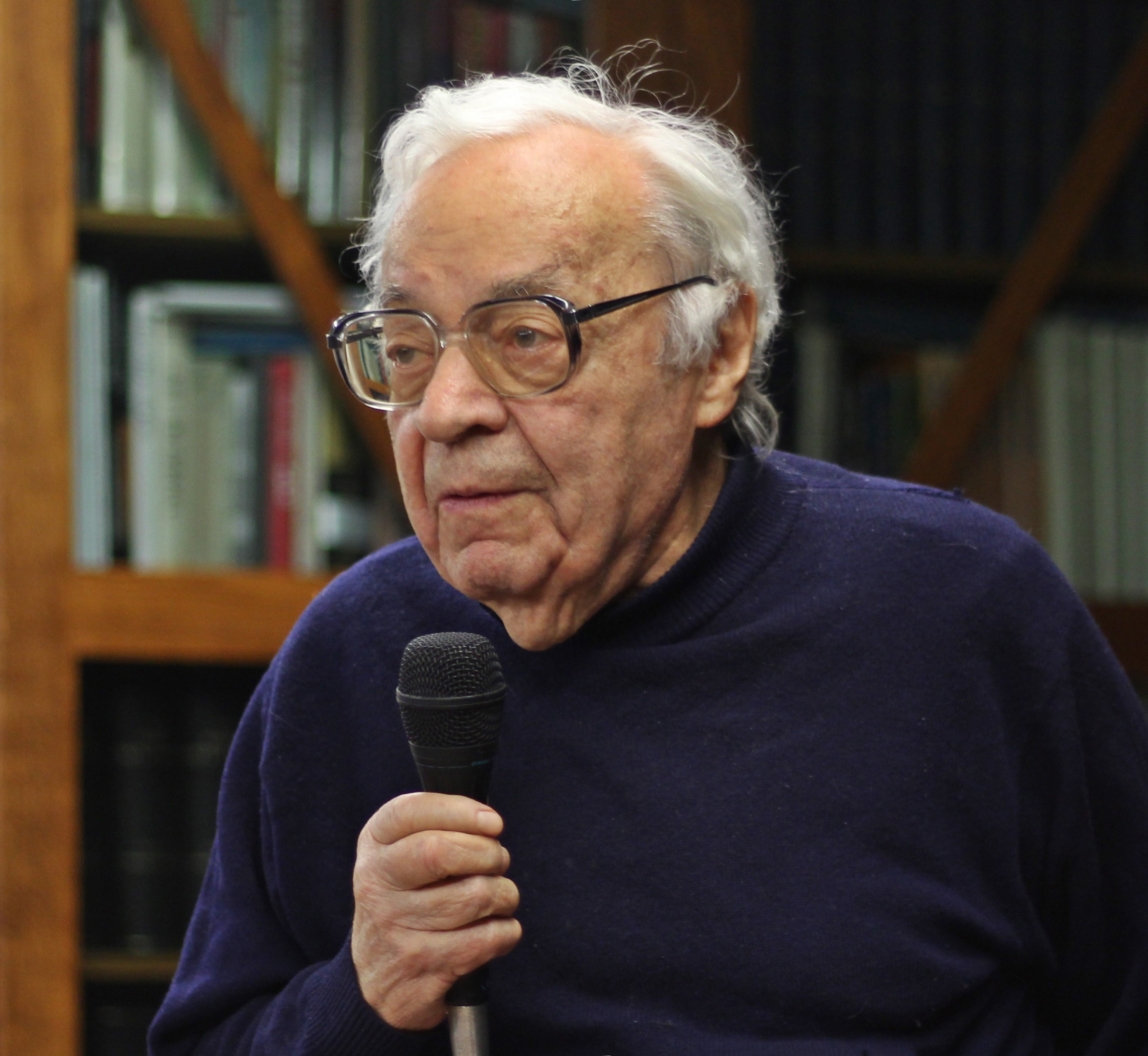
- Hen in 2014
- Born: Józef Henryk Cukier; 8 November 1923 (age 102); Warsaw, Poland
- Occupations: Author; playwright; screenwriter

Józef Hen (born Józef Henryk Cukier on 8 November 1923), is a Polish novelist, essayist, playwright, screenwriter, and reporter of Jewish origin.

== Biography ==
=== Early life ===
Cukier was born on 8 November 1923 in Warsaw. As a child he contributed to The Little Review, a Friday supplement to an adult daily, written entirely by children and founded by the educator Janusz Korczak.

After the German invasion of Poland in September 1939, he remained in Warsaw but fled the capital in November to escape the occupation. He spent the war in the Soviet Union. Despite his good health, he was not accepted into the Anders' Army in exile. In 1944, Cukier joined the rival Polish People's Army in exile and also published his poem "Łódź Wierna" (Faithful Łódź) in the magazine Voice of the Soldier.

During the war, Cukier lost his father, who was killed in 1945 in Buchenwald. His brother, Moses, disappeared in the Soviet Union, and his sister Mirka died in 1942. His mother and sister Stella survived the war. In 1944, Cukier adopted the pen name "Hen", which in time began to serve as his legal name. Immediately after the war, he worked as editor of the weekly Polish Soldier.

=== Career ===
In 1947, Hen published his first book, Kiev, Tashkent, Berlin, an autobiographical tale of his travels. He subsequently worked as a reporter and wrote short stories, historical fiction, and novels for adults and adolescents. He also wrote screenplays for films that he sometimes directed, including Buses Like Turtles. Some of his works were made into films in the 1960s, including The Cross of Valour, No One Is Calling, April, and Law and the Fist. He also wrote the script for the film An Ancient Tale: When the Sun Was a God and the historical series Royal Dreams, which he later published in book form.

In 1967–69, Hen was attacked in print by a group called the "Partisans". At that time, he began a collaboration with Kultura, a Polish journal in exile. It published three of Hen's stories under the pen name Korab—"Western", "Dayan's Eye", "The Twin").

Some of Hen's writings include the children's novel The Battle of Goat Court (1955); the war novel April (1960); the short story collection The Cross of Valour (1964); the historical novel The Crime, a Folk Tale (1975); two autobiographical novels, Before the Great Pause and Resistance, which document his childhood before World War II and during the siege of Warsaw in 1939; a volume of essays titled I Fear Not Sleepless Nights (1987); and the memoir Nowolipie Street (1991).

He also wrote belletristic biographies, among them I, Michel de Montaigne (1978); The Clown, a Great Man (1998), a comprehensive sketch of the character and activities of Tadeusz Boy-Zelenski; and My Friend the King (2003), about Stanisław August Poniatowski.

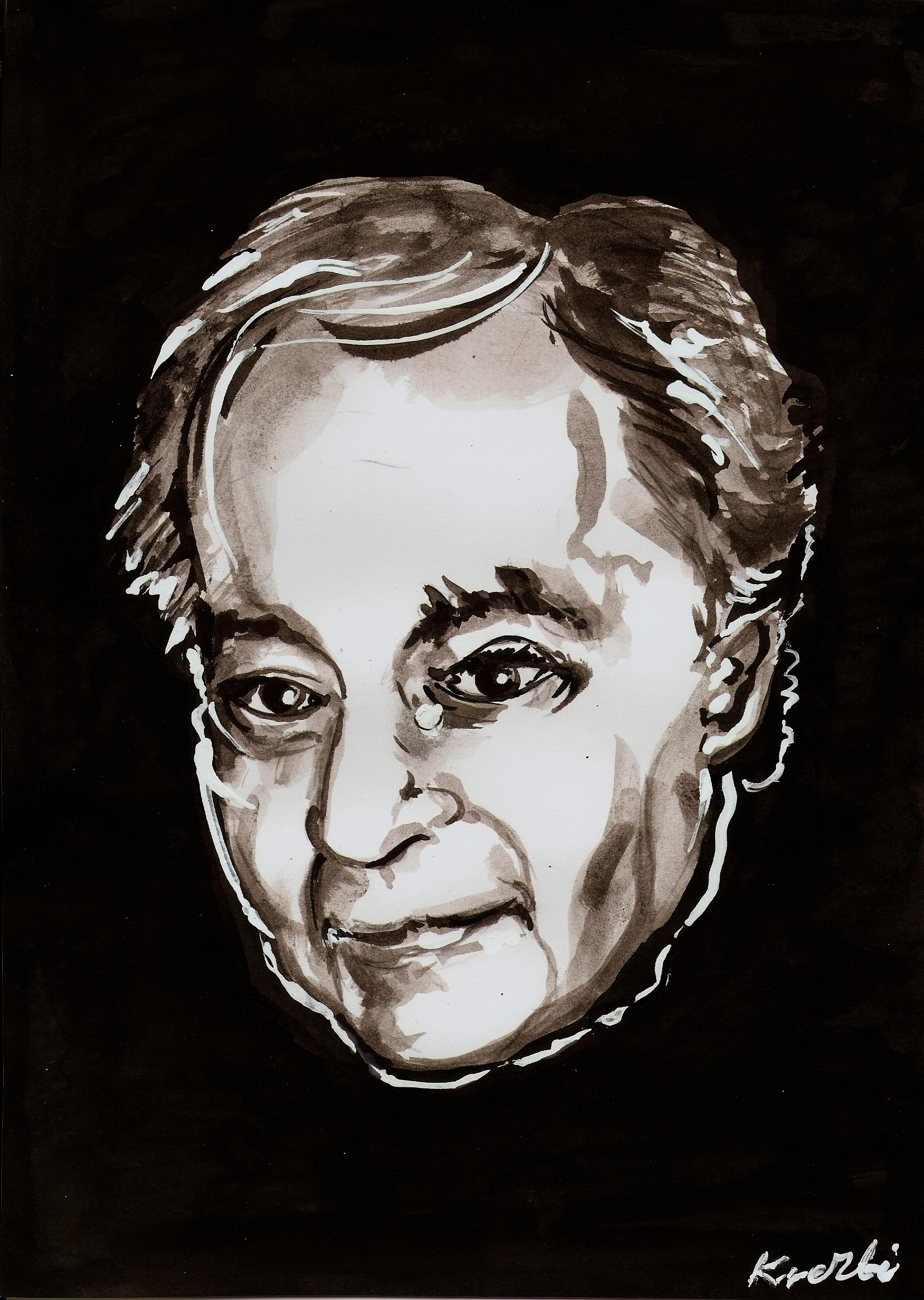
Portrait of Józef Hen by Zbigniew Kresowaty

=== Personal life ===
Hen lives in Warsaw. From his marriage to Irene (née Lebewal) (1922–2010), he has two children: Magdalena (b. 1950) and writer Maciej Hen (b. 1955).

He was awarded the Cross of Valour and the Commander's Cross with Star of the Order of Polonia Restituta (1998).

In 2009, he received the City of Warsaw Literary Award for his works.

== Selected works ==
- The Battle of Goat Court, 1955
- Kiev, Tashkent, Berlin, Wydawnictwo MON, 1958
- Kwiecień, Czytelnik, 1961
- The Cross of Valour, 1964
- Mist, PIW, 1970
- The Crime, a Folk Tale, 1975
- I, Michel de Montaigne, 1978
- Theatre of Herod: Before the Great Pause; Resistance, Czytelnik, 1982 ISBN 83-07-00501-9
- I Fear Not Sleepless Nights, Czytelnik, 1987, ISBN 83-07-01350-X
- No One Is Calling, Wyd. Literackie, 1990, ISBN 83-08-02201-4
- Nowolipie Street, Prospero, Łódź, 1991, ISBN 83-900822-0-9, (English translation, DL Books LLC 2012, ISBN 978-0-9851045-0-4)
- Departure of Aphrodite, Twój styl, 1995
- The Clown, a Great Man, Wydawnictwo Iskry, 1998, ISBN 83-207-1611-X
- I, Michel de Montaigne ..., Prószynski i S-ka, 1999, ISBN 83-7180-341-9
- April, Nowe Wydawnictwo Polskie Ypsylon, Warsaw 2000
- My Friend the King, Wydawnictwo Iskry, 2003, ISBN 83-207-1739-6
- The Silent Among Us, Jeden Świat, 2004, ISBN 978-8389632128
- Professor T's Notebooks, PIW 2006, ISBN 83-06-03006-0
- The Law and the Fist, Świat Literacki, 2006, ISBN 978-83-86646-17-3
- The Ping-Pong Player, W.A.B. 2008, ISBN 978-83-7414-426-1
- Journal for the New Century, W.A.B. 2009, ISBN 978-83-7414-706-4
- The Sixth, the Youngest and Other Stories, W.A.B. 2012, ISBN 978-83-7747-639-0
- Powrót do bezsennych nocy. Dzienniki, Sonia Draga, Katowice 2016, ISBN 978-83-7999-740-4
