= Maciej Hen =

Polish writer, translator, and journalist (b. 1955)

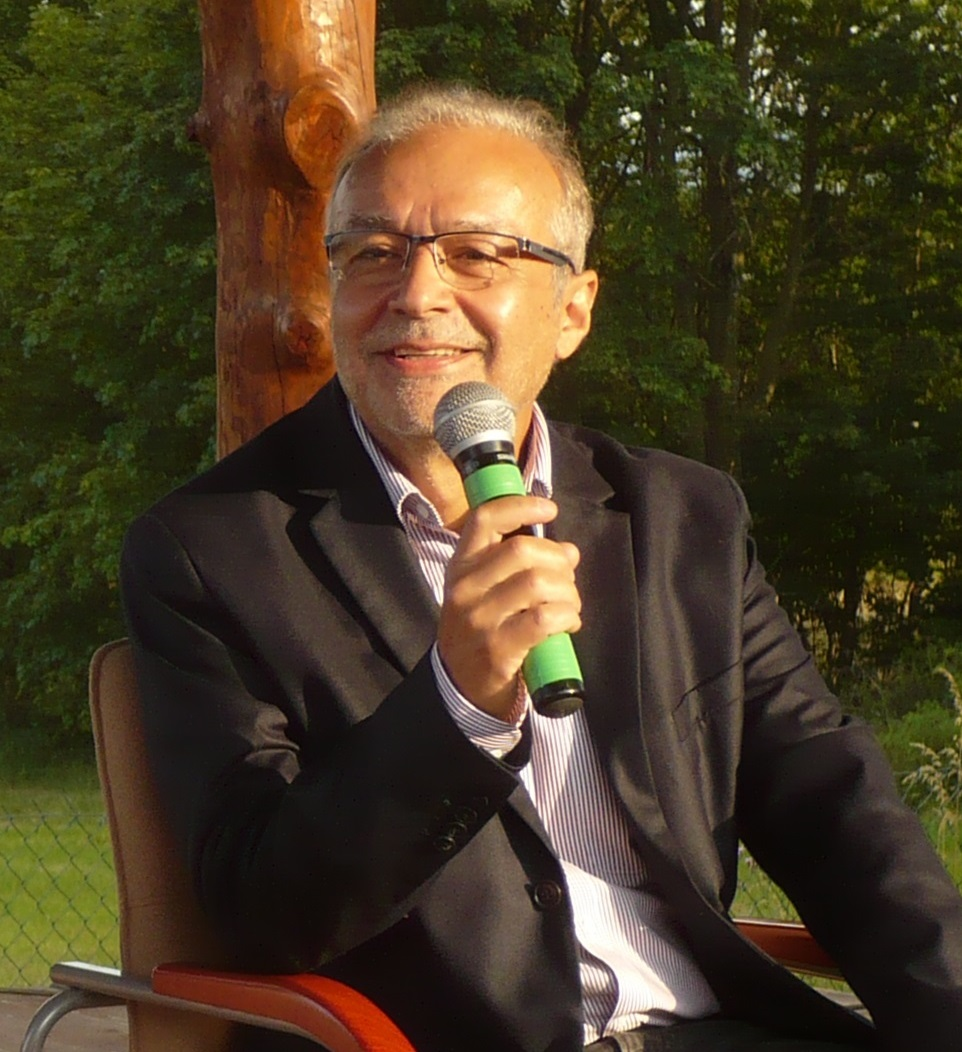
- Born: 13 June 1955 (age 71); Warsaw, Poland
- Occupation: Writer

Maciej Hen (born 13 June 1955 in Warsaw) is a Polish writer, translator and journalist.

== Life ==
Maciej Hen is a son of a Polish writer Józef Hen and the late pedagogue and Russian teacher Irena Lebewal from Navariya near Lvov. Both of his parents are of Jewish origin. He attended (but in 1974 left just before the final examination) The National Art High School in Warsaw and in 1979 he completed his studies at the cinematography department of the National Film School in Łódź. On various occasions he worked as a camera operator, a director of photography and a director of documentary films, a still photographer and a photojournalist, a screenwriter, an actor, a journalist, a musician, an English translator and a TV lighting designer. As a journalist he published articles among others in the newspaper Gazeta Wyborcza.

== Career ==
In 2004, under the pen name Maciej Nawariak, he published his first novel According to Her. In 2015 his second historical novel, Solfatara, appeared and next year it was awarded The Witold Gombrowicz Literary Prize and the title of Book of the Year of the Warsaw Premiere of Literature, as well as shortlisted for Angelus Award. In 2019, Hen's third novel, Deutsch for Intermediates, was published by Wydawnictwo Literackie.

== Awards ==
- 2025 shorlisted for the Visegrad Literary Award
- 2023 shortlisted for the EBRD Literature Prize
- 2016 The title of Book of the Year of the Warsaw Premiere of Literature
- 2016 The Witold Gombrowicz Literary Prize
- 2016 shortlisted for The Angelus Award
- 2016 shortlisted for The Norwid Award

== Books ==
- Tratwa z pomarańczami, (The Raft of Oranges). Warsaw: Wydawnictwo Filtry, 2025. ISBN 978-83-68180-61-9
- Segretario, Krakow: Wydawnictwo Literackie 2023.ISBN 978-8308080559
- According to Her, Holland House Books, trans. by Anna Blasiak, ISBN 9781910688663

(Polish edition Według niej. Warsaw: Wydawnictwo Due. 2004 ISBN 83-920561-0-8. Under the pen name Maciej Nawariak)

- Solfatara. Warsaw: Wydawnictwo W.A.B. 2015 ISBN 978-8328020818
- Deutsch dla średnio zaawansowanych (Deutsch for Intermediates). Krakow: Wydawnictwo Literackie. 2018 ISBN 978-8308068786
- Beatlesi w Polsce (The Beatles in Poland). Warsaw: Wydawnictwo Agora 2021. ISBN 978-83-268-3670-1

== Filmography ==
- 1962: Jadą goście jadą [Guests are coming'] – actor
- 1968: Dzieci z naszej szkoły – actor
- 1984: Rozalka Olaboga – in part camera operator
- 1986: Z nakazu serca i rozumu – director of photography
- 1991: Pogranicze w ogniu – actor
- 1998: Sprawa Martyniki – script
- 2006: Fotografie Mojego taty – director, director of photography and music composer
- 2008: Mata Hari znad Wisły – director, in part director of photography
- 2013: Zdjęcie od Nasierowskiej, czyli życie wielokrotnie spełnione – in part director of photography
- 2016: "Nie płacz kiedy odjadę" ‒ in part director of photography
