= Thin Silver Thread =

- Author: Polina Zherebtsova
- Language: Russian
- Subject: First Chechen War, Second Chechen War
- Genre: Novel
- Publisher: АСТ
- Publication date: 2015
- Publication place: Russia
- Pages: 320
- ISBN: 978-5-17-092586-5

Thin Silver Thread (ru. "Тонкая серебристая нить") is a 2015 collection of 33 stories by Polina Zherebtsova. It portrays the lives of civilians in Grozny during the Chechen wars. The collection was created between 2005 and 2015. These stories familiarize the reader with life during the wars and are an artistic reflection of what Zherebtsova saw and experienced in the Chechen Republic. The Sakharov Centre in Moscow hosted the book launch on November 13, 2015.

According to Fontanka.ru, the book was included in the "Top 10 Books of Autumn 2015".

== Style and genre ==
Documentary evidence is the basis in these. Critics stated that it achieves the goal of educating the next generation. The stories incorporate mysticism, unexplained phenomena and dream-travel.

Each story continues the previous one. The stories are woven into a single continuous text. The heroes wander from one story to another, just like their real life counterparts. The author stated that she did not change the names of those killed, in order to preserve their memory.

== Reviews ==
There is a change in the style of the text. Instead of existential testimony – smooth language, like from a sample of the Soviet children's prose. No one before Polina Zherebtsova wrote about the Chechen war this way; we have always seen some carnage and imminent violence that was filtered out by our brains. Thin Silver Thread is a children's noir nonfiction; we experience a subconscious fear from hair, sprouting through the grass on the site of the group burial in the garden, much more than from any reports by Andrei Babitsky.

Peter Silaev

Many parts of the texts are deliberately mystified, there are even parallel universes, and some of the action takes place in a dream. But in each of these texts the reader will see very strong emotions and a new attempt to understand what happened in Chechnya during the childhood of the author. Stories of Polina Zherebtsova are a strong adult prose. I want to add the phrase "based on real events" to each story published in A Thin Silver Thread.

Sergei Shpakovsky

The author is present in each story: as one of the heroes or as the narrator; she is not hiding under fictitious names and is not trying to pass off something as fiction that is not. This is a literature, which grew out of personal factual experiences; and is clear of the notorious writer's inventing, genre impurities and stylistic flourishes.

The war is described with childlike spontaneity and same childlike ruthlessness and high-grade creative writing. Despite the lightness of the style, the reading of this prose requires certain and considerable inner strength. The fact that the stories are short says a lot about the generosity of the author, who understands that the reader will need frequent breaks. If you remove the boundaries between texts – all of them will turn into a unified and cohesive impulse. This is exactly what distinguishes the real literature from its multifaceted twins.

Sergei Kumysh

== Publication ==
The story Little Angel won the Janusz Korczak international competition in Jerusalem in 2006.

Two more stories "Zayna" and '"Two meters squared"that were to be part of the collection were instead published in Moscow's magazine Medvedj in 2014.

== Characters ==
A girl named Polina.

Her mother is Elena.

Their neighbors during the war: Sultan, Maryam, Idris, Nina, Nastasia, Rumisa, Ramzan, Zayna, Fatima, Vera, Medina and others.
