= Ant in a Glass Jar =

Book by Polina Zjerebtsova

Ant in a Glass Jar: Chechen Diaries 1994–2004
- Author: Polina Zherebtsova
- Language: Russian
- Subject: First Chechen War, Second Chechen War
- Genre: Autobiography, diary
- Publisher: АСТ: CORPUS
- Publication date: 2014
- Publication place: Russia
- Pages: 608
- ISBN: 978-5-17-083653-6

Ant in a Glass Jar: Chechen Diaries 1994–2004 (Russian: "Муравей в стеклянной банке. Чеченские дневники 1994–2004" is a 2014 documentary book that is an author's diary about the years spent in Chechnya from 1994 until 2004. It was written by Polina Zherebtsova, while she was 9–19 years old.

In 2013, Polina has received a political asylum in Finland.

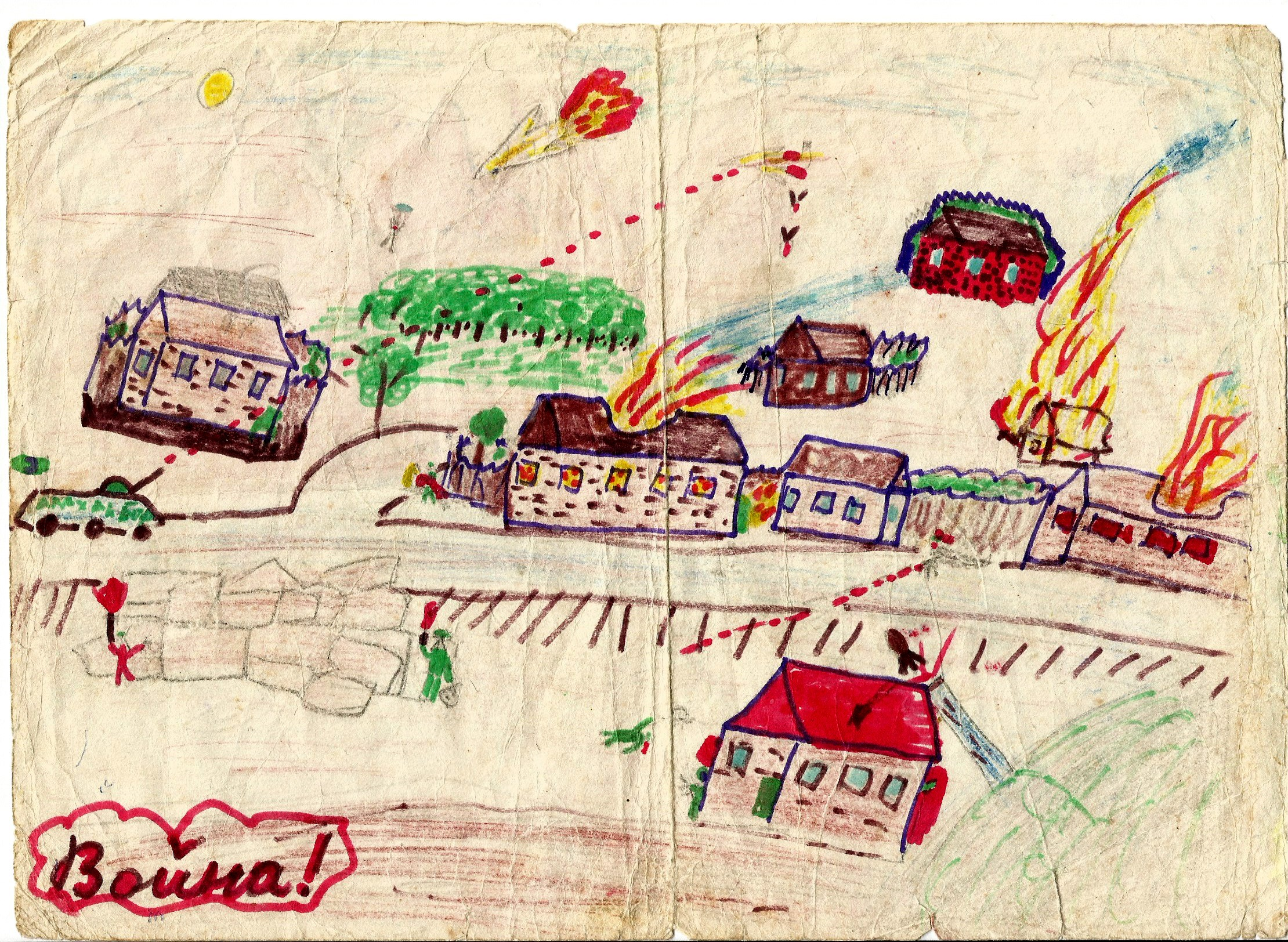
picture, 1995

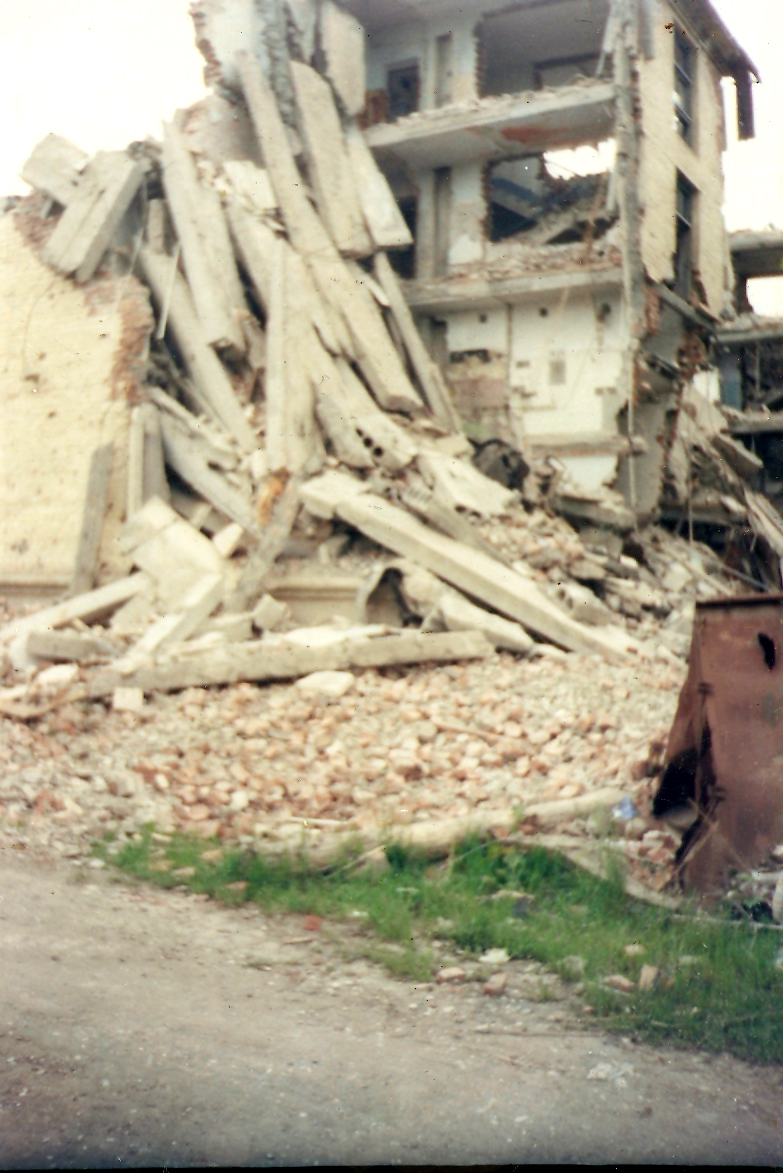
House

Presentation of the book took place in the center of the Andrei Sakharov 30.05.2014.

Politkovskaya described war as a journalist from the outside in. Polina Zherebtsova writes about war from inside the heart of darkness. Der Spiegel №10 /2015.

== Editorial history ==
This diary was edited by the author and it was published in spring 2014 by the Russian publishing house AST "Korpus", though as an abridged version because of the censorship policies in modern Russia.

The names of characters have been changed. The book tells about inter-ethnic relations of Russian and Chechen people and the lives of civilians during bloody Chechen wars. This book contains the following photographs and drawings made by Polina Zherebtsova in the years 1994–2004.

"I saw the actual writing, and I can confirm that this is a real diary of a real girl and not just some hoax" – said Svetlana Gannushkina, who is co-founder of the Civic Assistance Committee, committee member and head of the network "Migration and Law" of the Human Rights Centre "Memorial", to refute claims about inauthenticity of the published material at the book's presentation, according to Russian newspaper "Rossiyskaya Gazeta".

LiveLib.ru has put a book "Ant in a glass jar. Chechen Diaries 1994-2004" in the list "100 best books of all time" based on rating and voting results.

The library "Bestseller" has awarded the first place to the book in the project "With a book to peace and harmony", dedicated to the presentation of books about the war.

== Translations ==
The book has been translated into Ukrainian, French, Lithuanian, Finnish, German.

Fragments were published in Slovenian and English

Polina Zherebtsova has always offered publishing rights for translations of all of her books by herself, without the use of services of literary agents.

== Story ==
The story begins on 25 March 1994 in Chechnya's capital city Grozny, in Polina's Zherebtsova's multinational family, which was in the midst of heavy fighting during military actions. Just five days after turning nine, Polina started her first diary. Polina's ancestors are of different ethnicities: Russians, Chechens, Jews, Ukrainians and Tatars. The girl grows up very quickly while living under the bombing. She learns how to survive, rescue her mom and how to work. But even having a life under the bombs, she reads books, falls in love, makes friends and enemies. Polina describes in her diary what is happening around with the neighbours, army men, friends and enemies. In her house Torah, Bible and Quran are highly honoured. But she turns out to be outside religions and nationalities.

== Biography ==
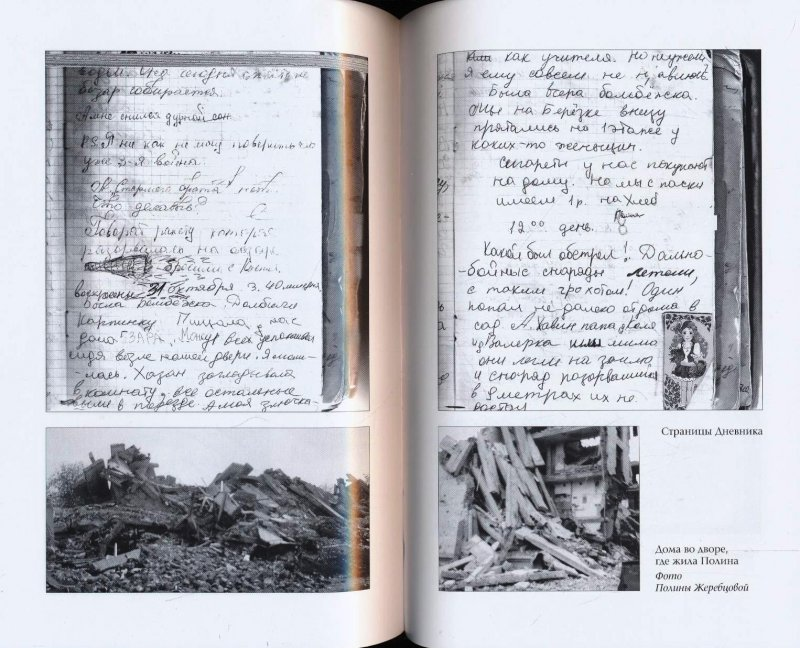
Diary of Polina Zherebtsova

Polina Zherebtsova, a documentarian, poet and author of the famous diaries, covering her childhood, adolescence and youth that witnessed three Chechen wars.

Since 2002, she has begun to work as a journalist. She is a member of PEN International and the Union of Journalists of Russia. She has been awarded the Janusz Korczak international prize in Jerusalem in two categories (narrative and documentary prose). In 2012, she was awarded The Andrei Sakharov Award "For Journalism as an Act of Conscience". Since 2013, she has been living in Finland.

Polina Zherebtsova was born in 1985 in Grozny and lived there for almost twenty years. She considers herself a cosmopolitan as she has multi-national ancestry. Polina’s father died when she was very young. Polina’s maternal grandfather Zherebtsov Anatoly Pavlovich, with whom she had formed a friendship, worked in Grozny for more than 25 years as a TV journalist-cameraman. Polina’s maternal grandmother was a professional artist. Paternal grandfather was an actor and musician. Polina’s paternal grandmother was a professional actress.

In 1994, Polina started keeping a diary in which she recorded what was happening around her. Her diaries cover her childhood, adolescence and youth that witnessed three Chechen wars. School, first love, quarrels with parents, what is familiar to any teenager, side by side in the life of Polina with the bombing, starvation, devastation and poverty.

On 21 October 1999 she was wounded by shrapnel during a missile attack on Grozny Central Market.

Since 2002, she has begun to work as a journalist. In 2003-2004, she studied at the School of Correspondents.

In 2004, Chechen diary was completed when the author was 19 years old.

In 2006, she has been awarded the Janusz Korczak international prize in Jerusalem in two categories (narrative and documentary prose). Competition theme was "terror and children."

Since 2007, she has been a member of the Russian Union of Journalists.

In 2010, she graduated from the Stavropol North Caucasus University with a degree in General Psychology.

In 2011, "Polina Zherebtsova's Journal: Chechnya 1999-2002" was published.

Since 2012, she has been a member of PEN International.

In 2012, she was awarded The Andrei Sakharov Award "For Journalism as an Act of Conscience".

In 2013, she has received a political asylum in Finland.

In 2014, "Ant in a Glass Jar" was published.

== Text ==
The year was 1995.

"I ran through the gardens, so I could reach the base. I was running alone. A sniper was shooting the railway. Bullets were falling nearby. I wanted to find my mother. I was running, calling for her. I saw murdered people, but my mother was not one of them, so I did not get close to them. Some aunts and children were lying on the snow. And, there was one grandmother with a grey scarf."

.

Ant in a glass jar. Chechen diaries of 1994–2004 is a more full edition of "The Diary of Polina Zherebtsova"

- In February 2015, Novaya Gazeta reported that the theater "Practice" refused to put the performance of the two Chechen wars because of the dangerous political situation in Russia.

== Reviews ==
"This is a terrific human document, translated into many European languages" – writes the Russian magazine "Medvedj".

"Agonizing Zherebtsova's storytelling already caused a comparison to her predecessors – Anne Frank, who kept a diary during the Second World War, and Zlata Filipovic, whose diary tells about the war in Bosnia. Publishers highly valued the diary, however, for a long time, one after another, they refused to print it, being "loyal to the government of modern Russia.-" Alissa de Carbonne, "Reuters", United Kingdom.

.

"When the word "death" from the books broke through the cardboard covers and got reunited with its sister that was swooping down on the city from the dirty sky, and it had overgrown with bones and settled in Grozny for a long time, Polina already had an antidote. Not only she survived, but also found the right words to tell the impossible." Bozhko Stanislav, writer and peacekeeper.

.

Has this book changed anything in my personal perception of the war in the Caucasus? Yes, I think so. It's not that I am politically illiterate person from a street. I can imagine what was the first and second Chechen wars, and what has been transformed into the city of Grozny. But when faced with the direct testimonies of a living person who was there, lived, fought for a piece of bread, this read, no doubt, changes your perspective.

Marina Davydova, theater critic, editor in chief of "Theatre" magazine

.

Polina Zherebtsova was 14 when the bombs started raining down. They hit the market where she worked with her mother, the streets she walked down daily, until Grozny was reduced to rubble, a hometown no longer recognisable. From the start, Zherebtsova wrote about it, an act of catharsis as much as a document on the second Chechnya war. She filled dozens of diaries in a messy, scribbled cursive, sometimes embellished with doodles – bomb blasts that look like flowers, blocks of flats seen from a distance.

Miriam Elder, journalist, correspondent of The Guardian

.

Diary of Polina Zherebtsova is valuable by the fact that it upsets the balance of the roles and calls for the voices of other characters: girls, women, old women, waiting for the death from young, strong Russian men in military uniforms. Polina called them "Germans" or "white" because how can she, born at the turn of the Soviet Union and growing up with the Soviet films, name enemies any different? Russians as "Germans", shooting in poor or old women or cackling over the girl who skedaddle from them on all fours - these paintings are not so easy to accept even for the most liberal and unblinkered consciousness, but it makes the effort of every reader to open "Diary" even more valuable.

Elena Rybakova, the correspondent of "Moscow News"

.

== Theatrical production ==
A scriptwriter of Moscow's theatre "Praktika" is willing to put on a play based on the book "Ant in a glass jar. Chechen diaries of 1994–2004." He spoke about this idea in one of his interviews. Also, negotiations are happening now in the U.S. about the book's release on the big screen.

== Publication of the diary ==
The Diary of Zherebtsova Polina from 1999 to 2002 was published by Detective Press in 2011. Shortened fragments of the diary from 1999 and 2000 were published in Russian and foreign media in 2006–2010. It has been partly translated into Georgian and Slovenian.

- Дневник Жеребцовой Полины Detektiv-Press, 2011, ISBN 978-5-89935-101-3
- "Ant in a glass jar. Chechen diaries of 1994-2004" Corpus, 2014. ISBN 978-5-17-083653-6

Publication in foreign languages

- Polina Zherebtsova, Le journal de Polina. France, Paris: Books Editions., 2013. ISBN 2-36608-032-8.
- Polina Zherebtsova, Sodan sirpaleet. Finland, Helsinki: INTO, 2014. ISBN 978-952-264-312-4.
- Polina Zherebtsova, LE JOURNAL DE POLINA. France, Paris: 10/18, 2015. ISBN 978-226-406-455-4.
- Polina Zherebtsova, Чеченські щоденники 1994-2004 рр. Ukraine:«Клуб сімейного дозвілля, 2015.ISBN 978-966-14-8343-8.
- Polina Zherebtsova, Polinas Tagebuch. Berlin, Rowohlt Verlag, 2015. ISBN 978-3-87134-799-3.
- Polina Zherebtsova, Polinos Dienorastis. Lithuania: Tytoalba, 2015. ISBN 978-6-09466-107-5.
- Polina Zherebtsova, BizBooks, 2016. Czech Republic ISBN 978-80-265-0500-6.

== See also ==
- 2014 in literature
