= Pavol Rankov =

Slovak writer (born 1964)

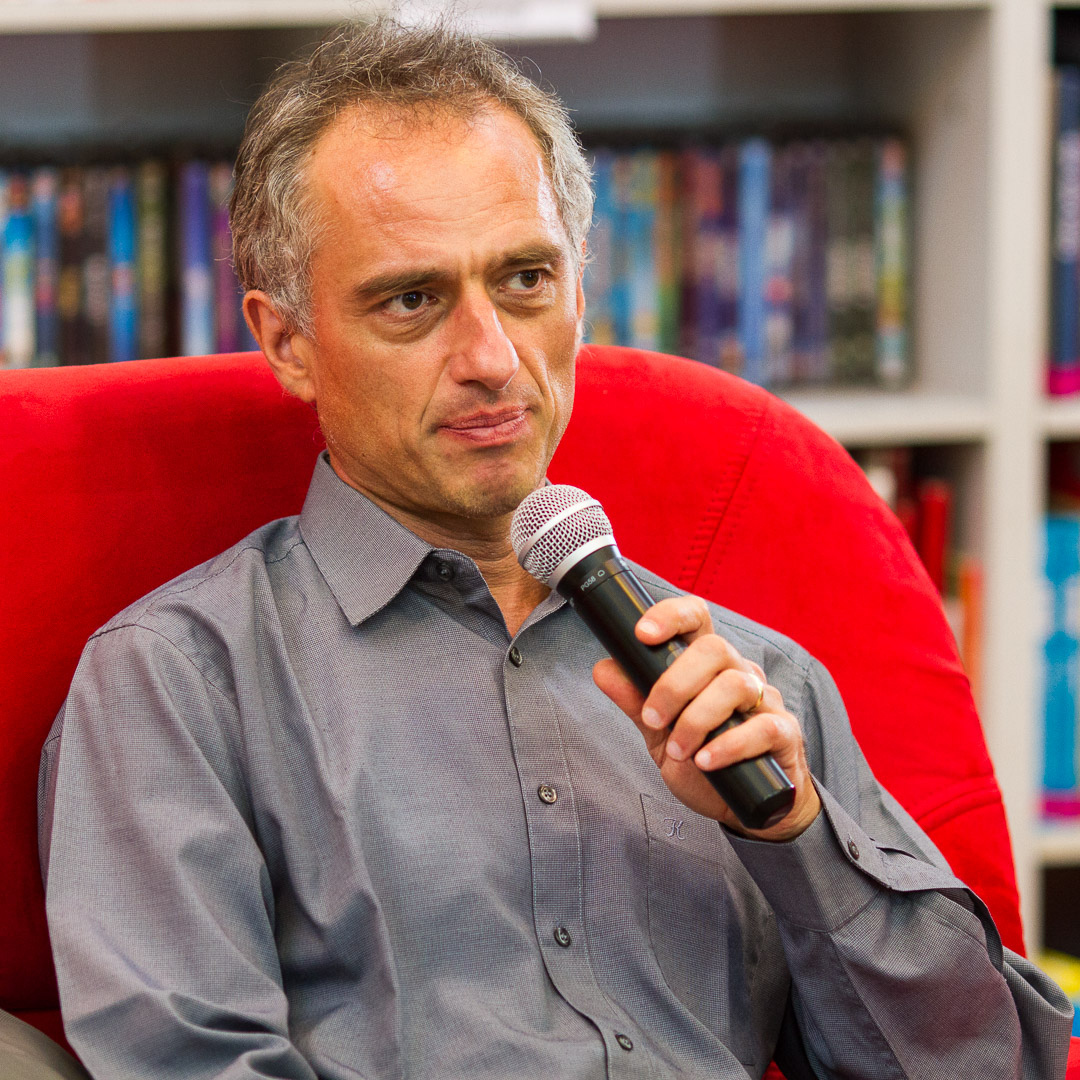
- Born: 16 September 1964 (age 61); Poprad, Czechoslovakia
- Occupation: Writer
- Writing career
- Language: Slovak

Pavol Rankov (born 16 September 1964) is a Slovak writer. Rankov was born in Poprad and went to school in Bratislava. He studied library science at the Comenius University, graduating in 1987. He then worked at the Slovak National Library in Martin and at the Slovak Pedagogic Library in Bratislava. In 1993, Rankov joined the staff of the Comenius University. He won the European Book Prize as well as the Angelus Award for his novel Stalo sa prvého septembra (alebo inokedy), translated into English as It Happened on September the First (or Whenever).

Rankov lives in Bratislava.

== Works ==
- S odstupom času (stories, 1995)
- My a oni / Oni a my (stories, 2001)
- V tesnej blízkosti (stories, 2004)
- Stalo sa prvého septembra (alebo inokedy) (novel, 2008)
- Matky (novel, 2011)
- Klinika (novel, 2022)
