= Filip Florian =

Romanian writer and journalist

Filip Florian (born May 16, 1968, in Bucharest) is a Romanian writer.

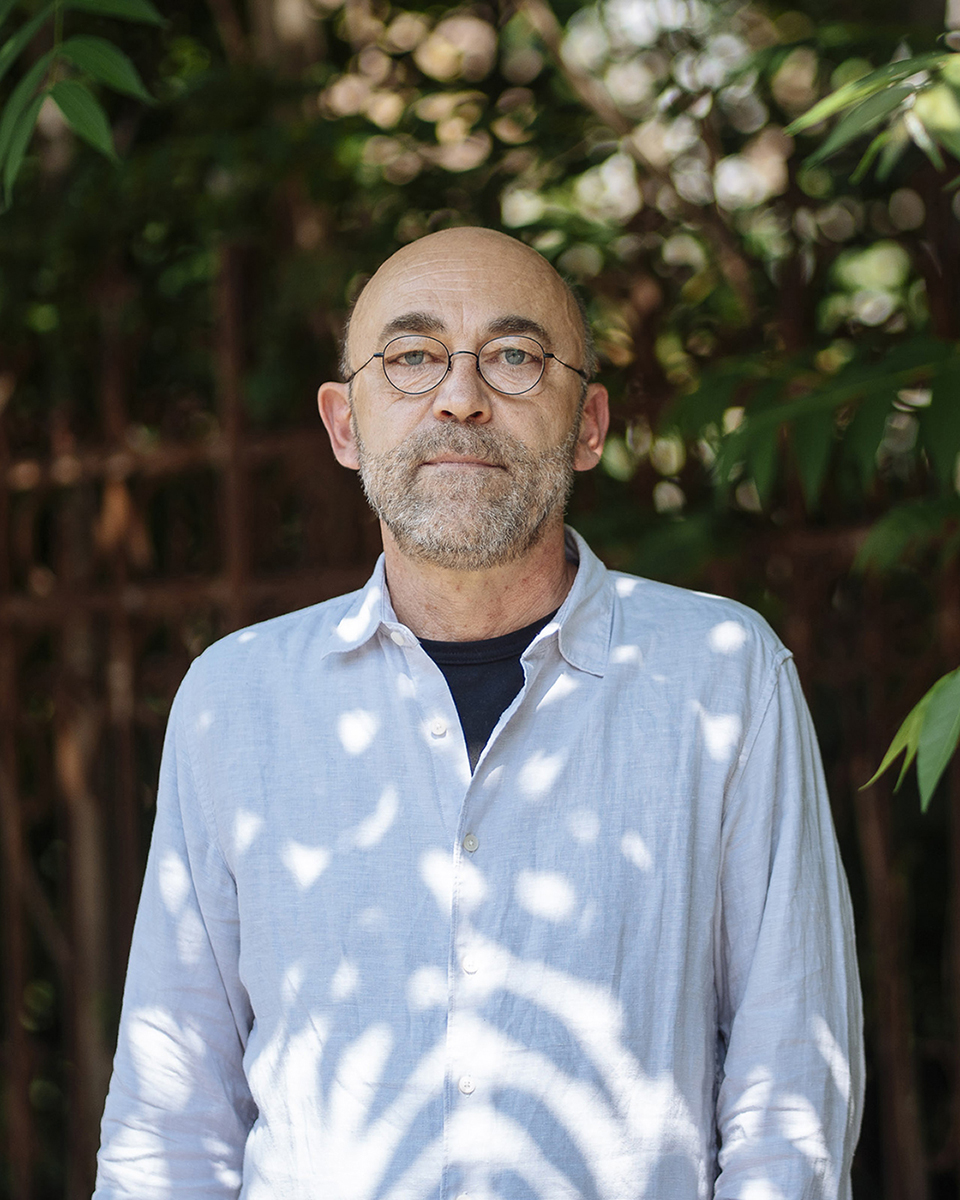
Filip Florian in 2026

== Biography ==
Filip Florian began his path as a journalist, working between 1990 and 1992 as an editor for Cuvîntul magazine and subsequently, until 1999, as a correspondent for Radio Free Europe and Deutsche Welle. He currently lives in Bucharest.

== Works ==
The novel Degete mici (Little Fingers) marked Florian's literary debut in 2005. It was awarded "best debut" by România Literară (Literary Romania), the excellence prize for debut of the National Union of the Romanian Patronate (Uniunea Națională a Patronatului Român) and the Romanian Writers' Union prize. The novel was translated and published in Hungary (Magvető), Germany (Suhrkamp), Poland (Czarne), Slovenia (Didakta), Italy (Fazi), Spain (Acantilado), Slovakia (Kalligram), Bulgaria (Ciela) and the United States (Houghton Mifflin Harcourt). Zilele Regelui (The Days of the King) published in 2008 was awarded the "Manuscriptum prize" by the National Museum of Romanian Literature; furthermore, the novel was named "book of the year" at the Contemporary Romanian Novel Symposium. The Days of the King was translated into Hungarian, Bulgarian, Polish and English; a Spanish edition is to be published by Acantilado. In 2026, Florian published Media aritmetică, a novel set in late-1940s Bucharest.

== Publications ==
- Degete mici (Little Fingers) - 2005, 2007
- Băiuțeii (The Baiut Alley Lads) - 2006
- Zilele regelui (The Days of the King) - 2008
- Toate bufnițele (All the Owls) - 2012
- Media aritmetică - 2026
