= Yevhenia Kuznietsova =

Ukrainian author

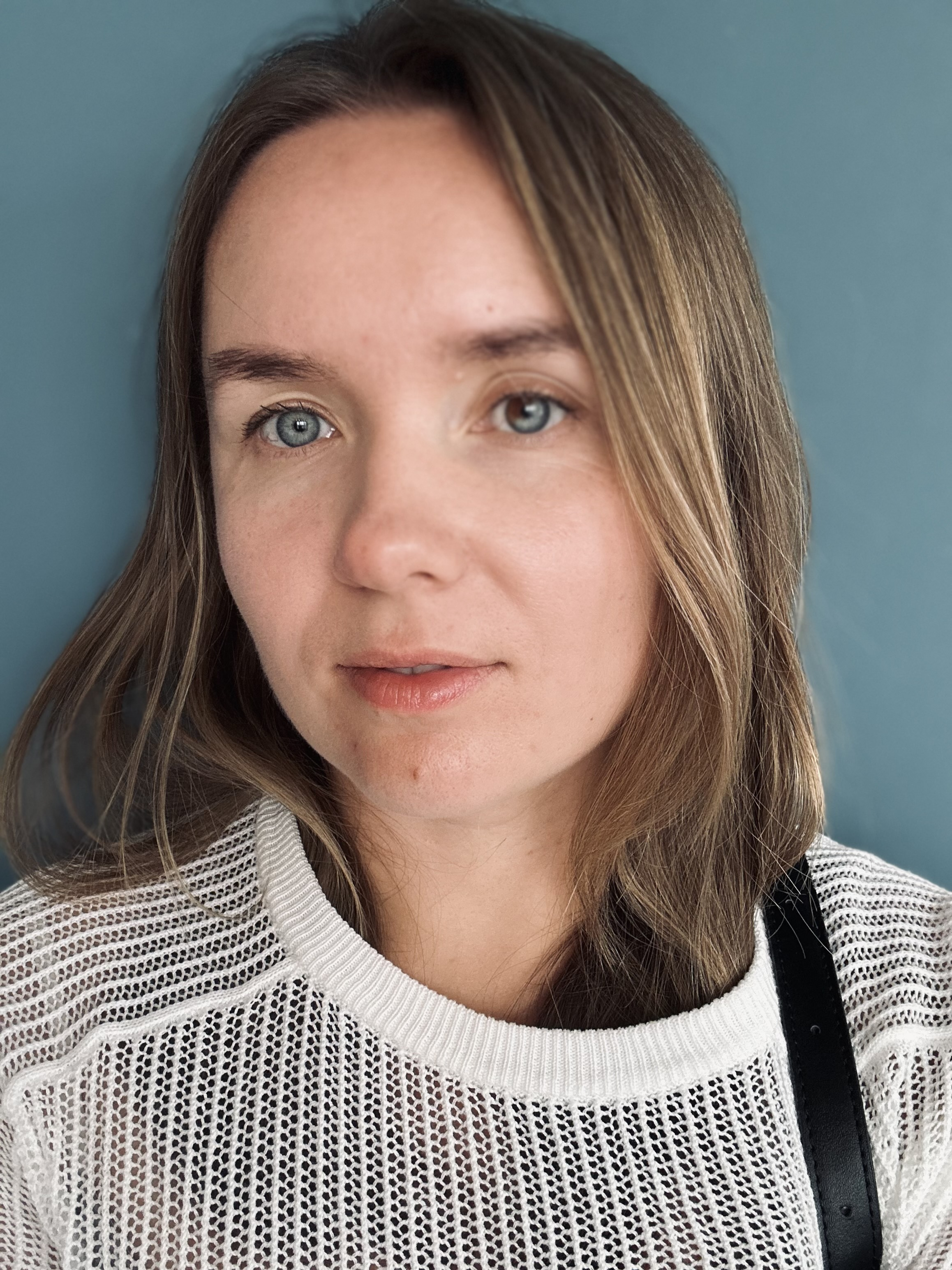
- Kuznietsova in September 2024
- Native name: Євгенія Кузнєцова
- Born: Kryvyi Rih, Dnipropetrovsk Oblast, Ukraine
- Occupation: Writer
- Notable awards: BBC News Ukraine Book of the Year (2023)
- Children: 2

Yevhenia Kuznietsova (Ukrainian: Євгенія Кузнєцова) is a Ukrainian author.

== Early life and personal life ==
Yevhenia Kuznietsova was born on 30 June 1987 in Kryvyi Rih in the Dnipropetrovsk region and grew up in the village of Khomutyntsi in Vinnytsia Oblast. After finishing the seventh grade, she moved with her family to Vinnytsia.

Kuznietsova enrolled at the Institute of International Relations of Taras Shevchenko National University of Kyiv and received a bachelor's degree in international relations in 2007. In 2009, she completed the master's program "International Information" at the same university. From 2007 to 2009, she also worked as a staff writer for the Kyiv Post. She later enrolled at the University of Deusto in Spain, earning a PhD in International and Intercultural Studies in 2015 by defending a dissertation on magical realism and teaching postcolonial studies.

Kuznietsova has lived and worked in the city of Koblenz, Germany. As of 2023, she resides in both Spain and Ukraine. She has a son and a daughter named Solomiya.

== Career ==
Kuznietsova worked as a consultant for the United Nations and the Organization for Security and Co-operation in Europe (OSCE).

=== Academic work ===
Kuznietsova's academic interests include media language analysis, internet anthropology, and the awakening of civil society. Her specializations include the role of media in society, media systems, and text analysis.

She conducted research with VoxUkraine on media habits and trends on social networks. In 2021, she worked on a project of the Kyiv School of Economics’ Center for Journalism in collaboration with the University of Oslo to study the media landscape of eastern Ukraine, including temporarily occupied territories.

=== Creative work ===
According to Kuznietsova, she always knew her life’s mission was to write: "Seeing the artistic in the non-artistic everyday life — that I get from my grandmother".

Kuznietsova's first book was a humorous culinary publication about Ukrainian eating habits, Cooking in Sorrow (Hotuiemo v zhurbi), written in 2020. Her first fiction book, Ask Miiechka (Spytai te Miiechku), was published in 2021 in the genre of magical realism. It was shortlisted for the BBC Book of the Year Award in 2021.

Kuznietsova's novel Drabyna won the BBC News Ukraine Book of the Year award in 2023.

She has translated literature of various genres. Among her translated works are: Team of Rivals: The Political Genius of Abraham Lincoln by Doris Kearns Goodwin, the nonfiction book The Death of Expertise: The Campaign Against Established Knowledge and Why it Matters by Thomas Nichols, and the romance novels Kiss in Paris and Kiss in New York by Catherine Rider.

She authored a popular science publication on language policy during the Soviet era titled "Language as a Sword: How the Soviet Empire Spoke" (Mova-mech: yak hovoryla radiansʹka imperiia), which was shortlisted for the EU Prize for Literature and the BBC News Ukraine Book of The Year. She also runs a YouTube channel based on the materials from the book.

Regarding future publications, Kuznietsova has said: "I do have such plans. Especially after publishing Cooking in Sorrow. I worked there with 30 Ukrainian illustrators and photographers and realized how amazing it is when your text is combined with cool illustrations! I understand I can't continue with everyone, but I have an incredible desire to work with those who have the time and inspiration, and to publish a children’s book".

== Bibliography ==
Kuznietsova has published five books:

- Готуємо в журбі (or Cooking in Sorrow), 2020
- Спитайте Мієчку (or Ask Miechka), 2021
- Драбина (or Ladder), 2023
- Мова-меч. Як говорила радянська імперія, 2023
- Коротка історія українського борщу (or A Brief History of the Ukrainian Borscht, illustrated by Sofia Sulii)
- Вівці цілі (or Whole Sheep), 2025
