= Tatiana Țîbuleac =

Moldovan-Romanian writer

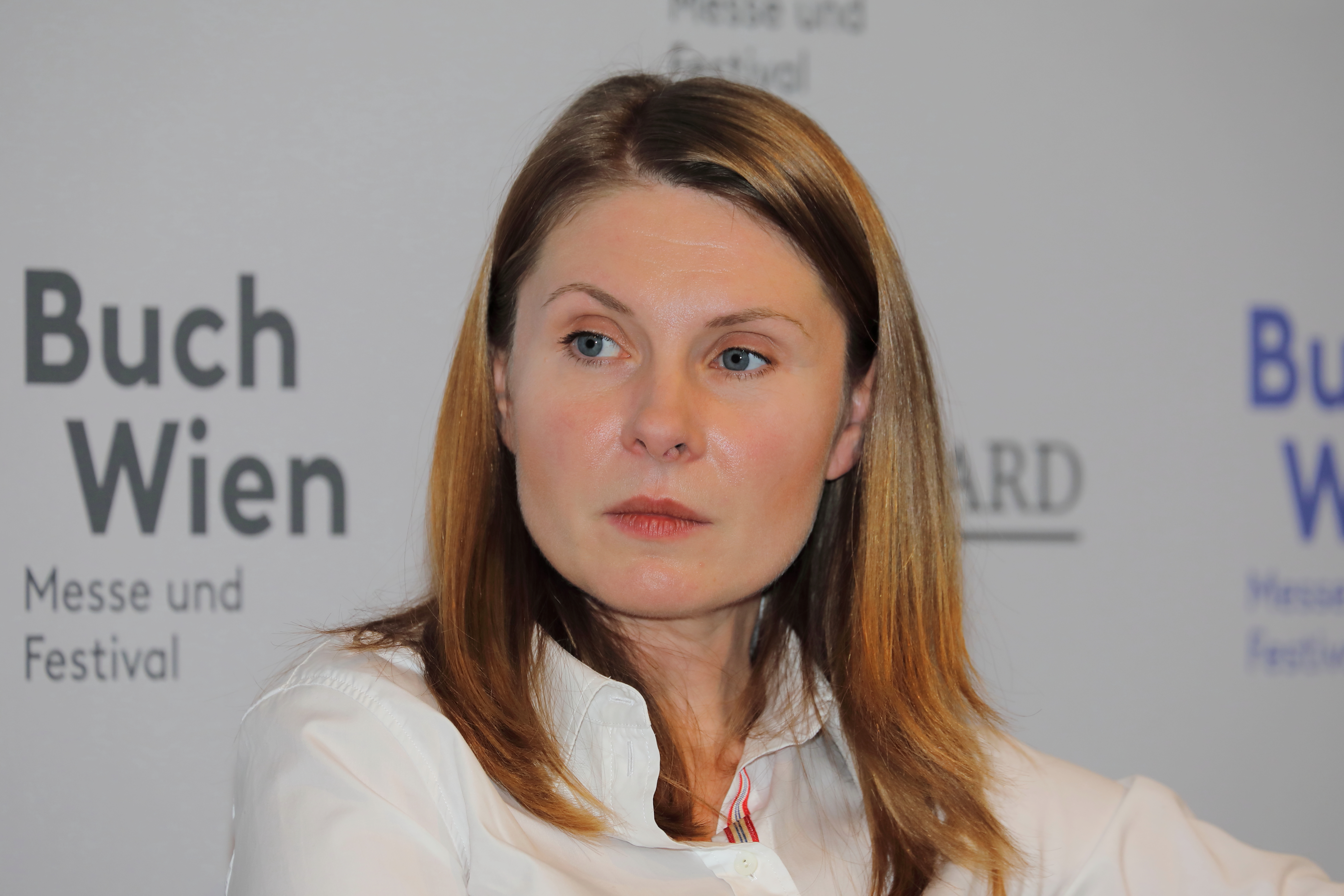
- Țîbuleac in 2023
- Born: 15 October 1978 (age 47); Chișinău, Moldavian SSR, Soviet Union
- Education: Moldova State University
- Occupation: Writer

Tatiana Țîbuleac (born 15 October 1978) is a Moldovan-Romanian writer. She is best known for her novel Vara în care mama a avut ochii verzi (The Summer My Mother Had Green Eyes) which was published in English in 2026.

== Biography ==
Țîbuleac was born in Chișinău on 15 October 1978. Her father was a journalist and her mother was a publisher, leading to her own interest in writing. She later studied journalism and communications at Moldova State University. She first gained renown for her "True Stories" column which appeared in the Flux newspaper in the mid-1990s. She also worked as a TV reporter and news anchor for ProTV Chișinău. She moved to Paris in 2008.

She published her first book, Fabule Moderne (Modern Tales), in 2014. It was an anthology of stories on the topic of immigration. She published her first novel Vara în care mama a avut ochii verzi (The Summer My Mother Had Green Eyes) in 2017. The novel won multiple literary prizes and has been translated into French, Spanish, Italian and English. Țîbuleac went on a book tour in America for the English-language edition of Vara în care mama a avut ochii verzi in the spring of 2026. Her second novel Grădina de sticlă (The Glass Garden) won the EU Prize for Literature. She has been translated into 17 languages.

== Published works ==
- 2014 Fabule Moderne
- 2017 Vara în care mama a avut ochii verzi
  - Țîbuleac, Tatiana (2026-01-13). The Summer My Mother Had Green Eyes. Translated by Monica Cure. ISBN 978-1-64605-409-1.
- 2018 Grădina de sticlă, roman, Editura Cartie, Premiul Uniunii Europene 2019
