= Chasing the King of Hearts =

2006 historical novel written by Hanna Krall

- First edition Polish cover
- Author: Hanna Krall
- Original title: Król kier znów na wylocie
- Translator: Philip Boehm
- Language: Polish
- Publisher: Świat Książki
- Publication date: 2006
- Publication place: Poland
- English publication date: 2013
- Media type: Print, ebook
- Pages: 160 pages
- ISBN: 8324702822 2006 Polish edition

Chasing the King of Hearts is a historical novel written by Hanna Krall. The novel was originally published in Polish as Król kier znów na wylocie in 2006 and was translated into English by Phillip Boehm as Chasing the King of Hearts in 2013. It follows the life story of Izolda Regensberg during the Holocaust in vignettes, short chapters often less than a page long.

== Plot ==
Living in Warsaw, Poland around 1940, Izolda and her family witness the city transform into a ghetto created to contain Jewish citizens. After she marries a Jewish man named Shayek, they escape the Warsaw Ghetto and obtain fake Polish identities as the Pawlicki’s. While Izolda stays in the Hotel Polski while visiting her friend Jurek, Germans surround the hotel and arrest everyone, Poles and Jews alike. She is sent to Pawiak as a Pole, where she witnesses many Jews murdered, including Shayek’s mother. Eventually, she is released from Pawiak as a non-Jew, and is reunited with her husband. However, Shayek is found to be a Jew while working in Kraków and is sent to Auschwitz. When Izolda finds out where her husband is, she begins working as a smuggler to send Shayek packages of food and supplies until he is transferred to Ebensee, a subcamp of Mauthausen. She travels to Vienna in attempts to gain information about how to rescue her husband from Mauthausen, but she ends up being arrested by the Viennese Gestapo and tortured until she reveals that she is a Jew. She is then sent to Auschwitz but is transferred to Guben by persuading Dr. Mengele that she has nursing experience. She escapes Guben and returns to Vienna where she begins working at a military hospital for the German army. When the Soviet army captures the city, they realize that Izolda is a Jew, so they help her to get across the American front to rescue her husband from Mauthausen. She finally reaches her King of Hearts, but a few years later, after having a few children together, Shayek ends up leaving Izolda, consumed by guilt that his entire family died except for him. The story ends in the 21st century in Israel with Izolda telling her family stories of her struggles in the Holocaust.

== Characters ==
- Izolda Regensberg (Polish Alias - Maria Pawlicka) is the main character of the story. Her determination and strength are emphasized in her struggle to reunite with her husband.
- Yeshayahu Wolf, known as Shayek by his wife Izolda, is the King of Hearts. He is taken captive early in the story and is the focus of the protagonist’s journey. Throughout the story Shayek is presented as a man overwhelmed by guilt who believes he does not deserve to live.
- Lilusia Szubert is a Polish friend of Izolda who gives her the fake identity of Maria Pawlicka, dyes her hair blonde, and teaches her how to act as a Pole.
- Terenia is the sister of Lilusia and a fortuneteller. She gives Izolda a tarot card reading with Shayek representing the King of Hearts, giving Izolda a goal to chase after.
- Jurek Szwarcwald is introduced as Izolda’s first love before she meets Shayek. He introduces her to Bolek before he and his wife flee Poland.
- Bolek is a Polish construction manager working in the Warsaw Ghetto by day and smuggling out Jews by night. He helps Izolda get Shayek out of the ghetto.

== Historical context ==
The majority of this novel takes place in Poland during the 1940s. During this time, anyone found out to be Jewish was taken away to concentration camps in the horror known as the Holocaust. Many of these camps and German prisons are present throughout Chasing the King of Hearts.

The first German camp introduced in the novel is the Pawiak Prison in Warsaw, Poland. Over 37 thousand Jews were executed here, including Shayek’s mother. Following Izolda’s stay in this prison as a Pole, her husband is abducted out of Krakow, presumably during the liquidation of Krakow in 1943. Thousands of Jews who were taken during the liquidation were taken to Auschwitz. Mauthausen and Auschwitz were two of the biggest concentration camps created for the Jews and are both present in Chasing the King of Hearts. Shayek and Izolda both spend time in Auschwitz and Shayek is sent to a sub-camp of Mauthausen, Ebensee. Ebensee was a labor camp to construct tunnels for Germany, so survival here was much more likely since there were not exterminations as in many others. Izolda and Shayek are reunited after Ebensee’s liberation in 1945.

Other historical sites are referenced during the book including Izolda’s brief stay at the Viennese Gestapo, The Hotel Metropole. It is here that she learns of the Warsaw Ghetto and is taken away to Auschwitz as a Jew, most likely taking place around early 1944, between the time of the Warsaw Uprising and the hotel’s destruction.

== Critical acclaim and awards ==
- Original Polish version shortlisted for the 2007 Angelus Central European Literary Award
- Guardian’s Best Fiction 2013
- Guardian Readers’ Book of the Year 2013
- English PEN Best Yule Read 2013
- English PEN Award 2013
- 2014 Found in Translation Award
- One of Publishers Weekly’s Best Books of 2017
- 2018 English PEN Translation Prize
