= Antoni Libera =

Polish writer, translator, literary critic, and theatre director

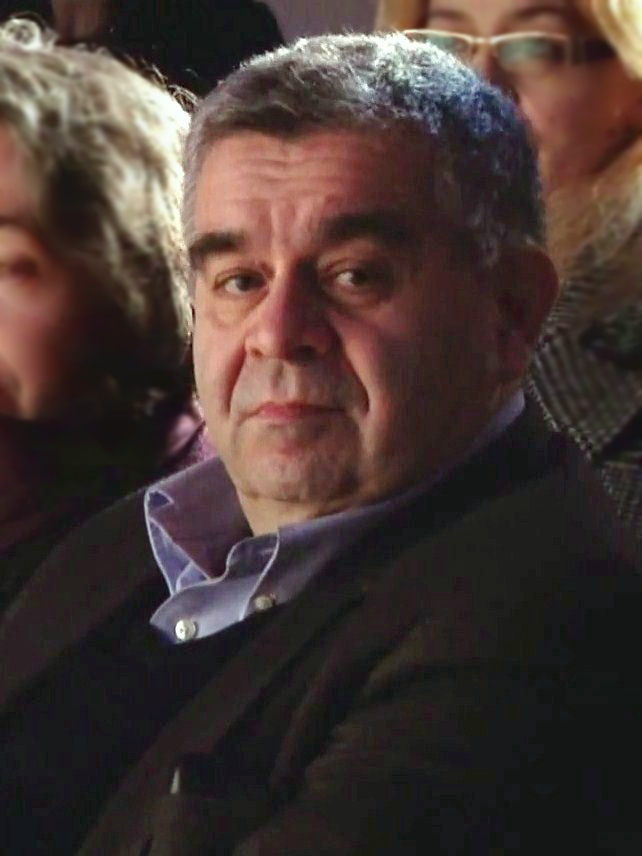
Antoni Libera

Antoni Libera (born 19 April 1949 in Warsaw) is a Polish writer, translator, literary critic, and theatre director. He graduated from Warsaw University and received his Ph.D. from the Polish Academy of Sciences. He is a member of the Pen Club, the Polish Writers Association (Stowarzyszenie Pisarzy Polskich), and the American Samuel Beckett Society.

== Biography ==
He is the son of Polish-Jewish historian Zdzisław Libera, who survived the Warsaw Ghetto. His original surname was Libin.

Libera is best known for his translations and productions of Samuel Beckett's plays. He has translated all of Beckett's dramatic works into Polish, as well as some of his other works. He has also directed many of Beckett's plays in Poland, Great Britain, Ireland, and the U.S. Many famous Polish actors have appeared in those plays, including Tadeusz Łomnicki, Zbigniew Zapasiewicz, Maja Komorowska, Adam Ferency, Zbigniew Zamachowski, and Andrzej Seweryn, along with British actors like Barry McGovern and David Warrilow.

His other translations include Shakespeare "Macbeth", Sophocles "Antigone" and "Oedipus the King", Oscar Wilde "Salome", Friedrich Hölderlin, Constantine Cavafy, and others. He has translated a number of opera librettos as well, such as "Death in Venice" by Benjamin Britten, "Black mask", and "Ubu King" by Krzysztof Penderecki.

In 1990 he was commissioned by the London Royal Court Theatre to write the play "Eastern Promises," which was performed in that theatre and published in "The May Days Dialogues" by Methuen in 1990 (Polish title: "Czy Europa musi zginąć"? published in "Dialog").

Libera's first novel, Madame (1998), was awarded the Grand Prix from Znak (a major Polish publishing house) and nominated for the 1999 Nike Literary Award. In 2002 it was again nominated for the International Dublin Literary Award. The novel has been translated into 20 languages.

In 2009, Libera published the autobiographical work "Godot i jego cień" (Godot's Shadow), which was nominated for an Angelus Award and the Jan Michalski Prize for Literature.

From 1988 to 1993, Libera was one of the editors of the magazine "Puls", and from 1996 to 2001 he was a literary director at the Dramatic Theater in Warsaw.

In October 2010 he was awarded the Silver Gloria Artis Medal for Merit to Culture.

== Works ==
Original works

- "Madame" (a novel) (Znak, 1998)
- "Błogosławieństwo Becketta i inne wyznania literackie" (Sic!, 2004)
- "Liryki lozańskie" (short story) in "Pokaz prozy" (WL, 2006)
- "Godot i jego cień" (autobiographical prose) (Znak, 2009)
- "Niech się panu darzy" (three novellas) (Więź, 2013)

Translations and studies

- Beckett, S. "Pisma prozą" (Czytelnik 1982)
- Beckett, S. "Dzieła dramatyczne" (PIW 1988)
- Szpotański, J. "Zebrane utwory poetyckie" (Puls 1990)
- Beckett, S. "Dramaty" (Biblioteka Narodowa, Ossolineum 1995, 1999)
- Barańczak, S. "Zimy i podróże. Lekcja literatury z Antonim Liberą [selected poems]" (WL 1997)
- Beckett, S. "Wierność przegranej [esseys]" (Znak 1999)
- Beckett, S. "Dramaty", "Kanon na Koniec Wieku" (PIW 2002)
- Shakespeare, W. "Makbet" (Noir Sur Blanc 2002)
- Hölderlin, F. "Co się ostaje, ustanawiają poeci [selected poems]" (Znak 2003), (słowo/obraz terytoria 2009)
- Szpotański, J. "Gnom; Caryca; Szmaciak [satiric works and autobiographical fragments]" (LTW 2003)
- Wilde, O. "Dwie sceny miłosne [Salome, Tragedia florencka]" (PIW 2003)
- Beckett, S. "Molloy i cztery nowele" (Znak 2004)
- Beckett, S. "No właśnie co [selected works]" (PIW 2010)
- Kawafis, K. "Jeżeli do Itaki wybierasz się w podróż... [selected poems]" (Znak 2011)
- Racine, J. "Fedra" (PIW, 2011)
- Sofokles "Filoktet" (PIW 2012)
- Sofokles "Król Edyp" (PIW 2012)
