= Polina Zherebtsova's Journal =

Book by Polina Zherebtsova

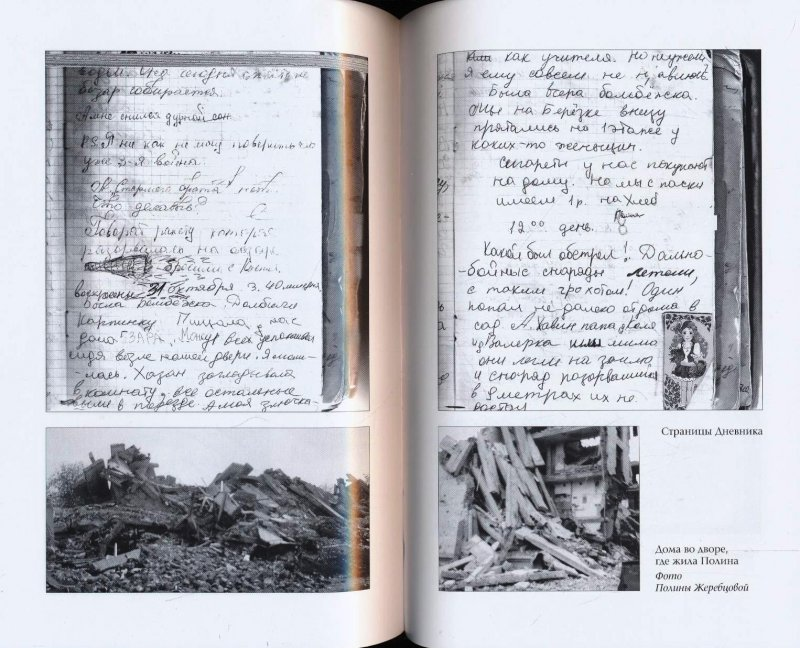
Polina Zherebtsova's Journal

Polina Zherebtsova's Journal: Chechnya 1999-2002 is the edited diary kept by Polina Zherebtsova while she was living in Grozny, the capital of the Chechen Republic. It was published in September 2011 in Russia. Zherebtsova wrote the diary when she was 14–17 years old, from the beginning of The Second Chechen War until December 2002. It tells the story of ethnic relations between Russian and Chechen peoples and of the lives of civilians during the war. This book is non-fiction, but real names were changed by the author in the book.

According to The Guardian, Zherebtsova said of the book:

I don't scold anyone in particular, neither the rebels nor the Russian soldiers ... There is no evil in the book – just the life of civilians who fell into life in war

The published in Russia book resulted in a hatred campaign against the author, and she was forced to flee to Finland, where Polina Zherebtsova asked for political asylum.

== Biography ==
Polina Zherebtsova, a documentarian, poet and author of the famous diaries, covering her childhood, adolescence and youth that witnessed three Chechen wars. Since 2002, she has begun to work as a journalist. She is a member of PEN International and the Union of Journalists of Russia. She has been awarded the Janusz Korczak international prize in Jerusalem in two categories (narrative and documentary prose). In 2012, she was awarded The Andrei Sakharov Award "For Journalism as an Act of Conscience". Since 2013, she has been living in Finland.

Polina Zherebtsova was born in 1985 in Grozny and lived there for almost twenty years. She considers herself a cosmopolitan as she has multi-national ancestry. Polina's father died when she was very young. Polina's maternal grandfather Zherebtsov Anatoly Pavlovich, with whom she had formed a friendship, worked in Grozny for more than 25 years as a TV journalist-cameraman. Polina's maternal grandmother was a professional artist. Paternal grandfather was an actor and musician. Polina's paternal grandmother was a professional actress.

On 25 March 1994, days after she turned nine, Polina started writing in a diary in which she recorded what was happening around her. Her diaries cover her childhood, adolescence and youth that witnessed three Chechen wars. School, first love, quarrels with parents, what is familiar to any teenager, side by side in the life of Polina with the bombing, starvation, devastation and poverty.

On October 21 of 1999 she was wounded by shrapnel during a missile attack on Grozny Central Market.

Since 2002, she has begun to work as a journalist. In 2003-2004, she studied at the School of Correspondents.

In 2004, Chechen diary was completed when the author was 19 years old.

In 2006 she was awarded the Janusz Korczak international prize in Jerusalem in two categories (narrative and documentary prose). Competition theme was "terror and children."

Since 2007, she has been a member of the Russian Union of Journalists.

In 2010, she graduated from the Stavropol North Caucasus University with a degree in General Psychology.

In 2011, "Polina Zherebtsova's Journal: Chechnya 1999-2002" was published.

Since 2012, she has been a member of PEN International.

In 2012, she was awarded The Andrei Sakharov Award "For Journalism as an Act of Conscience".

In 2013, she has received a political asylum in Finland.

In 2014, "Ant in a Glass Jar" was published.
