= Tomáš Zmeškal =

Czech writer (born 1966)

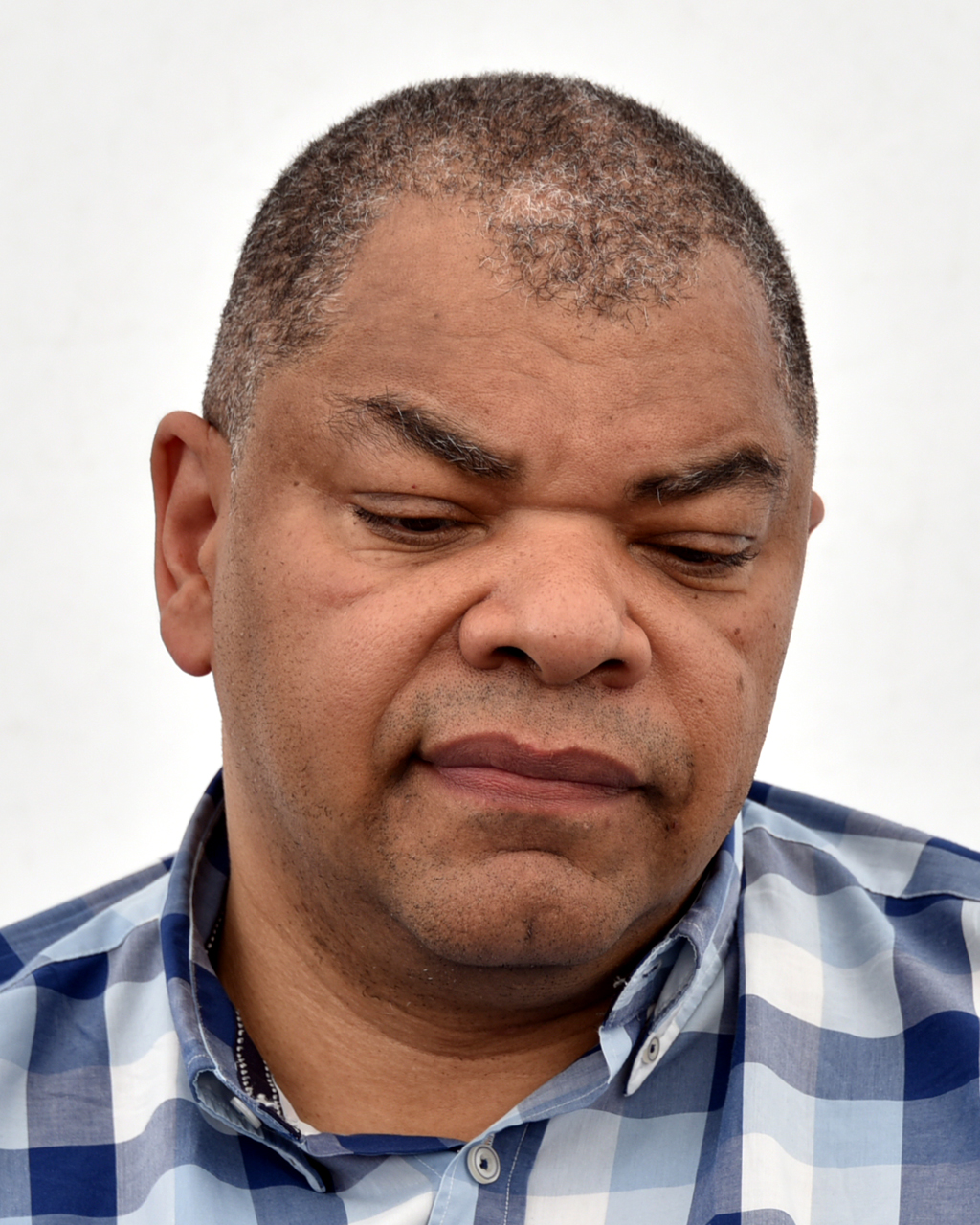
Tomáš Zmeškal (2019)

Tomáš Zmeškal (born 1966) is a Czech writer. He was born in Prague to a Congolese father and a Czech mother. In 1987, he left the then-Czechoslovakia to live in London, where he studied English language and literature at King's College. He returned after the collapse of communism. He taught at Charles University for a while, and currently teaches in high school.

Zmeškal was lauded for his debut novel Milostný dopis klínovým písmem (Love Letter in Cuneiform Script), published in 2008. The book won the EU Prize for Literature and the Josef Škvorecký Prize. He has published two other books since.

In the 1980s, he was a member of the band Psí vojáci, led by Filip Topol. Zmeškal now lives in Prague.

== Works ==
- Milostný dopis klínovým písmem, Torst 2008, Praha, ISBN 978-80-7215-349-7
- Životopis černobílého jehněte, Torst 2009, ISBN 978-80-7215-372-5
- Sokrates na rovníku, Mishkezy 2013, ISBN 978-80-87886-00-7
