= Dieter Kalka =

German singer-songwriter (born 1957)

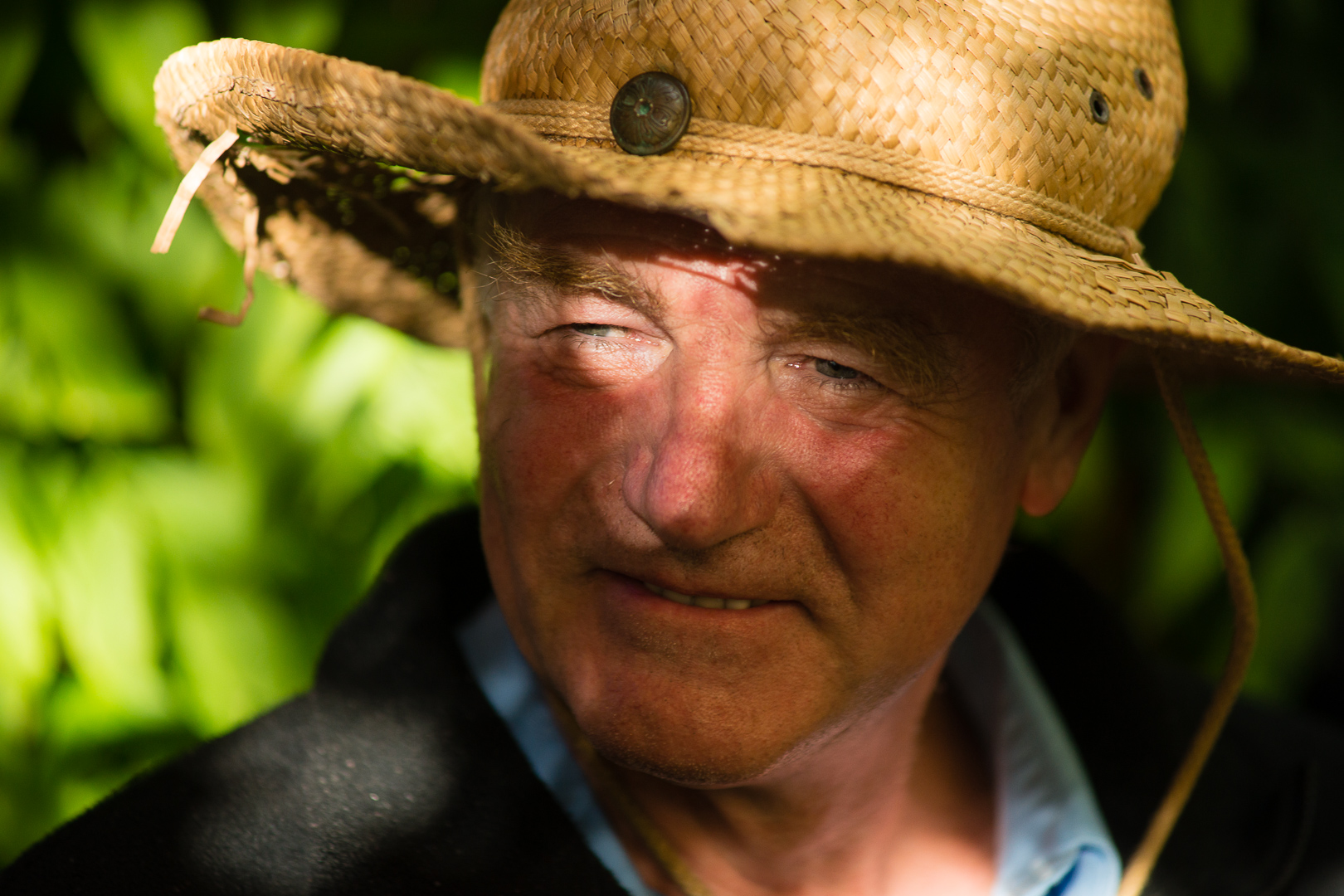
Dieter Kalka in 2017

Dieter Kalka (born 25 June 1957) is a German writer, songwriter, poet, dramatist, musician, editor, translator and speech therapist.

== Biography ==
Dieter Kalka was born on 25 June 1957 in Altenburg. He began the study of electrical engineering and mathematics at the Technische Universität Ilmenau in 1978. In 1980, he was forced to abandon his studies due to the distribution and possession of illegal publications. He was a member of the folk group "Feuertanz", founded in 1978, while in 1984 he founded Dieters Frohe Zukunft (Dieter's Happy Future). He wrote his own folksongs, together with Uwe Schimmel on the French horn, Uta Mannweiler on the viola, while he himself played Bandoneon. With this group he organised the illegal artists' meeting "Ringelfolk" in Wurzen, which was devoid of censorship. The unauthorized promotional material for this, and other actions, he copied at the photo lab of Petra Lux.

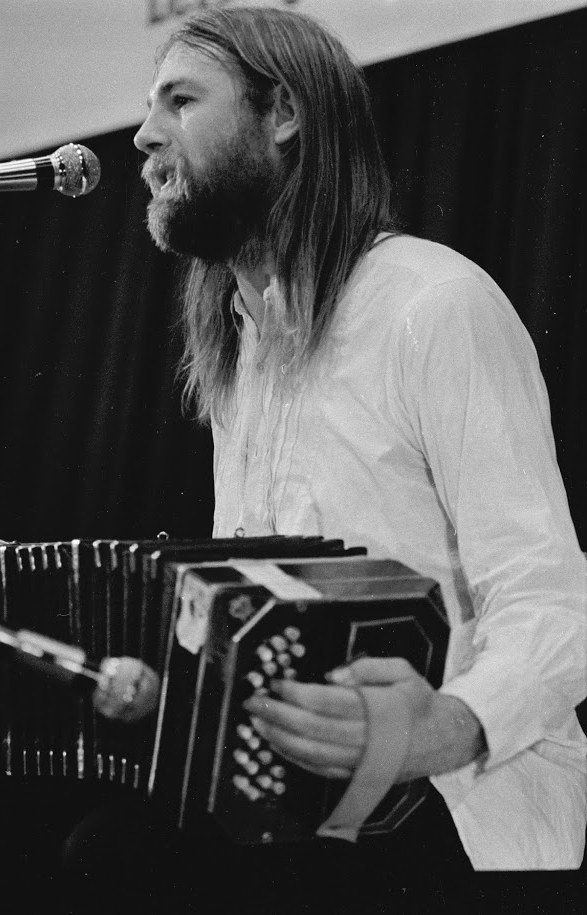
Leipziger Liederszene, Dieter Kalka with bandoneon

Dieter Kalka was "the fiercest among the Leipzig song singers". Since the mid-1980s he has worked as a freelance singer and has repeatedly participated in the Chanson days Kloster Michaelstein (GDR-open Chanson days in the Monastery at Michaelstein). He made samizdat productions in the private studio of Hubertus Schmidt in 1987, with Peter Gläser in 1988 and at the official Kölling studio in Leipzig in 1989. After collaborating with Werner Bernreuther in 1987, he received a professional certificate as a songwriter, won a prize at the Chanson days of the GDR (Chanson days in Frankfurt/Oder) and a prize at the Leipzig Songwriter Workshop, which he later publicly returned as they wanted to dictate to him which song he should sing at the final concert. He has received several scholarships of Saxony and was, for a time, a member of the Independent Writers Association "ASSO" Dresden, the NGL/New Society for Literature, the Writers Association "VS" and the "Förderkreis Freie Literaturgesellschaft Leipzig".

Dieter Kalkas first published book was entitled "Eine übersensible Regung unterm Schuhabsatz" (An Over Sensitive Motion Under the Heel) and released in 1987 as samizdat. In 1990 he prepared as project manager for the first Alternative Leipzig Book Fair. Within the Association of German writers he organized in 1995 in Leipzig, the German-Polish poets’ festival "wortlust". He has translated Polish poetry into German. The sunken GDR reality is the subject of his "Der ungepflückte Apfelbaum", published in 1998. Kalka's texts have been published in German, Polish, Austrian, Canadian and Belarusian literary magazines.

Kalka was twice in Belarus for the songwriter's festival "Bardentreffen", and appeared with his Belarusian colleague Victor Shalkevich. At the Saxon Literature Spring in 2003, he dedicated his "Freiheitslied Nr. 2" (Freedom Song No.2) to his Belarusian colleague Victor Shalkevich in the hope that better times will come. He participated in the German-Polish poets steamer on the border river Oder and the Orpheus Project in Wrocław, Bad Muskau and Lwówek Śląski. At the poets steamer the Poet's wedding also took place in 1998 between Dieter Kalka and Zielona Góra fairy tale author, Agnieszka Haupe, at the Frankfurt Oderbrücke.

Kalka has appeared on various programs with his bandoneon and playing his own songs, such as in 1988 with the theme "Noch habe ich die Freiheit zu lieben" (I still have the freedom to love). He also sang at times at the songwriter-festival Burg Waldeck. His songs "are not without a bitter aftertaste. He puts his finger on compromises that everybody engages in almost every day of their life, or feel compelled to close. Former ideals are often forgotten”. He has written lyrics for folk opera and has written about "The revival of the East German singer-songwriter scene". His concerts have taken him to Poland, Belarus, Czech Republic, Hungary, Switzerland, Austria and Denmark. His songs are on numerous CDs.

Dieter Kalka works as a speech therapist and lives in Leipzig and Meuselwitz.

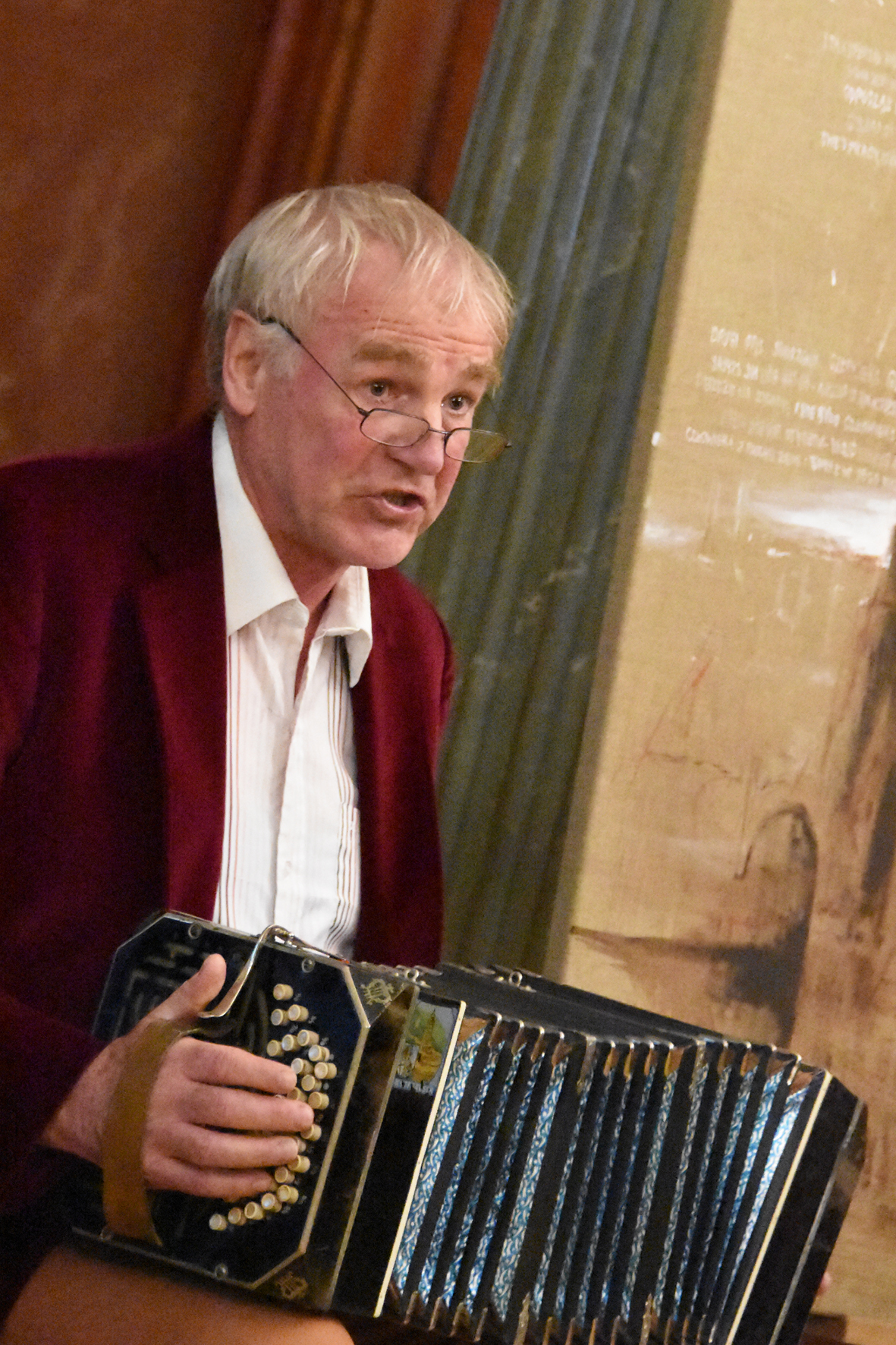
Dieter Kalka with bandoneon at Literary Autumn in Poznań 2018

== Works ==
=== Books ===
- Eine übersensible Regung unterm Schuhabsatz. Poetry. Stecknadel Samizdat, Leipzig 1988.
- Der ungepflückte Apfelbaum. Erzählungen. Short stories. Gollenstein, Blieskastel 1998. ISBN 3-930008-71-8.
- "Wszystko to tylko teatr i inne opowiadania" Short stories. Translation into Polish: Marek Śnieciński and Gabriela Matuszek. Poznań 1999, ISBN 83-87235-26-1
- Der Schleier. Poetry. Die Scheune, Dresden 1999. ISBN 3-931684-26-1.
- Lubliner Lift/Lubelska winda. German-Polish anthology. (editor.), Preface: Erich Loest, bilingual, Verlag Die Scheune, Dresden and wydawnictwo "test" Lublin 1999. ISBN 3-931684-27-X
- Beulenspiegels sieben Streiche vor Sonnenuntergang, Dreiunddreißig Beulenspiegeliaden, ein Chanson und drei Zugaben, Lyrik, Edition Beulenspiegel im AndreBuchVerlag, Halblech 2018, ISBN 9-783942-469425
- Beulenspiegelinchen, lyric for children, Edition Beulenspiegel im AndreBuchVerlag, Halblech 2018, ISBN 9-783942-469494
- Sudička, novel, Salomo-Publishing, Dresden 2018.
- Die Vogtlandreise, with 17 drawings by Jürgen B. Wolff, prose, Edition Beulenspiegel, 2020, ISBN 9-783942-469869
- Osterland ist abgebrannt, Essays und Clownerien, drawings by Akram Mutlak, Edition Beulenspiegel, AndreBuchVerlag 2021 ISBN 9-783942-469982
- Negerküsse in Zigeunersoße, Essay, drawings by Werner Bernreuther, Edition Beulenspiegel, AndreBuchVerlag 2021 ISBN 9-783949-143045
- Odins Met und Orfeus’ Gesang, an essay and poems by Marek Śnieciński, Peter Gehrisch, Bohdan Kos and Waldemar Okon. Pictures by Bernd Kerkin, Edition Beulenspiegel, AndreBuchverlag, Lengenfeld, ISBN 978-3-949143-20-5
- Feuerlöscher und Hydrant, 3 1/2 fairy tales, with Agnieszka Haupe, Edition Beulenspiegel, AndreBuchverlag, Lengenfeld 2023, ISBN 978-3949143243.
- Dreierland, paintings by Werner Bernreuther, editor and texts, LIT-Verlag, Vienna 2023, ISBN 978-3-643-80396-2.
- Das Bandoneon des Kulturministers, novel, Akademische Verlagsbuchhandlung Friedrich Mauke, Jena 2023, ISBN 978-3-948259-17-4.
- Die Disharmonika, songs and poems, Christian Friedrich Fritz Fried Wandel Hohberg, editor, Edition Beulenspiegel, AndreBuchverlag, Lengenfeld 2023, ISBN 978-3-949143-23-6.
- Dreizehn Reisen nach Auschwitz/Oswiecim / OŚWIĘCIM. AUSCHWITZ. TRZYNAŚCIE WIZYT, prose with paintings of Halina Kozioł, German-Polish, Edition Beulenspiegel, AndreBuchverlag, Lengenfeld 2024, ISBN 978-3-949143-40-3.
- Das kleine schwarze Tier / MAŁE, CZARNE ZWIERZĘ, prose with drawings of Rainer Strege, German-Polish, Edition Beulenspiegel, AndreBuchverlag, Lengenfeld 2025, ISBN 978-3-949143-49-6.
- NOTEINGANG, Emergency Entrance, Songs 1979–2026, featuring 165 songs, 41 scores, 393 pages, translations into Polish, Belarusian and Sorbian, one text in Yiddish, with graphics, drawings and posters. AndreBuchverlag, Lengenfeld 2026. ISBN 978-3-949143-51-9.

==== Anthologies ====
- Mein heimlicher Grund, Kiepenheuer 1996.
- Nach den Gewittern, Steidl 1999, Nachdichtung.
- Literatur aus Polen. (editor) Poetry in: Muschelhaufen. Jahresschrift für Literatur. Nr. 41. Viersen 2001. ISSN 0085-3593.
- Żywe oczy wiersza / Augen des Gedichts, anthology, Polish-German, translation, publisher Jolanta Pytel and Czesŀaw Sobkowiak, Organon Zielona Góra 2001. ISBN 83-87294-25-X
- Jak podanie ręki / Wie ein Händedruck, anthology Polish-German, Libra, Poznań 2017.

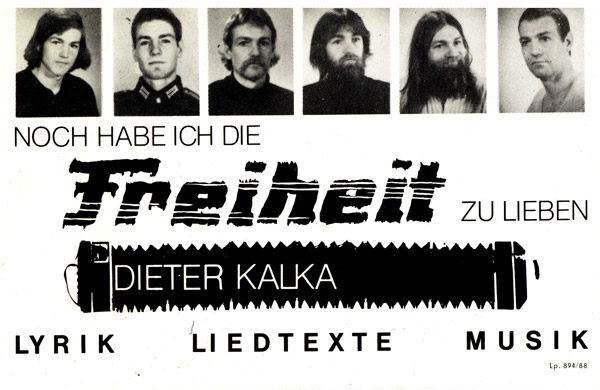
Flyer

- Helikopter, Tak trafiłem do Słowian/So kam ich unter die Slawen, prose, translation by Marek Śnieciński Wrocław 2016,
- Afront, Oświęcim. Auschwitz. 13 wizyt, prose, translation by Agnieszka Haupe, Bukowno 2022
- Libertas, Jahrbuch der Meinungsfreiheit, LIT-Verlag, Münster 2022.

=== CD/MC ===
- Noch habe ich die Freiheit zu lieben. Songs. Leipziger Liederwerkstatt. Kompaktkassette. Stecknadel, Leipzig 1988.
- Uferlose Wälder, CD, Sundance Studio LE & Monster's Town 1998
- Breinachten, Dieter Kalka & Die Piratenband, 2008, Children' s songs, Sundance Studio LE & Monster's Town
- Barbie Kugelrund, Dieter Kalka & Die Rasselbande, 2009, Children' s Songs, Sundance Studio LE & Monster's Town
- Zooshop, Dieter Kalka & Die Rasselbande, 2010, Children's Songs, Sundance Studio LE & Monster's Town
- Sachsen wie noch nie. Lieder aus Leipzig. Songs. Participation. CD. F.A.N.-Verlag, Leipzig 2000
- Mitternachtsgesänge, Die verlorenen Lieder des Jooschen Engelke 1918 – 1962, Participation, 2010, Conträr Music
- Chance For The Link Of A Chain, CD, DICE, 2017, Dieter Kalka - Bandoneon
- L.E.IPZIGER LIEDERSZENE der 1980er Jahre, CD/DVD and book. Participation and redaction. Loewenzahn/RUM Records. Leipzig 2018.

=== Song programs ===
- Meuselwitzer Lieder, 1982
- Der Bauernmarkt von Klein-Paris, 1984
- Das utopische Festival, 1985
- Noch habe ich die Freiheit zu lieben, 1988
- Sonnen-Wende, 1989

=== Theater ===
- Das Experiment oder Zwej unglejche Brieder. Spectacle. World Premiere in Leipzig 1998
- Dabei hatte alles so gut angefangen, folk opera for the band: Feuertanz

=== Translation ===
Dieter Kalka translated Polish poets: Marek Śnieciński, Jan Strządała, Krzysztof Paczuski, Waldemar Dras, Józef Baran, Marta Fox, Katarzyna Jarosz-Rabiej, Agnieszka Haupe, Jolanta Pytel, Wladyslaw Klepka, Ludmiła Marjańska, Bogdan Kos, Grzegorz Stec, Jakub Malukow Danecki, Bohdan Zadura, Waldemar Michalski, Alekzander Rozenfeld and others. The poetry was published in Ostragehege, Muschelhaufen, the anthology Lubliner Lift/Lubelska winda, manuskripte, the anthologies "Es ist Zeit, wechsle die Kleider", "Nach den Gewittern" and at PortalPolen.

== Bibliography ==
- Wilhelm Bartsch: Dieter Kalka. Ein Schnitter aus Sachsen. Published in: Mitteldeutsche Zeitung, 30 March 1998
- Moritz Jähnig: Standortbestimmung persönlicher Natur. Published in: Die Union, October 1989
- Das mysteriöse Ende des montrösen Diktators H. Gelunge Schreiber Inszenierung von Kalkas „Experiment“ im „theater fact. Published in: Leipziger Volkszeitung, 25 September 1998
- David Robb: The GDR Singebewegung. Metamorphosis an Legacy Published in: Monatshefte. Nr. 2. University of Wisconsin 2000
- Norbert Weiss: Kunst auf dem Lande. Kalka erzählt von Bohemiens in der Dorfpraxis. Published in: Süddeutsche Zeitung, 25./26.04. 1998
- Ossi na etacie błanzna, Lublin, STOP, 27 March 1992
