= Häusler =

- Romanization: Haeusler, Haeusner.

Origin
- Languages: German, English
- Origin: German
- Meaning: Inhabitant

Other names
- Variant forms: Hausler, Häussler, Hausner, Häusner

Häusler is a common surname of Germanic origin, sometimes romanized as Haeusler. Its variant forms include Hausler, Häussler, Hausner and Häusner.

== Notable people ==
- Charles A. Hausler (1889–1971), American architect
- Cherie Hausler, Australian TV presenter of the Nine Network quiz show The Mint (Australia)
- Claudia Häusler (born 1985), German professional cyclist
- Laurel Hausler, contemporary oil painter and sculptor
- Moritz Häusler (born 1901), Austrian football inside forward who played professionally in Austria and the United States

== See also ==
- Häussler, a surname
