= Stec (surname) =

Stec and Steć are Polish-language surnames which literally are diminutives from the given name Stefan. The Ukrainian-language variant is Stets.

Notable people with the surname include:

- Anna Stec
- Dan Stec
- David Stec
- Gabriela Matuszek-Stec
- Grzegorz Stec, Polish painter
- Jeff Stec
- Joey Stec
- Stanisław Stec
- Stefan Stec (Polish aviator), pioneer of the Polish military aviation, credited as designer of the Polish Air Force's insignia
- Stefan Stec (UN peacekeeper), major of Polish Armed Forces
