= Christiane Ufholz =

German singer

- Born: Christiane Wunder; September 1, 1947; Leipzig, Germany
- Died: January 1, 2023 (aged 75) Berlin, Germany
- Genres: Jazz, Rock
- Occupation: Singer
- Years active: 1960s–2023
- Formerly of: Dresden-Sextet, Günther Fischer Sextet, Windminister

Christiane Ufholz, stage name of Christiane Wunder (born September 1, 1947 in Leipzig, found dead on January 1, 2023 in Berlin) was a German singer.

== Biography ==
As a child, Christiane Wunder sang for ten years in the Leipzig Radio Children's Choir. After her studies, she trained to become a hairdresser.

She began her career as a rock singer with Butlers, an amateur band from Leipzig founded by Klaus Renft. After the band was banned, which sparked the Leipzig Beat Demo, Ufholz joined Studio Team Leipzig, an amateur group where Uschi Brüning and Regine Dobberschütz also sang for a time.

Starting in 1972, Ufholz sang with the Dresden-Sextet, a jazz-rock band led by Gerhard Zachar, from which Lift emerged a year later. At the time, Lift played blues, soul, and gospel music and was influenced by the singing of Stephan Trepte and Christiane Ufholz. With the band, she recorded several singles for the Amiga label between 1973 and 1975. After two years of training, working with musicians like Franz Bartzsch, Stephan Trepte, Till Patzer, and Wolfgang Scheffler, she matured musically and became a professional singer when Klaus Lenz noticed her.

In 1975, she toured with one of Klaus Lenz's big bands and recorded another album with the group. Meanwhile, she made a name for herself as a jazz singer and was introduced to Günther Fischer's sextet in 1976 as a guest soloist. She performed several concerts with Fischer and Manfred Krug, accompanied Krug in a song on his LP Du bist heute wie neu, and sang to Günther Fischer's compositions in the DEFA film Hostess by Rolf Römer.

At the end of 1976, Christiane Ufholz signed an open letter against the expatriation of Wolf Biermann. On the morning of 24 December 1976, she was informed that she had to leave the GDR before midnight. She came to West Berlin on Christmas Eve with a small child and luggage. Upon leaving the GDR, her career temporarily ended, and she returned to hairdressing.

Eberhard Klunker and Olaf Wegner founded the band Windminister in West Berlin in 1980. They had previously played together in the Hansi Biebl Blues Band, which was banned from performing in the GDR in 1975 after their escape. Windminister also included former Klaus Renft Combo singer Thomas Schoppe, Klaus Renft, and Christiane Ufholz. However, the band's project did not prove particularly successful, so the three left the band shortly afterward. Klunker and Wegner kept the band name and continued as a guitar duo. After the fall of the Berlin Wall, collaboration between Windminister and Ufholz resumed. They toured together in the eastern states of Germany and were so successful that Ufholz began her comeback.

Klaus Renft also returned to eastern Germany in the early 1990s and started his … als ob nichts gewesen wär tour in 1997-1998, accompanied by Peter

Cäsar

Cäsar. Gläser, Gerulf Pannach, and Christiane Ufholz. She was on stage with him again at the concert for Klaus Renft's 60th birthday and the 40th anniversary of the Leipzig Beatdemo in October 2005. On 21 November 2006, she attended his funeral and performed with Hans-Jürgen Beyer, the Renftband, and Cäsar's Spieler at Klaus Renft's memorial concert. Peter

Cäsar

Cäsar Gläser.

Gläser, Gerulf Pannach, and Christiane Ufholz. She was on stage with him again at the concert for Klaus Renft's 60th birthday and the 40th anniversary of the Leipzig Beatdemo in October 2005. On 21 November 2006, she attended his funeral and performed with Hans-Jürgen Beyer, the Renftband, and Cäsar's Spieler at Klaus Renft's memorial concert.

From 2002 to 2009, Ufholz worked with the Jonathan Blues Band and regularly performed concerts again. In 2004, she retired from hairdressing. From 2009 onwards, Christiane Ufholz mainly performed with guitarist Eberhard Klunker.

On New Year's morning 2023, she was found dead in her Berlin apartment. Ufholz was 75 years old. She is survived by a son.
