= Stec =

Stec or STEC may refer to:

- Shigatoxigenic Escherichia coli, bacterial strains
- sTec, Inc., solid-state data storage company based in Santa Ana, California
- Daewoo S-TEC engine
- Stec (surname)
