= Petra Lux =

German civil rights activist and journalist

- Born: 1956 (age 69–70); Hermsdorf, Thuringia, East Germany
- Education: Karl-Marx-Universität Leipzig
- Occupations: Civil rights activist, journalist, novelist, tai chi teacher, qigong teacher
- Writing career
- Years active: 1980s-present
- Period: Post-Wende
- Genre: Novel
- Movement: Neues Forum

Petra Lux (born 1956 in Hermsdorf, Thuringia) is a German civil rights activist, journalist, novelist, tai chi and qigong teacher.

== Biography ==
Petra Lux grew up in a Catholic family and studied Journalism at the Karl-Marx-Universität Leipzig from 1976 to 1980. As a journalist she saw no opportunity in the GDR to realize her ideals, so she became involved as a director of "Jörgen Schmidtchen" in Leipzig-Schönefeld, a youth clubhouse for difficult youngsters, organizing events including literary evenings with non-conformist artists like Franz Fühmann and Wolfgang Hilbig as well as singer-songwriters whose lyrics offered critical perspectives. She also founded the first women’s center to be housed within a state-run cultural center in the GDR and—in another first for a cultural institution in the country—organized dance evenings for same-sex couples. She was then summarily dismissed in 1983.

Subsequently, discussion groups and underground concerts were held in their living quarters and her husband's workshop, featuring artists who took a critical stance toward the SED dictatorship—among them, Peter Gläser, Radjo Monk, Jürgen B. Wolff, Joachim Schäfer and Dieter Kalka. She made her private photo lab available for the production of critical materials.

On 3 October 1989 Petra Lux joined the Neues Forum (New Forum) and was among other roles its spokeswoman. She was a co-signatory of the call of the New Forum of 12 October 1989: "We demand immediate, here and now, public, equal dialogue ...".

1990–91 she worked as a journalist for women's issues at the DAZ (Die Andere Zeitung/The Other Newspaper) and then again as a freelance author for print and broadcast media as well as the Leipziger Dokumentar- und Kurzfilmfestival (Leipzig Documentary and Short Film Festival).

Shortly before the turn she came into contact with Asian movement and therapeutic practices; she studied family constellation work—including under Bert Hellinger —and completed training as a Tai Chi instructor. Since 1995, she has been offering her own courses in Tai Chi, Qigong, Reiki, and family constellation work, as well as giving lectures on runes, at her YINYANG Center in Leipzig, whose 20th anniversary was celebrated on 6 September 2015.

== Books ==
- (as author) Die Zeit der Schmetterlinge. Eine unendliche Biografie. ("The Time of the Butterflies." An Endless Biography) Roman. Vega Verlag, 2005, ISBN 3-9808919-8-4.
- as an author together with Erica Fischer: Ohne uns ist kein Staat zu machen. DDR-Frauen nach der Wende. ("Nothing can be achieved without us." GDR women after the reunification) Kiepenheuer & Witsch, 1995, ISBN 3-462-02057-9.
