= German–Polish Poets' Steamer =

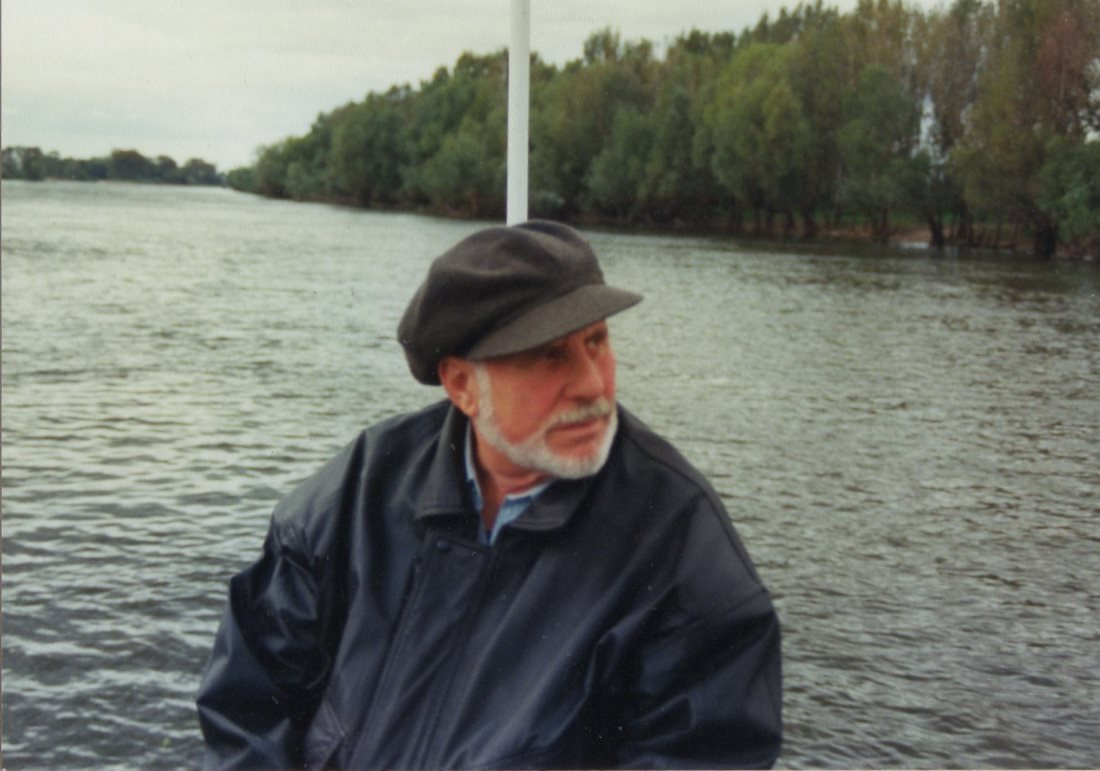
Poets steamer captain Hans Häußler on deck

The German–Polish Poets' Steamer (Polish: Statek Literacki, German: Deutsch-Polnischer Poetendampfer) was a literary event on several ships that took place under the direction of skipper Hans Häußler together with German and Polish poets annually for 10 days from 1995 to 1999 in September between Szczecin and Görlitz/Breslau.

== History ==
The "Poland plan" of Erich Loest, chairman of the German Writers Association, included the poetry festival "word lust" in Saxony. In Brandenburg Hans Häußler founded the project "German–Polish Poets' Steamer" in cooperation with the NGL (New Society of Literature Berlin), ORB (Radio Brandenburg) and the Polish Writers Union. along with skipper Hans Haussler.

Within this project smaller events happened with authors, translators, journalists, actors and politicians on the ship, more events took place in the surrounding villages – between Szczecin, Zielona Góra, Wrocław, Frankfurt/Oder and Görlitz. One highlight was the Poets wedding between the Leipzig Songwriter Dieter Kalka and the Grünberger fairy tale author Agnieszka Haupe at the Frankfurt Oderbrücke in 1998.

Locally founded poetic communities emerged and created an artist's book, which was then auctioned off with the proceeds benefitting the flood victims. Another project on the ship was, for example, the „literary bed“ – where two Polish and two German lyricist translated each other's writings. Each journey on ship had 50 to 80 participants. All authors were invited with accommodations either on the ship or at a hotel.

== High water / Low water ==
In 1997, when the drive was jeopardized due to flood, the Polish water protection authorities presented their inspection vessel 'Warta 3', and when in 1998, the ride because of money and lack of water has been a problem, the Wrocław Water Authority offered the barge Kosciuszko, named after go to the Polish national heroes Tadeusz Kosciuszko, for the project and also opened the floodgates to allow the river Oder had enough water depth.

== Participants ==
Tadeusz Różewicz Henryk Bereska, Andrzej Szczypiorski, Bohdan Zadura, Józef Baran, Izabela Filipiak, Bettina Wöhrmann, Urszula Małgorzata Benka, Marek Śnieciński, Marta Fox, Bohdan Kos, Renata Maria Niemierowska, Kurt Biedenkopf, Andreas Johannes Painta, Georg Oswald Cott, Anna Janko, Dieter Kalka, Maciej Cisło, Manfred Krug, Władysław Klepka, Urszula Kozioł, Stefan Chwin Hanna Krall, Julian Kornhauser, Adam Krzeminski, Agnieszka Haupe, Jolanta Pytel, Ludmiła Marjańska, Gabriela Matuszek, Jan Strządała, Róza Domascyna, Christa Wolf, Andrzej Stasiuk, José Pablo Quevedo, and others.

== Publications ==
- Oderbuch – Ksiega Odry / 5. Deutsch-Polnischer Poetendampfer / 5. Polsko-Niemiecko Statek Literacki (published by Sigrid Pohl-Häußler, Ewa Maria Slaska), Berlin, 1999
- Poetendampfer 97 (Unikate Oderbuch/Artist's book, unique), (published by Sigrid Pohl-Häußler, Ewa Maria Slaska), Neue Gesellschaft für Literatur Berlin, 1997
- Anthology Lubliner Lift / Lubelska winda 1998, Lublin/Dresden, resulting adaptations and texts from the Festival "word lust" and the poet steamer

== Media and film ==
- "And the ship floats on," the 45-minute doc film by Janusz Kijowski about the poet steamer was on German television (ZDF / RBB) and aired several times on Polish television
- 4th German-Polish poets steamer 1998: 230 press releases, 30 radio reports, 9 TV programs, reports in Belgian and Peruvian media
