= Häussler =

Häussler, Häußler or Haussler is a surname of German origin. Notable people with the surname include:

- David Haussler (born 1953), American bioinformatician
- Ernst Häussler (1914–1979), German SS officer
- Hans Häußler (1931-2010), German journalist, painter, musician, comedian, director and author of radio plays
- Heinrich Haussler (born 1984), Australian cyclist
- Heinz Häussler (born 1940), German gymnast
- Iris Häussler (born 1962), Canadian artist
- Joe Haussler (1902-1989), American politician
- Richard Häussler (1908–1964), German actor and film director
- Tim Häußler (born 1997, German footballwe

== See also ==
- Häusler, a surname
