= Wolfgang Scheffler =

Wolfgang Scheffler may refer to:

- Wolfgang Scheffler (historian) (1929–2008), German historian
- Wolfgang Scheffler (inventor) (born 1956), Austrian inventor
- Wolfgang Scheffler, German pianist from Lift
