= Agnieszka Haupe-Kalka =

Polish writer (born 1970)

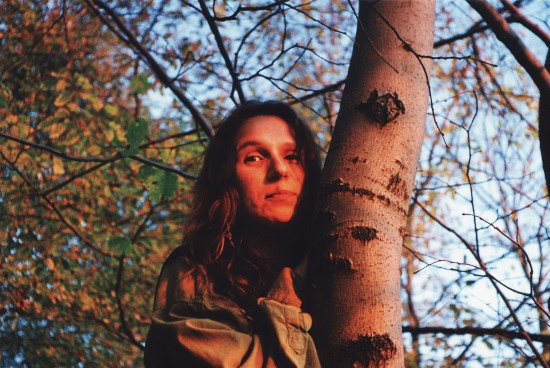
Agnieszka Haupe-Kalka, Photo: Dieter Kalka

Agnieszka Haupe-Kalka (born 13 June 1970 in Zielona Góra) is a Polish fairy tale poet, game designer and translator.

== Biography ==
She is the granddaughter of the resistance fighters of "AK Jemioły" and Auschwitz/Buchenwald survivor Maria Haupe (alias "Black Lady") and Wacław Haupe (alias "Młody szofer").

As a member of the Literary Society "Die Huelle" she was a co-organizer of the festival Grochowice '93 it the tenth anniversary of the death of Edward Stachura. In 1994 the Literary Society was awarded the prize of the Mayor of Zielona Góra.

1996 and 1998 she was a participant in the German-Polish poets steamer, where she met the German singer-songwriter Dieter Kalka and married on 12 September 1998 in Frankfurt (Oder) ("Poets wedding").

With Jolanta Pytel, Katarzyna Jarosz-Rabiej and Władysław Klępka she founded in 1995 the "Association of the still living poets" in Zielona Góra and co-organized the "Uniwersytet poezji" (1995–1998), a participant in the German-Polish poetry festival "word lust" in Lublin in 1997 and worked on the publication of the anthology "Lublin Lift/Lubelska winda". With Dieter Kalka they founded the project: "Children invent tales", took part in the radio drama festival in Rust (Austria) with the radio play "mirror images of two languages" part. Prose and poetry in the German language have been published in Ostragehege Nos. 9 and on Portal Poland.

Agnieszka Haupe developed board and other games and participated in the games fair in Göttingen. From 1996 to 2005 she lived in Leipzig/Germany and Zielona Góra/Poland, studied 2005/2006 German studies at the University of Zielona Góra and has lived in County Kerry/Ireland since of 2006. Her texts have been translated into English and German.

== Works ==
- Krajobrazy czułego dotyku / The Landscapes of tender touch. Poetry. Organon, Zielona Góra 2010, ISBN 978-83-87294-60-1 (Polish – English).
- Skrzydła wiatru. Poetry. Poddasze Poetów, Zielona Góra 1999, ISBN 83-88059-40-8.
- Pradawne Pieśni. Prose. ProLibris, Zielona Góra 2009, ISBN 978-83-88336-70-6.
- Żywe oczy wiersza / Augen des Gedichts, anthology, Polish-German, publisher Jolanta Pytel and Czesław Sobkowiak, Organon Zielona Góra 2001, ISBN 83-87294-25-X.

== Bibliography ==
- Danuta Piekarska: Buchhalter pisze wiersze. In: Gazeta Lubuska. 27./28. June 1998.
- Bahaidzi z rzeki. In: Gazeta Lubuska. 14. September 1998.
- Rejs do Szczecina. In: Kurier Szczeciński. 17. September 1998.
- Marta Fox: Jak korek na fali ... In: Śląsk. Nr 11/13, 1996.
- Feuerlöscher und Hydrant, 3 1/2 fairy tales, with Dieter Kalka, Edition Beulenspiegel, AndreBuchverlag, Lengenfeld 2023, ISBN 978-3949143243.
- Afront, Oświęcim. Auschwitz. 13 wizyt, prose, translation by Agnieszka Haupe, Bukowno 2022.
- Bronisław Słomka: Błędni rycerze. In: Gazeta Lubuska. 2./3. November 1996.
- Katarzyna Jarosz-Rabiej: Statkiem Literackim. In: Gazeta Lubuska. Komunikaty Nr 6, 1996, S. 15.
- Polish Bibliography
- Polish poetry from Zielona Góra podcast
