= Carr index =

Indicator of the compressibility of a powder

The Carr index (Carr's index or Carr's Compressibility Index) is an indicator of the compressibility of a powder. It is named after the scientist Ralph J. Carr, Jr.

The Carr index is calculated by the formula $C=100\frac{\rho_T-\rho_B}{\rho_T}$, where $\rho_B$ is the freely settled bulk density of the powder, and $\rho_T$ is the tapped bulk density of the powder after "tapping down". It can also be expressed as $C=100(1-\rho_B/\rho_T)$.

The Carr index is frequently used in pharmaceutics as an indication of the compressibility of a powder. In a free-flowing powder, the bulk density and tapped density would be close in value, therefore, the Carr index would be small. On the other hand, in a poor-flowing powder where there are greater interparticle interactions, the difference between the bulk and tapped density observed would be greater, therefore, the Carr index would be larger. A Carr index greater than 25 is considered to be an indication of poor flowability, and below 15, of good flowability.

Another way to measure the flow of a powder is the Hausner ratio, which can be expressed as $H=\rho_T/\rho_B$.

Both the Hausner ratio and the Carr index are sometimes criticized, despite their relationships to flowability being established empirically, as not having a strong theoretical basis. Use of these measures persists, however, because the equipment required to perform the analysis is relatively cheap and the technique is easy to learn.

== General Bibliography ==
Mark Gibson (2001). Pharmaceutical Preformulation and Formulation: A Practical Guide from Candidate Drug Selection to Commercial Dosage Form. Boca Raton: CRC Press. ISBN 1-57491-120-1.
