= Marek Śnieciński =

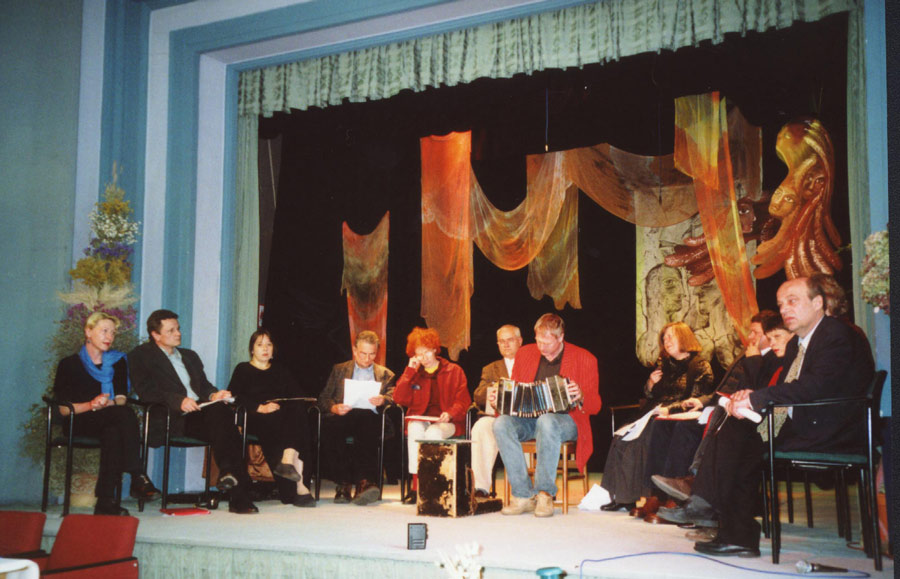
Marek Śnieciński, 2.v.l., Orpheus-Group in Zgorzelec/Poland

Marek Śnieciński (born 1958 in Wrocław) is a Polish poet, narrator, essayist, art critic, curator, documentary and translator German and English literature.

== Biography ==
Marek Śnieciński graduated from the University of Wrocław (subject History 1982, Art History 1986, Philology 1980/81). Since 1988 he works at the Institute of Art History at the University of Wrocław, where he gives lectures on contemporary art and photography. 2001-2002 he was the artistic director of the Photography Academy in Wrocław. In 2009 he defended his thesis on "German Photography of the 90s of the XX. Century. Photos Ideen". He has published over 100 articles on problems of the photograph of the XX. Century in Poland, Germany, Austria and Slovakia, edited some 20 catalogs and has curated several dozen exhibitions in the gallery the Prater Photographers from Breslau and the Galerie Pankow Polish Photography, Jerzy Lewczynski.

Marek Śnieciński was participant in the German-Polish poets steamer, the German-Polish Poetry Festival "wortlust" in 1997 Lublin and the Orpheus project in Wroclaw, Bad Muskau and Lwówek Śląski and at the "Literarisches Bett/Literary bed" in Ochsenwang (with Marta Fox, Tina Stroheker and Dieter Kalka). His texts have been published in literary magazines in Germany, Austria, the Slovakia and Poland. They were translated into German by Bettina Wöhrmann, Peter Gehrisch, Tina Stroheker and Dieter Kalka. Marek Śnieciński is a member of Wolfgang Hilbig-Gesellschaft Leipzig. Marek Śnieciński lives in Wroclaw.

== Works ==
=== Poetry and Prose ===
- „Droga na wzgórze”, Wrocław 1996
- „Coitus sacralis”, Poznań 2000
- „Jak cię milczeć”, Warszawa 2004
- „Od Ewy do Marii Magdaleny. Szkice o kobietach w Biblii”, Wrocław 1997
- "Poemat o pamięci i inne wiersze", Poetry

=== Translations ===
- Dieter Kalka, „Wszystko to tylko teatr”, Poznań 1999, Prose
- Peter Gehrisch „Zraniony słowem wers”, Warszawa 2001, Poetry
- „Orfeusz - rozmowa w słowie / Orpheus - Gespräch im Wort”, Dresden 2001, translation and redaction
- Undine Materni, „die tage kommen über den fluss/ dni przekraczają rzekę", tikkun, Warschau, 2006, bilingual edition, ISBN 83-85683-38-0
- „Orfeusz – Podróz do zródel granic“, Klodzko, Osrodek Kultury, 1999
- „Amerykańscy prezydenci : 41 historycznych portretów od Jerzego Waszyngtona do Billa Clintona", Wrocław 1999, American presidents, political essays

=== Movies for Polish television (selection) ===
- „Galeria ef”
- „Poza czasem” (about the work of Wroclaw artist Jan Jaromir Aleksiun)
- „Odsłanianie ukrytych wymiarów” (about the creation of the glass artist Stanisław Borowski)
- „Eugeniusz Get Stankiewicz” (Documentation )
- „Jacek Łukasiewicz” (Documentation in the cycle "The Master“)
