= Viktar Shalkevich =

Belarusian singer, writer and actor

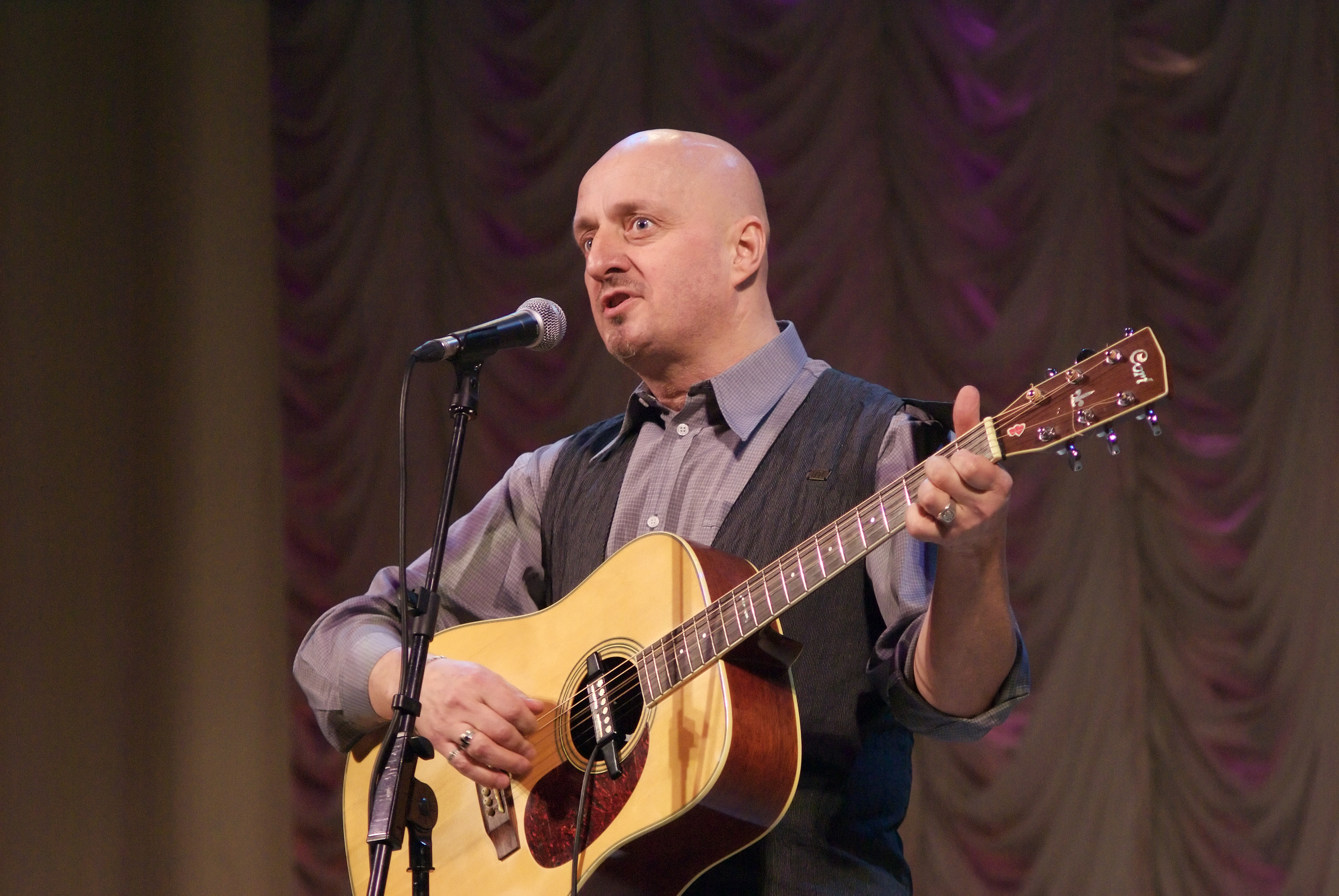
Viktar Shalkevich during a concert, 2010

Viktar Shalkevich during a concert in Warsaw, March 25, 2012

Viktar Antonavich Shalkevich (born February 9, 1959, in Porazava; Belarusian: Віктар Антонавіч Шалкевіч, Viktar Antonavič Šalkievič, Polish: Wiktor Antonawicz Szałkiewicz, Russian: Виктор Антонович Шалкевич) is a Belarusian actor, poet and singer-songwriter.

== Biography ==
Shalkevich was born in 1959 in Porazava near Grodno in the Socialist Byelorussian Soviet Republic. He grew up surrounded by three cultures: the Belarusian, Polish and Yiddish. He graduated from the State Theatre Institute in 1980. Until 1991, he was an actor at the Grodno City Theatre, and since 1991, he has worked at Grodno Puppet Theater.

Shalkevich is an actor, poet and bard. Since his school days, he writes songs and performs them. He has performed in Belarus, Czech Republic, France, Lithuania, Germany (at Waldeck Castle), Poland and Russia. His texts have been translated into English, German, Polish, Ukrainian and Czech. He played the lead role in the films Slozy błudnogo syna (Tears of the Prodigal Son) and Sładkij jad lubwi (The sweet poison of love). His songs are very personal, full of sarcasm, irony and sadness over unfulfilled hopes and despite lofty themes he comes without pathos. During his performances he responds spontaneously and unpredictably.

== Awards ==
- Order of the Smile
- Winner of the Grand Prix festival Basovišča 1992
- Grand Prix of the festival "Jesień Bardow / Autumn of Bard in 1992"
- Winner of the festival "Pieśni Autorskiej ORRA"
- Nomination for the "Wydarzenie festiwalu"
- Winner was the Grand Prix National Competition "the arrival of the bard 2005"
- Winner of the Grand Prix National Polish Competition "Przybycie Bardow"

== Discography ==
- Niewidoczny mur/Unsichtbare Mauer 1999, Concert in Minsk, together with Ales Kamocki, Szymon Zychowicz and Dieter Kalka.
- Prawincyja 1992.
- Smutny biełaruski bluz/Sad Belarusian Blues/Смутны беларускі блюз 1996.
- Bałady i ramansy/Балады і рамансы, „Charter 97", 1998.
- Dobraj ranicy/Добрай раніцы, 2002.
- За сто крокаў ад Вострае Брамы, 2003.
- Haradzieniec pryziamliusia u Minsku/Live in Minsk/Гарадзенец прызямліўся ў Менску 2006.
- Światy Mikałaj (at the album Światy wieczar 2000).
- Jołaczka (at Dni latuć. Pieśni z-za kratau), „BMAGroup", 2005.
- New songs and anecdotes, „BMAGroup", 2009.
- Viktar Šalkievič, “uCentry”, 2019.

== Theatrical performances ==
- Плач перапёлкі
- Атрад
- Łzy syna marnotrawnego /Сьлёзы блуднага сына (main role)
- Słodka trucizna miłości /Салодкі яд каханьня (main role)
- Tutejsi/ Тутэйшыя

== Literature ==
- Д.П. (2008). "Шалкевіч Віктар (Шалкевич Виктор, Shalkevich Viktar)". Энцыклапедыя беларускай папулярнай музыкі. уклад. Дз. Падбярэзскі і інш (2000 экз ed.). Мінск: Zmicier Kołas. pp. 334–335. ISBN 978-985-6783-42-8.
