= Karussell =

German rock band

- Origin: Leipzig, Germany
- Genres: Rock
- Years active: 1976–1991, 2007–present
- Label: Monopol
- Members: Wolf-Rüdiger Raschke; Joe Raschke; Reinhard Huth; Jan Kirsten; Benno Jähnert; Moritz Pachale
- Past members: Peter Gläser; Jochen Hohl; Lutz Kirsten; Claus Winter; Bernd Schumacher; Bernd Dünnebei; Tom Leonhardt; Lutz Salzwedel; Dirk Michaelis; Jürgen Hofmeister; Larry B; Ali Zieme; Frank Endrik Moll; Hans Graf; Jens Legler
- Website: karussell-rockband.de

Karussell is a German rock band from Leipzig formed in 1976. The group is one of the well-known East German bands.

== History ==
The group was founded in April 1976. Their first album Entweder oder was released in 1979. They have released 9 albums to date, with loslassen being released in 2011. The group had a string of hits in East Germany in the 1980s, among them Wer die Rose ehrt, Ehrlich will ich bleiben, Autostop and especially Als ich fortging, which is often regarded as one of the most popular songs in the history of East Germany.

== Discography ==
- 1979: Entweder oder
- 1980: Das einzige Leben
- 1982: Schlaraffenberg
- 1984: Was kann ich tun
- 1987: Cafe Anonym
- 1990: Solche wie du
- 1994: Sonnenfeuer
- 2002: Eigentlich geht's uns gut
- 2011: loslassen
- 2018: Earth wind
- 2024: Under the Stars
