= Hausner =

Hausner is a surname. Notable people with the surname include:

- Bernard Hausner (1874–1938), Polish rabbi, politician, and diplomat
- Gideon Hausner (1915–1990), Israeli jurist and politician
- Jerzy Hausner (born 1949), Polish politician and economist
- Jessica Hausner (born 1972), Austrian film director and screenwriter
- Krzysztof Hausner (born 1944), Polish football right-wing forward
- Rudolf Hausner (1914–1995), Austrian painter, draughtsman, printmaker and sculptor
- Siegfried Hausner (1952–1975), student member of the German Socialist Patients' Collective and later the Red Army Faction

== See also ==
- Hausner ratio, number that is correlated to the flowability of a powder or granular material
