= Chanson days Kloster Michaelstein =

The GDR-open Chanson days Kloster Michaelstein had a meeting a majority of critical singer-songwriter and folklorist in Michaelstein Abbey, where "everyone was asked to sing his song."

== Story ==
The GDR-open Chanson days in Kloster Michaelstein began as a private initiative of Wolfgang Schlemminger. He invited songs people to the monastery, where he served as timpanist. In the summer he worked on the construction of the destroyed monastery and in the evening he sang around the campfire with guests. Starting in 1977, took over Werner Bernreuther the Chanson days as artistic director until the end of 1992. The mid-80s the Chanson days were moved to Langeln. The last time they were 1992 in Wernigerode.

== Claim ==
Werner Bernreuther wanted as artistic director, "that the Chanson days Kloster Michaelstein is an oasis for songs people among themselves". As Deputy Chairman of the Section Chanson and Songwriter at the General Committee for entertainment art of the GDR, responsible for education and training and a member of the Central Honorary Commission he was in the sub-district hierarchy the man from Berlin: "The opinion is made in Berlin. And I was from Berlin. That was the game. And I must say, the game has also been funny." In Kloster Michaelstein "everybody was allowed to sing his song".

== Expiration ==
The Chanson days were primarily a workshop meeting with mostly amateur musicians, with a considerable number of them later prizes at the National Chanson days received and joined the professional status. During the day at present lecturers different workshop seminars (text, song, stage behavior, instrument) were held in the evening there was the song contest in Klosterkeller (cellar of the monastir), similar to that of his time at the castle Wartburg. For the three public events included an example of each concert and a final concert in the refectory as well as a children's program.

== Decomposition measures by the Stasi ==
Major Ulrich Kolbe (Code name Werner Weber) collected from 1984 extensive material and drew up plans "operational intrusion for the purpose ... and prosecution of anti-state people ...". For him, the majority of participants were enemies of the state."

== Subsequent award winners at the National Chanson days ==
were Hubertus Schmidt, Susanne Grütz, Joachim Schäfer, Stephan Krawczyk, Juergen B. Wolff, Dieter Beckert, Dieter Kalka, Ilona Schlott, Piatkowski & Rieck, Stephan König, Norbert Bischoff and other
