= Andrzej Pańta =

Polish-German poet and translator

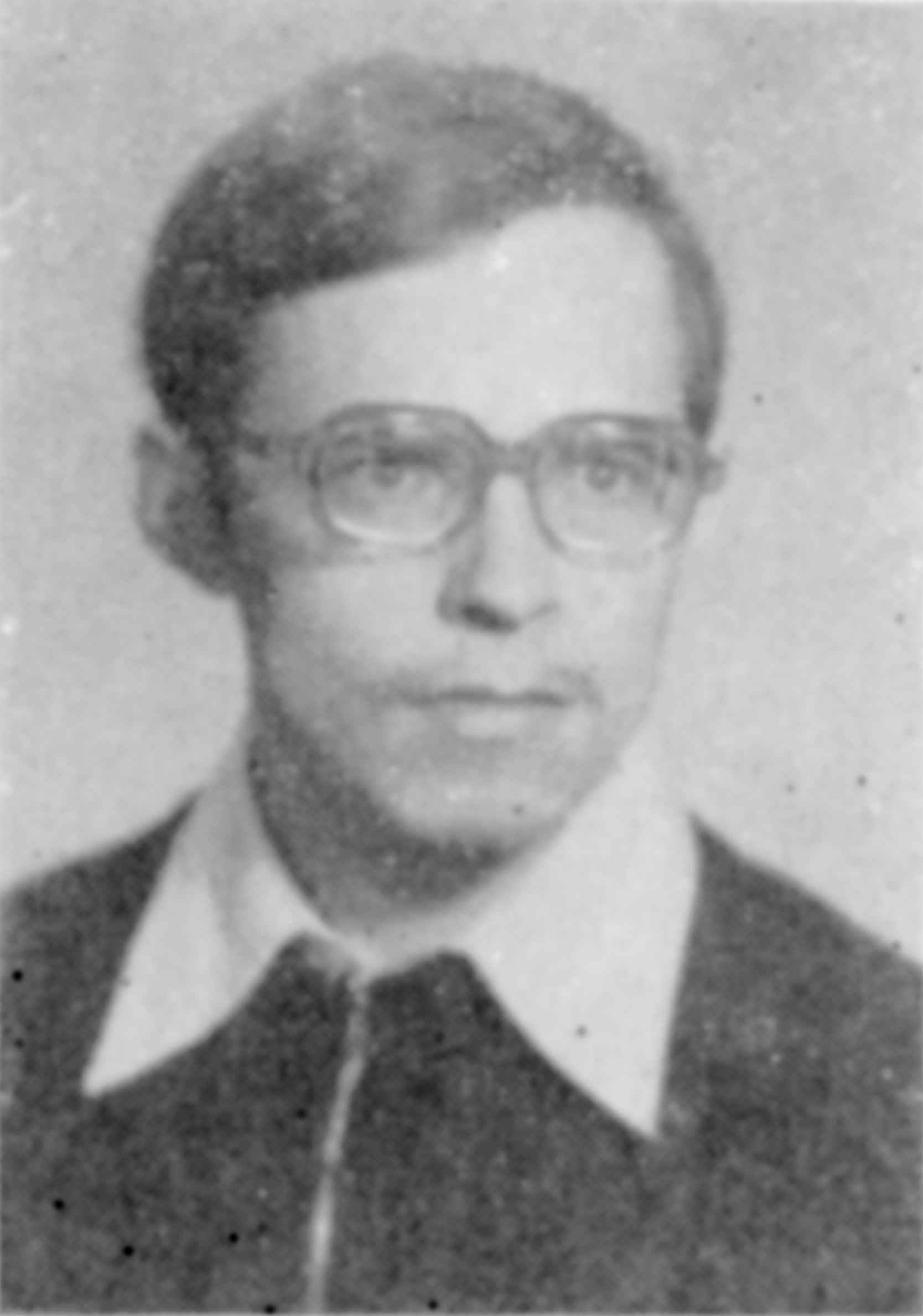
Andrzej Panta

Andrzej Pańta (also Andreas Johannes Painta, born April 10, 1954, in Bytom, Poland, died February 8, 2024 in Görlitz, Germany) is a Polish-German poet and translator of German literature.

== Biography ==
Painta studied Polish philology and biology at the University of Silesia in Katowice and made his debut in 1973 with poetry in the magazine Poglądy. He has published in Polish literary journals such as Arkadia, Portret, Śląsk, Kresy, Poezja, Integracja, Kultura and Nowy wyraz, Fa Style, List oceaniczny, Wyrazy, format and Fraza. He took part in the German-Polish poets steamer (Deutsch-Polnischer Poetendampfer) in 1998 and 1999, the festival Fortalicje in Zamość, the German-Polish Poetry Festival "wortlust" in Lublin 1997 and the Uniwersytet poezjii in Zielona Góra. He translated German writers and philosophers into Polish, among them Friedrich Hölderlin, Horst Bienek, Arthur Schopenhauer, Rose Ausländer, Jakob Böhme, Erik Blumenthal, Dieter Kalka and Alfred Georg Seidel. Andrzej Pańta lives in Görlitz, Germany.

== Books of poetry ==
- Wyspa na jeziorze, Katowice 1977
- Counter-revolution, 1989
- Pan, Synchrones Poem, 1992
- Nic więcej, 1995
- Bez; ogródek, 1995
- Wieczna naiwność wróżek, 1985
- Za płotem, 1981
- Brzuchem do słońca, 1986
- Pneuma culi, 1988

=== Translation ===
- Friedrich Hölderlin, Fale nieba, poetry, 1991
- Horst Bienek, Czas po temu, 1987
- Horst Bienek, Stopniowe zadławianie krzyku i inne eseje, Essays, 2001
- Arthur Schopenhauer: Metafizyka miłości płciowej, 1985
- Rose Ausländer: W kotle czarownic, 1995
- Jakob Böhme: O nowych, powtórnych narodzinach, 1993
- Jakob Böhme: Aurora, Letters, Zgorzelec 1999
- Jacob Böhme, Teozoficzne okólniki, Zgorzelec 2005
- Erik Blumenthal, Uwierzyć w samego siebie. Samozaufanie płynące z głębi/ An sich selber Glauben. Selbstvertrauen aus der Tiefe, Gdańsk 1998
- E. Blumenthal: Uwierzyć w samego siebie, Gdańsk 1998
- Dieter Kalka: Podwójne i potrójne, Bydgoszcz 1999
- Alfred Georg Seidel, Niebo nad granicami, Gliwice 2001

== Prizes ==
- Kryształowy Lew. Kłodzka Wiosna Poetycka 1974
- Nagrod "Pegaza" - za przekład poezji/ Pegasus Prize for translation of poetry (1992)
- Laureat nagrody im. Tadeusza Peipera
- Nagroda Czerwonej Róży w Gdańsku, 1990
- Stypendium, Fundacja Pomocy Niezależnej Nauce i Literaturze Polskiej/ Scholarship, Foundation for Independent Polish Science and Literature, Paris 1991
- Preis der Künstlergilde Esslingen 2000, German Prize of the "Künstlergilde"

== Bibliography ==
- Jerzy Pluta: Życie na białym papierze. „Odra" 1978/4
- Janusz Leppek: By pióro nie spało. „Radar” 1978/6
- Andrzej K. Waśkiewicz: Debiuty poetyckie 1977. Antologia. W: „Debiuty poetyckie ’77”. Warszawa 1978
- Bolesław Niezgoda: Andrzej Pańta laureatem nagrody im. Tadeusza Peipera. „Nasze problemy” 1979/42
- Tadeusz Złotorzycki: Oryginalność i sztampa. „Nowe Książki" 1980/22
- Marek Pytasz: Kaleki alfabet Andrzeja Pańty. „Poglądy” 1981/19
- Stanisław Muc: Świat dla poety jest chaosem. „Radar” 1983/9
- Stanisław Piskor: Nałóg poetycki. „Tak i Nie” 1984/26
- Stanisław Muc: Chorałki i rozmowy z Panem. „Radar” 1984/41
- Emil Biela: Chorałki i rozmowy. „Tygodnik Kulturalny” 1984/44
- Krzysztof Kuczkowski: Duchowy dowód osobisty. „Okolice” 1984/12-12
- Marian Kisiel: Przewrotny transcendentalizm. „Radar” 1986/20
- Maciej M. Szczawiński: Brzuchem do słońca. „Tak i Nie” 1986/36
- Tadeusz Złotorzycki: Wieczna przewrotność wróżek. „Nowe Książki” 1986/12
- Ryszard Bednarczyk: Andrzej Pańta: Wiek gladiatorów. „Tak i Nie” 1987/21
- Horst Bienek: Reise in die Kindheit. München 1988
- Jan Korpys: Wzajemności. „Regiony“ 1989/3
- Andrzej Lazarowicz: W świecie chaos i w nas. „Słowo Powszechne" 1989/131
- Andrzej Burzyński: Pars pro toto — Część za całość? „Biuletyn Związku Górnośląskiego” 1990/2
- Marian Kisiel: Poeci na Śląsku: Andrzej Pańta. „Górnośląski Diariusz Kulturalny” 1994/1-2
- Marianna Bocian: O tragedii ocalającej całego człowieka. „Opcje” 1995/1-2
- Jerzy Suchanek: Napaść wspomnień. „Gliwicki Magazyn Kulturalny”. Kwiecień 1995
- Jerzy Pluta: Eseje Horsta Bienka. „Przecinek” 2001/12
- Krzysztof Karwat: Inna twarz Bienka. „Dziennik Zachodni” 2001/170

== Interviews ==
- Czerpanie z dna (Abgrundu). Z jednym z najbardziej interesujących i fascynujących poetów / Conversation with one of the most interesting and fascinating poets: With Andrzej Panta speaks Bogusław Sławomirski. „Gwarek” 1989/13.
- Raj utracony. Edward Szopa: Talk with Andrzej Pańta. „Życie” (Bytom). 1992/23.
- Dialektyka kosmosu. With Andrzej Pańta speaks Józef Górdziałek. "Opcje" 1995/1-2.
- Język, w jakim piszę i jaki mnie pisze. Jerzy Pluta: Talk with Andrzej Pańta, poet and translator, in „Przecinek” 2001/11.
- Prawo i bezprawie. With Andrzej Pańta speaks Bożena Budzińska
