= Werner Bernreuther =

German actor, musician and writer (1941–2024)

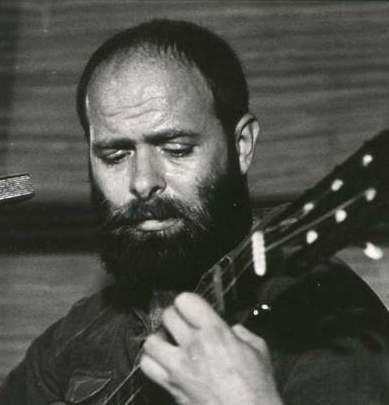
- Born: 6 December 1941; Sonneberg, Thuringia, Germany
- Died: 17 September 2024 (aged 82); Berlin, Germany

Werner Bernreuther (6 December 1941 – 17 September 2024) was a German actor, singer-songwriter, writer, poet, translator and painter.

== Biography ==
Bernreuther trained as an electrician, studied 1965–1969 at the Academy of Dramatic Art in Leipzig and was then committed to the stages Freiberg and Gera. Bernreuther received Chanson lessons from Heinrich Pohle and Fania Fénelon. At the 4th Chanson days of the GDR, he was awarded the prize of the Writers' Union of the German Democratic Republic. Bernreuther sings partly in his native Itzgründisch dialect and mixed "folk song-like structure with intellectual thinking." In the 1980s, he made radio and television productions, inter alia in Rund, Liedercircus '86, Pfundgrube und Liederkarussell. Bernreuther was abroad, inter alia in Romania on tour. He studied 1979–1982 at the Literature Institute in Leipzig and had since 1981 held a lectureship for Chanson at the University of Music and Theatre Leipzig and is part of the Leipziger songs scene. His adaptations of songs Bulat Okudzhavas appeared 1985. Bernreuther spent 15 years artistic director of the Chanson days Kloster Michaelstein and from 1984 in charge as deputy chairman of the "Section Chanson and Songwriter of the General Committee for entertainment art of the GDR" for training. In this capacity, he installed in 1986 a two-year course for Singer-Songwriter, consisting of 14-day intensive courses, the so-called "Songwriter-University of the GDR". Among the participants were Maike Nowak, Frank Viehweg, the songs company Dietze and Norbert Bischof. Bernreuther was also called a "guru of the East German singer-songwriters", because he like no other strove for the next generation of critical voices. His pupils include Hubertus Schmidt, Stephan Krawczyk, the group Liedehrlich, Dieter Kalka, Joachim Schäfer, Maike Nowak, Andrea Thelemann and Norbert Bischof. Today Bernreuther lives in Berlin.

== Works ==
=== Stage programs ===
- "Mit offenen Augen" – (Solo program on Tour) 1981
- "Lieder – Balladen – Geschichten" – (Solo program on Tour) 1983
- "Landläufige Gesänge" – (Solo program on Tour) 1985
- "Sehnsucht nach Heimweh"- (Solo program on Tour) 1988 /1989
- "Der Winter ist vergangen" (Together with the group "Liedehrlich")
- "Liederzirkus '86" – (together with "Circus Lila", Gerhard Schöne and others)

=== Translations of poetry ===
- Tschechische Chansons in: "Jungfer Lotty" Eulenspiegel-Verlag
- Songs of Bulat Okudschawa
- Songs of Zora Jandová from Czech for German TV
- Songs of Ivan Darvas from Hungarian for German TV

=== Vinyl and CD ===
- Sehnsucht nach Heimweh, 1989/99
- Mit offenen Augen, 1982
- Jungfer Lotty

=== Books ===
- Negerküsse in Zigeunersoße, Essay by Dieter Kalka with 12 drawings by Werner Bernreuther, Edition Beulenspiegel, AndreBuchVerlag, 2021 ISBN 9-783949-143045

=== Children's books ===
- Reimkramkiste, 1993
- Kotsch-Lasch-Kautschen-Pfff, 1994
- Piraten in der Badewanne, 1996

=== Plays ===
- Riesenspiel, 1995
- Und noch steht das Haus, 1996
- Leichenschmaus auf Probe, UA 1997 im Leipziger "Theater Fact"
- Der doppelte Hans, 1997
