= Stets =

Stets (Ukrainian: Стець) is a Ukrainian surname, literally meaning a diminutive of the given name Stepan. Notable people with the surname include:

- Marina Stets (born 1973), Belarusian tennis player
- Yuriy Stets (born 1975), Ukrainian journalist and politician
