= Lift (band) =

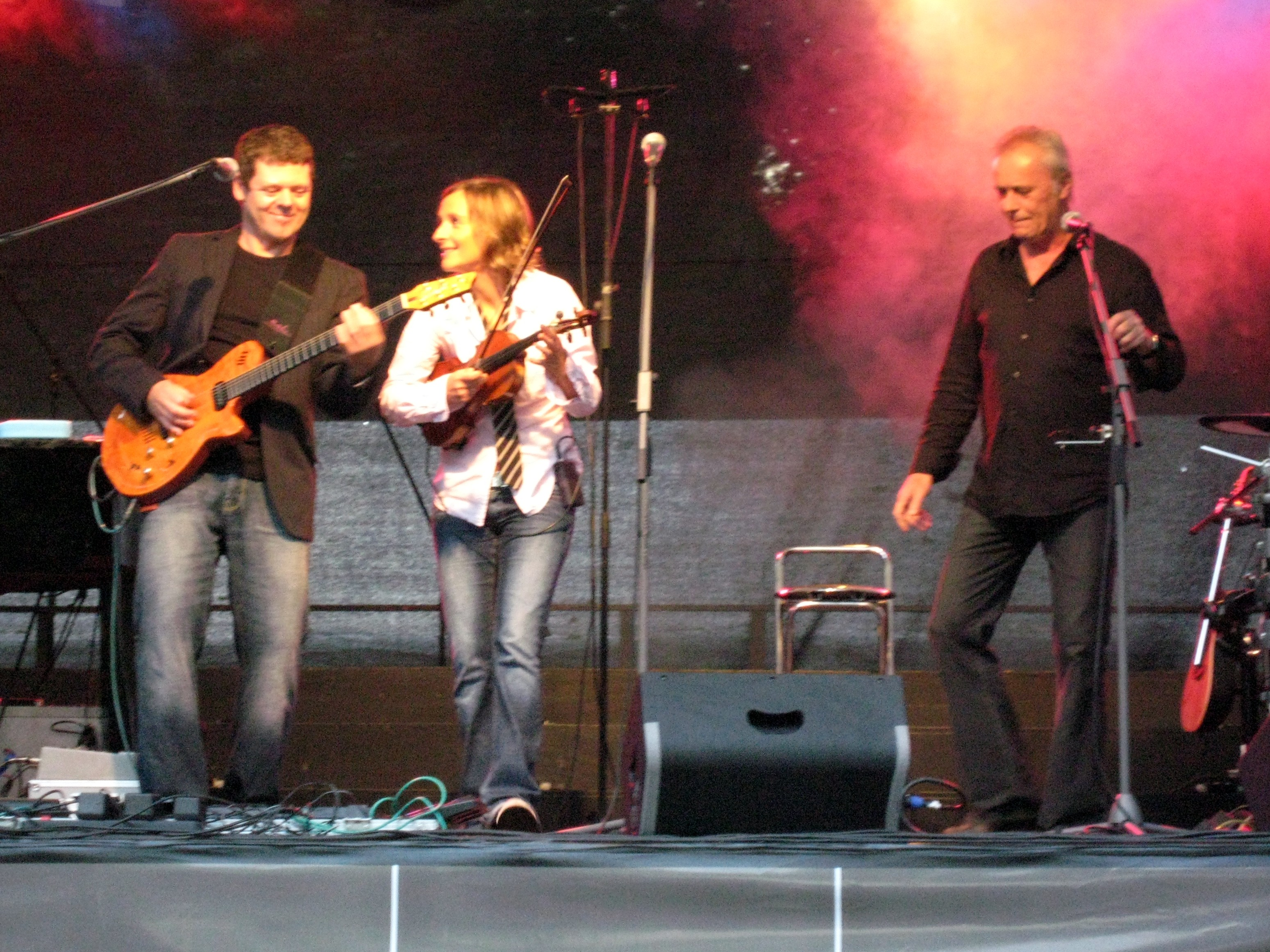

Background information
- Origin: Dresden, East Germany
- Genres: Art rock, jazz rock
- Years active: 1973–present
- Label: Amiga

Lift are a German rock band formed in Dresden in 1973 and remains active at the present day.

== History ==
The group was founded in 1973 following the dissolution of the group Dresden Sextett. Their first concert was given on January 28, 1973. The group underwent a series of lineup changes in its early years; of the group's early members, only Werther Lohse, who joined the group in 1974, is still a member. Their first album was released in 1977; shortly after this, members Henry Pacholski and Gerhard Zachar were killed in a traffic accident while touring in Poland. Two further LPs were issued in 1979 and 1981, after which time the group fell from fame. Their 1987 album is now something of a rarity.

After the fall of the Berlin Wall they toured the newly reunited Germany, playing often with the groups Electra and Stern-Combo Meißen. They continued to tour and record into the 2000s.

== Members ==
Founding members

- Gerhard Zachar - bass (died 1978)
- Konrad Burkert - drums
- Jürgen Heinrich - guitar
- Till Patzer - alto saxophone, transverse flute
- Manfred Nytsch - trombone
- Wolfgang Scheffler - keyboards
- Karl-Matthias Pflugbeil - trumpet
- Bernd Schlund - vocals
- Christiane Ufholz - vocals

Current members

- Werther Lohse - vocals, percussion (since 1974)
- Bodo Kommnick - guitar, vocals
- Yvonne Fechner - violin, vocals
- Peter Michailow - drums
- Jens Brüssow - bass

Former members

- Stephan Trepte - vocals (1973–75)
- Franz Bartzsch - keyboards, vocals (1973–74)
- Michael Heubach - keyboards (1974–1985)
- Henry Pacholski - vocals (1975–78; died 1978)
- Hans Wintoch - violin, keyboards, vocals (1984)

== Discography ==
=== LPs ===
- 1976: Lift (Amiga)
- 1979: Meeresfahrt (Amiga)
- 1981: Spiegelbild (Amiga)
- 1987: Nach Hause (Amiga)

=== CDs ===
- 1992: Rock aus Deutschland Ost 6 - Wasser und Wein
- 1994: Spiegelbild / Nach Hause
- 1995: Best of Lift
- 1995: Meine Schulden
- 1996: Die schönsten Balladen
- 1998/2003: LIFT classics
- 1999: Nach Süden
- 1999: Sachsendreier live (with electra and Stern-Combo Meißen)
- 2000: Lift
- 2000: Meeresfahrt
- 2000: Lift Unplugged
- 2003: Classics & unplugged
- 2005: Tagesreise – Best (1976–2003)
- 2007: Sachsendreier live – die Zweite (with electra and Stern-Combo Meißen)
- 2008: Hits & Raritäten (Buschfunk)

=== DVD ===
- 2005: Sachsendreier Live (with electra and Stern-Combo Meißen)
