= Laurel Hausler =

American painter

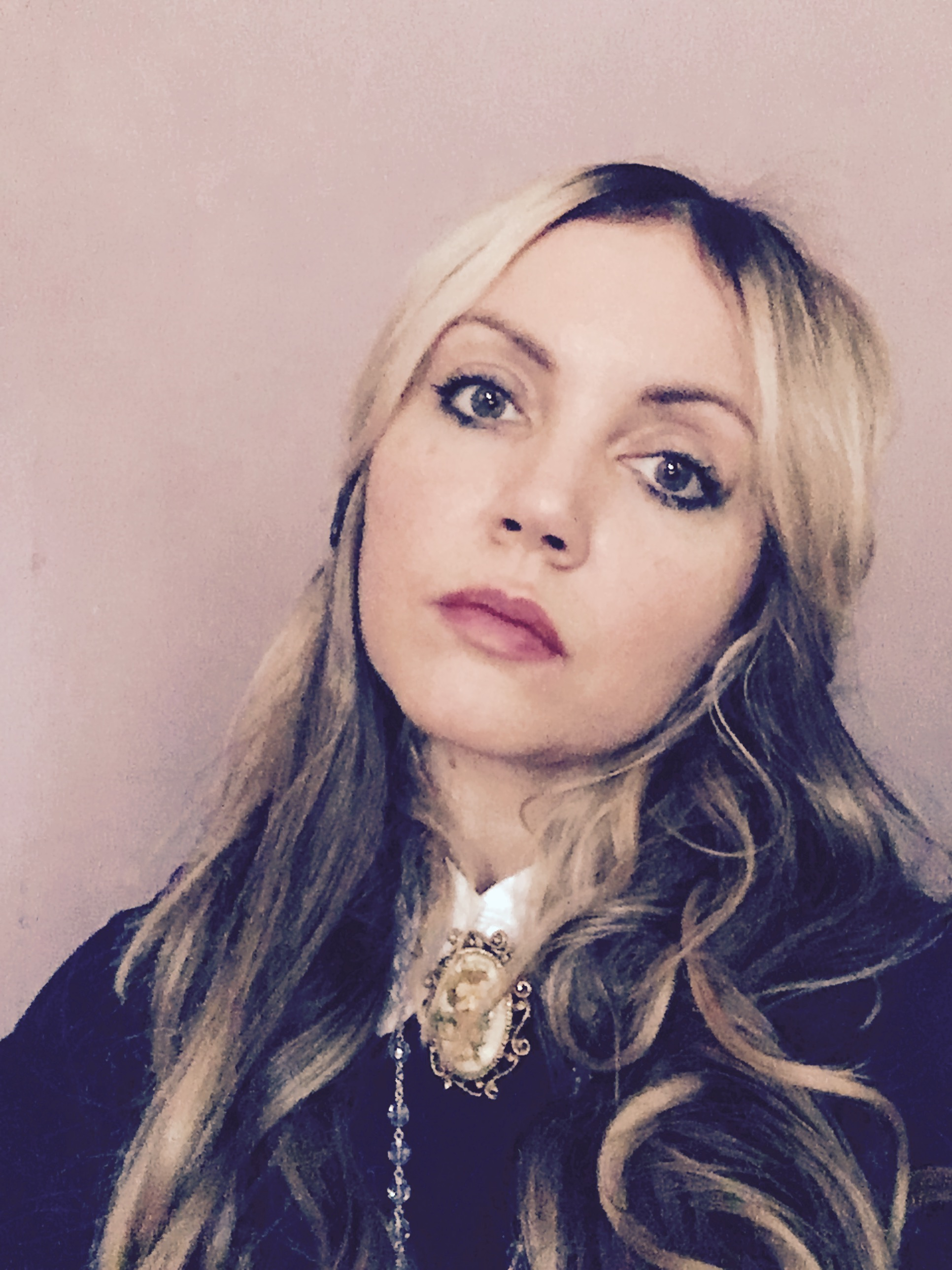
- Born: Fairfax, Virginia, United States
- Known for: Oil painting, sculpting
- Movement: Symbolism, Expressionism, Narrative
- Website: www.laurelhausler.com

Laurel Hausler is a contemporary oil painter and sculptor. Her work has been widely critiqued and her style compared to those of Joseph Cornell, Frida Kahlo, Edward Gorey and Francis Bacon. Her paintings reflect a woman's experience in a darkly humorous and chaotic world.

== Early life ==
Born in Fairfax, Virginia, Hausler began to paint seriously only after living in New Orleans in the late 1990s. She worked a number of different jobs before she became a professional artist. These positions included: journalist, zookeeper and tarot card reader.

== Works ==
Hausler's works are atmospheric, mysterious and narrative, relying heavily on imagery built upon her Catholic childhood, psychology and literature.

Influenced by the limits imposed in Catholic school and a general love of history, Hausler has developed her signature style by combining collage, found objects, drawing and painting. Though Hausler studied Literature at Gettysburg College, she declined academic artistic study and developed her own method of applying oil paint in many ghostly layers.

The artist follows a thread of expression begun by the Symbolists and continued by Expressionists such as Edvard Munch.

Hausler shows with galleries and museums across the United States, including Gallery in the Woods, located in Brattleboro, VT, and Morton Fine Art, located in the District of Columbia.

Writer Joyce Carol Oates remarked,

The haunting art of Laurel Hausler seems to hover, wraith-like, between two worlds.

=== Collaborations and illustrations ===
Hausler's painting "The Prairie at Night" makes the cover of musician Sarah White's album "Sweetheart".

Hausler has collaborated several times on covers for the work of Joyce Carol Oates and other horror and mystery writers. Notable works include:

- Cutting Edge: New Stories of Mystery and Crime by Women Writers, Akashic Books, edited by Joyce Carol Oates (cover and interior art by Laurel Hausler)
- A Darker Shade of Noir: New Stories of Body Horror by Women Writers, Akashic Books, edited by Joyce Carol Oates (cover and interior art by Laurel Hausler)
- Zombie – Suntup Publishing Special Edition, edited by Joyce Carol Oates (original paintings by Laurel Hausler)
- Extenuating Circumstances – The Mysterious Bookshop Edition, edited by Joyce Carol Oates (cover by Laurel Hausler)
- Retrograde, Meerkat Press, by Kat Hausler (cover by Laurel Hausler)
