= Hausner ratio =

Measure of flowability of a powder or granular material

The Hausner ratio is a number that is correlated to the flowability of a powder or granular material. It is named after the engineer Henry H. Hausner (1900–1995).

The Hausner ratio is calculated by the formula

$$H=\frac{\rho_T}{\rho_B}$$

where $\rho_B$ is the freely settled bulk density of the powder, and $\rho_T$ is the tapped bulk density of the powder. The Hausner ratio is not an absolute property of a material; its value can vary depending on the methodology used to determine it.

The Hausner ratio is used in a wide variety of industries as an indication of the flowability of a powder. A Hausner ratio greater than 1.25 - 1.4 is considered to be an indication of poor flowability. The Hausner ratio (H) is related to the Carr index (C), another indication of flowability, by the formula $H=100/(100-C)$.
