= Jan Strządała =

Polish poet

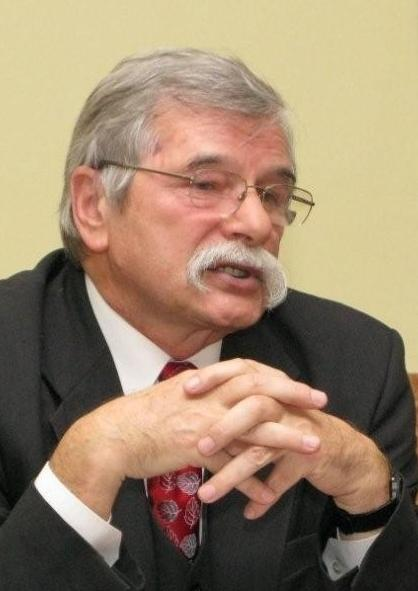
Jan Strządała

Jan Strządała (born 4 February 1945) is a Polish poet.

== Biography ==
Strządała was born on 4 February 1945 in Wisła, Poland. He studied at the Faculty of Medicine, University of Łódź (1961–1967). After the aborted literary studies, he started to work keeping up with gainful employment in various professions. He made his debut in 1969 with a book of lyrics Przegrany semestr under the pseudonym John Strehl.

In 1970–1977 he worked in the Publishing Institute "PAX" in Warsaw. During martial he law led the Gliwice Literary Group, of which he was a founder. From 1985 to 1991 he was an employee of the Polish Academy of Sciences. In the years 1993–1996 he presided the Katowice Branch of the Polish Writers Association. In 1999–2002 he was vice president of Polish Writers Association in Warsaw. He is also the president of the Club of Creative Unions in Gliwice.

More than 70 independent publications (poems, essays) appeared in cultural magazines as well as in the Polish Radio and Television. Various texts have been set to music, among other things by Ewa Szydło. Strządała is an honorary member of the Polish-American Poets Academy, Inc. in Wallington. His poetry has been translated into Russian, German, Czech, English, Italian and Esperanto. He was a participant of the German-Polish poets steamer.

== Books of poetry ==
- Przegrany semestr, (pseud. Jan Strehl), Warszawa: PAX, 1969
- Słoneczna noc, Warszawa: Czytelnik, 1983, ISBN 83-07-00859-X
- Trudna galaktyka, Warszawa: Czytelnik, 1988, ISBN 83-07-01872-2
- Szept igły w otwartej żyle, Wyd. SPP, Katowice1993, ISBN 83-901251-1-0
- Pochylone niebo, Warszawa: Latona, 1994, ISBN 83-85449-21-3
- Nieobecna noc, Kraków: Baran & Suszczyński, 1997, ISBN 83-85109-73-0
- Naga sukienka, Kraków: Baran & Suszczyński, 2001, ISBN 83-88575-15-5
- Tajemnica, Kraków: Miniatura, 2003, ISBN 83-7081-454-9
- Światło i ciało, Kraków: Miniatura, 2004, ISBN 83-7081-550-2
- Noc co noc, Kraków: Miniatura, 2005, ISBN 83-7081-787-4
- Młode słowa, Kraków: Miniatura, 2007, ISBN 978-83-7081-826-5
- Delikatne miejsce, Unibook, 2009
- Ciemnooka, (pseud. Dawid Glen), Hsg. e-bookowo.pl 2010, ISBN 978-83-61184-75-1
- Ciemnooka, (pseud. Dawid Glen), Wrocław 2010, wyd. II, ISBN 978-83-930391-0-4
- Wiersze I, Katowice: Hsg. Biblioteka Śląska, 2012, ISBN 978-83-60209-81-3
- Wiersze II, Katowice: Hsg. Biblioteka Śląska, 2012, ISBN 978-83-60209-80-6
- Pamięć Ciała bawi się moim sercem, Gliwice 2014, ISBN 978-83-930391-1-1
- Koraliki, Gliwice: Arka, 2015, ISBN 978-83-930391-2-8

== Major awards ==
- Award of the President of Gliwice in the field of culture for poetry in 1996, 2005
- Cross of Merit, Warschau 2005
- "Medal for Merit to Culture – Gloria Artis", Warschau 2011
- "Literary Excellence Award", May 2013, Polish American Poets Academy, Wallington, USA, beim Wettbewerb Johannes Paul II.
- "Literary Excellence Award", September 2013, Polish American Poets Academy, Wallington, USA, Wettbewerb um das patriotische Gedicht

== Bibliography ==
- Grupy Literackie w Polsce 1945–1980 – Hsg. Wiedza Powszechna Warszawa 1993
- WOREYD ALMANACH 2000
- WHO IS WHO W POLSCE – 2002
