= Klaus Renft Combo =

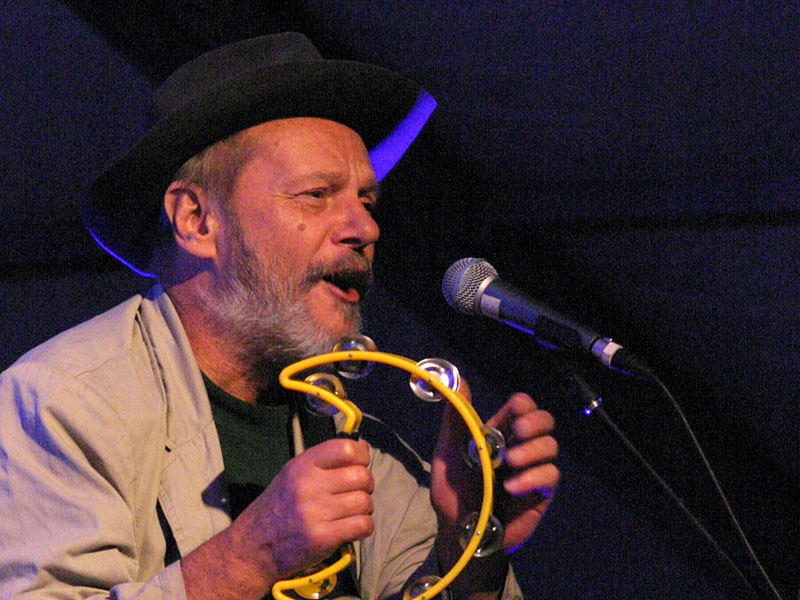
- Klaus Renft in 2003

Background information
- Origin: Leipzig, Germany
- Genres: Rock
- Years active: 1958–1975 and 1990–present
- Members: Christian "Kuno" Kunert; Thomas "Monster" Schoppe; Marcus Schloussen; Delle Kriese; Gisbert "Pitti" Piatkowski
- Past members: Klaus "Jenni" Renft; Heinz Prüfer; Peter "Pjotr" Kschentz; Peter "Cäsar" Gläser; Jochen Hohl; Gerulf Pannach
- Website: www.renft.de

The Klaus Renft Combo is a veteran German rock band, formed in Leipzig in what was then East Germany, in 1958. Founded by Klaus Renft, the band enjoyed significant success in East Germany until banned by the authorities in 1975. The band was reunited in 1990.

== Ban ==
The group was very successful, but seen by the Stasi as far too radical. In September 1975, Renft were asked to play for the Ministry of Culture in order to have their license (a document necessary for any working musician or musical group) renewed. Klaus Renft decided to conceal a cassette recorder behind his guitar to preserve their session. However, the woman in charge of their meeting, Comrade Oelschlägel, informed them that they would not be performing because their music was insulting and libelous, and further told them that they "[didn't] exist anymore." She explained that it was not that they were banned, but that they simply did not exist any longer "as a combo."

== Discography ==
- Klaus Renft Combo (1973)
- RENFT (1974)
- Rock aus Leipzig Renft-Combo live (1980)
- Renft - Die frühen Jahre (1990)
- RENFT LIVE 1990 (1990)
- Renft - Zwischen Liebe und Zorn (1993)
- Das Erbe Renft - Wer die Rose ehrt (1994)
- RENFT die schönsten Balladen (1996)
- renft - live in concert (1996)
- 40 Jahre Klaus Renft Combo (1997)
- Als ob nichts gewesen wär (1999)
- Unbequem woll´n wir sein (2003)
- Abschied und Weitergehen (2008)
- RENFT GOES ON Live 2010 (2010)
