= Hans Häußler =

German painter

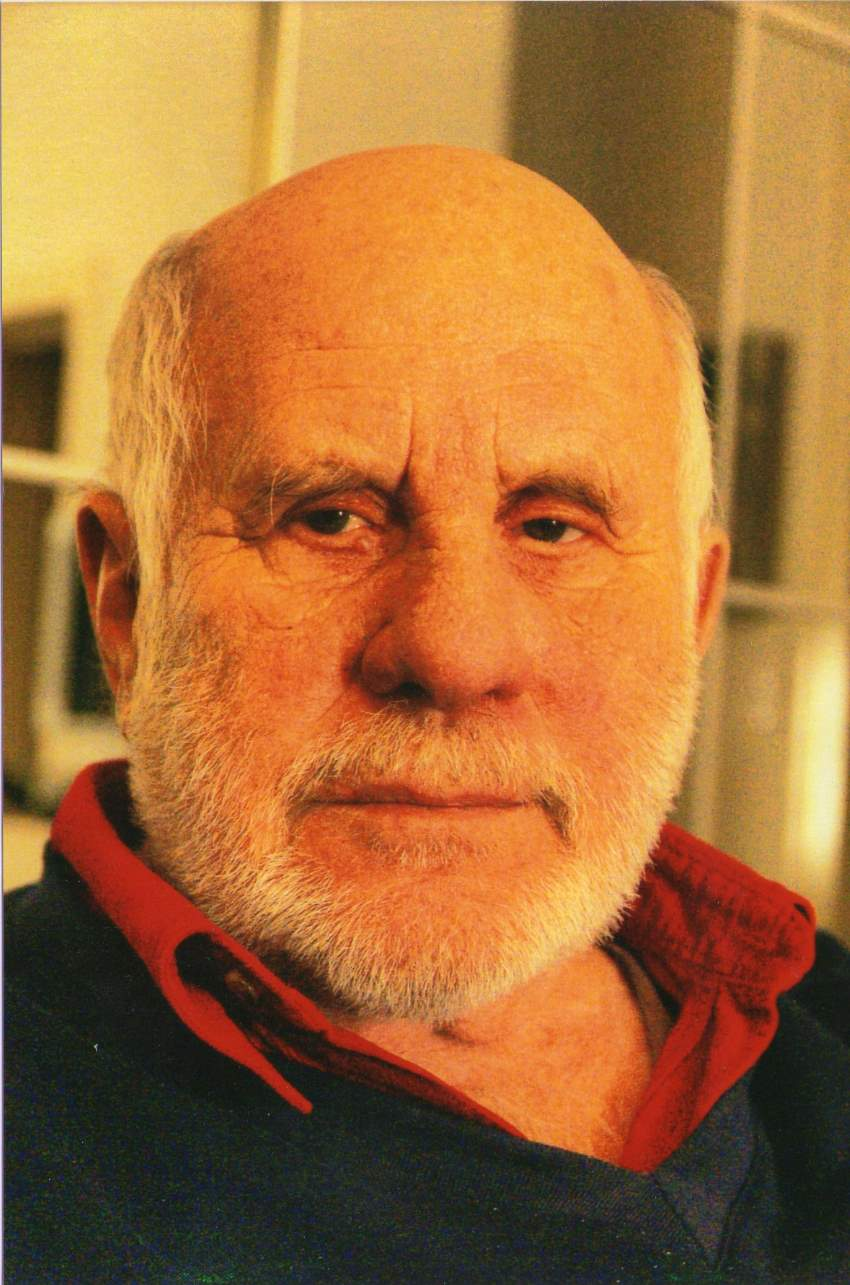
- Hans Häußler, photo by Sigrid Pohl-Häußler
- Born: October 29, 1931; Berlin, Germany
- Died: September 27, 2010 (aged 78)
- Occupations: Journalist, painter, musician, comedian, director and author

Hans Häußler (October 29, 1931 in Berlin – September 27, 2010) was a German journalist, painter, musician, comedian, director and author of radio plays.

== Biography ==
Häußler studied at the German Sport University Cologne, founded a political cabaret and worked as a trainer and as a lecturer in social psychiatry and in the penal system. He wrote a great number of radio plays, which he partly also composed. He belonged to the Association of German writers, the NGL (New Society for Literature Berlin) and other organizations.

Häußler was the "inventor" of the German-Polish poets steamer, on which he rode along a year between 1995 and 1999. The Berliner Märchentage (Berlin Fairytale Days) go back to him. He took part in the poetry festival "wortlust" in Lublin in 1997.

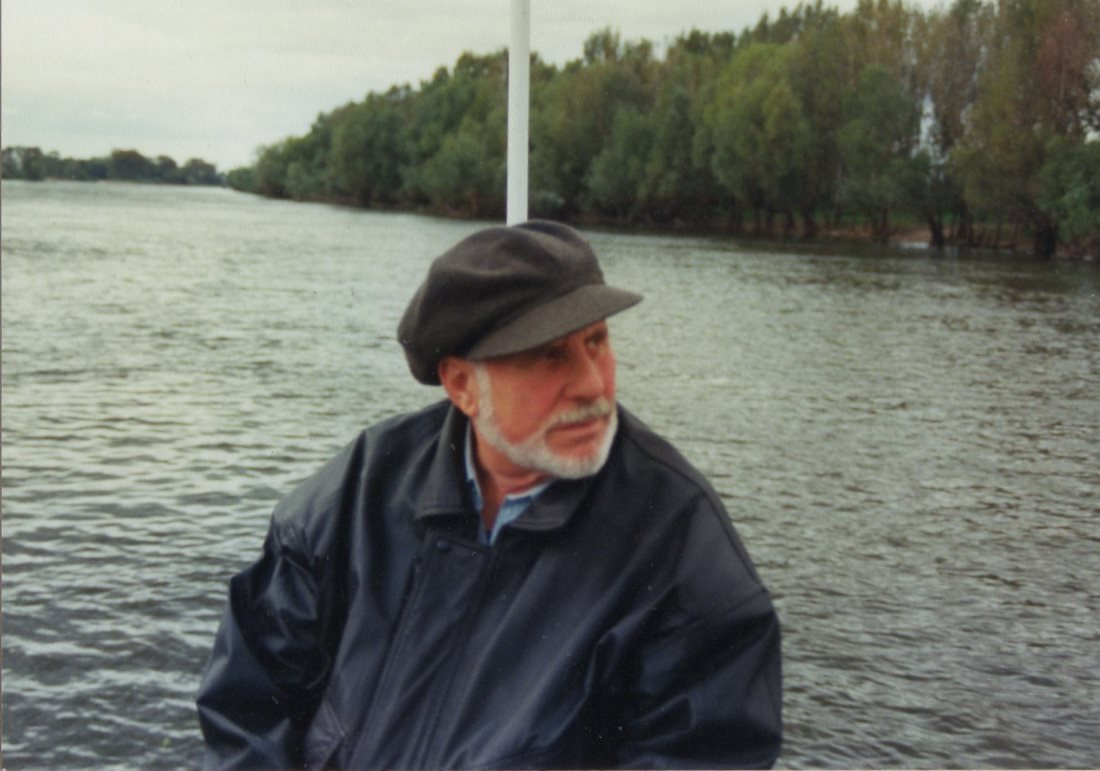
Poets steamer captain Hans Haußler on deck

Horst Bosetzky wrote an obituary: "A true Berlin he was, his father was a movie-director and actor. I have always seen as an actor: Hans, tall and charismatic, in stature as the broadcast ago a bear of man, a like Emil Jannings, Curd Jürgens, Hans Albers or Heinrich George. Whom he knew well. Also to Heinrich Zille, he reminded me. In addition to which he is lying on the Stahnsdorfer cemetery.“

== Works ==
=== Radio plays (produced) / selection ===
- A.B.M. – Requiem auf einen selbständigen Unternehmer, HR/SFB 1974 71 Minutes (Stereo)
- Abgrund – HR/SFB, 1984, 34 Minutes (Stereo)
- Alte Jakobstraße – SFB, 1968, 32 Minutes (Mono) – Berlin dialect
- Die Anhalterin – SWF, 1984, 24 Minutes (Stereo)
- Dummer August – HR,1974, 90 Minutes (Mono)
- Einbruch – WDR, 1978 (Stereo)
- Glückliche Reise – WDR, 1970 (Stereo), together with Wolfgang Graetz
- Harry K. – SFB, 1973 (Mono)
- Die Hochzeit des Schweinchens – DLR, 1992, 21 Minutes (Stereo)
- Die Hölle heißt, sich nicht mehr zu erinnern – WDR, 1966, (Mono)
- Im Labyrinth – SFB/WDR (Stereo)
- Kann man seine Eltern noch erziehen? – WDR, 1974 (Mono), together with Arthur de Fries
- Die Kunst des Überlebens – SFB, 1971, 38 Minutes (Stereo)
- Mein Mantel ist mein Haus – SFB, 1965, 38 Minutes (Mono)
- Der Mörder klingelt nicht – HR/SWF, 1979, 50 Minutes (Stereo)
- Die Raben vom Kietz – SFB, 1972, 62 Minutes (Mono), together with Wolfgang Wölfer
- Requiem für einen Penner – SFB (Stereo)
- Romantik, schöne Blüte der Angst – WDR, 1980, 54 Minutes (Stereo)
- Rotkäppchen und die Wölfe – WDR, 1973 (Mono)
- Samuel und Samuel oder Wer geht mit auf die Kirmes? – SWF/WDR, 1967, Minutes (Stereo)
- Schmetterlinge fliegen leise wie Schnee – RIAS, 1984, 35 Minutes (Stereo)
- Sinkende Fackel – Sachsenradio, 1991, 42 Minutes (Stereo)
- Spielen der Kinder im Hof verboten – RIAS/HR, 1969, 70 Minutes (Stereo), together with Wolfgang Graetz
- Unter dem Pflaster liegt der weiße Sand – SFB, 1979, 45 Minutes (Stereo), Berlin dialaect
- Wie Jonny nach Afrika kam – WDR, 1990, 43 Minutes (Stereo)
- Ein richtiger Lehrer – SFB, 1979
- Eine kleine Stadt zum Schlafen oder Die schreckliche Provinz – SFB/WDR, 1975 Minutes (Mono), together with Isabella Herskovics
- Überfall am hellichten Tag – WDR, 1967 (Stereo)
- Sinkende Fackel – 24. Oktober 2011, MDR Figaro

=== MC ===
- Kann ich nicht, mach ich nicht. Hörspiel zur Berufswahl

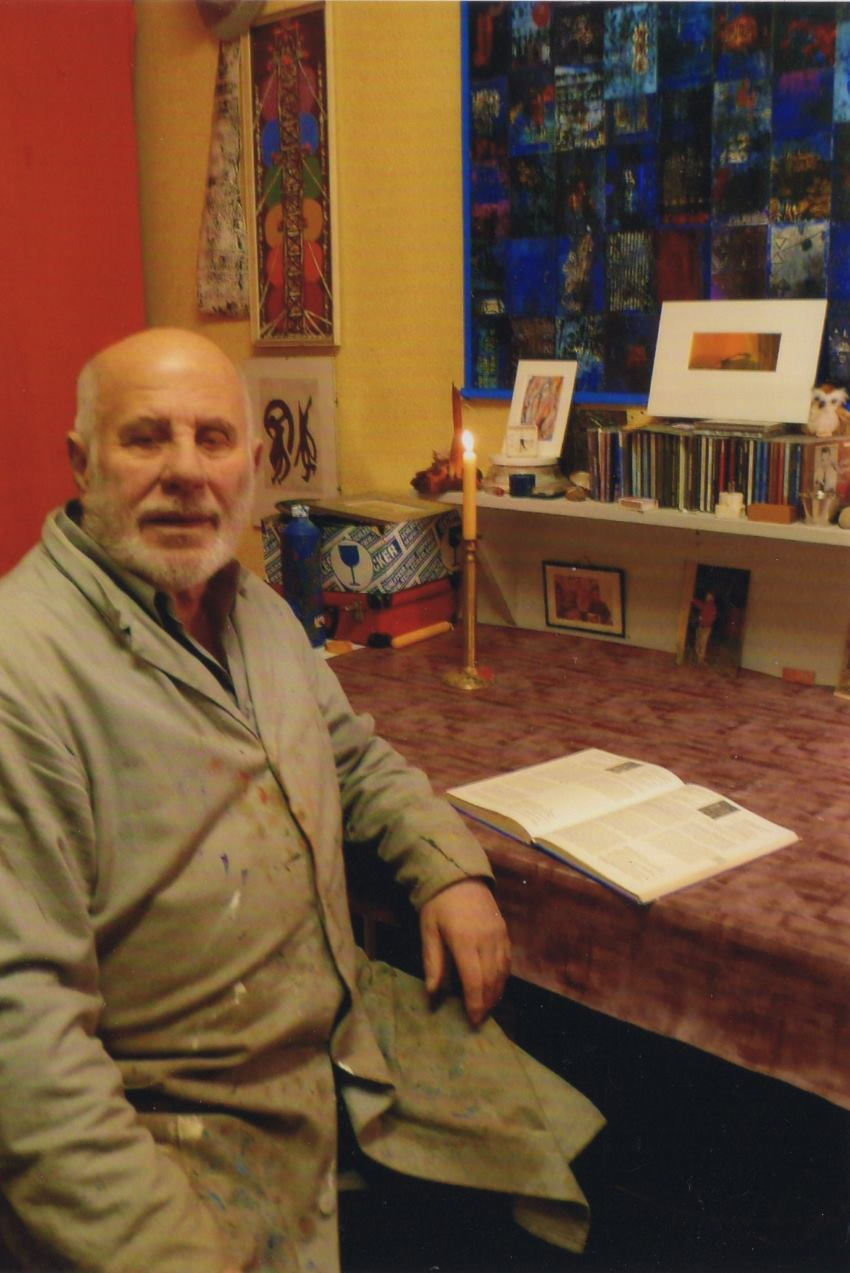
Hans Häußler in the studio; Photo: Sigrid Pohl-Häußler

=== Books ===
- Soziales Training durch Rollenspiel, 1991, mit Artur de Fries, ISBN 3-434-45055-6.
- Immer wenn ich einschlafen möchte, geht eine Amsel über den Hof, Berlin, Mariannenpresse, 1983

=== Radio Play of the Month ===
- Abgrund, Regie: Christian Gebert (SFB), 1984
