= Gabriela Matuszek =

Polish literary historian, essayist, critic and translator

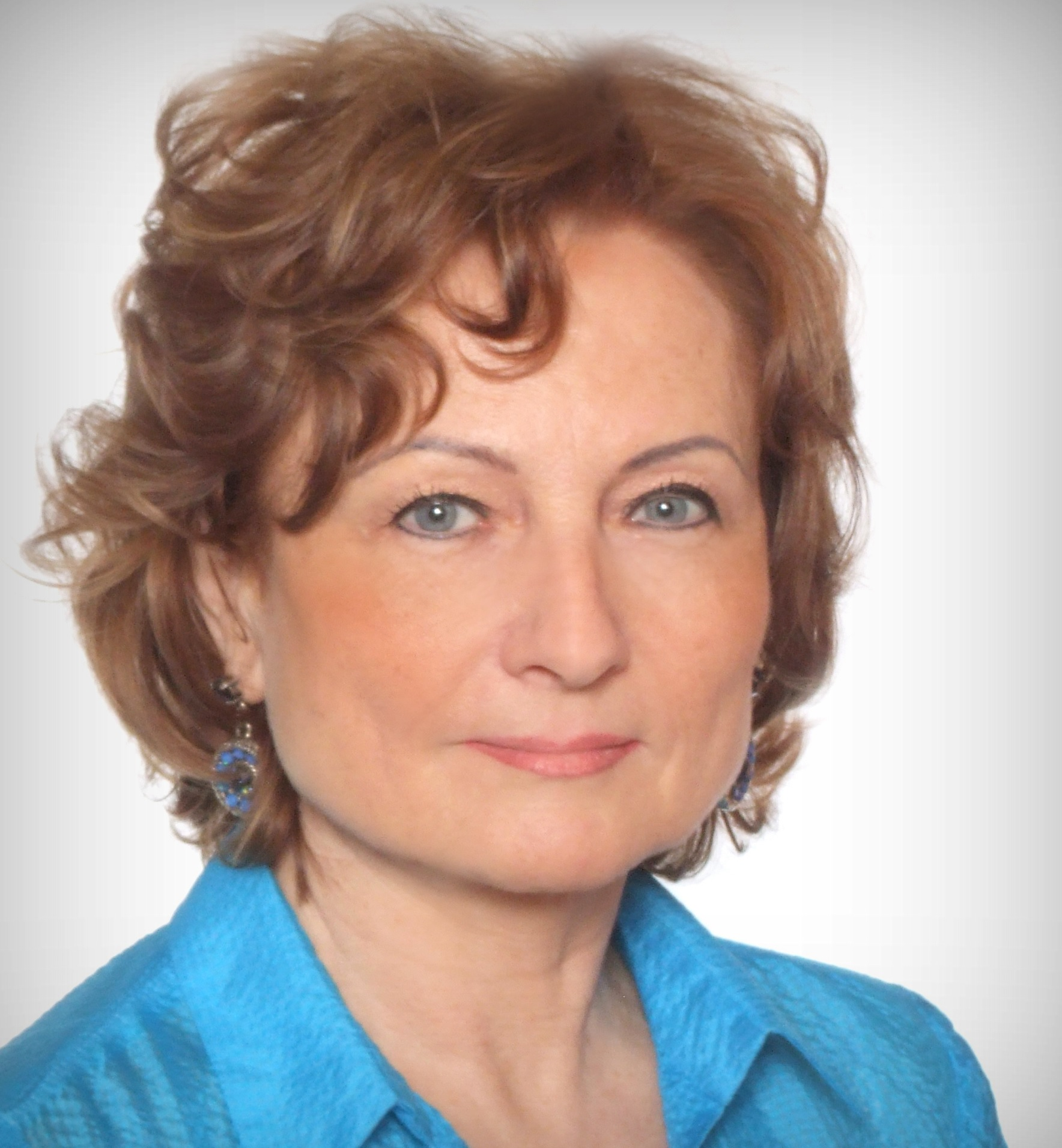
Gabriela Matuszek

Gabriela Matuszek-Stec (born 31 December 1953 in Jaworzno) is a Polish literary historian, essayist, critic and translator of German literature.

== Biography ==
Matuszek-Stec is a professor of Polish Studies at the Jagiellonian University in Krakow, specializing in the literature of the 19th and 20th century - primarily with Stanisław Przybyszewski, the naturalistic drama and modern prose, Polish-German literature associations and literary translation. From 1983 to 1987 she lectured on Polish literature at the Humboldt University of Berlin, there was a visiting professor (2004 and 2006), as in Jena, Cologne, Leipzig, Vienna, Grenoble and Prague.

She received a scholarship of scientific and literary foundations, including German Schiller Society in Marbach am Neckar (1995, 1996), the Academy of Literature in Ranis (2002), the International Writers and Translators Center of Rhodes (2002), the Baltic Centre for Writers and Translators, Gotland (2003). Since 1992 she has been a member of the Societas Jablonoviana in Leipzig.

She is the founder and director of the first "Polish Literature Institute" (Studium Literacko-Artystycznego). From 2005 to 2008 she was Vice-President, then to 2014 President of the Krakow branch of the Polish Writers' Union SPP since 2014 Member of the Board. Since 2007, Gabriela Matuszek editor of the literary magazine Studium and the "Krakow Library of the Polish Writers' Association" (since 2009). Matuszek was a participant of the German-Polish poets steamer and the German-Polish poetry festivals “word lust“ in Lublin and is part of the close vicinity of this group of authors. She is married to the Polish painter Grzegorz Stec.

== Prizes ==
- Medal of the National Science Commission, 2002
- Prize of the Polish Ministry of Science for her book ″Stanisław Przybyszewski - a modern writer. Essays and prose - attempt a monograph″, 2009
- Bronze Gloria Artis Medal for Merit to Culture, 2015

== Works ==
=== Books ===
- '"Der geniale Pole"? Niemcy o Stanisławie Przybyszewskim (1892–1992), Universitas, Kraków 1993, ISBN 83-7052-114-2; wyd. II rozszerzone Kraków 1996, ISBN 83-7052-317-X.
- "Der geniale Pole"? Stanisław Przybyszewski in Deutschland. Aus dem Polnischen von Dietrich Scholze, Igel Verlag, Paderborn 1996, ISBN 3-89621-014-9.
- Naturalistyczne dramaty/Naturalistische Dramen, Universitas, Kraków 2001 (ISBN 83-7052-640-3), II wyd. Kraków 2008, ISBN 97883-242-0859-3.
- Stanisław Przybyszewski - pisarz nowoczesny. Eseje i proza - próba monografii, Universitas, Kraków 2008, ISBN 978-83-242-0930-9.
- "Krisen und Neurosen – Das Werk Stanisław Przybyszewskis in der literarischen Moderne." Aus dem Polnischen von Dietmar Gass, Igel Verlag, Hamburg 2013, ISBN 978-3-86815-567-9.
- Maski i demony wczesnego modernizmu, Wydawnictwo Uniwersytetu Jagiellońskiego, Kraków 2014, ISBN 978-83-233-3769-0.

=== Editorial work - a selection ===
- St. Przybyszewski, Dzieci szatana, Oficyna Literacka, Kraków 1993 (oprac.) (ISBN 83-85158-79-0).
- Über Stanisław Przybyszewski. Rezensionen - Erinnerungen - Porträts - Studien. Rezeptionsdokumente aus 100 Jahren, Igel Verlag, Paderborn 1995 (ISBN 3-89621-013-0).
- Recepcja literacka i process literacki. Literarische Rezeption und literarischer Prozess. (O polsko-niemieckich związkach literackich w okresie modernizmu i dwudziestolecia międzywojennego), Kraków 1999 (z G. Ritzem) (ISBN 83-7052-846-5).
- Lektury polonistyczne: Od realizmu do preekspresjonizmu, Universitas, Kraków 2001 (ISBN 83-7052-606-3).
- St. Przybyszewski, Poematy prozą (oprac.), Wydawnictwo Literackie, Kraków 2003 (ISBN 83-08-03548-5).
- Literatura wobec nowej rzeczywistości, Księgarnia Akademicka, Kraków 2005 (ISBN 83-7188-815-5).
- Po(st)mosty. Polacy i Niemcy w nowej Europie. Tom ofiarowany pamięci Henryka Bereski, Księgarnia Akademicka, Kraków 2006 (ISBN 83-7188-915-1).
- Krynickie Jesienie Literackie. Poezje, eseje, głosy, Kraków 2007 (ISBN 978-83-918287-4-8).
- Fährmann grenzenlos. Deutsche und Polen im heutigen Europa. Zu Gedenken an Henryk Bereska, Georg Olms Verlag, Zürich, New York 2008 (red., z B. Helbig-Mischewski), (ISBN 978-3-487-13639-4).

=== Translations of German literature – selection ===
- St. Przybyszewski, "Synagoga szatana" i inne eseje, Kraków 1995 (ISBN 83-7124-070-8)
- Dieter Kalka, Wszystko to tylko teatr i inne opowiadania, Poznań 1999 (together with Marek Śnieciński) (ISBN 83-87235-26-1)
- F. Mitterer, Dzika kobieta, w: F. Mitterer, Teatr zaangażowany. Antologia współczesnej dramaturgii austriackiej, t. 3, Warszawa 2002 (ISBN 83-7188-815-5)
