= Grzegorz Stec =

Polish painter, graphic artist and poet (born 1955)

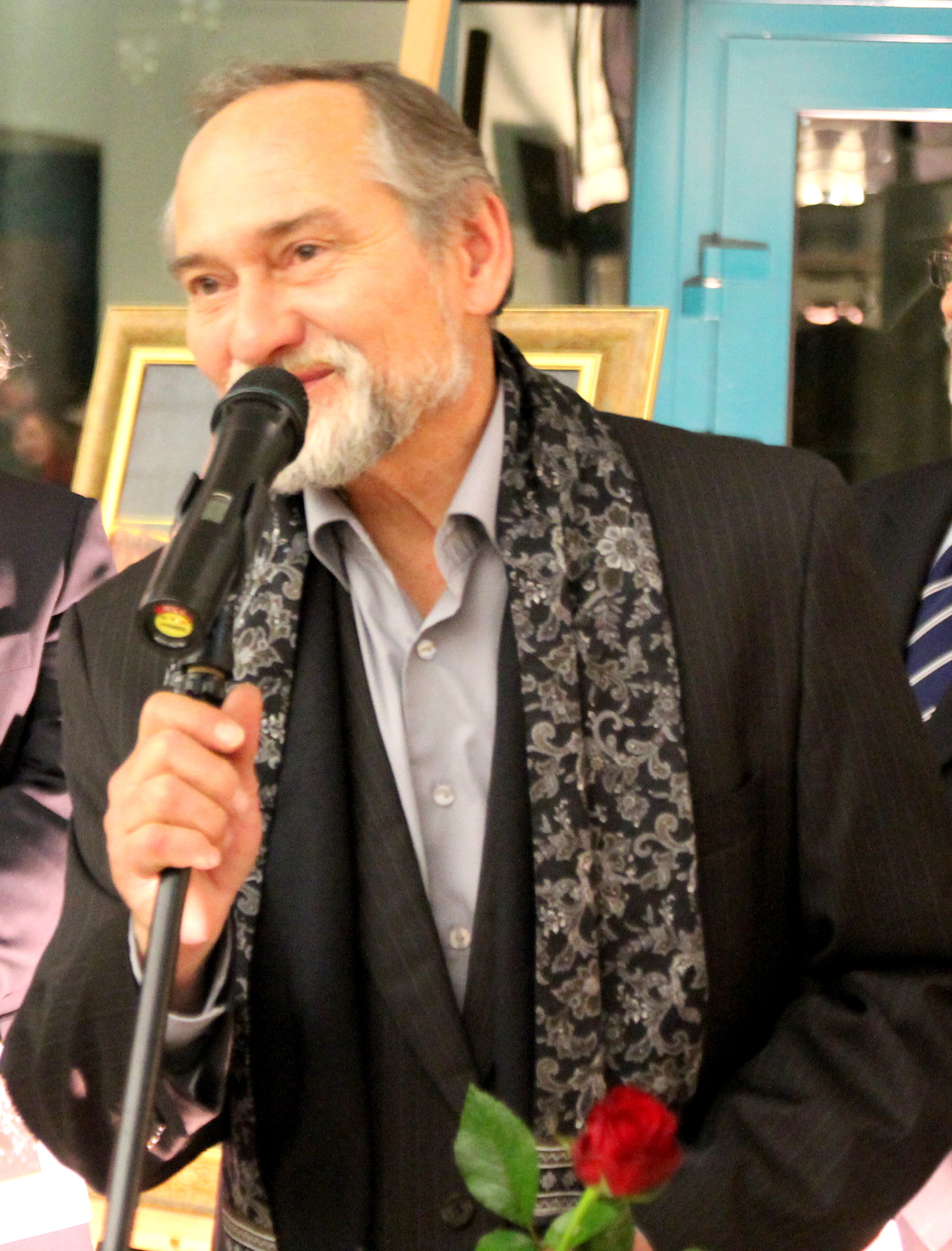
Grzegorz Stec

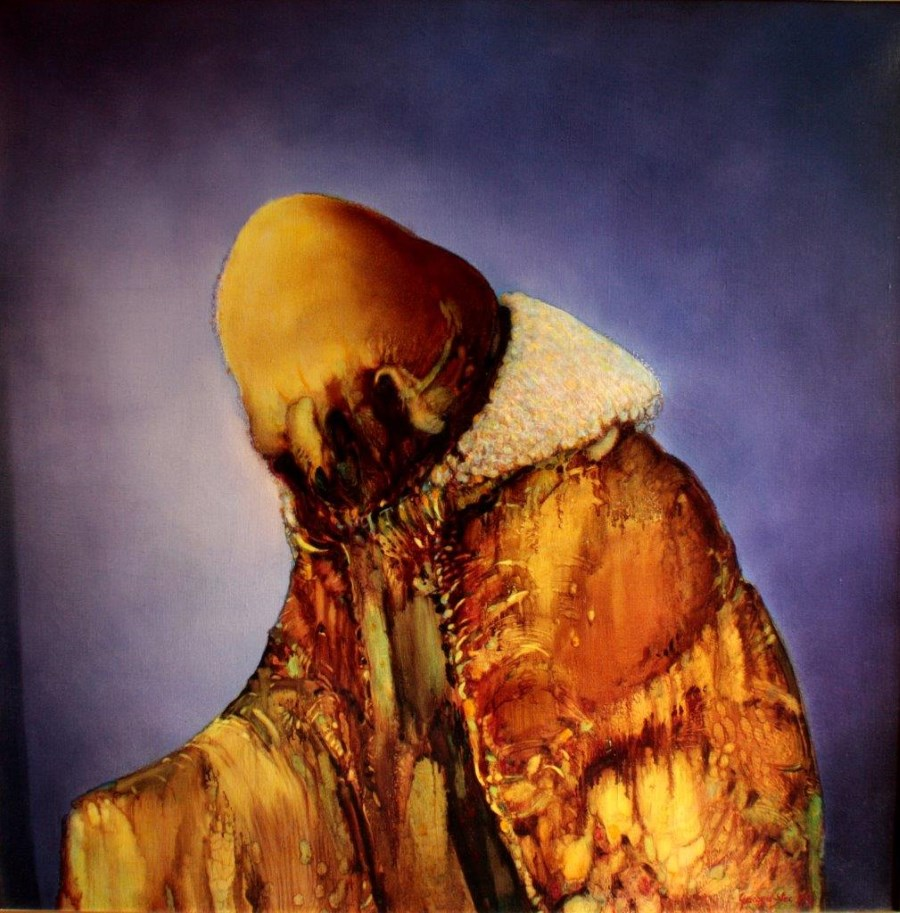
Grzegorz Stec "Prince" 1997, Öl auf Leinwand, 90x90 cm

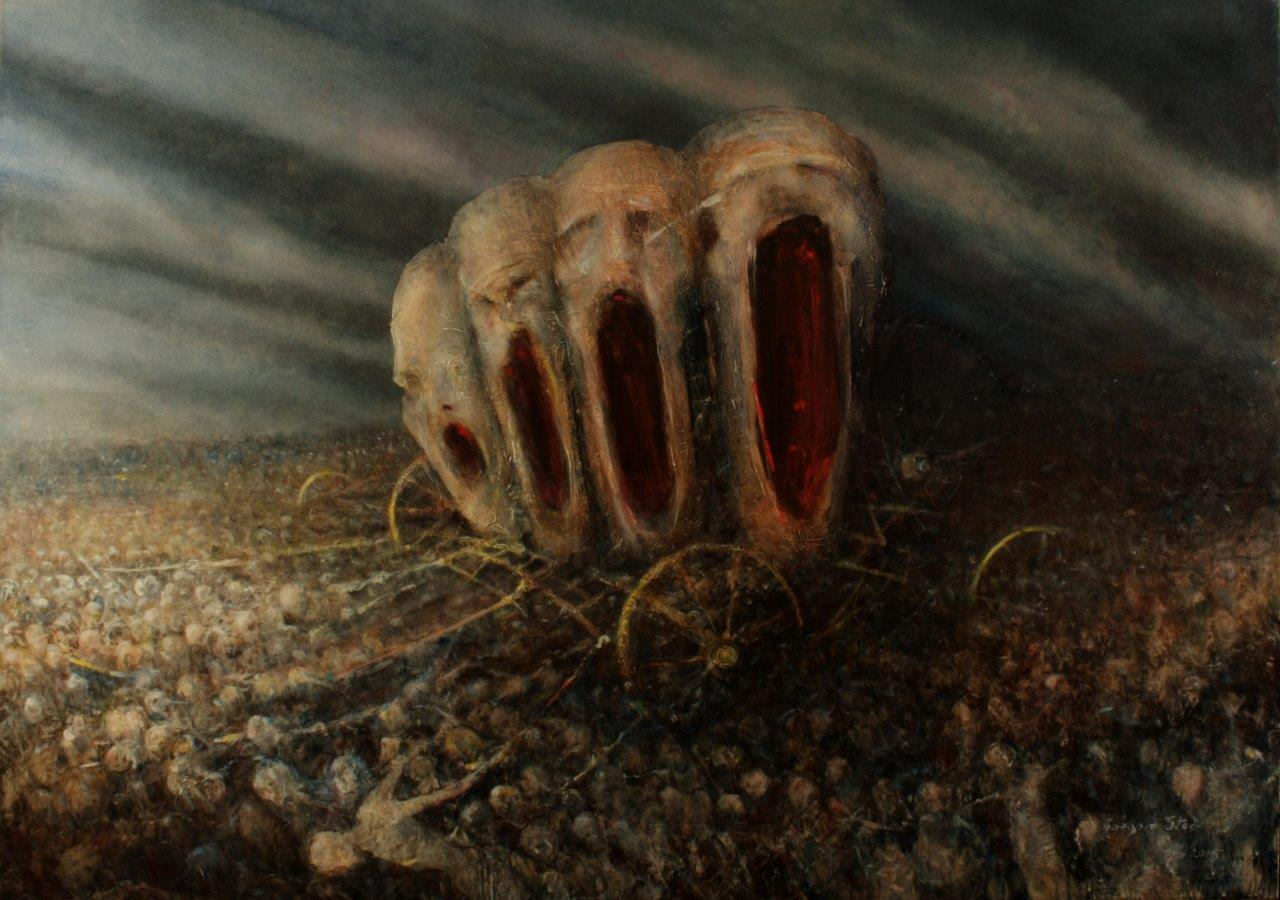
Grzegorz Stec "Wóz krzyku" III, 2015, Oel auf Leinwand, 100x140

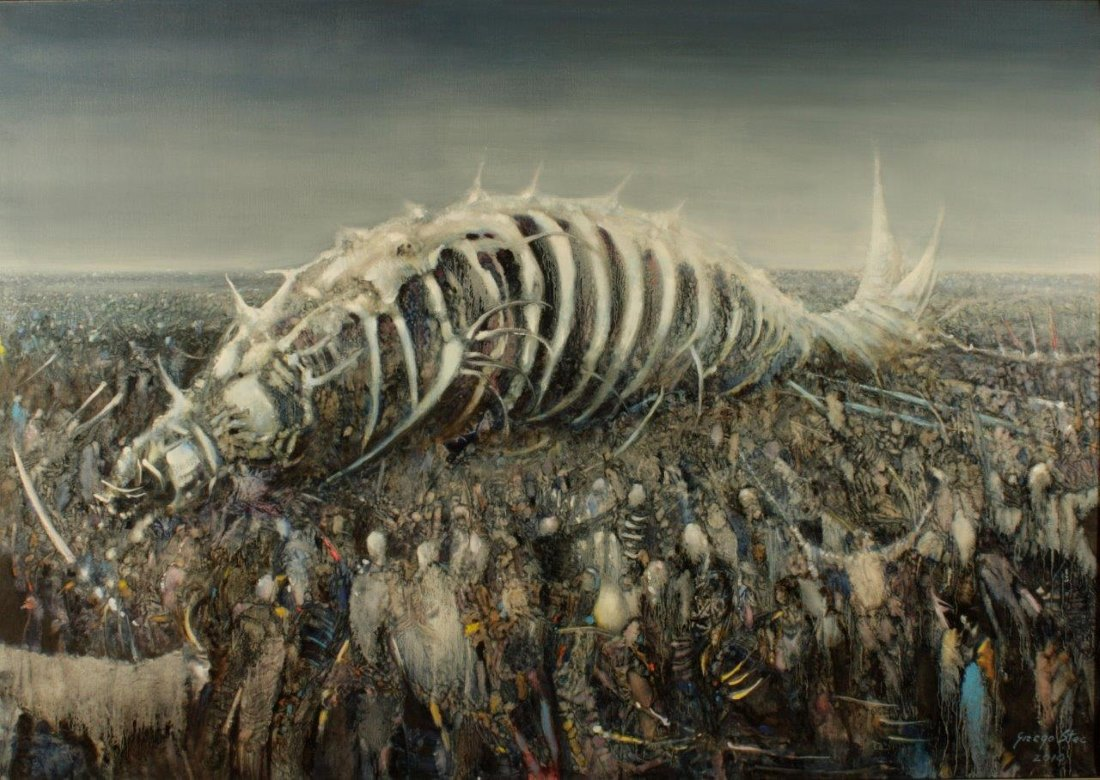
Gemälde von Grzegorz Stec, "Hunger", 2010, Oel auf Leinwand, 70x100

Grzegorz Stec (born January 24, 1955) is a Polish painter, graphic artist and poet.

== Biography ==
Stec was born on January 24, 1955 in Kraków, Poland. In 1976–1981, he studied at the Jan Matejko Academy of Fine Arts graphics under Professor Włodzimierz Kunz and painting under Professor Jan Świderski. Stec had over 50 solo exhibitions, including the United States, Sweden, Germany and France. From 1996 to 2002 he was Artist in Residence at the Society for Arts Chicago (Exhibitions: “Letters to the Masters” (1996), "Exodus or Carnival?" (1997) und "Aqueducts of Dream" (1998)). From 2008 to 2009 retrospectives in Kraków - Pałac Sztuki (2012), in "Solvay" Centrum Sztuki Współczesnej [Centre for Contemporary Art] (2014), at the Judaica Foundation – Center For Jewish Culture Kraków (2014). His large-scale paintings come work as a book illustrator and poster artist. About the work of Grzegorz Stec Polish television filmed the movie Zadręcza mnie zapach Czerni (1991, directed by Cezary Nowicki). Stec introduced in Germany at the Polish Institute Leipzig (2014) and in the gallery Abakus (Berlin Weissensee 2015). His poems were translated into German by Dieter Kalka. The art critic Marek Sołtysik about Stec: "He is a prophet, a prophet of the apocalypse." (2011). "Only few artists can boast of such mature craft. In the case of Master Stec it is a recognized once and for all through the autumn Atelier 2014 ". He is married to the Polish literary historian Gabriela Matuszek und lives in Kraków.

== Work ==
=== Individual exhibitions (selection) ===
- Klub Olimp, Kraków, 1979
- Galeria Mały Rynek, Kraków, 1985
- Emigrant's Club, Stockholm, Sweden, 1986
- Galeria Inny Świat, Kraków, 1986
- Teatr Stary, Kraków, 1987
- Galeria Inny Świat, Kraków, 1988
- Galeria Inny Świat, Kraków, 1989
- Muzeum Śląskie, Katowice, 1989
- Stara Galeria, Kraków, 1991
- Galeria Profil, Poznań, 1992
- Teatr Witkacego, Zakopane, 1992
- Stara Galeria, Kraków, 1993
- Galeria Inny Świat, Kraków, 1993
- PAAS Gallery, New York, 1995
- Dom Natana Spiry, Kraków, 1995
- Insights, The John G. Blank Center for the Art, Michigan City (with works of Adam Fedorowicz), 1996
- Letters to the Mastres, 1112 Gallery, The Society for Arts, Chicago,1996
- Exodus or Carnival?, 1112 Gallery, The Society for Arts, Chicago, 1997
- Aqueducts of Dream, 1112 Gallery, The Society for Arts, Chicago, 1998
- Galeria Centrum, Nowohuckie Centrum Kultury Kraków, 2002
- Muzeum Historii Miasta Łodzi, Łódź, 2005
- Akwedukty snów, Galeria Ermitaż, Muzeum Łazienki Królewskie, Warsaw, 2006
- Galleri Mitteleuropa, Stockholm, 2007
- Galeria Kuriera Plus, New York, 2008
- Polnisches Generalkonsulat New York City, 2008
- Fundacja Kościuszkowska, New York, 2009
- Oto - patrz Fryderyku (with Krzysztof Izdebsk-Cruz and Marcin Kołpanowicz), Polska Filharmonia Bałtycka oraz Galeria Klucznik, 2010
- Centrum Sztuki Współczesnej, Kołobrzeg (with Marcin Kołpanowicz), 2010
- Pisane światłem, pisane mrokiem, Centrum Kultury Żydowskiej, Kraków, 2011
- Ciemne epifanie, Pałac Sztuki Towarzystwa Przyjaciół Sztuk Pięknych w Krakowie, 2012
- Jest czerń tak przezroczysta..., Galeria Ars Nova in Łódź, 2012
- Collegium Novum Uniwersytetu Jagiellońskiego, Kraów, 2013
- Mairie de Saint-Ouen Marchefroy, France, 2013
- POSTkarnawał, Dwór Czeczów, Kraków, 2013
- W świetle, w ciemności, Centrum Kultury Żydowskiej/Jiddish Culture Centre, Kraków, 2014
- Wokół Antygony, Centrum Sztuki Współczesnej Solvay, Kraków, 2014
- In Licht und Finsternis, Polish Institut Leipzig, 2014
- Melancholia i Maskarada II, Galeria Sztuki Współczesnej DAGMA ART, Katowice, 2015
- Wokół masek i demonów, Jama Michalika, Kraków, 2015
- Melancholie und Maskerade, Galerie Abakus, Berlin (together with Polish Embassy and Polnish Culture Institut Berlin), 2015
- Wóz krzyku, Pałac Sztuki, Kraków, 2015

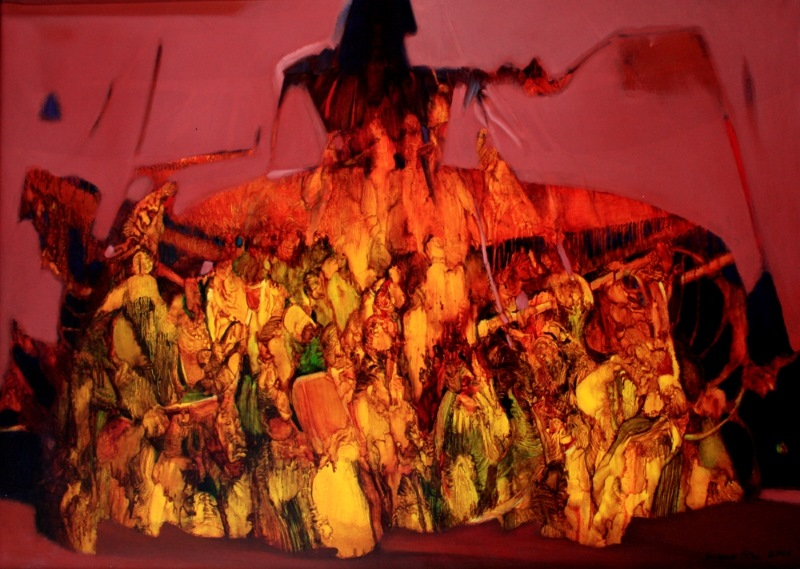
Grzegorz Stec, "Zarin", Oel auf Leinwand, 100x140cm

=== Poetry ===
- Nikt tu nie szuka odpowiedzi, Kraków 1999 ISBN 83-87694-98-3
- Melencolia, Kraków 2007 ISBN 978-83-902110-9-1

== Bibliography (selection) ==
- Marek Sołtysik, Na szlaku mocnych wystaw, „Kraków“ 2015 Nr 1, S. 92.
- Spontaniczność, precyzja i energia światła. Z Grzegorzem Stecem rozmawia Michalina Domoń, „Artysta i Sztuka“ 2013 Nr 9, S. 80-91.
- Marek Sołtysik, Światło, które odgania sępy, „Kraków” Nr 3, S. 93.
- Wojciech Ligęza, Cztery sale: korowód, „Kraków” Nr 3, S. 92.
- Beata Anna Symołon, Niezbędny jest tylko czas…,
- Marek Sołtysik, Światło, które odgania sępy „Kraków” 2011 Nr 11-12 (November/Dezember), S. 93.
- Gabriela Matuszek, Akwedukty intrygujących metafor. O malarstwie Grzegorza Steca, „Kraków” „Kraków” 2010 Nr 4.
- Izabela Joanna Bożek, Zagadka, żywioł i poezja, „Kurier Plus” New York, 10. Mai 2008
- Czesław Karkowski, „Efektowne obraz Grzegorza Steca”, „Przegląd Polski”, New York, 9. Mai 2008
- Tadeusz Nyczek, Katalog wystawy Grzegorz Stec, Akwedukty snów / Aqueducts of Dreams, Muzeum Łazienki Królewskim w Warszawie, Galeria Ermitaż, 2006
- Marcin Kołpanowicz, Grzegorz Stec, jest czerń… Katalog wystawy w Galerii Centrum, Kraków 2002.
- Anna Bugajska, Historie z wyobraźni. Wystawa malarstwa Grzegorza Steca, „Gazeta Wyborcza” Kraków, 24. Mai 2002
- Marcin Kołpanowicz, Katalog wystawy w Galerii Centrum w Krakowie, 2002
- Ewa Krasoń, „Akwedukty snu, nowe obrazy Grzegorza Steca w Galerii Towarzystwa Sztuki”, „Monitor”, dodatek kulturalny do „Dziennika Związkowego:, Chicago, January 1999
- Wanda Pietrzyk-Małysa, „Exodus czy karnawał? Panoramiczne malarstwo Grzegorza Steca”
- „Kalejdoskop Tygodnia”, Magazyn Kulturalny „Dziennika Związkowego”, Chicago, 22. Mai 1997 (Nr 20)
- Ewa Krasoń, Malarstwo i poezja Grzegorza Steca, „Kalejdoskop Tygodnia”, Magazyn Kulturalny „Dziennika Związkowego”, Chicago, 31. Mai 1996 (Nr 5).
- Grzegorz Niziołek, Katalog wystawy w Galerii Jatki, Nowy Targ, 1992
- Tadeusz Nyczek, Program Galerii „Inny Świat”, July 1988
- Marta Fita, Program Galerii „Inny Świat”, July 1988
- Maciej Szybist, „Kuszenie św. Mahlera”, Program wystawy w Teatrze Starym, Kraków, April 1987
- Roman Świątek, Program wystawy w Teatrze Starym, Kraków, April 1987
- Tadeusz Nyczek, Katalog wystawy w Galerii Mały Rynek, Kraków 1985
