= Jolanta Pytel =

Polish writer and poet

Jolanta Pytel (born August 29, 1952 in Zielona Góra/Poland) is a Polish poet, writer and promoter of literary life in Zielona Góra.

== Biography ==
She studied Polish philology and history at the University of Zielona Góra, worked as a teacher, librarian and journalist. In 1970 she made her debut with poems in "Nadodrze". Her texts have been published in many literary magazines, among others in "Pro Libris", "Pegaz Lubuski". She is the founder and chairman of the "Stowarzyszenie Jeszcze Żywych Poetów ("Club of the still living poets") and the Uniwersytet poezji (University of poetry) and was a participant at the German-Polish poets steamer and the German-Polish poetry festival "word lust" in Lublin (1997). Her texts have been translated into English. In German translation of Dieter Kalka they were published in "Muschelhaufen" (2001) and in Ostragehege No. 9 and on Portal Poland.

== Poetry ==
- Opowieść o Gabrielu (1976)
- Tyle światła wokół (1978)
- Destiny (1994)
- Oko śmierci (1994)
- Przebudzenie/Awakenings (1995)
- 40 i cztery (1996)
- Czarny aptekarz (1999)
- Requiem dla Helenki (1999)
- Włócznia słońca (2003)
- Wejście w niebo (2006)
- Zegar/The Clock, bilingual Polish/English (2010)
- Nad urwiskiem (2011)
- Żywe oczy wiersza / Augen des Gedichts, anthology, Polish-German, publisher Jolanta Pytel and Czesŀaw Sobkowiak, Organon Zielona Góra 2001. ISBN 83-87294-25-X

== Prizes ==
- Nagrody Lubuski Wawrzyn Literacki, 2003

== Bibliography ==
- "Odra poetów", Gazeta Zachodnia, Sept. 1998
- "Rejs do Szczecina", Kurier Szczecinski, 17. September 1998
- Page of the Polish Writer's Union SPP
- "Rejs ku źródłom", Gazeta Lubuska, 27. September 1996 (Izabela Filipiak, Jolanta Pytel, Ewa Sonnenberg, Ingo Schramm)
- "Jak korek na fali ...", Marta Fox in Śląsk, 1996, Nr 11/13
- "Błędni rycerze", Bronisław Słomka, 2./3. November 1996, Gazeta Lubuska
- "Statkiem Literackim", Katarzyna Jarosz-Rabiej, Gazeta Lubuska/Komunikaty Nr.6, 1996, (s. 15) Zielona Góra, ISSN 1426-319X
- "Buchhalter pisze wiersze", Danuta Piekarska, Gazeta Lubuska, 27./28. Juni 1998 (Universitet Poezjii, Olga Tokarczuk)
