= Hanna Malewska =

Polish historian and writer (1911–1983)

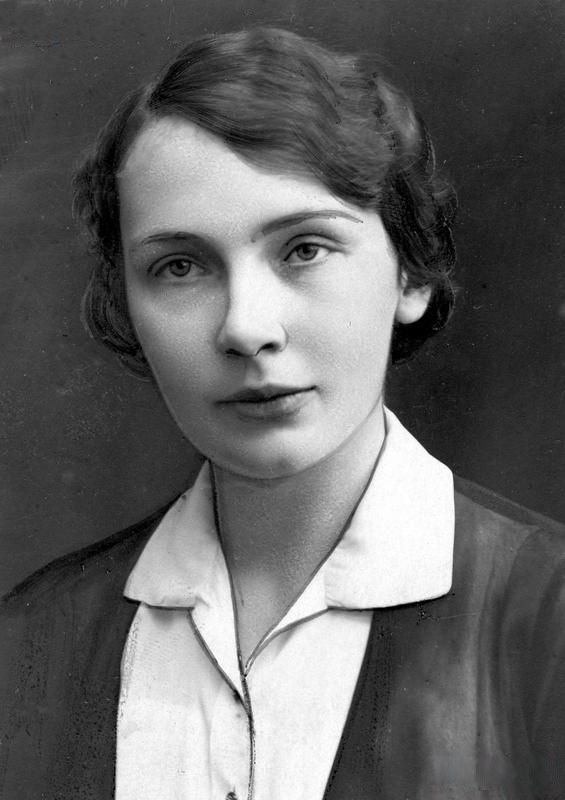
- Born: June 21, 1911; Jordanowice, Warsaw Governorate, Congress Poland
- Died: March 27, 1983 (aged 71); Kraków, Kraków Voivodeship, Polish People's Republic
- Education: Catholic University of Lublin

Hanna Malewska (1911–1983) was a Polish historian and writer, author of historical stories and novels, translator, Home Army soldier, member of the Tygodnik Powszechny team, and editor-in-chief of the monthly Znak.

== Early life ==
Born on 21 June 1911 in Jordanowice (now a district of Grodzisk Mazowiecki) to a family descended from the Mazovian line of the Malewskis, impoverished nobility who made considerable contributions to nurturing independence traditions, the daughter of Bronisław Malewski a Jadwiga née Ciświcka.

Her father was a doctor and army general, from December 1914, in the medical service of, among others, Gen. Józef Dowbor-Muśnicki's I Corps. After the war, the first Head of the Sanitary Department of the Polish Army in the rank of major-general, a member of the Legislative Sejm on behalf of the National Democracy Movement, and the head of a sanatorium in Grodzisk Mazowiecki. He died tragically in 1920 when after a military commission meeting, he fell under the wheels of a car leaving Belweder Palace. Following her father's death, Hanna settled in Lublin together with her mother and older brother Andrew (d. 1984). She did not share her father's political views. Throughout her life, she was accompanied by the support of her mother. From her family home, Hanna inherited the cult of quiet work and selflessness as well as the ethos of independence.

== Education ==
In 1921, she started attending the Union of Lublin State Gymnasium for Girls in Lublin. The years spent at this school (1921–1929), in a class with an extended humanistic profile, allowed her to acquire basic education and language skills. She thus learned to speak fluent Latin and French, which increased her fascination with France and Romance culture. Years of conspiracy, during World War II, taught her to speak fluent English and consequently also made her an admirer of English language culture.

In 1929, Hanna Malewska began studying Polish and history at the Catholic University of Lublin. After a year, she gave up her Polish studies to have more time to deepen her historical knowledge. In this period (1929–1933), she honed her historical research skills under professors, such as Jerzy Manteuffel, Kazimierz Michałowski, Leon Białkowski and Aleksander Kossowski, under whose academic supervision she wrote her master's thesis entitled Diary of Cardinal de Retz as a historical source. From these masters, she acquired the methodology and humility to engage in time-consuming historical research and conduct in-depth analysis of archival sources.

There is no evidence that during her studies, Hanna had attended Lublin branch meetings of the Rebirth Association of Catholic Academic Youth. At that time she did, however, develop a universalistic view of social and religious problems, sensitivity to the plight of the unprivileged and the need to provide them with aid.

In 1930, she was recognised as a talented student. In a competition marking the centenary of the outbreak of the November Uprising, she was awarded a prize for two unpublished and now probably lost works entitled Battle of Rogożnica and Międzyrzecze and Chrzanowski’s Expedition in the Lublin Region.

It was also during her studies that debuted as a journalist and the author of a historical novel. In 1931, the Żołnierz Polski (1931, No. 27–30) published episodes from her Napoleonic era tale Cabrera (A True Story), for which the periodical awarded her the first prize. That same year, during convalescence from typhus, she wrote a story for a completion organized by the Ministry of Religious Denominations and Public Education. Drawing on Hellenistic models, her Greek Spring (Wiosna grecka) referred to Plato's passion for sports and philosophy. Receiving a distinction, this work was also her first book.

== Career ==
After graduating, at the turn of 1933/1934, she gained work experience as a trainee teacher at the St Stanisław Kostka Gymnasium for Boys, Warsaw, under the guidance Tadeusz Bornholtz, a distinguished historian and teacher, the author of books and textbooks on the methodology of teaching history. Faced with unemployment, she found her first job as a history teacher at a trade school in Niepołomice. In 1935, together with her mother, she moved to Warsaw and up to 1940 worked as a teacher of history and the introduction to philosophy at Krystyna Malczewska's Gymnasium and Lyceum (middle and high school).

Thanks to the Jagiellonian Library collection, as a beginning teacher, she was able to continue her historical studies, the purpose of which was to write a novel about Charles V of Hapsburg (1516–1556) and his vision of uniting Europe. It was not so much the political aims that interested Malewska as the monarch's moral perspective, his in-depth psychological portrait, and understanding the person as an existential phenomenon. She described historical processes in her novels quite differently from her nineteenth-century predecessors, who focused on presenting images. The main goal of her writing was to examine the roots of the historical phenomena and processes. She perceived history not as a picture of the past, but as a tangle of human aspirations emanating from diverse socio-political trends.

In 1936, her two-volume novel Iron Crown (Żelazna korona) was awarded the second prize (the first prize was not awarded) in a competition organised by the Lwów publishing house Książnica-Atlas under the patronage of the Polish Academy of Literature. This book established her reputation as a young talented writer whom critics considered the most promising author in the historical novel genre.

In 1938, having received a National Culture Fund of Poland scholarship, she left for France, where she undertook studies in European Middle Ages and analysed sources for her next novel as well as in order to compile an anthology of medieval texts. These thirteenth-century manuscripts became the basis for her novel The Rocks Will Cry Out (Kamienie wołać będą). The analysed events were centred around the construction of the cathedral in Beauvais. The outbreak of World War II delayed the novel's publication until 1946, and in 1948 it was awarded the Włodzimierz Pietrzak Prize.

== Second World War ==
Faced with war, without interrupting her writing, she engaged in secret teaching at the K. Malczewska Lyceum, and in October 1939 joined the military underground. She joined the military wing of the Polish Secret State, subsequently renamed Service for Poland's Victory (SZP), Union for Armed Struggle (ZWZ) and later the Home Army (AK). After receiving training, she was put in charge of a foreign ciphers cell of the Chief Chancellery and SZP Headquarters Ciphers Bureau, later the KG ZWZ-AK Foreign Ciphers Bureau of Underground Communications Department V. In the AK rank of captain, she ran the Foreign Ciphers Bureau and maintained contact with undergrounded organisations within occupied Poland as well as the Polish government in exile – first in Paris, and later in London. She was entrusted with such a responsible post on account of her exceptional character traits: self-discipline, self-control, Benedictine patience and a deep sense of responsibility for the fate of those in need. In the early 1950s, she described the exciting work of her cell in a short story entitled A Clean Home (Czyste mieszkanie). It portrayed the work of her female collaborators against the dramatic backdrop of wartime day-to-day realities.

Little is known about her underground activities. After the war, she revealed herself, stating that she had worked in the Bureau of Information and Propaganda. In the National Institute of Remembrance archives, we only find a statement that she was ‘the head of an AK Headquarters cipher cell, and next in WIN [Freedom and Independence].’ Nothing is known about her activities in WIN.

She divided her life during wartime between work in the underground resistance and creative writing. During the occupation (1943–1944), she wrote a novel about Norwid, Harvest on the sickle (Żniwo na sierpie), presenting the poet as the nation's educator, who through his actions emphasised that rather than valour, equality, tolerance and freedom were the ideals of social life. With this controversial interpretation, she tried show a different understanding of Polishness, and also provoke a discussion about C.K. Norwid's attitude as an antidote to the difficult times of the occupation. A similar role was assigned to a later novel – The form of this world is passing away (Przemija postać świata) (1954), which she wrote as antidote to Stalinism. She completed the novel about Norwid shortly before the start of the Warsaw Uprising; the manuscript survived and was published in 1947, thus beginning the Polish theme in her writings.

After the outbreak of the Uprising, she joined a communications unit in the district of Wola, then in the Old Town and later Śródmieście. She was in active service to the end, leaving burning Warsaw on 3 October 1944 together with the civilian population. The destruction of the capital remained an important turning point for her, revealing the fragility of civilization and the heroism of society. She spent several days in the transit camp but avoided being deported to do forced labour in Germany. She was awarded the Cross of Valour for her participation in the Uprising.

== Kraków period ==
After the war, she settled with her mother in Kraków and returned to her teaching profession, teaching history at the State Commercial Secondary School in Kraków in the years 1945–1947.

In 1945 – as by then a renowned name in literature, the author of awarded novels – she joined a group centred around Fr Jan Piwowarczyk and Jerzy Turowicz which was planning to revive the Catholic press in Kraków. She participated in the meetings of the founding fathers of Tygodnik Powszechny, where, starting from the second issue, for over a year (1/7/45 to 5/8/46), she wrote a weekly column entitled ‘Today’ (Dziś), analysing the everyday lives of Poles from the moral perspective.

From the outset of her Kraków period, Malewska became active in several fields simultaneously: as a journalist, she wrote in the Catholic press of the time (chiefly Tygodnik Powszechny, the monthly Znak, Tygodnik Warszawski, Królowa Apostołów and the Poznań Życie Literackie); as a prose writer, she published short stories or fragments of novels she was still writing; as a historian, she collected sources for a gothic tale and in preparation of her written but never published Anthology of Medieval Culture (Antologa kultury średniowiecznej); as an editor, from September 1946, she worked as the editor-in-chief of the newly formed monthly Znak.

In Malewska's journalism, we may distinguish three periods: 1945–1951, 1955–1960 and 1961–1983. In the first period, after years of enforced silence, she threw herself into the whirlwind journalism, which at the time took precedence over her other literary activities: translation and editing. She engaged in sharp polemics, writing extensive articles and numerous reviews condemning the foundations of secular humanism (‘The lineage of humanism’, Tygodnik Warszawski, 1945, No. 1; ‘Modern Humanism’, Tygodnik Warszawski. 1946, No. 1; Dziś: ‘Human Criteria’, Tygodnik Powszechny, 1946, No. 5). The themes she dealt with can be divided into five categories: investigating worldviews (essays disputing Marxism), pedagogics, completing her Anthology of Medieval Culture, her Warsaw Uprising memoirs and her aphoristic writings, limited to short forms of expression. In 1948, she began writing a gnomic type of prose in a column of the Kraków weekly entitled ‘Notes’ (Uwagi), which expressed moral and didactic ideas. The sixth and final edition of ‘Notes’, entitled ‘Perfect Joy’, was published in 1952 (No. 51-51).

The years 1952–1954 marked a departure from current affairs journalism and instead, Malewska focused on writing her gothic epic, which was set in the declining Roman Empire of the 6th century. Despite the impending doom, Christianity inspired optimism by demanding the rebuilding a new civilization and a faith in the good forces concealed within humanity. The fall of the Roman Empire under the barbarian devastation may have seemed like the end of the world, but thanks to the work of the Benedictines, Europe was to be reborn. Malewska's description of this momentous turning point may be seen as a reference to the Second World War in two ways, from the perspective of her own wartime experiences, but also from the point of view of historical documents. This dramatic tale, entitled The form of this world is passing away (Przemija postać świata) was published in 1954, in the Socialist Realism period, and placed her among the most renowned Polish authors.

In the years 1955–1960, aware of the importance of her writing, she changed her artistic style and started publishing series of longer essays. The second half of the 1950s was a time of changing viewpoints and forms of expression, more reflective journalism, inclined towards philosophical thought, removed from current affairs, the very lifeblood of normal journalism, and avoiding occasional texts, apart from ones concerning religion or the Warsaw Uprising.

== Znak ==
The third phase began in 1961 with a fuller engagement in managing a rejuvenated team of journalists at Znak and lasted until her death in 1983. She made public comments very rarely in this period, limiting her literary activity to successive books and translations. Journalistic comments basically replaced her translations.

Malewska was part of the Tygodnik Powszechny group from which the idea of creating the Znak monthly emerged. She participated in discussions on the periodical's profile together with Stefan Swieżawski, Stefania Skwarczyńska, Jerzy Turowicz and Stanisław Stomma – the people behind the final decision for it to become a religious and philosophical journal. She became one of the chief architects, influencing its direction.

Malewska edited Znak from its first issue. She co-managed the editorial office with S. Stomma from the third, September–December 1946, issue. The journal's direction was determined by: S. Skwarczyńska (‘Człowiek zagubiony w Świecie’ [Man lost in the world], Znak, No. 1), Fr Konstanty Michalski (‘Dokąd idziemy?’ [Where are we going?], Znak, 1946, No. 1), J. Turowicz (‘W stronę uspołecznienia’ [Towards socialization], Znak, 1946, No. 1), S. Swieżawski (‘Dlaczego tomizm?’ [Why Thomism?], Znak. 1946, No. 2). In the third issue, the editorial policy line was supplemented by new editors-in-chief (S. Stomma, ‘Maksymalne i minimalne tendencje społeczne katolików’ [Maximal and minimal Catholic social tendencies]; H. Malewska, ‘Faryzeizm’ [Pharisaism], Znak, 1946, No. 3). The thus ideologically delineated periodical attracted academics, theologians and philosophers to cooperate in creating an important intellectual journal open to Western Christian culture.

Znak became a chief concern in Malewska's life, she engaged in her editorial work with great dedication and industriousness. On its pages, she published many notes, translations from English and French as well as her own articles. On her own initiative, insofar as the censorship would permit, she would publicly react to current affairs, the consequences of the dropping of the bomb or the antisemitic pogrom in Kielce. Her personally edited column ‘Events – Books – People’ – in a time when information was rationed – provided the latest news from what was broadly termed the world of culture.

From the spring of 1953, after the closing of Znak (the last issue, No. 35, appeared in February 1953), Malewska remained for three years without a regular income. In 1955, she took up work as an archivist at the Kórnik Library. There she sorted 17th-century miscellanea, including letters, private notes and noble family silvae rerum (home chronicles) which were used in her later works on the 17th century: Old Polish Letters from the Vasa Era (1959) and The Leszczyński Lords (1961). It was also from that time that she was inspired later to write Family Apocrypha (1965), in which the author narrates in a new factual way a Polish intelligentsia family history of several generations. In the early 1950s, Malewska started cooperating with the Laski Centre for the Blind, near Warsaw, run by the Franciscan Sisters, Servants of the Cross.

Published in 1956, Sir Thomas More Refuses was a volume of historical novels written by Malewska in the years 1937–1955. The title may be perceived as the author's personal credo, and the collection as her comment on the confrontation of secular politics with the Catholic Church. In October 1956, she was one of the founding members of the All-Polish Club of Progressive Catholic Intelligentsia. In December that year, she became an editorial board member of the reactivated Tygodnik Powszechny. At the start of the second phase of her journalistic activity up until 1960, she published series of essays about writer's ethics and the theory of knowledge, including a text entitled ‘On Responsibility’ (Tygodnik Powszechny, 1957, No. 17), where paraphrasing William Faulkner, she declared: ‘Nothing can destroy the good writer, and the only thing that could possibly alter him is death.’ In 1957, she again joined Znak, which was then reactivated under Editor-in-Chief Jacek Woźniakowski. Next, she travelled to London, where among other things she held an author's evening at the Gen. W. Sikorski Historical Institute.

In November 1960, she returned to the position of editor-in-chief at Znak, replacing J. Woźniakowski, who was now delegated to work at the Znak Social Publishing Institute. At the start of the 1960s, she increased the volume of the magazine as well as its circulation (to 7,000), aspiring not only for continuation but also expansion, to cater more fully to the growing needs of the Polish intelligentsia. This second period of being editor-in-chief at Znak coincided with great reforms of the Catholic Church, in particular, the Second Vatican Council. Under her supervision, the periodical became renowned for its high level of debate concerning renewal in the Church and the disseminated teachings of the council. It published the first Polish translations of the council's documents with commentaries, as well as the texts of the most outstanding Catholic theologians. Malewska especially valued the courage and achievements of Pope John XXIII.

In the 1960s, her presence on the pages of Znak was marked not so much by her writings as by her editorial work. She was called the master of internal critique regarding texts submitted to the editorial office. At work, she adhered to the principle that more should be expected of intellectuals. With her authority and sheer personality, she attracted authors, such as: Józef Tischner, Roman Ingarden, Miron Białoszewski, Roman Brandstaetter, Władysław Tatarkiewicz and Henryk Elzenberg, among others. She translated and promoted foreign authors, including Jacques Maritain, Emmanuel Mounier, Simone Weil, Dietrich Bonhoeffer, Georges Bernanos, Gilbert Keith Chesterton, Yves Marie-Joseph Congar, Marie-Dominique Chenu, Henri de Lubac, Jean Daniélou, Christopher Dawson, Mircea Eliade, Thomas Stearns Eliot, Romano Guardini, Martin Heidegger, Hans Küng, Thomas Merton, Erwin Panofsky, Karl Popper, Karl Rahner and Ludwig Wittgenstein.

The entirety of Malewska's prose writings, which became rarer with time, may be divided into three intertwining themes: ancient, medieval and matters concerning Poland. In terms of narrative and composition style, there were two periods: traditional and experimental. The first period began with her earliest writings and ended in 1956, most notably with her gothic novel of 1954 and the collection of tales in Sir Tomasz More Refuses. Her second period ended with her fictional diptych Labyrinth and LLW, or What May Happen Tomorrow published in 1970. These pieces were written in two distinct styles. The first was a poetic prose description of the beginnings of civilization, whereas the second was more like a dystopic thriller, set in the future. After the publication of her diptych, exhausted by illness, she consciously put away her pen and stopped writing.

== Later life and death ==
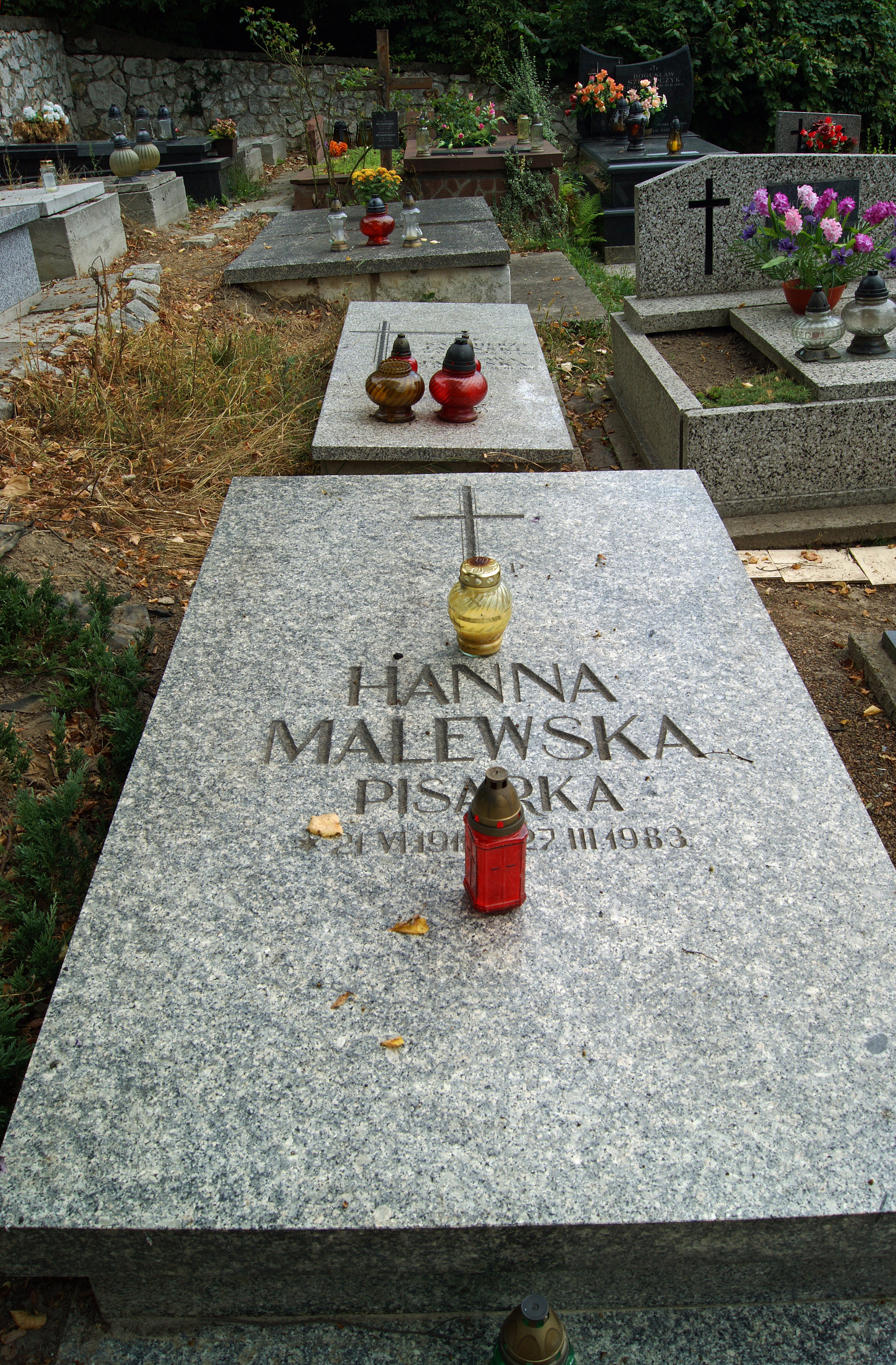
The grave of Malewska

In 1973, as a result of her deteriorating health, she retired, appointing Bohdan Cywiński from Warsaw as her successor. Hanna Malewska had been a total editor-in-chief on whom the whole editorial team relied. The change of editors-in-chief marked a new phase in the editorial history of Znak, coinciding with changes in the magazine's mid-1970s readership.

At the turn of 1975 and 1976, she signed the Letter of 59 – the memorial of intellectuals protesting against changes in the Constitution of the Polish People's Republic and appealing against the repressions of Polish workers in Radom and Ursus. In 1978, she became involved in a series of talks in the Scientific Courses Society. In 1979, she supported the student initiative to dissolve the Socialist Union of Polish Students at the Jagiellonian University and to establish a new independent organisation in its place.

After October 1956, as well as in the 1970s and 1980s, she received many awards, including: the Order of Polonia Restituta Knight's Cross (1957), the Fr Maksymilian Kolbe and Reinhold Schneider Award in Freiburg (1972), the Alfred Jurzykowski Prize in New York (1976), Order of Polonia Restituta Officer's Cross (1976) and the City of Kraków Award for lifetime achievement in literature (1981).

Malewska died on Palm Sunday, 27 March 1983, of tuberculosis that was diagnosed too late. She was buried in Tyniec Cemetery near the Benedictine Abbey.
