= Gdynia Literary Prize =

Polish literary prize

- Awarded for: best books written in Polish published in the previous year
- Country: Poland
- Presented by: Mayor of Gdynia
- Reward: PLN 50,000 ($13,000)
- First award: 2006
- Website: https://nagrodaliterackagdynia.pl/

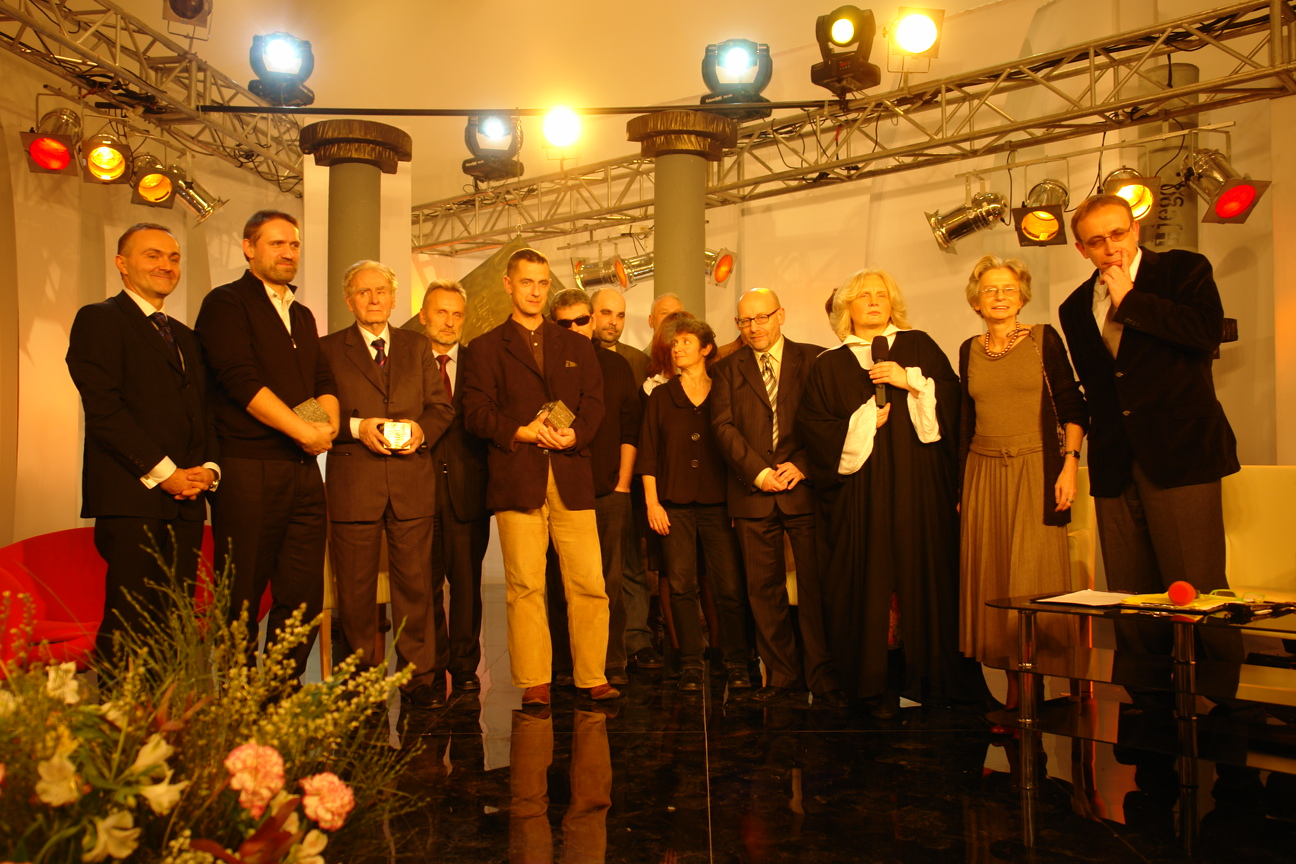
Grand Gala GLP, 2007

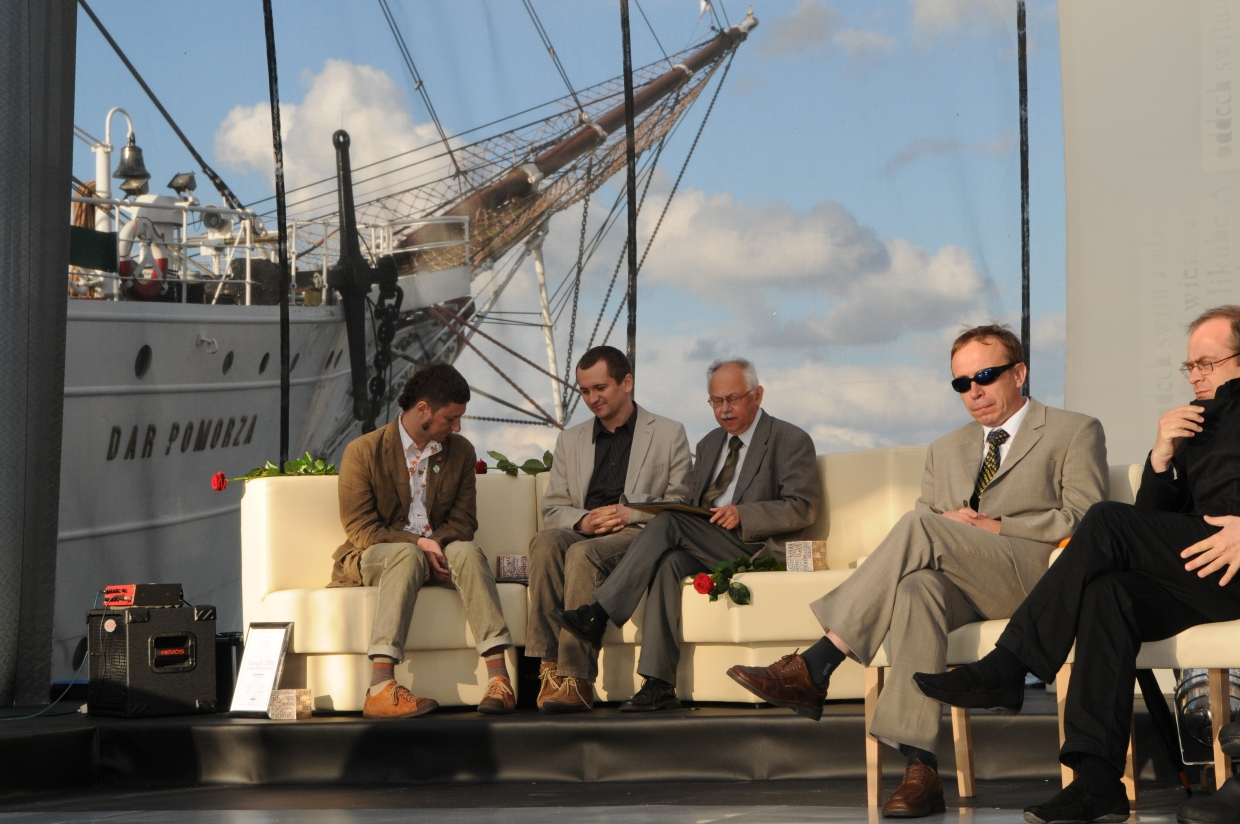
Prize winners of GLP during the 2008 Grand Gala (from left: Adam Wiedemann, Piotr Marecki (who collected prize on behalf of Marian Pankowski) oraz Piotr Matywiecki)

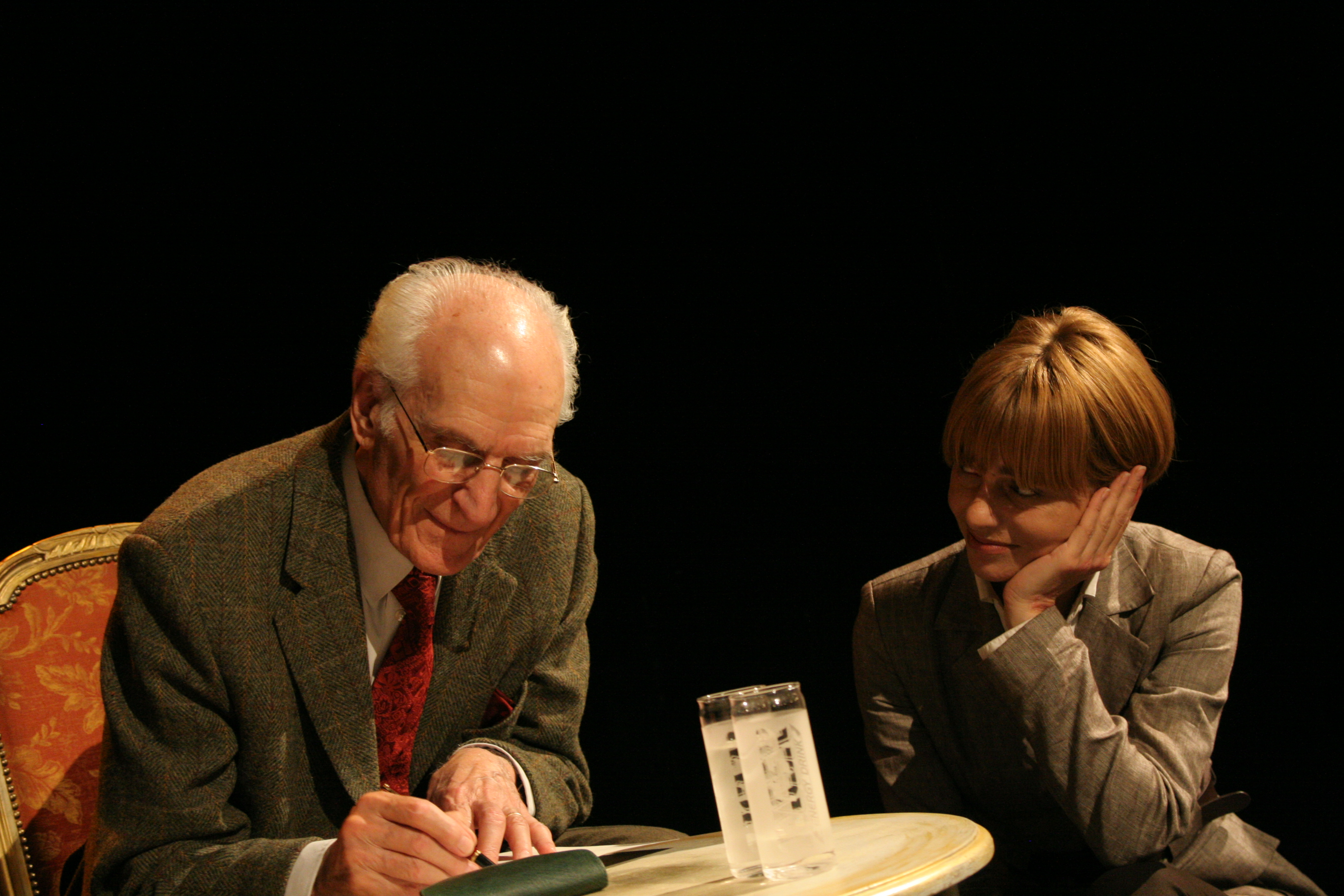
Marian Pankowski during The Autumn Meetings with Winners of the GLP, 2008

Gdynia Literary Prize (Polish: Nagroda Literacka Gdynia) is a Polish literary prize, which is awarded annually to authors of the best books published in the previous year in the prose, poetry, essay and (since 2014) translation categories.

It was established in 2006 by Wojciech Szczurek, mayor of Gdynia, who stated that "The idea of Gdynia Literary Prize is to honour unique achievements of contemporary Polish authors which shall determine a strong and also permanent impulse to further intensify activities in literature and art in its broad meaning".

The list of nominees is announced in May during the International Book Fair (Międzynarowe Targi Książki) in Warsaw. The prizes which consist of the "Literature Cube" statuette and 50.000 PLN are presented at the Grand Gala in June in Gdynia. Since 2008 the Grand Gala is accompanied by Literaturomanie Days of Gdynia Literary Prize (Literaturomanie Dni Nagrody Literackiej Gdynia). Moreover, at the turn of October and November, The Autumn Meetings with Winners of the Gdynia Literary Prize take place.

Public City Library (Miejska Biblioteka Publiczna) in Gdynia publishes Literary Supplement. Gdynia Literary Prize Newspaper magazine.

== Chapter ==
Choices of both the nominees and winners is done by the members of GLP Chapter consisting of prominent experts. The members are: Agata Bielik-Robson, Marek Bieńczyk, Jerzy Jarniewicz, Zbigniew Kruszyński, Małgorzata Łukasiewicz, Aleksander Nawarecki, Violetta Trella (Chapter’s secretary) and chairman Piotr Śliwiński.

In previous years the members were: Alina Brodzka-Wald, Piotr Sommer, Paweł Śpiewak and Elżbieta Gwiazdowska (Chapter's secretary).

== Prize winners ==
edition	date	prose	poetry	essay
1	7 December 2006	Lubiewo Michał Witkowski	Dzieje rodzin polskich Eugeniusz Tkaczyszyn-Dycki	Zamiast Marek Zaleski
2	29 November 2007	Traktat o łuskaniu fasoli Wiesław Myśliwski	Pełne morze Wojciech Bonowicz	Projekt handlu kabardyńskimi końmi Krzysztof Środa
3	14 June 2008	Ostatni zlot aniołów Marian Pankowski	Pensum Adam Wiedemann	Twarz Tuwima Piotr Matywiecki
4	13 June 2009	Jedenaście Marcin Świetlicki	Piosenka o zależnościach i uzależnieniach Eugeniusz Tkaczyszyn-Dycki	Inne obrazy Maria Poprzęcka
5	19 June 2010	Taksim Andrzej Stasiuk	Dwa fiaty Justyna Bargielska	Ciała Sienkiewicza Ryszard Koziołek
6	18 June 2011	Obsoletki Justyna Bargielska	Pogłos Ewa Lipska	Samobójstwo jako doświadczenie wyobraźni Stefan Chwin
7	30 June 2012	Włoskie szpilki Magdalena Tulli	Rezydencja surykatek Marta Podgórnik	Opis krainy Gog Marian Sworzeń
8	22 June 2013	Ocalenie Atlantydy Zyta Oryszyn	Sylwetki i cienie Andrzej Sosnowski	Sprawiedliwość na końcu języka. Czytanie Waltera Benjamina Adam Lipszyc
9	24 June 2014	Wiele demonów Jerzy Pilch	Jeden Marcin Świetlicki	Salki Wojciech Nowicki
10	5 September 2015	Zawsze jest dzisiaj Michał Cichy	Wyrazy uznania Piotr Janicki	Boski Bach Piotr Wierzbicki
11	10 September 2016	Skoruń Maciej Płaza	Nice Barbara Klicka	Droga 816 Michał Książek
12	2 September 2017	Pieczeń dla Amfy Salcia Hałas	Schrony Michał Sobol	Koło miejsca/Elementarz Krzysztof Siwczyk
13	31 August 2018	Mikrotyki Paweł Sołtys	Pawilony Dominik Bielecki	Rękopis znaleziony na ścianie Krzysztof Mrowcewicz

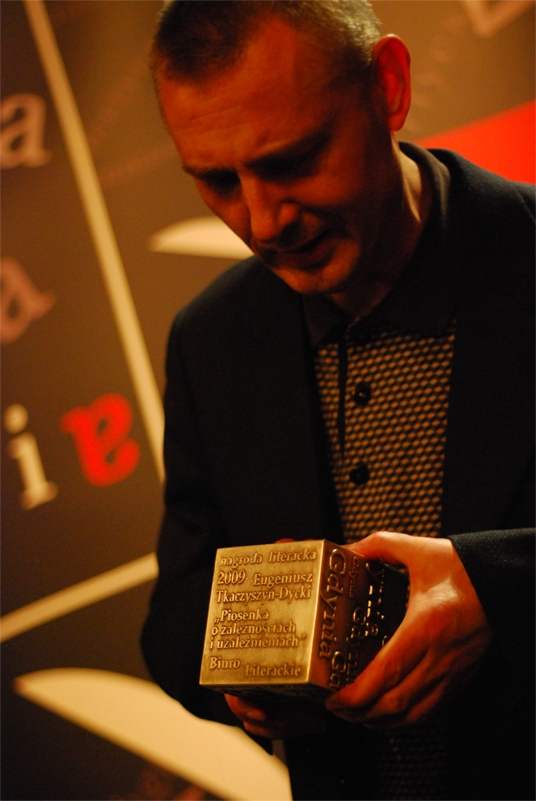
Eugeniusz Tkaczyszyn-Dycki, GLP's A.D. 2009 prize winner (poetry)

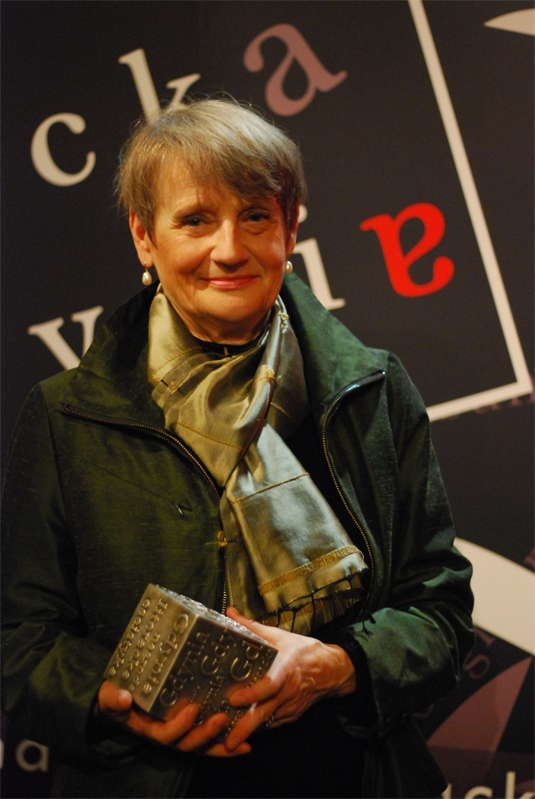
Maria Poprzęcka, GLP's A.D. 2009 prize winner (essay)

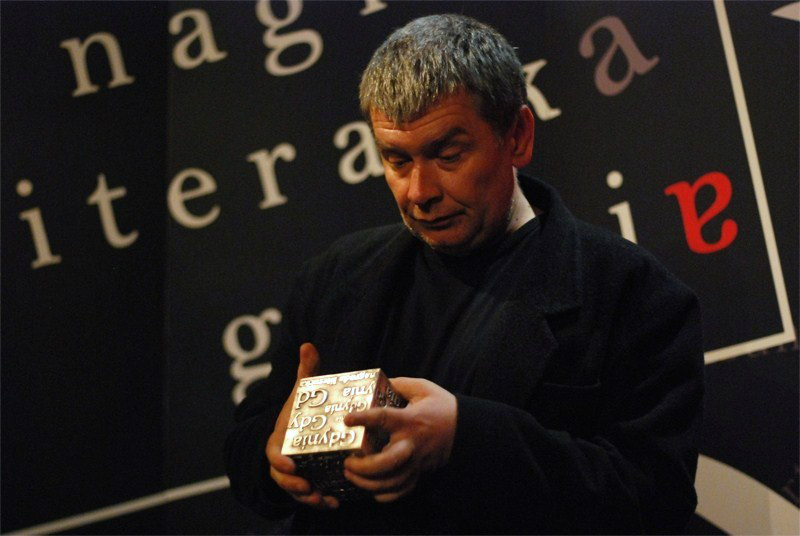
Marcin Świetlicki, GLP's A.D. 2009 prize winner (prose)

== „Literaturomanie” Days of Gdynia Literary Prize ==
„Literaturomanie” Days of Gdynia Literary Prize (pl:Dni Nagrody Literackiej Gdynia „Literaturomanie”) - is the full name of two-day festival which debuted in 2008. „Literaturomanie” is the first big, annual literary event in Tricity.

The event is meant for the enthusiasts of high culture in varied literary genres (poetry, prose, essay and commentary). Its goal is to enable the audience to meet with recognized authors with similar profiles of ambitious, contemporary literature (by trend, views, age, sex etc.). The guests who are invited conduct discussions, with each other and with the audience, on the most actual themes. The prominent critics and journalists from patronizing media take care of meritocracy of the debates.

=== Previous edition of festival ===
year	date	place
2008	13–14 June	pl:Pomorski Park Naukowo-Technologiczny
2009	12–13 June	pl:Teatr Miejski im. Witolda Gombrowicza w Gdyni

=== Programs ===
==== 2008 ====
Program of “Literaturomanie” 2008 was full of numerous events, such as:

- Author. Author! – meetings with leading Polish authors (the guests were: Wiesław Myśliwski, Eustachy Rylski, Leszek Szaruga, Jacek Żakowski).
- Literary Debates of „Gdynia” – meetings with nominees and readings of fragments of their books.
- Gdynia Drama Prize – presentation of fragments of winning drama and conversation with author.
- Music event – free of charge (Świetliki).
- Open Tournament of One Poem – a combination of poetry and performance during which competitors present their works while the jury (Wojciech Boros, Wojciech Bonowicz oraz Tadeusz Dąbrowski) judge their performance and present the winners (in previous editions: Patryk Dziczek, Joanna Herman, Maciej Kotłowski, Natalia Malek, Anna Wieser, Mariusz Więcek).
- Special movie screenings – and meetings with their creators („Jegomość Tischner i jego filozofia po góralsku”, creators: Witold Bereś, Artur Więcek).
- Second-book Fair – where the best collections can be found.
- Gdynia Literary Prize Vademecum – book stand where books of the nominees can be bought and signatures with dedications can be obtained.
- Poetry Workshops – free of charge classes for 10-15 people which are held by one of prize winners of the previous edition (in 2008 workshops were held by Wojciech Bonowicz).

Moreover, during the festival there are many open debates held with prominent guests such as: Stefan Chwin, Piotr Kłoczowski, Stanisław Rosiek, Krzysztof Środa, Jacek Żakowski.

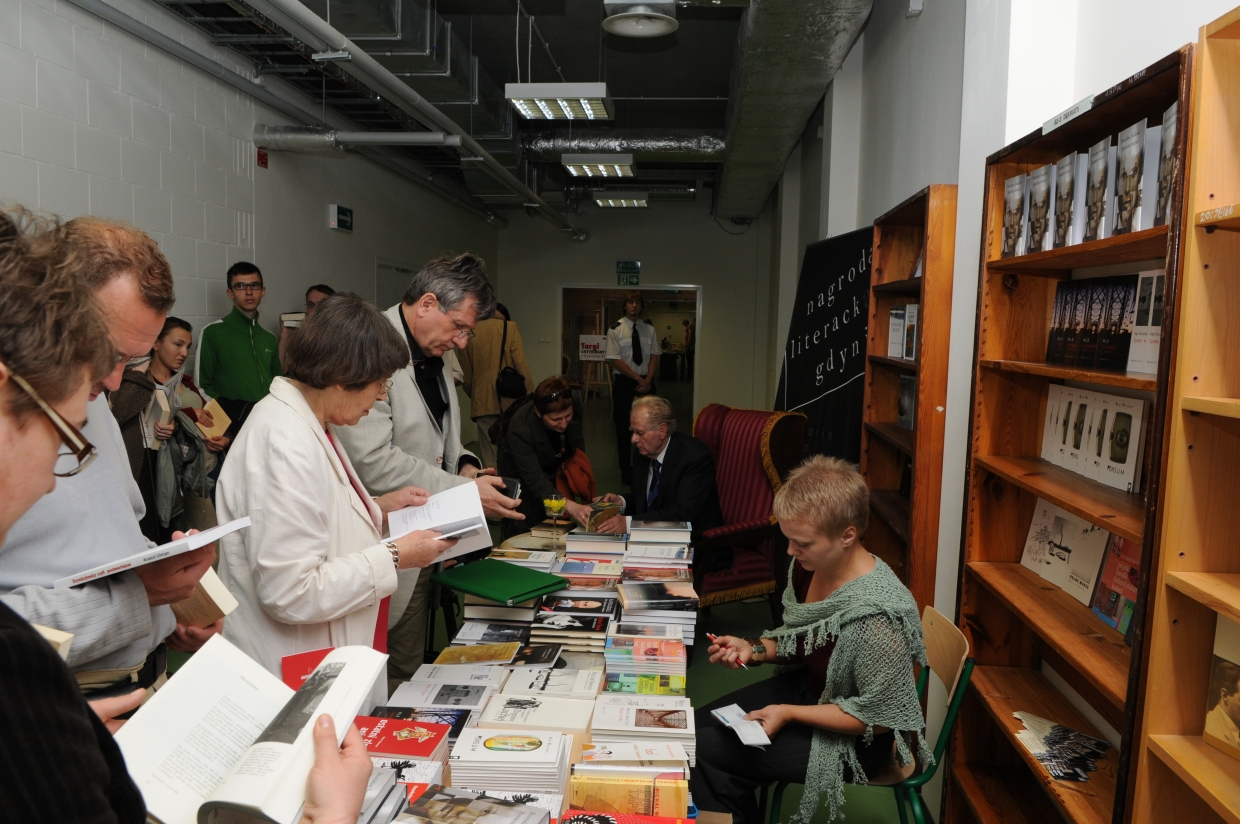
Vademecum GLP - in the background: Wiesław Myśliwski signing his books

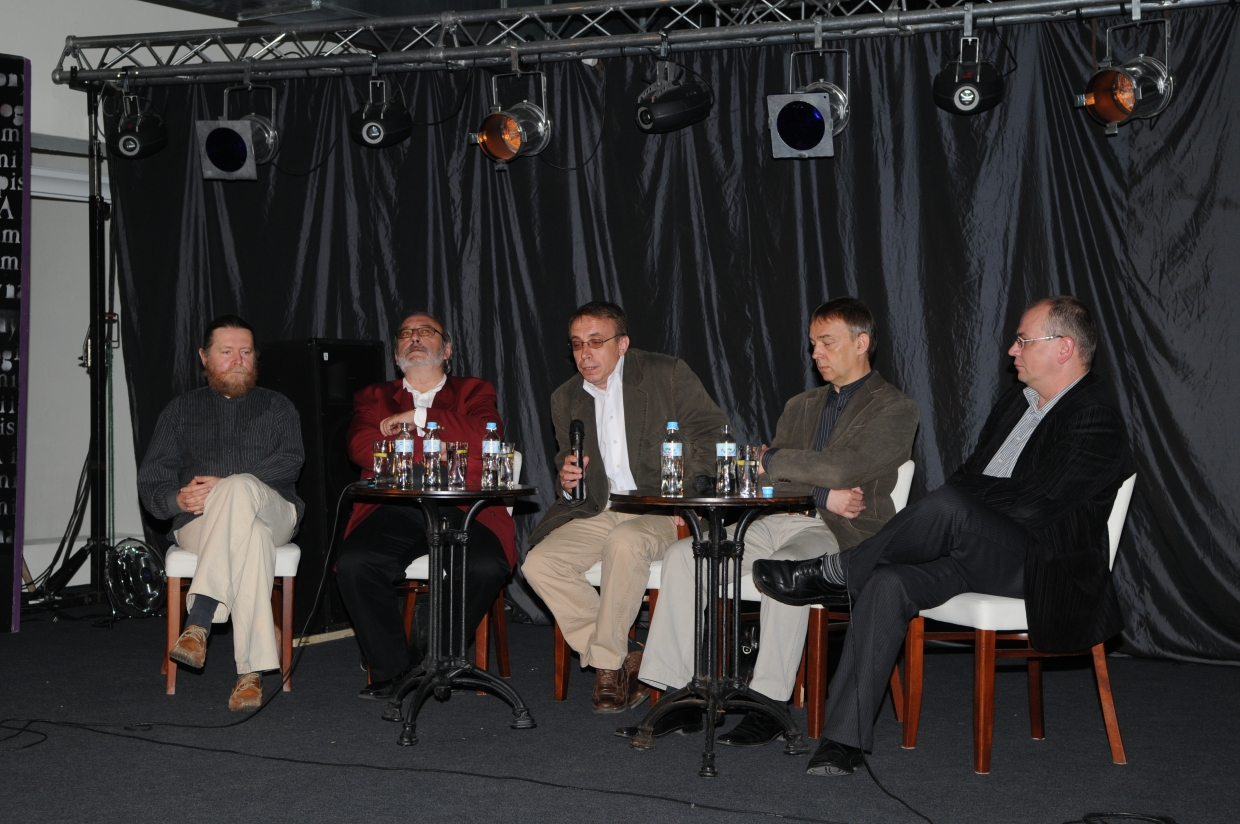
Chapter's members debate

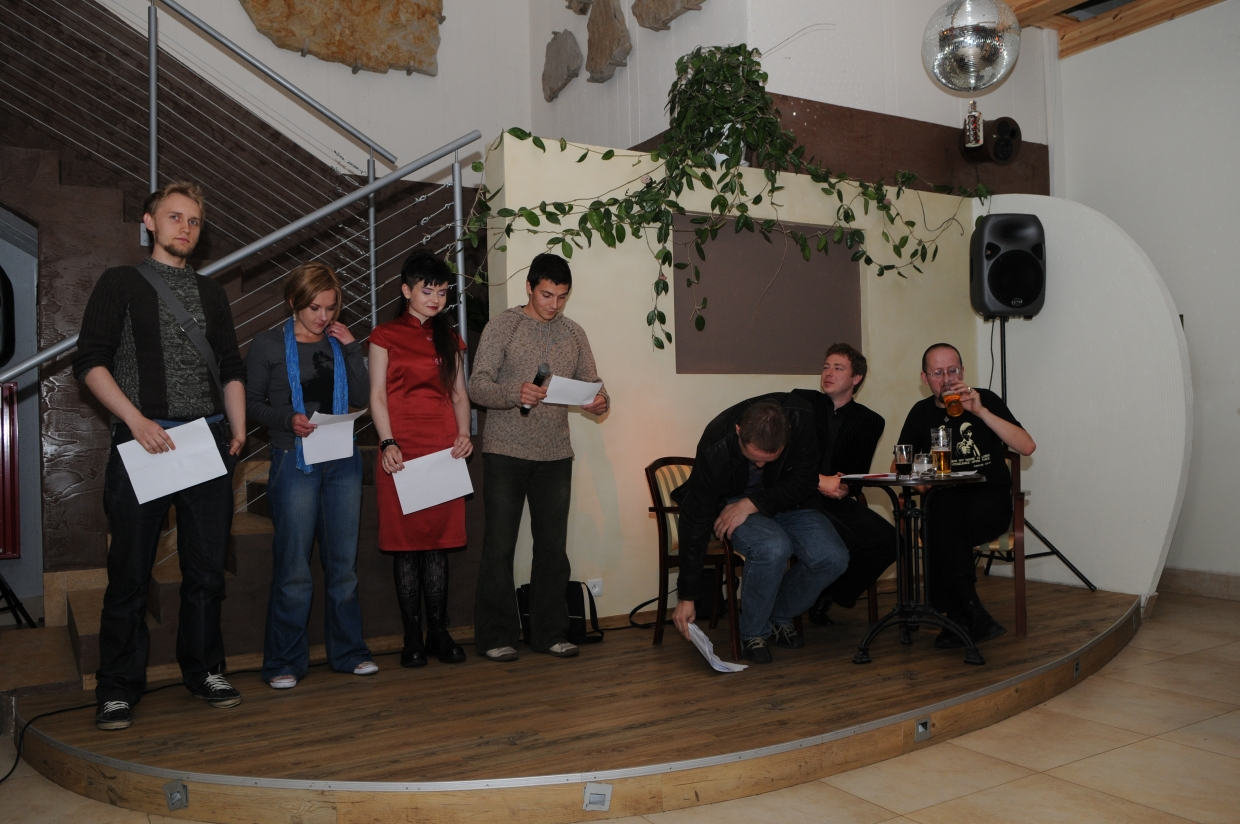
Open Tournament of One Poem

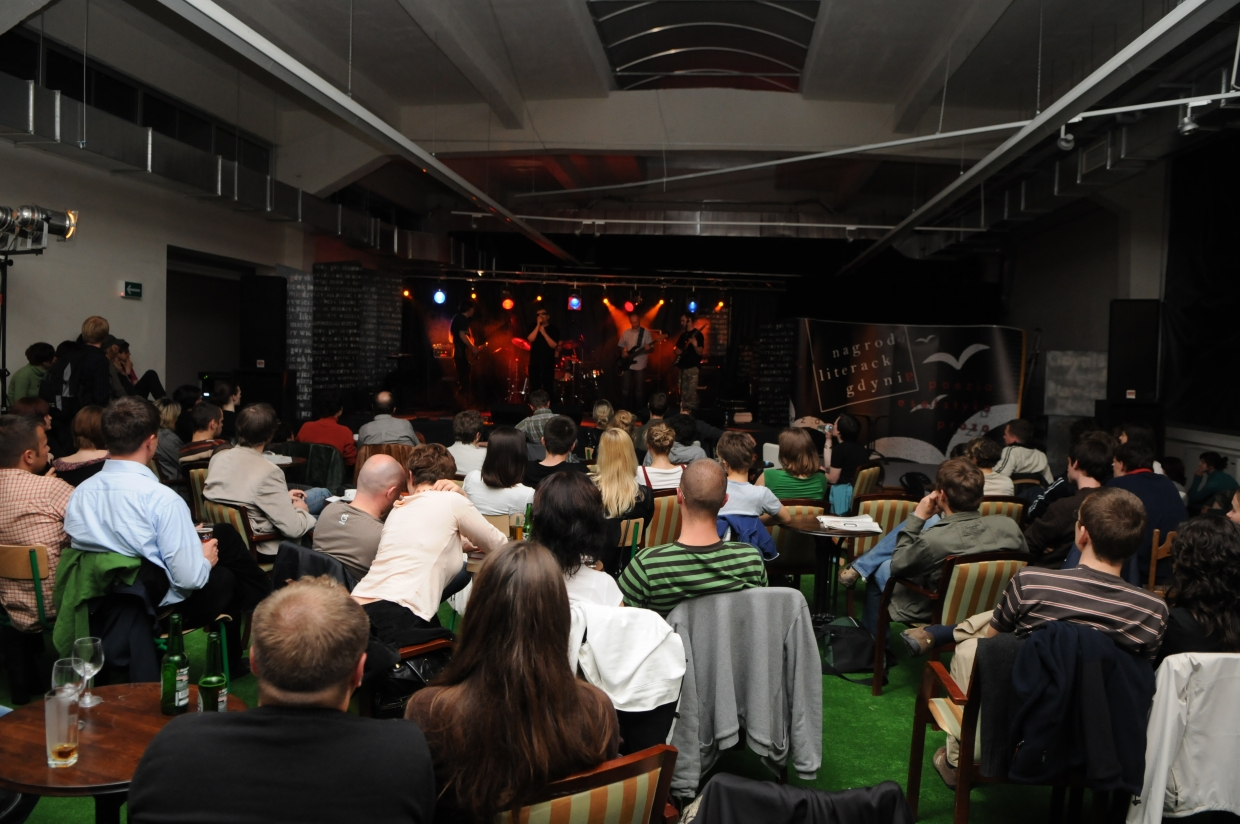
Świetliki performance during "Literarymania"

==== 2009 ====
In "Literaturomanie" 2009's program which took place on 12–13 June 2009 one could find:

- Author. Author! – meetings with leading Polish authors: Hanna Krall - meeting chaired by Paweł Huelle and Janusz Głowacki, chaired by - Remigiusz Grzela.
- Gdynia zaczytana - photos' exhibition.
- Gdynia Literary Prize Vademecum – book stand where books of the nominees can be bought and signatures with dedications can be obtained.
- Literary Debates of „Gdynia” - meetings with nominees chaired by literary critics and journalists: poetry - Michał Chaciński (TVP Kultura), prose - Andrzej Franaszek (Tygodnik Powszechny), essay - Łukasz Rudziński (trojmiasto.pl).
- pl:Mumio - performance and meeting with pl:Mumio.
- Open Tournament of One Poem – third edition; combination of poetry and performance; jury: Leszek Szaruga, Anna Sobecka and Wojciech Boros.
- Prose workshops – free of charge, two-day classes for 10 people, held by Leszek Szaruga
- Second-book fair.
- Two decades of Polish literature - debate on Polish literature after year 1989; participants: Przemysław Czapliński, Ewa Graczyk, Leszek Szaruga, Adam Wiedemann and Marek Zaleski.

the meeting was chaired by Dariusz Bugalski.

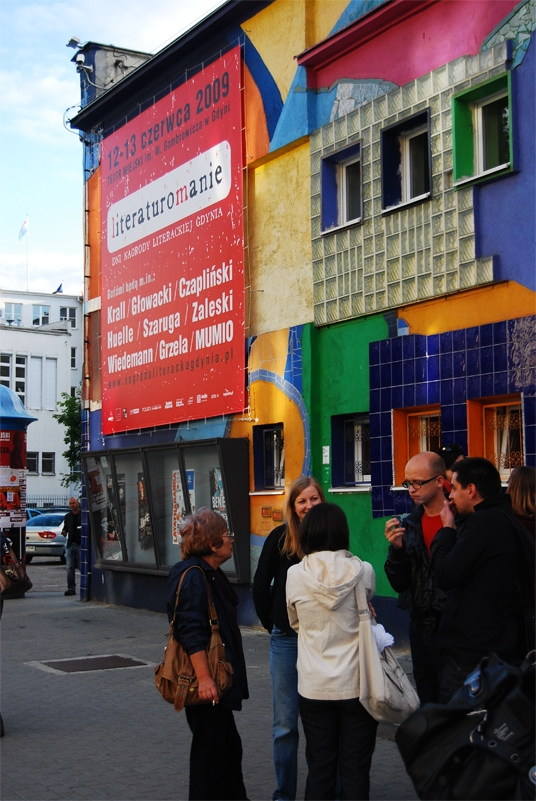
Literaturomanie 2009 in pl:Teatr Miejski im. Witolda Gombrowicza w Gdyni

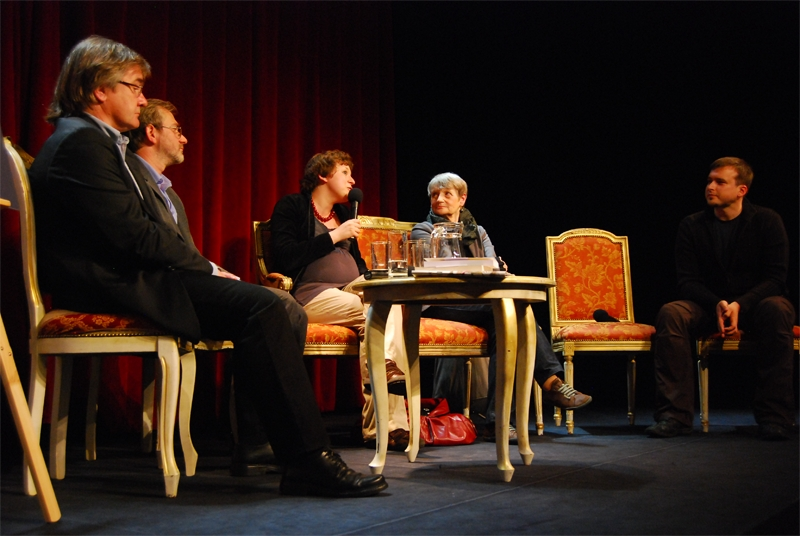
Literary Debate of "Gdynia" with nominees to NLG A.D. 2009 for essay

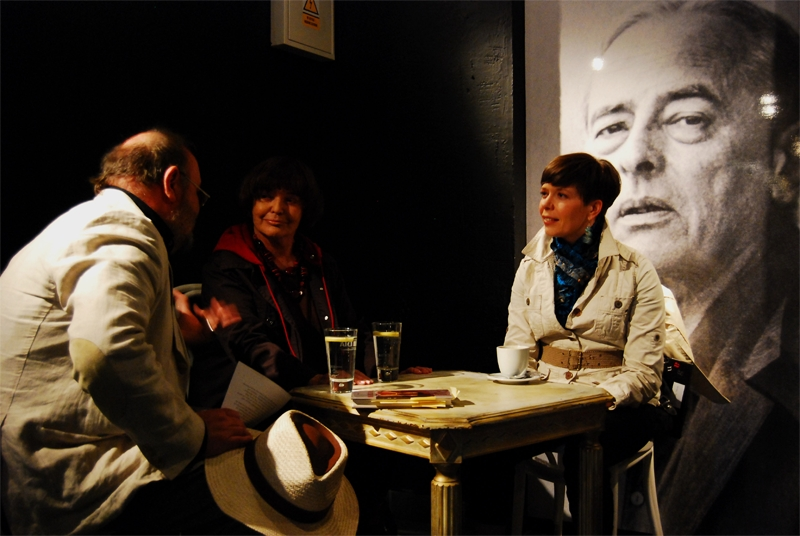
Hanna Krall, Paweł Huelle and Dorota Nowak

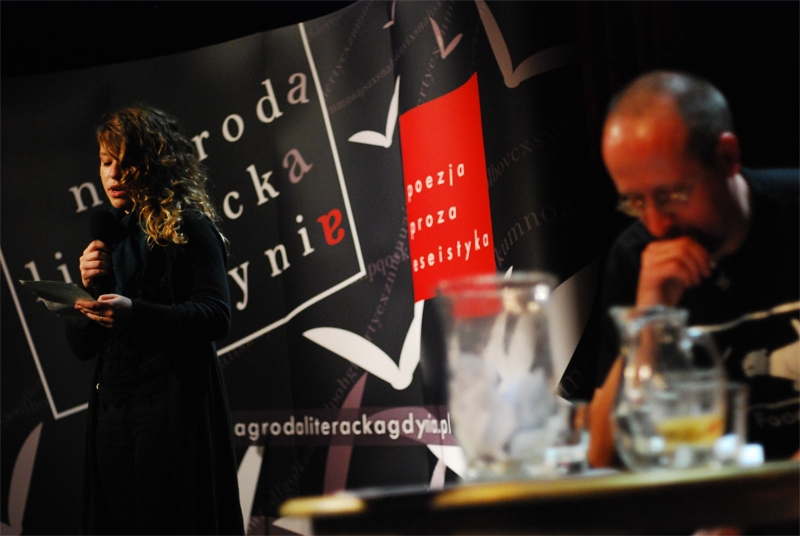
Open Tournament of One Poem

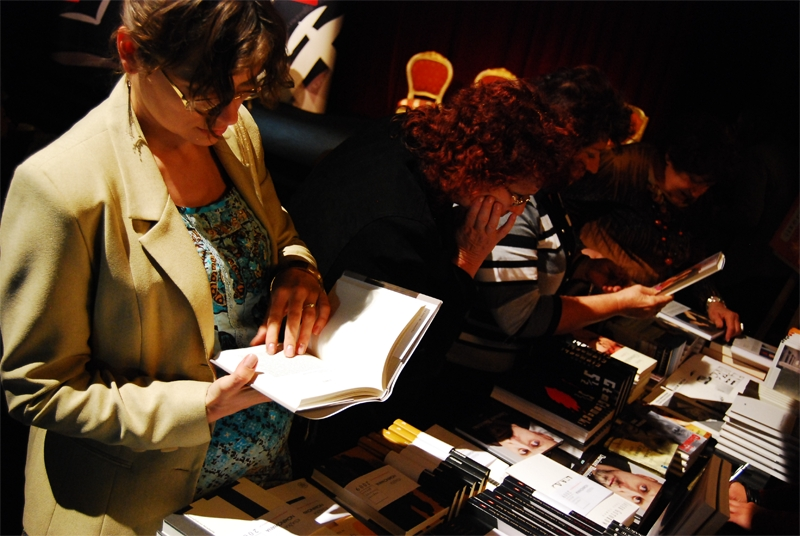
Literaturomanie 2009

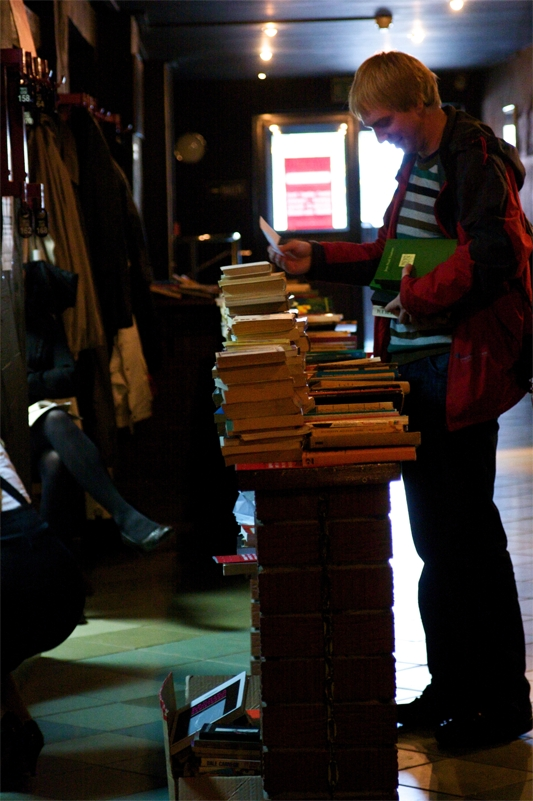
Second-book fair

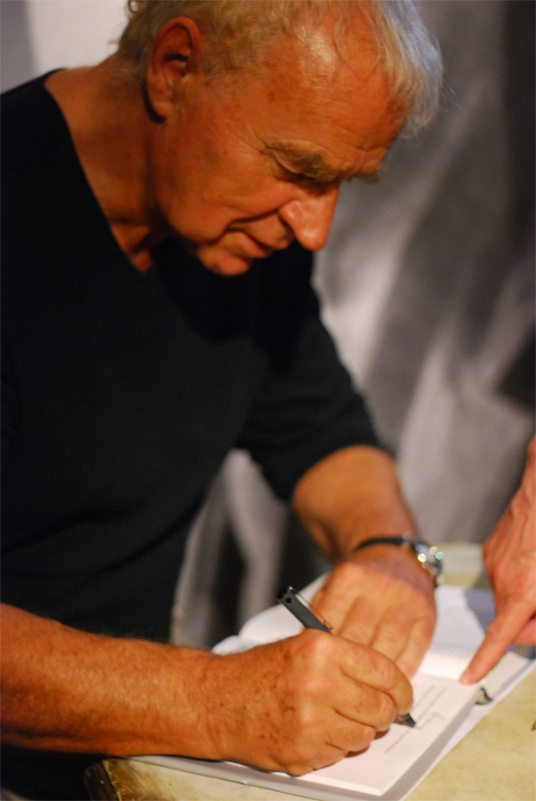
Janusz Głowacki signing his books

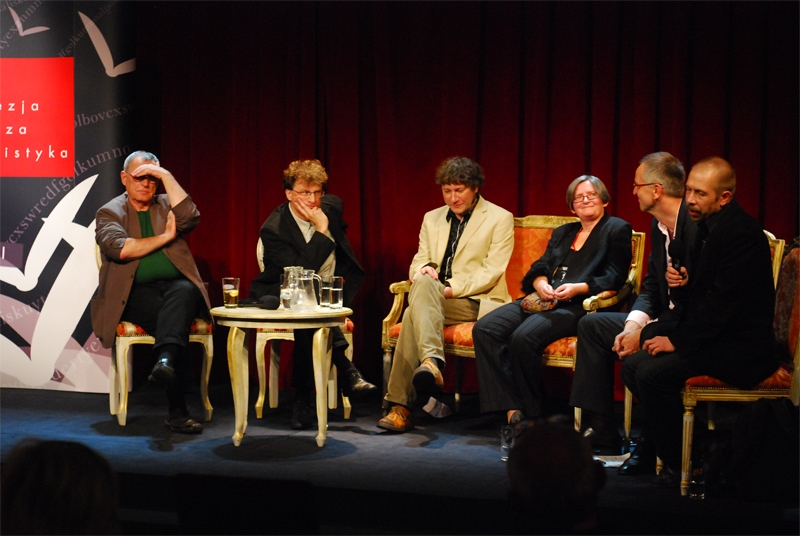
Debate "Two decades of Polish literature"

== The Autumn Meetings with Winners of the Gdynia Literary Prize ==
The Autumn Meetings with Winners of the Gdynia Literary Prize (Jesienne Spotkania z Laureatami Nagrody Literackiej Gdynia) – is an event that is held at the turn of October and November which enables further meeting of the enthusiast of culture and art with the Gdynia Literary Prize winners.

Autumn Meetings with „Literaturomanie” Days of Gdynia Literary Prize are platforms where the audience can participate in casual conversations abort literature and listen to interpretations of winners’ books

=== Previous editions ===
year	date	guests
2008	12th Nov	Adam Wiedemann (meeting and II Open Tournament of One Poem)
	13th Nov	Piotr Matywiecki (meeting and interpretations by Jerzy Radziwiłowicz)
	14th Nov	Marian Pankowski (meeting and interpretations by Krzysztof Majchrzak)
2009		TBA after presenting the winners of Gdynia Literary Prize 2009

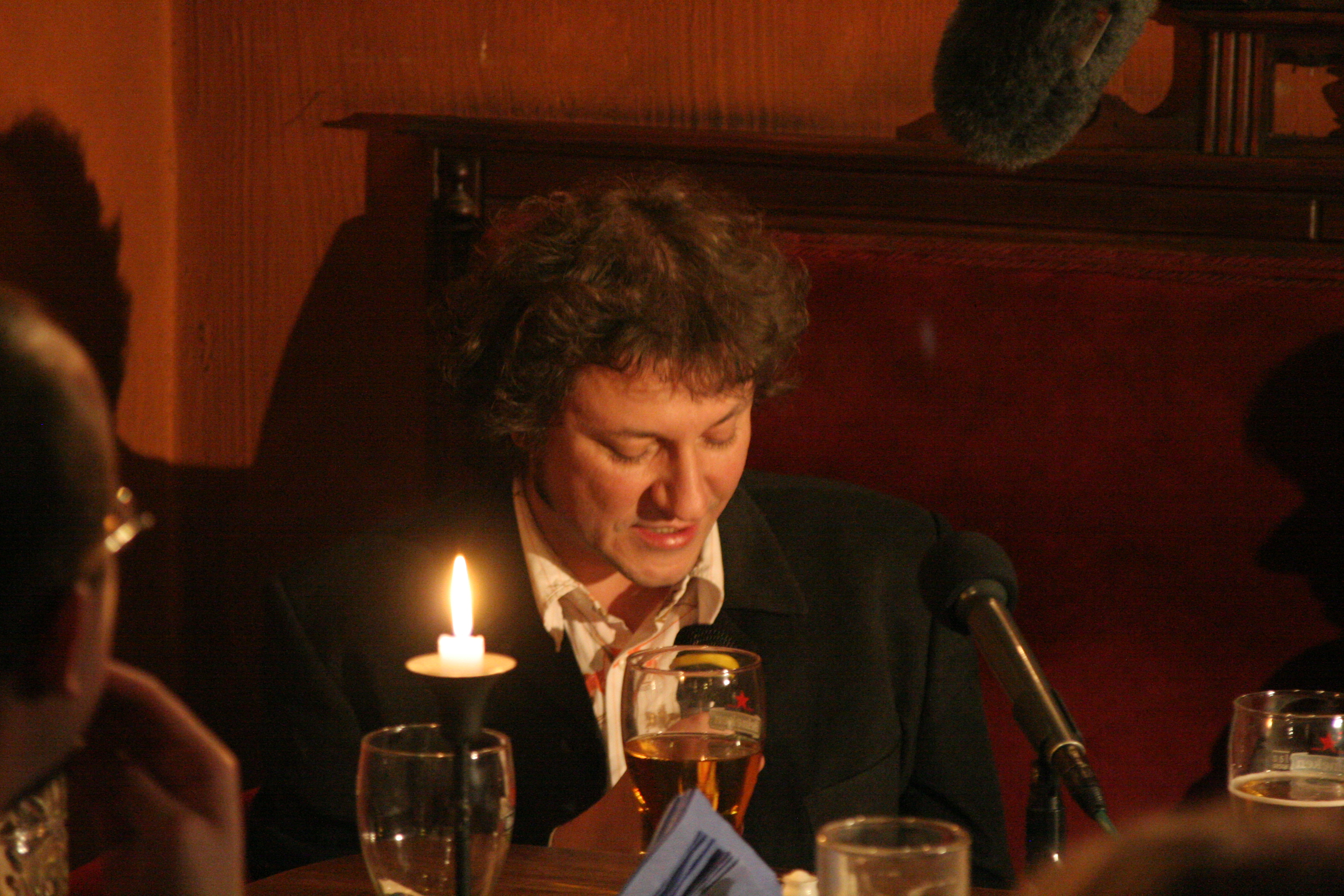
Adam Wiedemann - poetry prizewinner

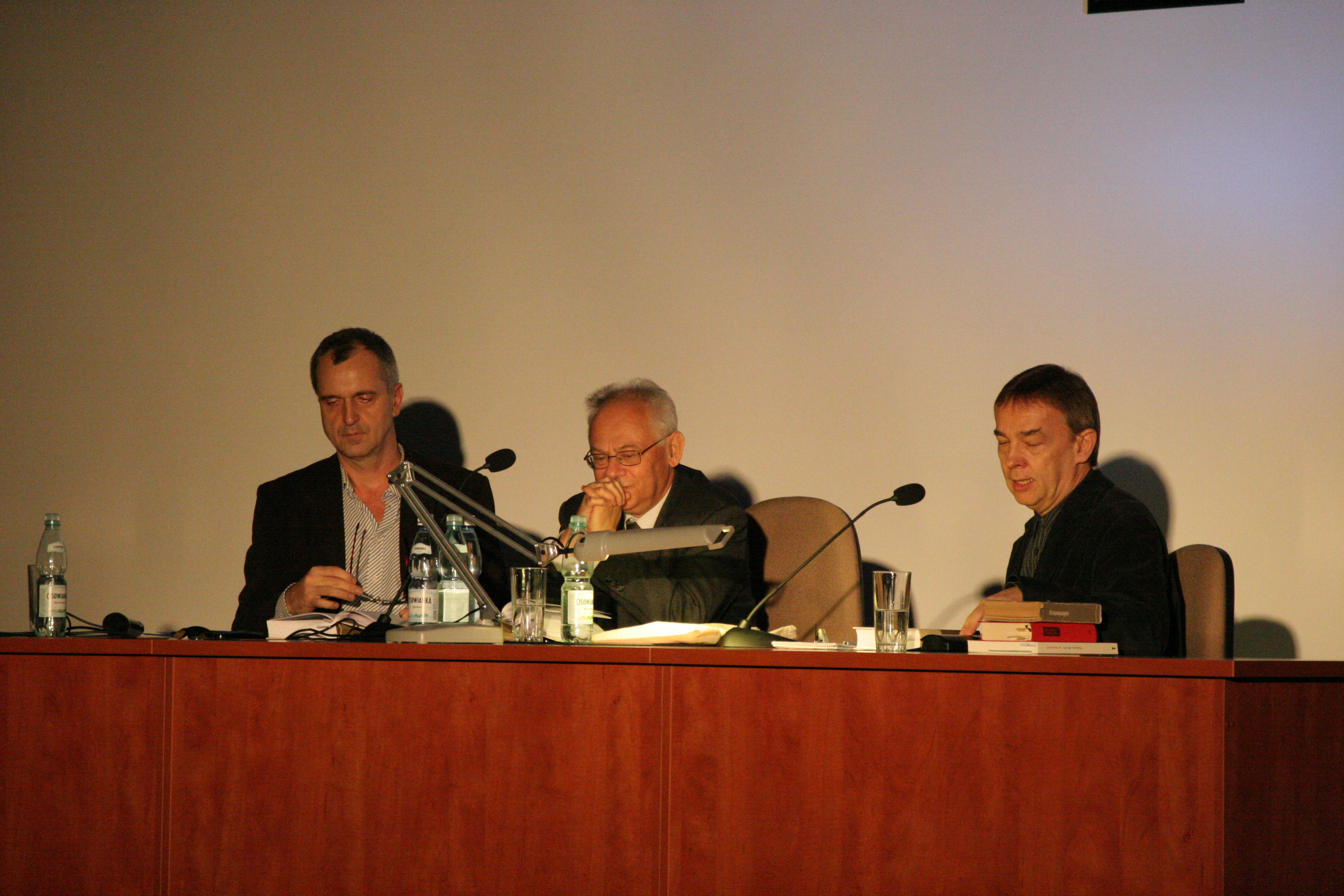
Piotr Matywiecki - essay prizewinner

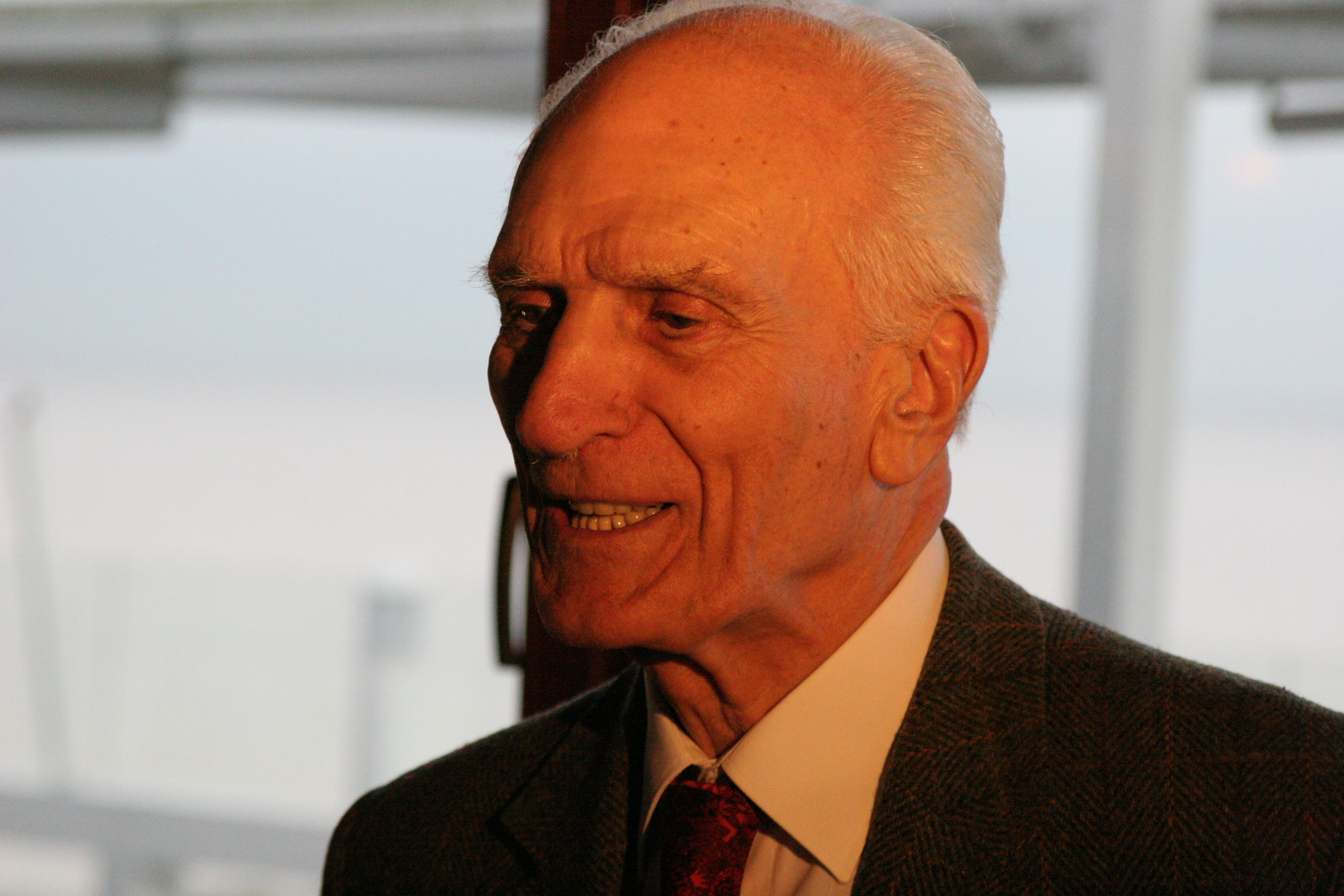
Marian Pankowski - prose prizewinner

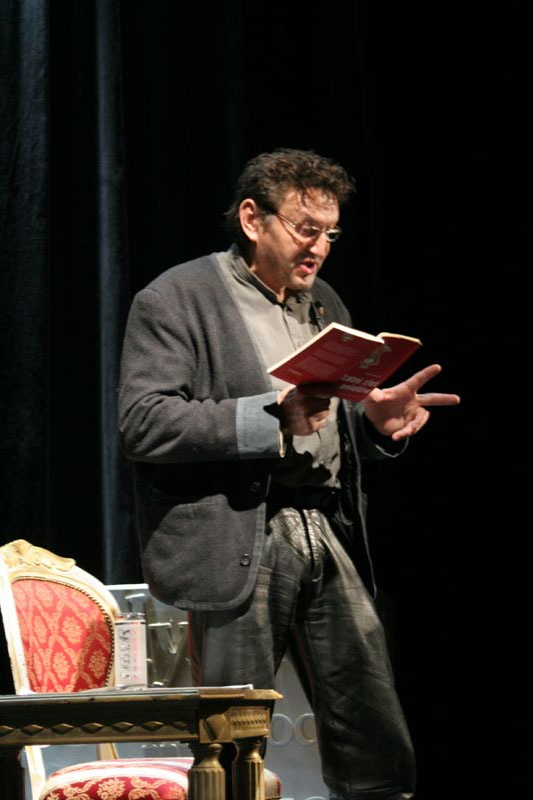
Interpretations by Krzysztof Majchrzak
