= Agata Bielik-Robson =

Polish philosopher

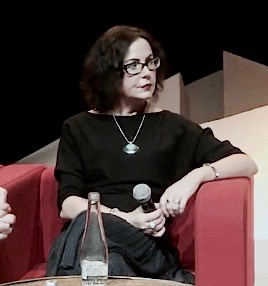
- Bielik-Robson in 2019 in conversation at Scena MO
- Born: June 6, 1966 (age 60)
- Known for: Jewish Marranos, Messianism, History
- Scientific career
- Fields: Jewish Studies
- Workplaces: University of Nottingham

Agata Bielik-Robson (born 6 June 1966) is a Polish philosopher. She is interested in Jewish thought, literary theory, and the philosophy of the subject.

== Biography ==
Bielik-Robson graduated from the University of Warsaw in 1989; she received her PhD in philosophy in 1995, also from University of Warsaw. Since 2011, she has been professor of Jewish Studies at the University of Nottingham. She is also extraordinary professor at the Institute for Philosophy and Sociology of the Polish Academy of Sciences (Instytut Filozofii i Socjologii Polskiej Akademii Nauk).

Since 2014, she has been member of the Jury for the Polish literary prize Gdynia. In her 2019 book, Another Finitude: Messianic Vitalism and Philosophy, Bielik-Robson wrote that Leonard Lawlor's "life-ism is a view that allows a 'completion of immanence' in the Deluzian sense".

Her doctoral students included Mikołaj Ratajczak.

== Bibliography ==
=== Authored books ===
==== Polish ====
- 1997: Na drugim brzegu nihilizmu[ Nihilism's Other Shore].
- 2000: Inna nowoczesność Different Modernity.
- 2004: Duch powierzchni: rewizja romantyczna i filozofia [The Spirit of the Surface: Romantic Revision and Philosophy].
- 2008: Romantyzm, niedokończony projekt. Eseje [The Unfinished Project of Romanticism. An Essay].
- 2008: Na pustyni. Kryptoteologie późnej nowoczesności [In the Desert. Late Modern Cryptotheologies].
- 2010: Agamben: przewodnik Krytyki Politycznej [Agamben: A Guide to Political Critique].
- 2012: Bielik-Robson: żyj i pozwól żyć [Bielik-Robson: live and let live], with Michał Sutowski.
- 2012: Erros. Mesjański witalizm i filozofia [Erros. Messianic Vitalism and Philosophy].
- 2016: Cienie pod czerwona̜ skała̜ eseje o literaturze [Shadows under a Red Rock. Essays on literature].
- 2022: Maranska Pascha Derridy. Zdrada, Wygnanie, Przeżycie, Nietozsamość. Derrida's Marrano Passover. Betrayal, Exile, Survival, Non-identity].

==== English ====
- 2011: The Saving Lie: Harold Bloom and Deconstruction. Evanston, IL: Northwestern University Press.
- 2014: Philosophical Marranos. Jewish Cryptotheologies of Late Modernity. London and New York: Routledge.
- 2019: Another Finitude: Messianic Vitalism and Philosophy. London: Bloomsbury Publishing.
- 2023: Derrida's Marrano Passover: Exile, Survival, Betrayal, and the Metaphysics of Non-Identity. London: Bloomsbury Publishing.

=== Translations ===
- 2016: Cezary Wodziński: Heidegger and the Problem of Evil, trans. with Patrick Trompiz. Berne: Peter Lang.

=== Collected volumes ===
- 2017: Agata-Bielik Robson (editor): Judaism in contemporary thought: traces and influence. London and New York: Routledge.
- 2020: Agata Bielik-Robson and Daniel Whistler (editors): Interrogating Modernity: Debates with Hans Blumenberg. Cham, Switzerland: Palgrave Macmillan.
- 2021: Agata Bielik-Robson and Daniel H. Weiss (editors): Tsimtsum and modernity lurianic heritage in modern philosophy and theology. Berlin: De Gruyter.
- 2022: Agata Bielik-Robson (editors): The Marrano Way: Between Betrayal and Innovation. Berlin: De Gruyter.
