= Dariusz Brzeziński =

Polish sociologist (born 1981)

- Born: 1981 (age 44–45)
- Education: Jagiellonian University
- Occupation: Sociologist

Dariusz Brzeziński (born 1981) is a sociologist specializing in social theory, culture theory, sociology and cultural anthropology, academic teacher, professor and head of the Department of Theoretical Sociology at the Institute of Philosophy and Sociology of the Polish Academy of Sciences.

== Biography ==
In 2006, he graduated with a master's degree in sociology from the Jagiellonian University. In 2007, he graduated with a master's degree in European Studies from the University of Exeter. In 2008, he graduated with MA in Cultural Studies from the Jagiellonian University.

In 2014, he obtained his PhD from the Institute of Sociology of the Jagiellonian University, based on his thesis Myślenie utopijne w teorii społecznej Zygmunta Baumana (Utopian Thinking in Zygmunt Bauman's Social Theory), written under the supervision of Maria Flis. In 2024, he obtained his habilitation from the Institute of Philosophy and Sociology of the Polish Academy of Sciences, based on his thesis Socjologia Zygmunta Baumana w kontekście orientacji teoretycznych oraz przemian społecznych i kulturowych XX i XXI wieku (Zygmunt Bauman's Sociology in the Context of Theoretical Orientations and Social and Cultural Changes of the 20th and 21st Centuries). He was employed as an academic teacher at the Department of Literary Anthropology and Cultural Studies at the Jagiellonian University and at the Inter-Faculty Individual Studies in the Humanities. In 2018, he became a Visiting Research Fellow at the School of Sociology and Social Policy at the University of Leeds.

He became a member of the Commission on Civilization Threats of the Polish Academy of Arts and Sciences, the International Media and Nostalgia Network (2021), the Polish Sociological Association (2022) and the British Sociological Association (2024).

== Books ==
=== Monographs ===
- Brzeziński, Dariusz (2015). Myślenie utopijne w teorii społecznej Zygmunta Baumana. Warszawa: Wydawnictwo Naukowe Scholar.
- Brzeziński, Dariusz (2017). Twórczość Zygmunta Baumana w kontekście współczesnych teorii kultury. Warszawa: Instytut Filozofii i Socjologii Polskiej Akademii Nauk.
- Brzeziński, Dariusz (2022). Zygmunt Bauman and the Theory of Culture. Montreal: McGill-Queen’s University Press.

=== Editions ===
- Bauman, Zygmunt (2017). Szkice z teorii kultury. Dariusz Brzeziński (edited by). Wydawnictwo Naukowe Scholar. In English: Sketches in the Theory of Culture. Cambridge: Polity Press. 2018. In Portuguese: Esboços de uma teoria da cultura. Rio de Janeiro: Zahar. 2022. In Spanish: Esbozos sobre la teoría de la cultura. Barcelona: Ediciones Paidós. 2024.
- Zygmunt Bauman, Selected Writings. M. Davis, D. Brzeziński, J. Pamer, T. Campbell (edited by). Cambridge: Polity Press. 2021–2024. Three volumes.
- Revisiting Modernity and the Holocaust: Heritage, Dilemmas, Extensions. J. Palmer, D. Brzeziński (edited by). London: Routledge. 2022.
- Bronisław Malinowski and His Legacy in Contemporary Social Sciences and Humanities. On the centenary of the publication of 'Argonauts of the Western Pacific'. G. Kubica, D. Brzeziński (edited by). London: Routledge. 2024.
- Algorithms, Artificial Intelligence and Beyond: Theorising Society and Culture of the 21st Century. D. Brzeziński, K. Filipek, K. Piwowar, M. Winiarska-Brodowska (edited by). London: Routledge. 2025.
