= Wodziński =

Wodziński (feminine: Wodzińska; plural: Wodzińscy) is a Polish surname. Notable people with the surname include:

- Cezary Wodziński (1959–2016), Polish philosopher
- Marcin Wodziński (born 1966), Polish historian
- Maria Wodzińska (1819–1896), Polish artist
