= Mikołaj Ratajczak =

Philosopher specializing in the thought of Karl Marx (born 1986)

- Born: 1986 (age 39–40)
- Occupation: Philosopher

Academic background
- Education: Adam Mickiewicz University in Poznań
- Doctoral advisor: Agata Bielik-Robson

Mikołaj Ratajczak (born 1986) is a philosopher, scholar and translator of Karl Marx's thought at the Institute of Philosophy and Sociology of the Polish Academy of Sciences.

== Biography ==
In 2010 he graduated in philosophy from Adam Mickiewicz University in Poznań. In 2016 he obtained doctorate from the Institute of Philosophy and Sociology of the Polish Academy of Sciences upon dissertation Życie, praca, język. Kategorie współczesnej włoskiej filozofii politycznej supervised by Agata Bielik-Robson.

He was co-founder and contributor to the journal Praktyka Teoretyczna. From 2012 to 2015, he was the editor of the philosophy and social sciences section at the Polish Scientific Publishers PWN. He published in Znak. His research interests include the history of philosophy and the history of political and scientific ideas, particularly those of the 20th century. His monograph, Forma życia i dobro wspólne, is about the history of the development of contemporary radical political philosophy in Italy.

== Books ==
- Forma życia i dobro wspólne. Warszawa. 2020.
