= Tadeusz M. Jaroszewski =

Polish Marxist philosopher

Tadeusz Maciej Jaroszewski (1930–1988) was a Polish Marxist philosopher and religious studies professor of humanities, in the years 1976–1981 director of the Institute of Philosophy and Sociology PAN

== Publications ==
- Filozofia marksistowska. Podręcznik akademicki, Warszawa: Państ. Wydaw. Naukowe, 1975.
- Filozofia społeczna i doktryna polityczna Kościoła Katolickiego, Warszawa: Wyższa Szkoła Nauk Społecznych przy KC PZPR, 1965.
- Filozoficzne problemy współczesnego chrześcijaństwa, Warszawa: Państwowe Wydawnictwo Naukowe, 1973.
- Humanizm socjalistyczny (red.), Warszawa: "Książka i Wiedza", 1980.
- Kierunki walki o laicyzację życia społecznego w Polsce (tezy referatu), Warszawa: Zarząd Główny Towarzystwa Szkoły Świeckiej, 1961.
- Kościół a świat współczesny. Uwagi o soborowej konstytucji "Gaudium et spes", Warszawa: Centralny Ośrodek Doskonalenia Kadr Laickich, 1967.
- Laicyzacja, Warszawa: "Iskry", 1966.
- Leninizm a problemy współczesnej filozofii, Warszawa: Polska Akademia Nauk, 1970.
- Marksiści i katolicy. Perspektywy dialogu, Warszawa: "Książka i Wiedza", 1988.
- Osobowość i własność. Ideał struktury ekonomicznej i społecznej w ujęciu personalizmu neotomistycznego, Warszawa: "Książka i Wiedza", 1965.
- Osobowość i wspólnota. Problemy osobowości we współczesnej antropologii filozoficznej, Warszawa: "Książka i Wiedza", 1970.
- Podstawy marksistowskiego światopoglądu : materiał pomocniczy dla Zespołów Kształcenia Ideologicznego, Warszawa: Książka i Wiedza, 1987.
- Problemy upowszechniania marksistowskiego poglądu na świat. Referat wygłoszony na VIII Plenum ZG TKKŚ, Kraków: Towarzystwo Krzewienia Kultury Świeckiej, 1977.
- Problemy upowszechnienia marksistowskiego poglądu na świat, Warszawa: Młodzieżowa Agencja Wydawnicza, 1977.
- Pytania i odpowiedzi : ideologia, polityka, gospodarka, handel zagraniczny, rolnictwo, sprawy międzynarodowe, [Warszawa]: "Książka i Wiedza", 1969.
- Renesans scholastyki, jego źródła społeczne i intelektualne, Warszawa: "Książka i Wiedza", 1961.
- Rozważania o praktyce : wokół interpretacji filozofii Karola Marksa, Warszawa: Państowe Wydawnictwo Naukowe, 1974.
- Słownik filozofii marksistowskiej, Warszawa: "Wiedza Powszechna", 1982.
- Społeczno-ideologiczne aspekty rewolucji naukowo-technicznej, Gdańsk: Wojewódzki Ośrodek Propagandy Partyjnej przy KW PZPR, 1971.
- Strukturalizm a marksizm, Warszawa: "Książka i Wiedza", 1969.
- Tradycje i współczesność klerykalizmu politycznego, Warszawa: TKKŚ, 1986.
- Traktat o naturze ludzkiej, Warszawa: "Książka i Wiedza", 1980.
- Der "verlassene" Mensch Jean Paul Sartres, Berlin: Akad.- Verl., 1975.
- Die wachsende Rolle der Arbeiterklasse in den sozialistischen Ländern, Berlin: Dietz, 1974.
- Wokół encykliki Populorum progressio, Warszawa: Centralny Ośrodek Doskonalenia Kadr Laickich, 1968.
- Wybrane problemy filozofii marksistowskiej. Zbiór opracowań, Warszawa: "Książka i Wiedza", 1972, 1973.
- Wybrane zagadnienia dialektyki marksistowskiej, Warszawa: Wyższa Szkoła Nauk Społecznych przy KC PZPR, 1960.
- Wybrane zagadnienia dialektyki marksistowskiej. Skrypt wykładu, Warszawa: Wyższa Szkoła Nauk Społecznych przy KC PZPR, 1961
