= Adam Wiedemann =

Polish poet, writer, translator, and literary critic (born 1967)

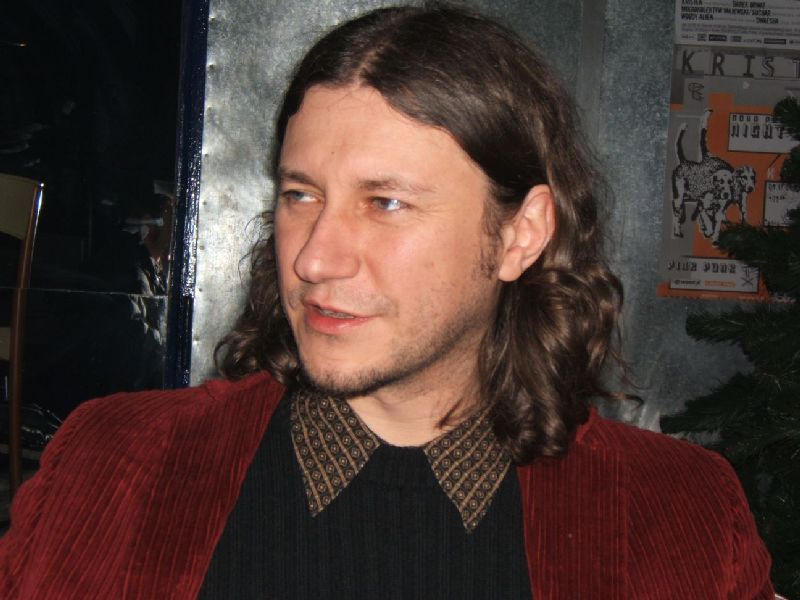
- Adam Wiedemann, 2005
- Born: 24 December 1967 (age 58); Krotoszyn
- Occupations: Poet, writer, translator, literary critic

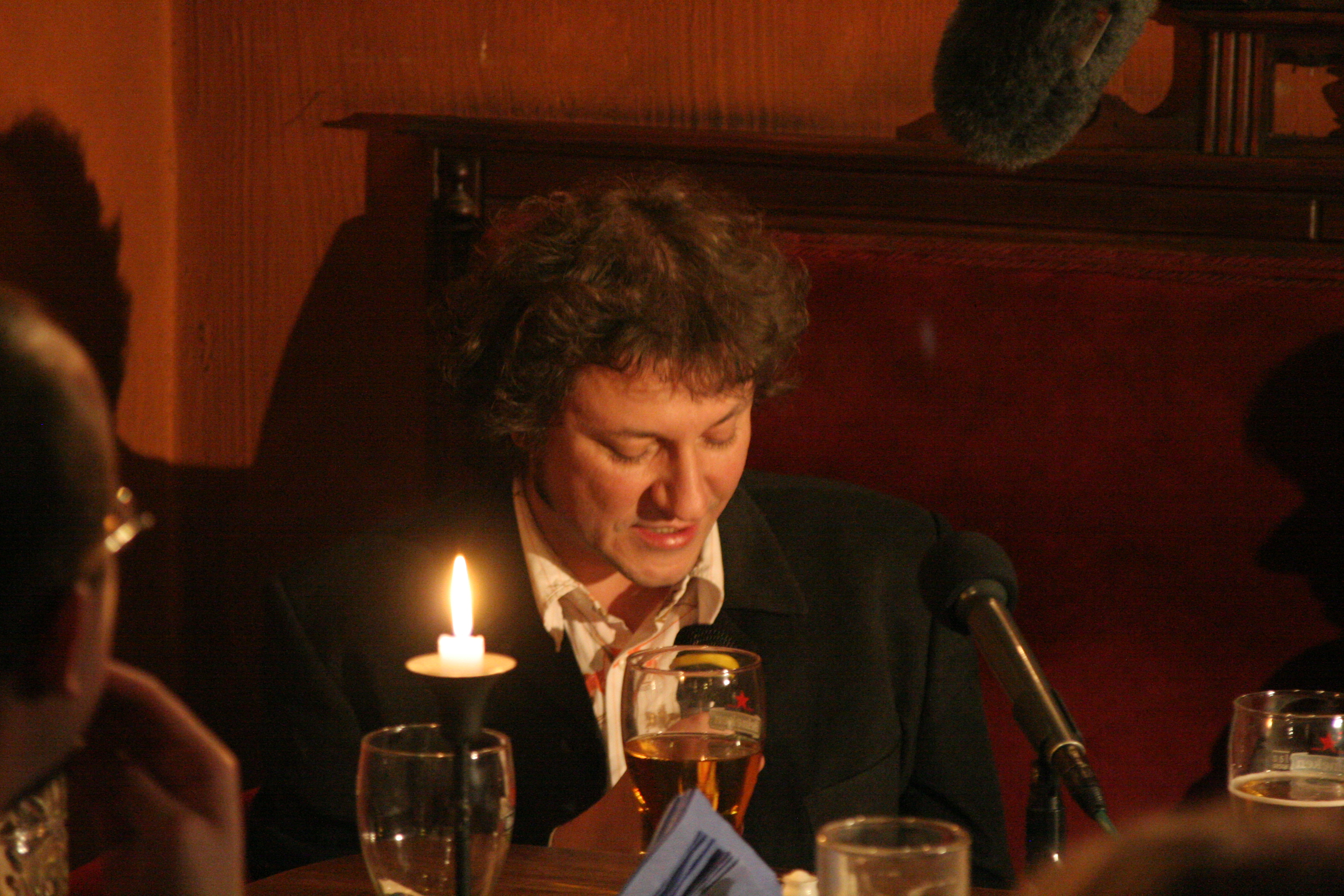
Adam Wiedemann

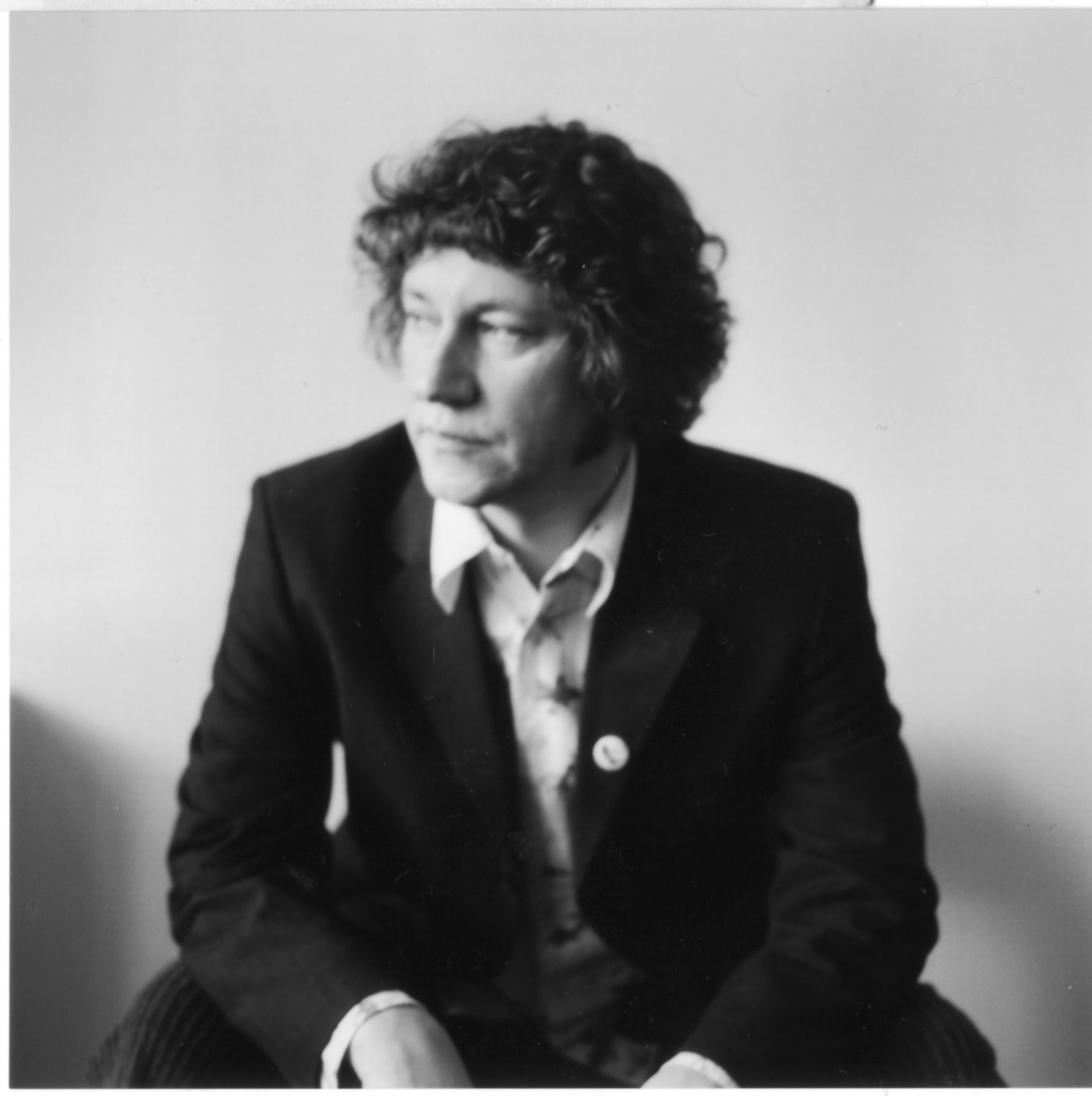
Adam Wiedemann

Adam Wiedemann (born 24 December 1967) is a poet, writer, translator, literary and music critic.

== Biography ==
Son of Jerzy Wiedemann and Janina née Kubiak. He attended the Maria Skłodowska-Curie High School in Ostrzeszów. After passing his matura in 1986, he studied Polish studies at the Jagiellonian University in Kraków; he obtained his master's degree in 1991.

Between 1996 and 2005 he published the reviews of music albums in Tygodnik Powszechny. He translated poetry from Ukrainian, Slovenian and English. He also painted, drew, and illustrated books. His poems were translated into English, German, Slovenian and Ukrainian.

== Poetry books ==
- Samczyk. Poznań: Obserwator. 1996.
- Bajki zwierzęce. Wrocław: Wydawnictwo Pomona. 1997.
- Rozrusznik. Kraków: Wydawnictwo Literackie. 1998.
- Ciasteczka z kremem. Legnica: Biuro Literackie. 1998.
- Konwalia. Legnica: Biuro Literackie. 2001.
- Kalipso. Warszawa: Prószyński i S-ka. 2004.
- Pensum. Wojewódzka Biblioteka Publiczna i Centrum Animacji Kultury w Poznaniu. 2007.
- Filtry. Warszawa: Staromiejski Dom Kultury. 2008.
- Czyste czyny. Wojewódzka Biblioteka Publiczna i Centrum Animacji Kultury w Poznaniu. 2009.
- Dywan. Wojewódzka Biblioteka Publiczna i Centrum Animacji Kultury w Poznaniu. 2010.
- Domy schadzek. Maciej Topolski (prepared by). Wojewódzka Biblioteka Publiczna i Centrum Animacji Kultury w Poznaniu. 2012.
- Z ruchem. Wojewódzka Biblioteka Publiczna i Centrum Animacji Kultury w Poznaniu. 2014.
- Metro na Żerań. Wojewódzka Biblioteka Publiczna i Centrum Animacji Kultury w Poznaniu. 2016.
- Odżywki i suplementy. Państwowy Instytut Wydawniczy. 2022. ISBN 978-83-8196-363-3.

== Short stories collections ==
- Wszędobylstwo porządku. Kraków: Studium/Zielona Sowa. 1997.
- Sęk pies brew. Warszawa: W.A.B. 1998.
- Sceny łóżkowe. Kraków: Korporacja Ha!art. 2005.
- Odpowiadania. Wrocław: Biblioteka Rity Baum. 2011.

== Other books ==
- Końcówki. Henryk Bereza mówi. Piotr Czerniawski (co-author). Kraków: Korporacja Ha!art. 2010.

== Accolades ==
In 1999 he received Kościelski Award. In 2005 he earned Nike Award nomination for the poetry volume Kalipso. In 2008 he received Gdynia Literary Prize for the book Pensum. Also in 2008 he was nominated to Silesius Poetry Award for Filtry. In 2011 he was nominated to Gdynia Literary Prize for the book Dywan. In 2015 he was nominated to Silesius Poetry Award for the book Z ruchem. In 2023 he was nominated to Gdynia Literary Prize for Odżywki i suplementy.

== Bibliography ==
- …widoki są niejadalne… O twórczości Adama Wiedemanna. Dawid Skarbek (edited by). Warszawa: Semper. 2007.
