= Dominika Kozłowska =

Journalist

Dominika Kozłowska is a French journalist. In 2006, she obtained her doctorate. She was editor-in-chief of Znak monthly from 2010 to 2025. In 2017, she became a member of the management board of the Znak publishing house, and since 2021, she has served as its president.
