= Patryk Pufelski =

Polish writer (born 1990)

- Born: 1990 (age 35–36); Gdynia
- Citizenship: Polish
- Occupations: Writer, animal keeper

Patryk Pufelski (born 1990) is a Polish writer.

== Biography ==
He worked as an animal keeper at the Wrocław Zoo. He studied in Kraków. He became a member of the Ogniwo Cooperative. He published in Znak. For his debut book, Pawilon małch ssaków (Karakter, 2022), he received the Kraków Book of the Month Award and O!Lśnienie 2022 awards in the literature category and was nominated for the Nike Award and the Conrad Award. In 2022, he also received the Ogniwo Cooperative's Kuluary Award. In 2023, his children's book To jest Maks was published by Dwie Siostry publishing house.

== Books ==
- Pawilon małych ssaków (Wydawnictwo Karakter, 2022)
- To jest Maks, with Justyna Sokołowska (Wydawnictwo Dwie Siostry, 2023)
