= Znak (monthly) =

Znak is a monthly issued in Kraków by Znak.

== History ==
The monthly "Znak" was founded on the initiative of a group of people associated with Tygodnik Powszechny. The first issue appeared in June 1946. The monthly maintained formal independence from the Church, although its inception was supported by Adam Stefan Sapieha. Editors-in-chief of Znak included Hanna Malewska and Stanisław Stomma. Dominika Kozłowska was editor-in-chief from 2010 to 2025; then Mateusz Burzyk replaced her in the position. Contributors to Znak included Wojciech Bonowicz, Jan Kracik,, Piotr Oczko, Patryk Pufelski, Mikołaj Ratajczak and Maciej Stroiński.

== Bibliography ==
- Bardel M., ed. (2006). Ku jedności świata. Wybór artykułów z miesięcznika „Znak” w 60. rocznicę powstania pisma. Kraków: Społeczny Instytut Wydawniczy Znak. ISBN 978-83-240-0702-8.
- Pisma kulturalne w Polsce po 1989. Leksykon. Katowice. 2010. p. 347.
