= Institute of Philosophy and Sociology of the Polish Academy of Sciences =

Polish research institute

- Instytut Filozofii i Socjologii Polskiej Akademii Nauk
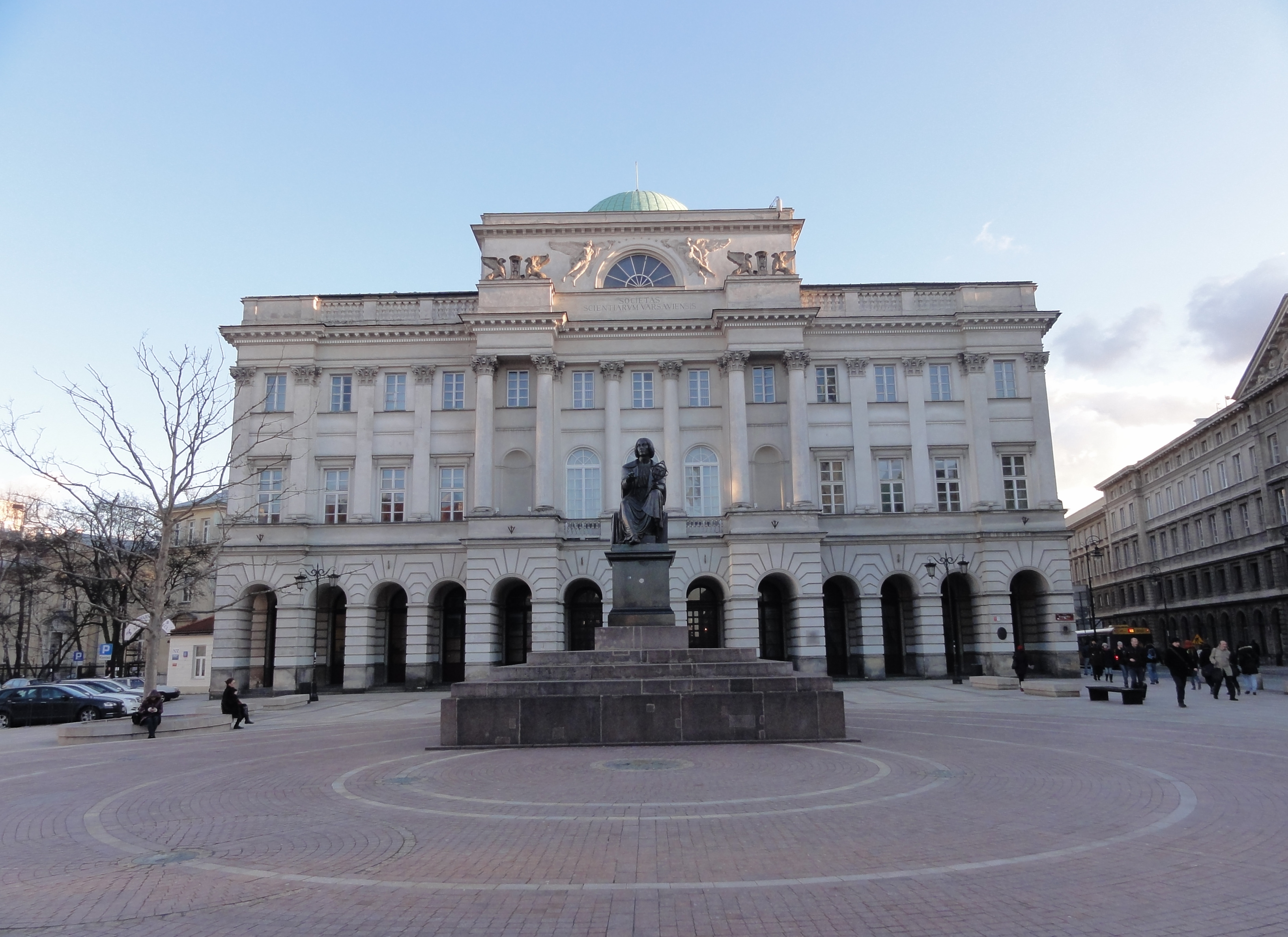
- Seat of the institute (the Staszic Palace)
- Abbreviation: IFiS PAN
- Type: Scientific
- Established: 1956
- Rector: Andrzej Rychard
- Location: ul. Nowy Świat 72; 00-330 Warszawa, Warsaw, Poland
- Website: ifispan.pl

Institute of Philosophy and Sociology of the Polish Academy of Sciences (Polish: Instytut Filozofii i Socjologii Polskiej Akademii Nauk, IFiS PAN) is a scientific Institute of the Polish Academy of Sciences, based in the Palace of Technology in Warsaw. Its primary aim is to conduct "advanced" studies in philosophy and sociology and science of cognition and communication. In addition to the scientific Institute conducts educational activities, publishing and popularizing.

== Directors of Institute ==
- Adam Schaff (1956–1968)
- Jan Szczepański (1968–1975)
- Tadeusz M. Jaroszewski (1976–1981)
- Kazimierz Doktór (1981–1987)
- Piotr Płoszajski (1988–1991)
- Andrzej Rychard (1991–2000)
- Henryk Domański (2000–2010)
- Andrzej Rychard (2011–present)

== Academic staff ==
- Mikołaj Ratajczak
