= Marian Pankowski =

Polish writer, poet, literary critic and translator

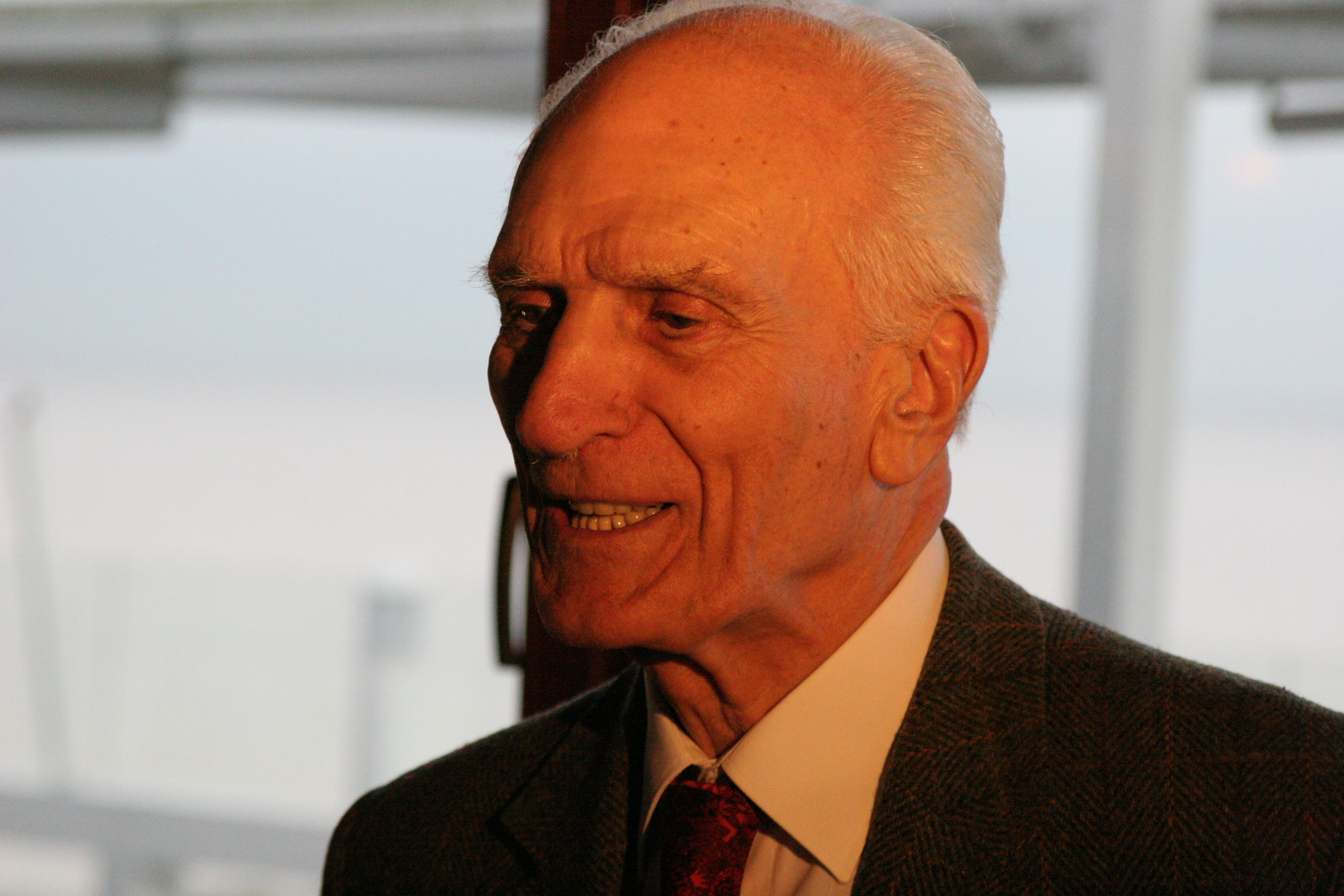
Pankowski in 2008

Marian Pankowski (9 November 1919 – 3 April 2011) was a Polish writer, poet, literary critic and translator.

Pankowski was born in Sanok. He was a member of the Polish resistance during World War II, and a prisoner in the Nazi concentration camp Bergen-Belsen. After the war, he settled in Belgium, where he died in Brussels from pneumonia on 3 April 2011 at the age of 91.

== Writing ==
Pankowski's Holocaust narratives critically engage with the Polish tradition; he frequently criticizes the pronounced patriarchalism cum Catholicism. The controversy that resulted from his writing seems to stem from his "unconventional approach to sexuality, including same-sex love."

Besides writing original work, Pankowski has published translations of Polish poetry into French.
