= Norwid =

Norwid is a Polish last name. Notable people with this last name include:

- Cyprian Norwid (1821–1883), Polish poet, dramatist, painter, and sculptor
- Mieczysław Norwid-Neugebauer (1884–1954), Polish general

== See also ==
- Cyprian Norwid Theatre
