= Fund for National Culture (Poland) =

Polish state foundation

The Fund for National Culture (Polish: Fundusz Kultury Narodowej, FKN) was a Polish state foundation with headquarters in Warsaw, operating in the Second Polish Republic, between 1928–1939 and later during the war with the support of the Polish government in exile.

The Fund was subordinated to the Ministry of the Interior, and later, to the Ministry of Religious Affairs and Public Education.

== History ==
The Fund for National Culture was established in 1928. It was subsidized by the state and supported by contributions from private individuals and institutions.

The Fund's task was to support Polish scientific and artistic enterprises through: allowances and scholarships for individual persons, subsidies for publishing houses and subsidies for scientific and artistic institutions and teams. Among the beneficiaries, that obtained subsidies for the implementation of specific scientific and research projects, was the Polish Academy of Learning.

The Fund for National Culture was headed by a Committee chaired by the Prime Minister of Poland. However, the fund was self-governing and had some independence from political institutions. Scholars and artists sat on the Fund's council and committees. Stanisław Michalski was the director of the Fund for National Culture throughout all its activity.

Pursuant to the Act of 16 July 1937, the Fund for National Culture took the patronage of Józef Piłsudski, adopting the name of the Józef Piłsudski Fund for National Culture.

Following the German invasion of Poland, in October 1939 the Fund was reactivated by the Polish government in exile. It would play a significant role in supporting Polish educational, cultural and research initiatives during the war period in the Allied-controlled territories.

== Bibliography ==
- "Fundusz Kultury Narodowej (1928–1937): zarys działalności". 32815 II (in Polish). Warszawa: Wydawnictwo Funduszu Kultury Narodowej. 1937.
