= Cezary Wodziński =

Polish philosopher

Cezary Wodziński (27 May 1959 – 12 June 2016) was a Polish philosopher, historian of philosophy, essayist, translator, and writer. He was a lecturer at Jagiellonian University in Cracow (Poland) and at the University of Warsaw (Poland).

== Biography ==
=== Life ===
Cezary Wodziński, the son of Zygmunt Wodziński (an engineer) and Michalina Wodzińska (teacher), was born in rural Lębork, Poland. He attended Tadeusz Reytan's High School in Warsaw. Among his classmates were Filip Łobodziński, journalist and translator, and Andrzej Sosnowski, poet. Following high school graduation, he took a job at Psychoneurological Institute of Warsaw as a paramedic. Aside from this, he also enrolled to Mountain Rescue, GOPR (Grupa Beskidzka - Bieszczady).

In 1979, he started studying philosophy at the University of Warsaw. During his studies, he was the author of many philosophical publications. He defended his dissertation in 1985 with a thesis: "The dispute about the limits of rationality. Szestow – Husserl”, which was a degree of honors. In 1986, he worked first at the Institute of Philosophy and Sociology of PAN (National Academy of Sciences) in the Department of Contemporary Philosophy, headed by prof. Barbara Skarga, followed by prof. Stanisław Borzym. In 1996, he started an independent research lab. In 1989, he defended his doctorate. PhD thesis was "Knowledge and salvation. Study of Lev Shestov's thoughts. Supervisor of his PhD thesis was prof. B. Skarga, and reviewers: Professor. R. Łużny, prof. K. Pomian. He habilitated in 1994. Habilitation thesis was "Heidegger and the problem of evil". Among reviewers were prof. K. Michalski, prof. B. Skarga and prof. J. Tischner. The habilitation was awarded with T. Kotarbinski prize and Prime Minister prize. In 1999 he eventually obtained the title of professor of the humanities. In the end of 90s' he was an editor in chief of philosophical magazines as following: „Aletheia” i „Biblioteki Aletheia”. As a result of his outstanding performance, he was awarded an academic scholarships i.a. in Paris, Vienna and Fryburg. Wodziński lectured in Stockholm and Moscow. In 2001 he obtained the title of professor ordinarius at Jagiellonian University of Cracow.

=== Work ===
Ancient Greek philosophy, German philosophy, Russian philosophy and theology, religious philosophy, phenomenology, hermeneutics, philosophy of dialogue, transcendental philosophy, philosophy of language, philosophy of existence, metaphysics, ontology, axiology, all were topics of his particular interest. His achievements include: fifteen books, more than eighty essays and numerous lectures. He was awarded the 1st prize of STP (Stowarzyszenie Tłumaczy Polskich - Polish Translators Association) two times in the field of philosophical translation. He was a member of Collegium Invisibile.

To the most significant publications belong:

- Wiedza i zbawienie. Studium myśli Lwa Szestowa, Warszawa 1991
- I cóż po filozofie... Eseje filozoficzne, Warszawa 1992
- Filozofia jako sztuka myślenia. Zachęta dla licealistów, Warszawa 1993
- Heidegger i problem zła, Warszawa 1994
- Hermes i Eros. Eseje drugie, Warszawa 1997
- Wielkie Wędrowanie, Warszawa 1998
- Światłocienie zła, Warszawa 1998
- Pan Sokrates. Eseje trzecie, Warszawa 2000
- Św. Idiota. Projekt antropologii apofatycznej, Gdańsk 2000
- Filozofia jako sztuka myślenia, Warszawa 2000 (2 wyd. rozszerzone)
- Swietijat idiot. Projekt za apofaticzna antropołogija, Sofija 2004
- Trans, Dostojewski, Rosja, czyli o filozofowaniu siekierą, Gdańsk 2005
- Nic po ironii. Eseje czwarte, Warszawa 2006
- Między anegdotą a doświadczeniem, Gdańsk 2007
- Heidegger i problem zła, Gdańsk 2007 (2 wyd.)
- Logo nieśmiertelności. Platona przypisy do Sokratesa, Gdańsk 2008
