= Polish Writers and Literary Scholars of the 20th and 21st centuries =

Online biographical dictionary

Polish Writers and Literary Scholars of the 20th and 21st centuries (Polish: Polscy pisarze i badacze literatury XX i XXI wieku) is an online biographical dictionary and research project that has been carried out by the Department of Contemporary Literature Documentation of the Institute of Literary Research of the Polish Academy of Sciences (IBL PAN) since 2018.

Polscy pisarze i badacze literatury XX i XXI wieku consists of around 2,300 entries on authors who began their literary work after 1918. It includes details of lives of poets, novelists, short stories writers, playwrights, literary critics, theatre critics, essayists, reportage writers, translators, literary historians, and literary theorists. The IBL PAN has labelled it a "biobibliographic dictionary" and stated that it is intended “for everyone seeking reliable knowledge”.

The dictionary is a continuation of the work of the Department of Contemporary Literature Documentation of IBL PAN, which resulted in the release of several series of dictionaries of literary biographies since 1950, including Współcześni polscy pisarze i badacze literatury (volumes 1–10, Warszawa, 1994–2007).

The IBL PAN has developed methodologies for creating biographical literaty studies with Jadwiga Czachowska, who was the director of the Department of Contemporary Literature Documentation between 1966 and 1993. Edited by Henryk Citko, Alicja Szałagan and Weronika Szulik, the dictionary's authors' team consists of a dozen literary scholars, ten historical authors, cyber consultant, translator and translation editor. As of 14 November 2024, 457 of the dictionary's entries have been translated into English. Contributors to the dictionary included Beata Dorosz and Ewa Głębicka.

== Writers and literary scholars included in the dictionary ==
Polish Writers and Literary Scholars of the 20th and 21st centuries consists of around 2,300 entries on authors who began their literary work after 1918, those include:

- Jadwiga Czachowska
- Stanisław Czycz
- Wiesław Dymny
- Bolesław Faron
- Michał Głowiński

- Maria Janion
- Czesław Kłak
- Roman Loth
- Ryszard Nycz
- Kazimierz Orłoś
- Piotr Sommer
- Stanisław Stabro
- Marian Stala
- Adam Wiedemann
- Witold Wirpsza
- Wiktor Woroszylski
- Marta Wyka
