= Markiewicz =

Markiewicz (Polish pronunciation: [marˈkjɛvit͡ʂ]) is a Polish surname. It is similar to Markowicz and a number of surnames in other languages.

Language	Masculine	Feminine
Polish	Markiewicz	Markiewiczówna (maiden name); Markiewiczówa (married name); z Markiewiczów (“née Markiewicz”)
Belarusian (Romanization)	Маркевіч (Markevich, Markievič, Markievich, Markievitch)	
Latvian	Markevičs, Markēvičs	Markeviča, Markēviča
Lithuanian	Markevičius	Markevičienė (married); Markevičiūtė (unmarried)
Russian (Romanization)	Маркевич (Markevich, Markevitch)	
Ukrainian (Romanization)	Маркевич (Markevych, Markevytch, Markevyč)	

== People ==
- Alfred John Markiewicz (1928–1997), bishop of the Diocese of Kalamazoo
- Constance Markiewicz (1868–1927), Irish politician
- Henryk Markiewicz (1922–2013), historian of literature
- Jacek Markiewicz (born 1976), Polish footballer
- Kazimierz Dunin-Markiewicz (1874–1932), Polish artist and writer
- Marta Markiewicz (born 1989), Polish singer
- Piotr Markiewicz (born 1973), Polish canoeist
- Ryszard Markiewicz, jurist and legal advisor
- Tadeusz Markiewicz (born 1936), Polish sculptor
- Władysław Markiewicz (1920–2017), Polish sociologist
- Władysława Markiewiczówna (1900–1982), Polish pianist and educator

== See also ==
- Surnames derived from the name Mark
