= Loth =

Loth may refer to:

== People ==
=== Given name ===
- Lot, Biblical figure
- King Lot, figure in Arthurian legend
- Loth Schout (1600–1655), Dutch brewer

=== Surname ===
- Agnete Loth (1921–1990), editor and translator of Old Icelandic texts
- Andreas Loth (born 1972), German ice hockey player
- Hannes Loth (born 1981), German politician (AfD)
- Ila Lóth (1900–1975), Hungarian film actress
- Jan Loth (1900–1933), Polish footballer
- Joe Loth (born 1967), American football coach
- Johann Carl Loth (1632–1698), German Baroque painter
- Joseph Loth (1847–1934), French linguist and historian
- Moritz Loth (1832–1913), Moravian-American businessman
- Roman Loth (1931–2019), literary historian, editor and bibliographer
- Stanisław Loth (born 1929), Polish cinematographer and film director
- Wilfried Loth (born 1948), German historian and political scientist

== Places ==
- Loth, Orkney, a place in Orkney, Scotland

== Units of measurement ==
- Loth (weight), an historical unit of weight in the Holy Roman Empire

== See also ==
- LOTH (disambiguation)
