= Jadwiga Czachowska =

Polish literary historian, bibliographer, and editor (1922–2013)

- Born: Jadwiga Przygodzka; 30 October 1922; Lwów, Lwów Voivodeship, Second Polish Republic
- Died: 10 February 2013 (aged 90); Warsaw, Masovian Voivodeship, Third Polish Republic
- Resting place: Powązki Cemetery
- Occupations: Literary historian, bibliographer, editor
- Spouse: Adam Czachowski (m.1946)
- Children: 2
- Parents: Antoni Nowak-Przygodzki (father); Zofia Gumowska (mother)

Academic background
- Thesis: Gabriela Zapolska. Monografia biobibliograficzna (1963)
- Doctoral advisor: Ewa Korzeniewska

Jadwiga Czachowska (30 October 1922 – 10 February 2013) was a literary historian, bibliographer and editor.

== Biography ==
Daughter of Antoni Nowak-Przygodzki and the physician Zofia Gumowska. She attended the Queen Jadwiga Grammar and Secondary School No. XIII in Lwów. She was a member of the Polish Scouting Association.

During the Nazi occupation she remained in Lemberg and was a liaison at the National Military Organization. She was imprisoned by the Gestapo in 1944. In 1948 she graduated with a master's degree in Polish philology from the Jagiellonian University. From 1949 she was a researcher at Institute of Literary Research of the Polish Academy of Sciences (IBL PAN). She was the director of the Department of Contemporary Literature Documentation of the IBL PAN between 1966 and 1993. From 1991 she was a professor. From 1996 she was a member of Warsaw Scientific Society. In 1986 she supervised doctoral dissertation of Ewa Głębicka.

She wrote about Gabriela Zapolska.

== Books ==
- Gabriela Zapolska: monografia bio-bibliograficzna. Kraków: Wydawnictwo Literackie. 1966.
- Przewodnik polonisty. Bibliografie. Słowniki. Biblioteki. Muzea literackie. Wrocław. 1974. Co-authored with Roman Loth.
- Rozwój bibliografii literackiej w Polsce. Zakład Narodowy im. Ossolińskich. 1979.
- Literatura i krytyka poza cenzurą, 1977–1989: bibliografia druków zwartych. Wydawnictwo "Wiedza o Kulturze". 1991. Co-authored with Beata Dorosz.

== Bibliography ==
- Szałagan, Alicja (15 June 2015). "Cenzura PRL-owska we wspomnieniach profesor Jadwigi Czachowskiej". Sztuka Edycji. Studia Tekstologiczne i Edytorskie. 7 (1): 89–94. doi:10.12775/SE.2015.009. Archived from the original on 6 January 2026.
- Przypomniane. Profesor Jadwiga Czachowska w Instytucie Badań Literackich PAN. Z historii IBL PAN. Ewa Głębicka, Alicja Szałagan (eds.). Warszawa: Instytut Badań Literackich PAN. 2015. ISBN 9788364703508. Review of the book: "Jadwiga Czachowska – mól książkowy" (PDF). ptmts.ubb.edu.pl. 2020. Archived from the original (PDF) on 6 January 2026.
- Głębicka, Ewa (2015). "Jadwiga Czachowska (1922–2013)". Bibliotekarze polscy we wspomnieniach współczesnych. Organizatorzy, bibliografowie, dydaktycy. Warszawa: Biblioteka Narodowa. pp. 43–55.
