= Agnieszka Kłakówna =

Polish philologist and educational theorist (born 1950)

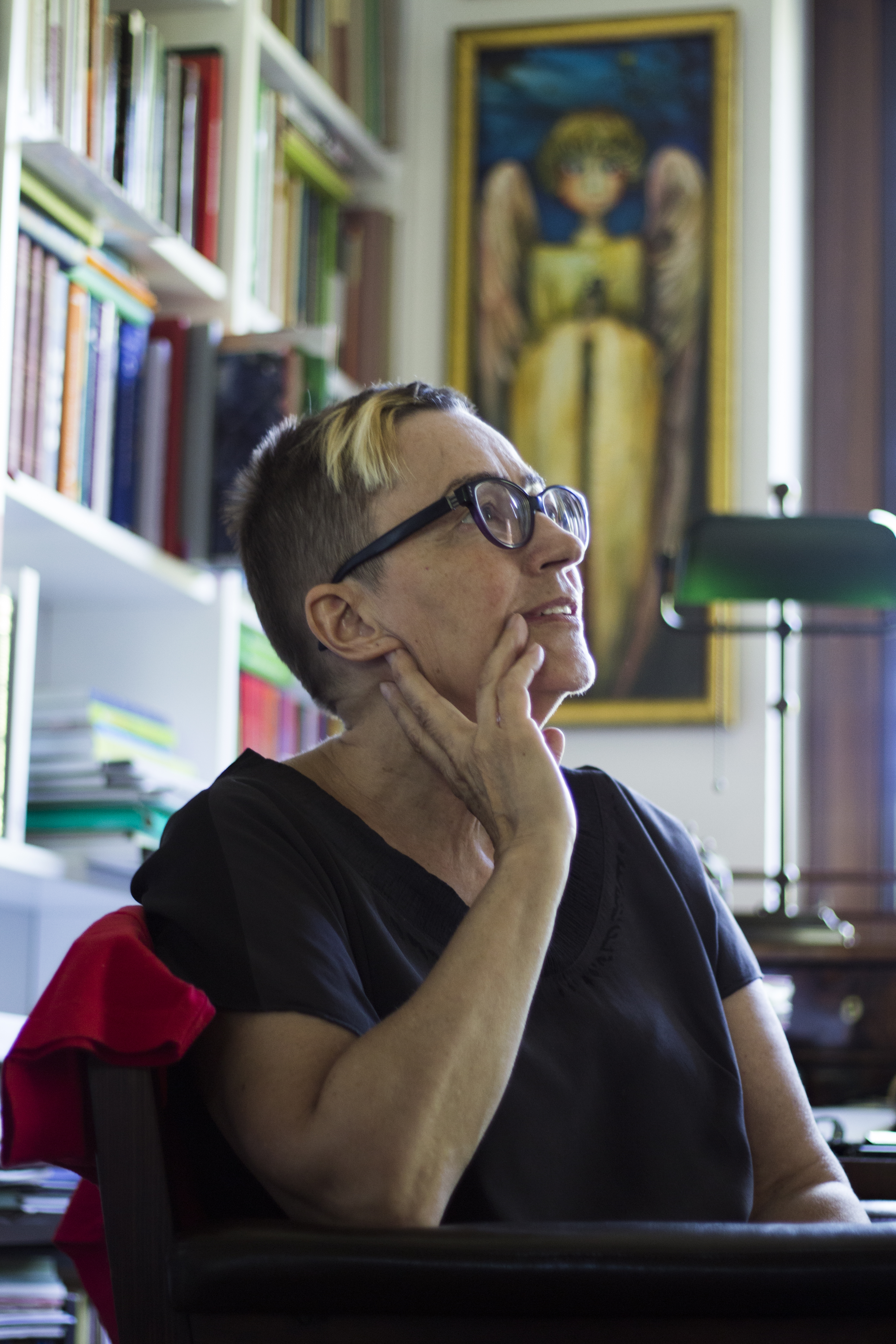
- Agnieszka Kłakówna, 2013
- Born: Zofia Julia Kłak; 15 May 1950 (age 76); Przemyśl
- Citizenship: Polish
- Education: Pedagogical Academy in Kraków
- Occupations: Philologist, educational theorist, schoolteacher

Agnieszka Kłakówna (Note: Born: Zofia Julia Kłak.) (born 15 May 1950) is a Polish philologist, educational theorist, academic, schoolteacher of Polish language with practice at all levels of school teaching and author of school textbooks.

A lecturer at the Pedagogical Academy in Kraków (1974–2005) and the Jan Długosz Academy in Częstochowa (2010–2017), a teacher of Polish language at the Martin Luther University of Halle-Wittenberg (1977–1980), she also worked as a teacher and director of the Polish School in Rabat, Morocco (1984–1986). She was the editor-in-chief of a methodical journal for Polish language teachers Wisełka, later renamed Ojczyzna Polszczyzna and Nowa Polszczyzna (1990–2008).

She was the initiator and co-author of works on a modern concept of school education in the field of Polish language; and authored several textbooks and programs, among them To lubię! textbook series, which began to arise in advance of officially announced school and curriculum reforms that followed with the 1989 political transformation in Poland (1993–2011). Kłakówna was referred to as „one of the most respected authors of textbooks for children and youth in Poland”.

== Life and work ==
A daughter of Izabela née Raszpla (1913–1967) and Kazimierz Kłak (1903–1968), the sister of Czesław Kłak, she graduated from the Wyższa Szkoła Pedagogiczna in Kraków (WSP), (Note: Since 2008 renamed the Pedagogical University of Cracow.) at which she studied Polish philology between 1969 and 1974, as well as for some time Russian philology.

In 1974, she was employed at the Department of Didactics of Polish Literature and Polish Language of the Institute of Polish Philology at WSP. Simultaneously she worked from 1974 to 1977 at the Primary School No. 33 in Kraków. In 1977–1980 she was a Polish language teacher at the Martin Luther University of Halle-Wittenberg.

In 1983 he obtained doctorate upon thesis Praktyka pisarska w procesie polonistycznej edukacji uczniów klas IV – VIII szkoły podstawowej supervised by Bolesław Faron. Then she worked at the Primary School No. 36 in Kraków (1983–1984) and at the Polish School at the Embassy of the People's Republic of Poland in Rabat, Morocco (1984–1986). In August 1986, during her return to Poland, she survived a sea disaster.

In 1986 she returned to work at her home university. At the same time, she started working at the Primary School No. 12 in Kraków (1987–1992) and at the Adam Mickiewicz High School in Kraków (1987–1991).

In 1990 she became the editor-in-chief of the methodical journal for Polish language teachers Wisełka, later renamed Ojczyzna-Polszczyzna and Nowa Polszczyzna. She held that position until 2008. In 1993, Kłakówna published a school textbook Sztuka pisania (The Art of Writing, co-authors Iwona Steczko and Krzysztof Wiatr). In 1993 with Bolesław Faron she co-founded Wydawnictwo Edukacyjne. In the years 1994–2011 she managed a team that developed a new program and school textbooks series To lubię! (That I like!) for the Polish language for grades fourth to eighth. The series was enthusiastically received by some teachers as innovative and diverging from previous pedagogical approaches. In 1999, after the educational reform in Poland, Kłakówna began the work on textbooks addressed to junior high school (gimnazjum), and then, from 2001, the work on textbooks addressed to high school.

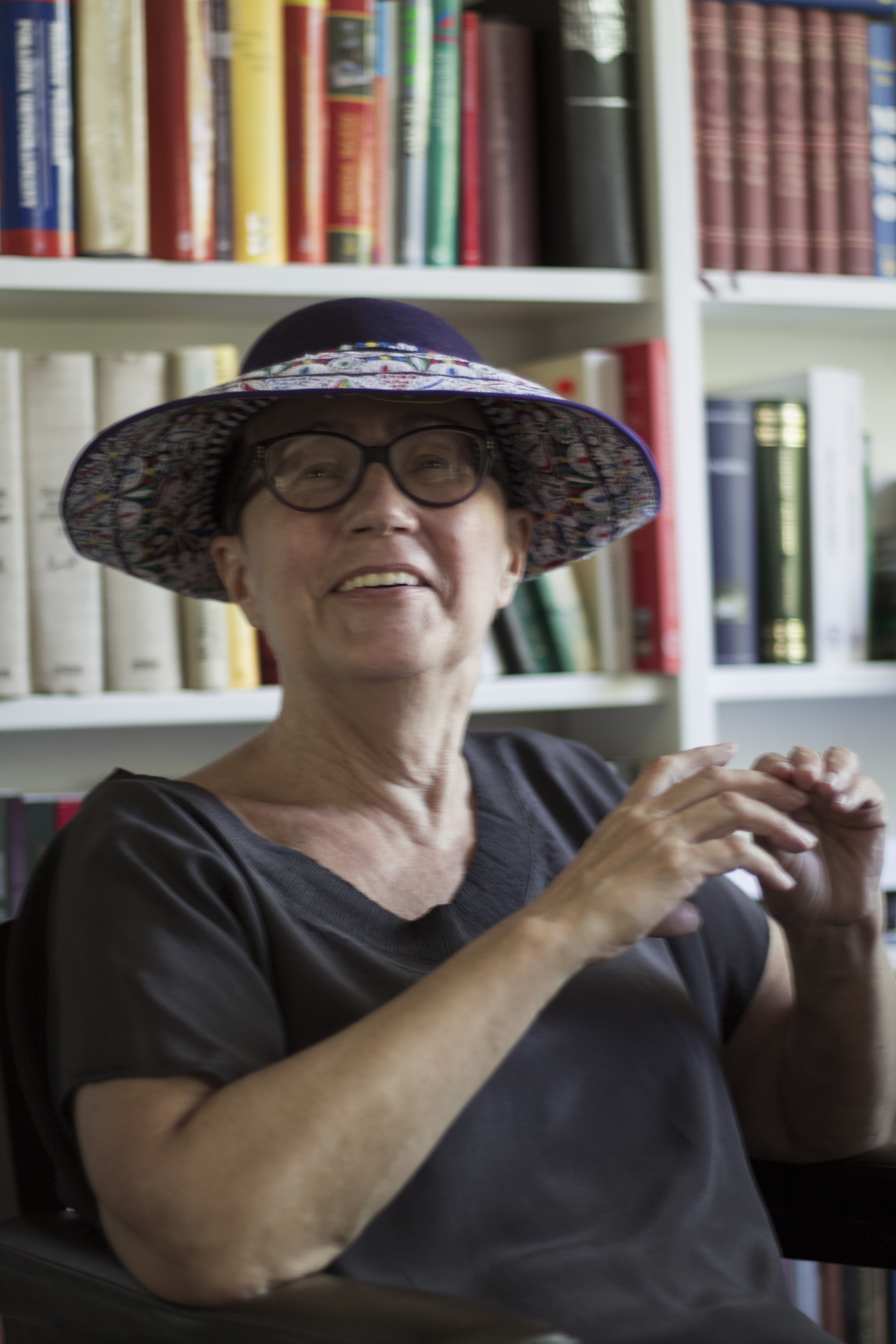
Agnieszka Kłakówna, 2013

In 2003, she received a postdoctoral degree in the humanities (habilitation) in the field of literary studies – literature didactics. In 2005 she completed her work at the Pedagogical Academy in Kraków. She spent the next five years working on creating Nowe To lubię! textbooks for high school and its amendment for grades fourth to sixth of primary school. In 2008, she was commissioned by the Ministry of National Education as a reviewer of the new curriculum proposal in the field of Polish language. In the years 2008–2011 she cooperated with the Gdańsk Institute for Market Economics. Three times (2009–2011) she spoke at the Civic Congress (Kongres Obywatelski) in Warsaw. In the years 2010–2017 she worked at the Jan Długosz Academy in Częstochowa as an associate professor.

In addition to the books that she published as an author, co-author or editor, Kłakówna has published almost sixty articles in the field of literature and didactics of the Polish language in professional magazines. She also published journalistic articles and commentaries, including in Polonistyka, Nowa Polszczyzna, Polityka, Przekrój, Gazeta Wyborcza and Tygodnik Powszechny.

She received multiple awards for her work.

== Books ==
- Literatura w szkole widziana inaczej. Wybór uczniowskich wypowiedzi pisemnych (opis metod postępowania dydaktycznego, wybór i opracowanie tekstów dziecięcych), with Jerzy Waligóra, 1980
- Sztuka pisania. Ćwiczenia redakcyjne dla klas IV–VI. Zeszyt ucznia (textbook), 1993
- Sztuka pisania. Ćwiczenia redakcyjne dla klas IV–VI szkoły podstawowej. Metodyczny podręcznik nauczyciela (teachers' manual)
- Moje Maroko, czyli skok do głębokiej wody, 1994
- To lubię! (a series of textbooks for primary, middle and high schools), 1994–2011
- Przymus i wolność. Projektowanie procesu kształcenia kulturowej kompetencji. Język polski w klasach IV–VI szkoły podstawowej, w gimnazjum i liceum, 2003
- Pakt dla szkoły. Zarys koncepcji kształcenia ogólnego. Zaproszenie do dyskusji (with Piotr Kołodziej and Janusz Waligóra), 2011
- Jakoś i jakość. Subiektywna kronika wypadków przy reformowaniu szkoły (1989–2013), 2014
- Edukacja w czasach cyfrowej zarazy (with Paweł Kasprzak, Piotr Kołodziej, Adam Regiewicz, Janusz Waligóra), 2016
- Język polski. Wykłady z metodyki (an academic handbook on thinking about the profession of a school teacher of Polish), 2016
- Bierz i czytaj, Wydawnictwo Edukacyjne, 2023
