= Ireneusz Opacki =

Literary historian (1933–2005)

- Born: 5 August 1933; Chortkiv
- Died: 9 July 2005 (aged 71); Katowice
- Citizenship: Polish
- Occupation: Literary historian

Academic background
- Education: Catholic University of Lublin
- Doctoral advisor: Kazimierz Wyka

Ireneusz Opacki (5 August 1933 – 9 July 2005) was a literary historian, professor at the University of Silesia.

== Biography ==
He was born in 1933 in Chortkiv; the son of Józef Opacki and Helena née Jurasek. He attended gymnasium and high school in Gliwice. He began his studies at the Silesian University of Technology, but interrupted them after a year. From 1953, he studied Polish studies at the Catholic University of Lublin (KUL), graduating in 1958. His master's thesis was supervised by Czesław Zgorzelski.

In 1966 he obtained his doctorate at the Jagiellonian University upon dissertation O przenikaniu się konwencji gatunkowych w poezji (On the Interpenetration of Genre Conventions in Poetry) supervised by Kazimierz Wyka. In 1972 he obtained habilitation at the Institute of Literary Research of the Polish Academy of Sciences. From 1981 to 1982 he was a vice-rector of the University of Silesia. From 1987 to 1990 he was the dean of the Faculty of Radio and Television at the University of Silesia.

He supervised more than thirty doctoral dissertations. His students included Leonard Neuger.

His remainings were buried at the Cemetery of the Parish of St. Barbara at Gen. Andersa Street in Sosnowiec.

== Works ==
- Ewolucje balladowej opowieści. Zagadnienie narratora i narracji w balladzie lat 1822–1920. 1961.
- Poezja romantycznych przełomów. Szkice. 1972.
- Ruch konwencji. Szkice o poezji romantycznej. 1975. Co-authored with Anna Opacka.
- Poetyckie dialogi z kontekstem. Szkice o poezji XX wieku. 1979.
- Lechoń i polskie mity. 1993.
- W środku niebokręga. Poezja romantycznych przełomów. 1995.
- Król-Duch, Herostrates i codzienność. Szkice. 1997.
- Odwrócona elegia. O przenikaniu się postaci gatunkowych w poezji. 1999.

== Accolades ==
- Medal of the Commission of National Education (1976)
- Knight's Cross of the Order of Polonia Restituta (1979)
- University of Silesia Pro Scientia et Arte Award (2004)

== Commemoration ==
In 2006, Institute of Polish Literature at the Faculty of Philology of the University of Silesia was named after him.
