= Margevičius =

- Lithuanian surname
- m.: Margevičius
- f.: (unmarried): Margevičiūtė
- f.: (married): Margevičienė

Margevičius (or Margevicius) is a surname. Notable people with the surname include:

- Deividas Margevičius (born 1995), Lithuanian swimmer
- Nick Margevicius (born 1996), American baseball player
- Vincė Vaidevutė Margevičienė (born 1949), Lithuanian biologist, political prisoner, politician, and a former Member of the Seimas

== See also ==
- Markevičius, a similar surname
