= Aniela Zagórska =

Polish translator (1881–1943)

Aniela Zagórska (26 December 1881, in Lublin – 30 November 1943, in Warsaw) was a Polish translator who rendered into Polish nearly all the works of Joseph Conrad.

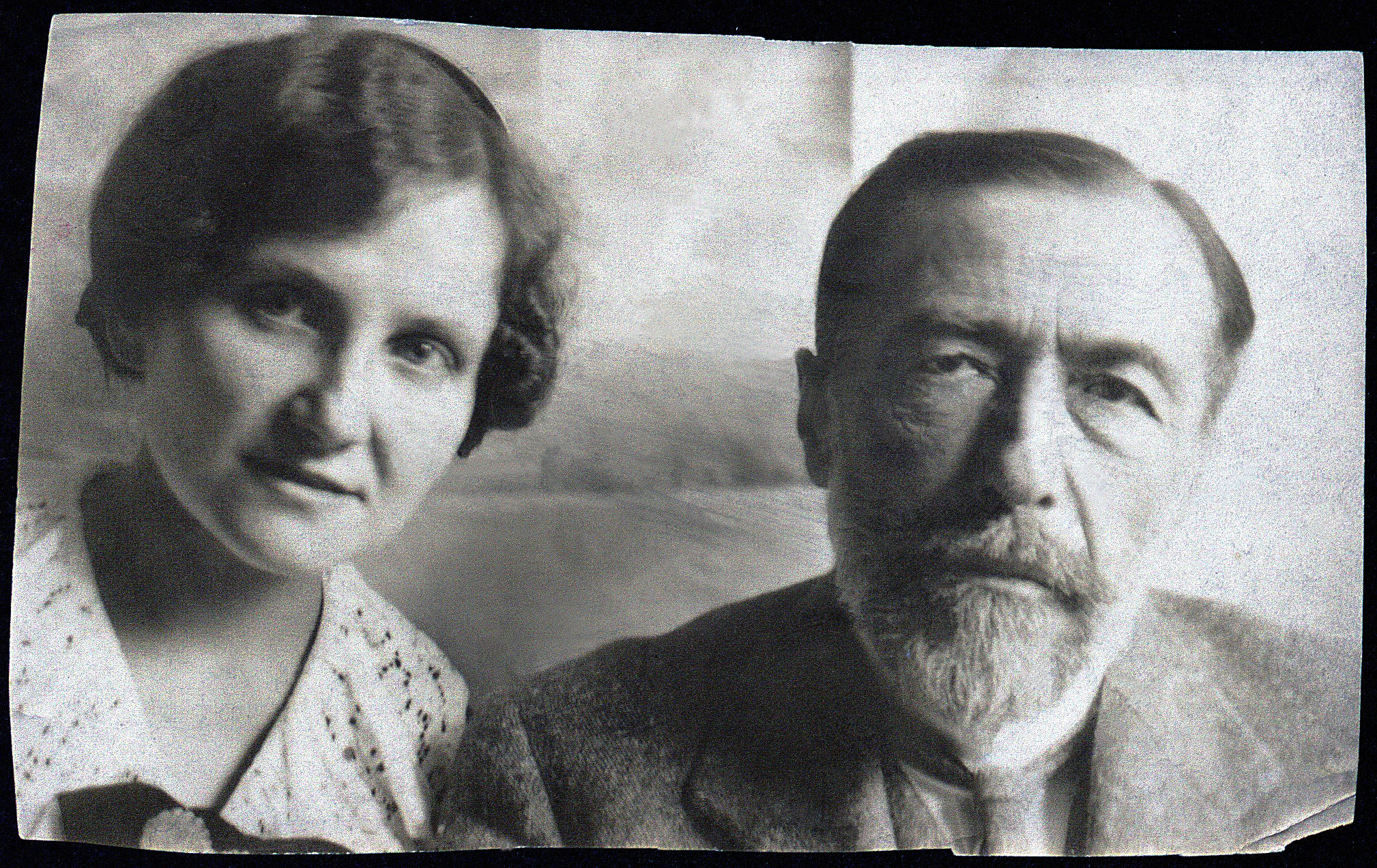
Aniela Zagórska and Joseph Conrad, 1914

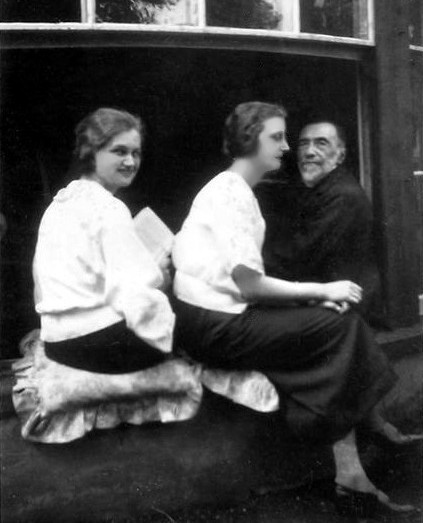
Conrad's nieces: Aniela (left) and Karola Zagórska with Joseph Conrad.

Aniela Zagórska's Polish translation of Conrad's Lord Jim, vol. 1 of 2, with foreword by Stefan Żeromski, 1933. Click on the image to open the book.

== Life ==
Aniela Zagórska was a niece of Joseph Conrad. In 1923–39 she translated nearly all of Conrad's works into Polish. In 1929, for these translations, she received a Polish PEN Club award.

When in 1914 at the outbreak of World War I Conrad had returned to his native Poland for the first time since departing it, he had taken refuge with his family in the southern-mountain resort town of Zakopane. A few days after arrival there, they had moved to the Konstantynówka pension operated by Conrad's cousin Aniela Zagórska, the namesake mother of the future translator; the pension had earlier been frequented by celebrities including the statesman Józef Piłsudski and Conrad's acquaintance, the young concert pianist Artur Rubinstein.

The elder Zagórska had introduced Conrad to Polish writers, intellectuals and artists who had also taken refuge in Zakopane, including novelist Stefan Żeromski and Tadeusz Nalepiński, a writer friend of anthropologist Bronisław Malinowski. Conrad roused interest among the Poles as a famous writer and an exotic compatriot from abroad. He charmed new acquaintances, especially women. However, the double Nobel laureate Maria Skłodowska-Curie's physician sister, Bronisława Dłuska, scolded him for having used his great talent for purposes other than bettering the future of his native land

But thirty-two-year-old Aniela Zagórska (daughter of the pension keeper), Conrad's niece who would translate his works into Polish in 1923–39, idolized him, kept him company, and provided him with books. He particularly delighted in the stories and novels of the ten-years-older, recently deceased Bolesław Prus, read everything by his fellow victim of Poland's 1863 Uprising – "my beloved Prus" – that he could get his hands on, and pronounced him "better than Dickens" – a favorite English novelist of Conrad's.

Translation, like other arts, inescapably involves choice, and choice implies interpretation. Conrad, whose writings have been described as verging on "auto-translation" from his Polish and French linguistic personae, would later advise his niece and Polish translator Aniela Zagórska:

[D]on't trouble to be too scrupulous... I may tell you (in French) that in my opinion "il vaut mieux interpréter que traduire" ["it is better to interpret than to translate"].... Il s'agit donc de trouver les équivalents. Et là, ma chère, je vous prie laissez vous guider plutôt par votre tempérament que par une conscience sévère.... [It is, then, a question of finding the equivalent expressions. And there, my dear, I beg you to let yourself be guided more by your temperament than by a strict conscience....]

== Sources ==
- Ewa Głębicka [E.G.], "Aniela Zagórska", in Współcześni polscy pisarze i badacze literatury: Słownik biobibliograficzny (Contemporary Polish Writers and Scholars of Literature: A Biobibliographic Dictionary), vol. IX: W–Z, edited by Jadwiga Czachowska and Alicja Szałagan, Warsaw, 2004, pp. 346–49.
- Christopher Kasparek, "The translator's endless toil", The Polish Review, vol. XXVIII, no. 2, 1983, pp. 83–87.
- Zdzisław Najder, Conrad under Familial Eyes, Cambridge University Press, 1984, ISBN 0-521-25082-X.
- Zdzisław Najder, Joseph Conrad: A Life, Rochester, New York, Camden House, 2007, ISBN 978-1-57113-347-2.
