= Klak =

Klak may refer to:

- Kľak, a village and municipality in Slovakia
- KLAK, a radio station in Texas
- Harald Klak (c. 785 – c. 852), a king in Jutland
- Kłak, a Polish surname
