= Marta Wyka =

Polish literary historian (born 1938)

- Born: 7 January 1938
- Education: Jagiellonian University
- Scientific career
- Fields: history of literature
- Doctoral advisor: Henryk Markiewicz

Marta Wyka (born 7 January 1938) is a literary historian.

== Biography ==
The daughter of Kazimierz Wyka and Jadwiga née Szybińska.

She graduated from the Jagiellonian University. In 1968 she obtained doctorate at the Institute of Literary Research of the Polish Academy of Sciences upon thesis Gałczyński wobec wzorów literackich i prądów epoki supervised by Henryk Markiewicz.

She was a member of Polish Writers' Union (ZLP) from 1976 until its dissolution in 1983. In 1980 she obtained habilitation upon thesis Brzozowski i jego powieści. In 1985 she married sociologist Zbigniew Pucek. In 1989 she became a member of Polish Writers Association. In 1992 she became editor-in-chief of the monthly journal “Dekada Literacka”. From 1999 until 2009 she was head of the Department of Contemporary Criticism at the Faculty of Polish Studies of the Jagiellonian University. She supervised three doctoral dissertations. From 2007 until 2009 she was a member of the jury of Nike Award.

== Books ==
- Gałczyński a wzory literackie. Warszawa: Państwowy Instytut Wydawniczy. 1970.
- Brzozowski i jego powieści. Kraków: Wydawnictwo Literackie. 1981.
- Leopold Staff. Warszawa: Państwowy Instytut Wydawniczy. 1985.
- Głosy różnych pokoleń – szkice literackie. Kraków: Znak. 1989.
- Szkice z epoki powinności. Kraków: Universitas. 1996.
- Światopoglądy młodopolskie. Kraków: Universitas. 1996.
- Krakowskie dziecko. Kraków: Wydawnictwo Literackie. 1998.
- Punkty widzenia – szkice. Kraków: Wydawnictwo Literackie. 2000.
- Niecierpliwość krytyki. Studia i szkice z lat 1961–2005. Kraków: Universitas. 2007.
- Przypisy do życia. Kraków: Wydawnictwo Literackie. 2007.
- Czytanie Brzozowskiego. Kraków: Universitas. 2012.
- Miłosz i rówieśnicy. Kraków: Universitas. 2013.
- Przypomniałam sobie. Kraków: Wydawnictwo Literackie. 2015.

=== Editions ===
- Literatura – język – kultura. Galicja i jej Dziedzictwo. Rzeszów: Wydawnictwo Wyższej Szkoły Pedagogicznej w Rzeszowie. 1995. Co-edited with Czesław Kłak.

== Distinctions and awards ==
- Knight's Cross of the Order of Polonia Restituta (1997)
- Kraków Book of the Month Award for the book Przypisy do życia (June 2007)

== Bibliography ==
- Czachowska, Jadwiga; Szałagan, Alicja (2004). "Wyka Marta". Współcześni polscy pisarze i badacze literatury: słownik biobibliograficzny. Vol. 9. Warszawa: Wydawnictwa szkolne i pedagogiczne Spółka akcyjna. p. 325. ISBN 978-83-02-09242-8.
