= Bolesław Faron =

Polish literary historian, critic, columnist, politician, and diplomat (born 1937)

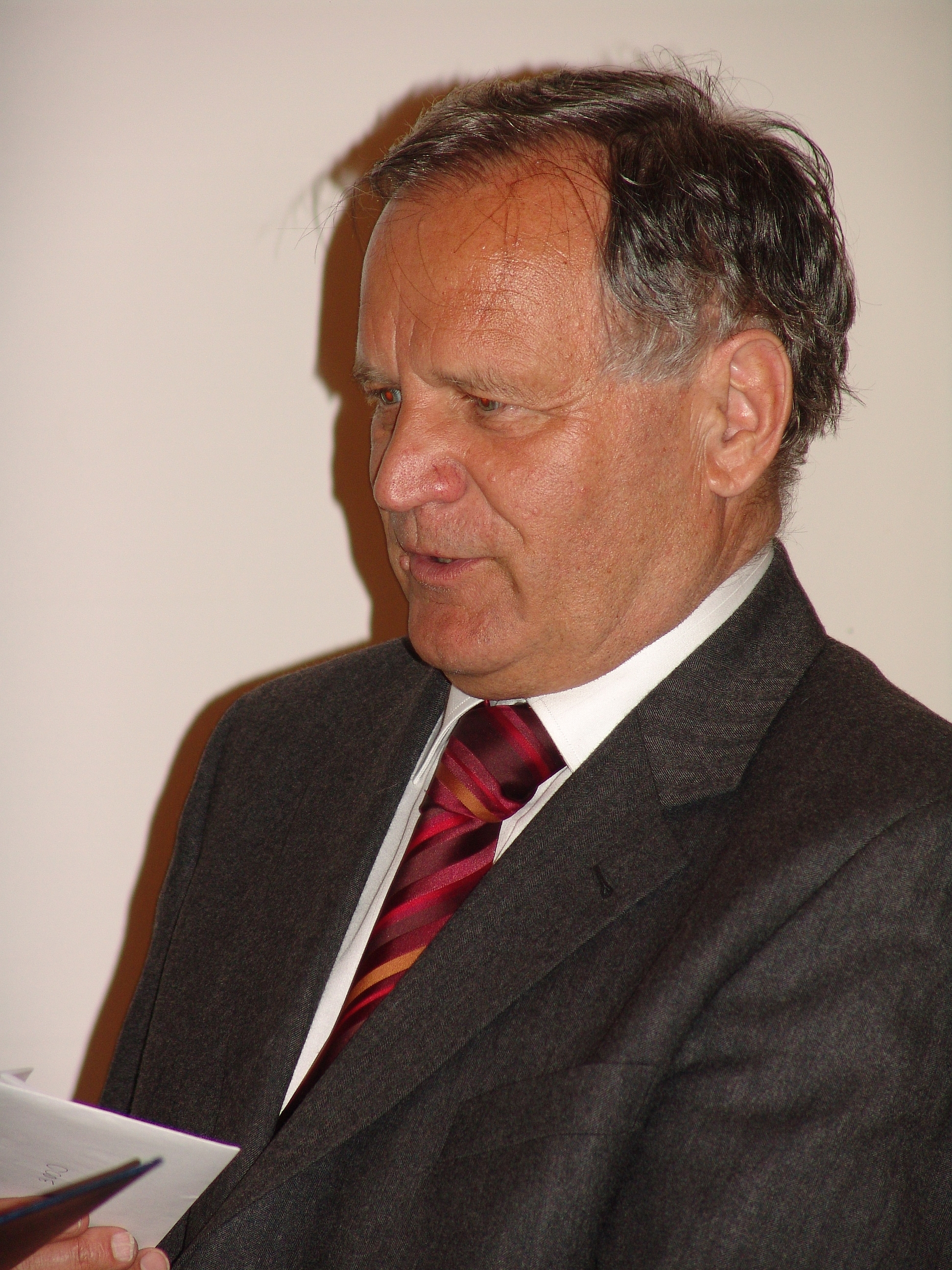
- Bolesław Faron, 2007
- Born: 17 February 1937 (age 89); Czarny Potok, Lesser Poland Voivodeship, Second Polish Republic
- Occupations: Literary historian, literary critic

Bolesław Faron (born 17 February 1937) is a literary historian and ciritc specializing in the history of Polish literature, columnist, politician and diplomat, Poland's minister of education (1981–1985) and director of Polish Institute in Vienna (1986–1990).

== Biography ==
The son of Jan Faron, a farmer, and Anna née Pulit, brother of Stanisław Faron. He attended Jan Długosz High School in Nowy Sącz in Nowy Sącz. From 1954 he studied Polish philology at the Higher School of Pedagogy in Kraków (WSP), obtaining a master's degree in 1958. From 1952 until 1956 he was a member of Union of Polish Youth. In 1956 he became a member of the Polish United Workers' Party (PZPR). From 1958 he worked in secondary and higher education: he was a tutor in the dormitory of the Basic Vocational School in Nowa Huta (until 1961) and a Polish language teacher at the King Jan Sobieski High School in Kraków (1958–1964). He also worked at the Higher School of Pedagogy (WSP; from 1958), initially as a librarian, then as an assistant, senior assistant, and adjunct professor.

In 1966 at the Higher School of Pedagogy (WSP) he obtained doctorate upon thesis Twórczość Zbigniewa Uniłowskiego na tle prozy drugiego dziesięciolecia międzywojennego supervised by Jan Nowakowski (literary historian). In 1975 he obtained his habilitation based on his thesis Stefan Kołaczkowski jako krytyk i historyk literatury. In the years 1971–1975 he was a vice-rector and in the years 1975–1981 he was a rector of the Higher School of Pedagogy in Kraków.

In 1975, he became a member of the Voivodeship Committee of the Polish United Workers' Party in Kraków and a member of the "Kuźnica" Club of Cultural Creators and Activists in Kraków. From 1977 to 1981, he was editor-in-chief of "Ruch Literacki".

From February 1981 to 1986, he was a minister of education. In 1981, he was elected an alternate member of the Central Committee of the Polish United Workers' Party. In the years 1986–1990 he was a counselor for cultural and scientific affairs at the Embassy of the Polish People's Republic in Vienna and director of the Polish Institute in Vienna. He was on scholarships in Vienna and Salzburg (1992), and in Trier, Nancy, Brussels and Leuven (1994).

From 1993 he was the president of the management board, and from 1995 the director of scientific and publishing affairs of the Kraków branch of Wydawnictwo Edukacyjne, that he co-founded with Agnieszka Kłakówna. From 2000 until 2006, he was director of the Institute of Polish Philology at the Pedagogical University of Kraków (previously WSP). He became a member of Klub Przyjaciół Ziemi Sądeckiej.

He specialized in the literature of Young Poland, the interwar period, and contemporary writing; including in the works of Władysław Orkan and Zbigniew Uniłowski. He published in journals: "Ruch Literacki", "Miesięcznik Literacki", "Twórczość", "Odra", "Lektura", "Nowe Książki", "Życie Literackie", "Nowa Polszczyzna". He supervised eight doctoral dissertations. Agnieszka Kłakówna was among his doctoral students. His pen name was Andrzej Turek.

He married Barbara Rejdych.

== Books ==
- Zbigniew Uniłowski. Kraków: Państwowe Wydawnictwo Naukowe. 1969.
- Stanisław Piętak. Kraków: Państwowe Wydawnictwo Naukowe. 1971.
- Współczesna poezja polska. Kraków: Wydawnictwo Naukowe WSP. 1971. Co-authored with Stanisław Burkot.
- Stefan Kołaczkowski jako krytyk i historyk literatury. Wrocław: Ossolineum. 1976.
- Oświatowe przekroje i zbliżenia. Warszawa: Ksia̜żka i Wiedza. 1985.
- Spotkania i powroty: sylwetki i szkice o literaturze. Warszawa: Wydawnictwo Edukacyjne. 1995. ISBN 83-86663-08-1.
- Jama Michalika: przewodnik literacki. Kraków: Oficyna ¿7FCracovia". 1995. ISBN 83-85104-79-8.
- Władysław Orkan. Kraków: Wydawnictwo Edukacyjne. 2004. ISBN 83-89434-70-9.
- Okruchy: szkice o literaturze i kulturze XX wieku. Kraków: Wydawnictwo Edukacyjne. 2005.
- Powrót do korzeni. Kraków: Wydawnictwo Edukacyjne. 2000. ISBN 83-88365-01-0. Memoirs.
- ...z podróży. Kraków: Wydawnictwo Edukacyjne. 2007. ISBN 9788365669957.
- Powrót do korzeni: nowy. Kraków: Wydawnictwo Edukacyjne. 2010. ISBN 978-83-61009-30-6.

=== Editions ===
- Prozaicy dwudziestolecia międzywojennego. Sylwetki. Warszawa: Wiedza Powszechna. 1972.
- Orkan, Władysław (1975). Komornicy i opowiadania wybrane. Warszawa.
- Uniłowski, Zbigniew (1976). Wspólny pokój i inne utwory. Wrocław; Warszawa; Kraków; Gdańsk: Zakład narodowy imienia Ossolińskich.
- Uniłowski, Zbigniew (1981). Żyto w dżungli ; Pamiętnik morski ; Reportaże. Kraków: Wydawnictwo Literackie. ISBN 83-08-00418-0.

== Distinctions ==
- Knight's Cross of the Order of Polonia Restituta (1974)
- Silver Cross of Merit (1969)
- Medal of the Commission of National Education (1975)
- Officer's Cross of the Order of Polonia Restituta (1985)
- Silver Star of Peoples' Friendship (1985)
- Badge of honorary title "Zasłużony Nauczyciel Polskiej Rzeczypospolitej Ludowej" (Meritorious Teacher of the Polish People's Republic, 1989)
- Commander's Cross of the Order of Polonia Restituta "for outstanding achievements in scientific and teaching work." (6 August 2001)
- Silver Gloria Artis Medal for Merit to Culture (2025)

== Accolades ==
- Awards of the Minister of Science, Higher Education and Technology (2nd degree in 1976 and 1977, 1st degree in 1977, 1978, 1979, 1980)
