= Markowicz =

Markowicz is a Polish-language surname of East Slavic origin. It is a patronymic surname derived from the given name Mark. The East Slavic spelling is Markovich. Notable people with the surname include:

- André Markowicz (born 1960) French translator and poet
- Artur Markowicz (1872–1934), Polish artist
- Helena Markowicz (1902–1985), Polish historian, Communist activist and mayor of security service
- Maria Markowicz-Łohinowicz (1933–1974), Polish chemist and geologist
- Michał Markowicz (1927–2010), Polish politician and MP

== See also ==
- Markowitz (disambiguation)
- Markiewicz
- Markovič
- Marković
- Markovics
- Markovits
- Markov
