= Kłak =

Kłak is a Polish surname. Notable people include:

- Aleksander Kłak (born 1970), Polish footballer
- Czesław Kłak (born 1935), Polish literary historian
