= Czesław Kłak =

Polish literary historian (born 1935)

- Born: 21 April 1935 (age 91); Hadle Szklarskie
- Citizenship: Polish
- Education: Jagiellonian University
- Occupation: Literary historian

Czesław Stanisław Kłak (born 21 April 1935) is a literary historian.

== Biography ==
Kłak was born in Hadle Szklarskie near Przeworsk to a peasant family. His younger sister Agnieszka was born in 1950. He completed his secondary education in 1952. He graduated from Jagiellonian University (UJ) with a master's degree in Polish philology in 1956.

He began his career as a Polish teacher in Jarosław, and then in 1961 became a librarian in Rzeszów. He simultaneously edited the cultural supplement "Widnokrąg" for the newspaper "Nowiny Rzeszowskie".

In November 1963 he became a faculty member in the Department of Polish Literature at the newly established Higher School of Education in Krakow (WSP). In 1964 he became senior assistant to the Chair of Polish Literature and Language.

He obtained a doctoral degree from WSP in 1969 with a dissertation titled Powieści historyczne Jana Zachariasiewicza (Jan Zachariasiewicz's Historical Novels) under the supervision of Wincenty Danek.

His areas of research included nineteenth-century Polish literature and the work of Stanisław Pigoń. In 1990 he obtained habilitation degree. He supervised five doctoral dissertations.

== Books ==
- Polski Leonidas. Rzecz o legendzie historycznej i literackiej generała Józefa Sowińskiego. Warszawa: Ludowa Spółdzielnia Wydawnicza. 1986.
- Romantyczne tematy i dylematy. Echa powstania listopadowego w literaturze, historiografii i publicystyce. Rzeszów: Wydawnictwo Wyższej Szkoły Pedagogicznej w Rzeszowie. 1992.
- Stanisław Pigoń. Szkice do portretu. Rzeszów: Wydawnictwo Wyższej Szkoły Pedagogicznej w Rzeszowie. 1993.
- Pisarze galicyjscy. Szkice literackie. Rzeszów: Wydawnictwo Wyższej Szkoły Pedagogicznej w Rzeszowie. 1994.
- Dialog o dialogu. Marii Danilewicz Zielińskiej podzwonne. Rzeszów: Wydawnictwo Uniwersytetu Rzeszowskiego. 2003.
- Pigoń. Rzeszów: Wydawnictwo Uniwersytetu Rzeszowskiego. 2013.

=== Editions ===
- Wokół Stanisława Pigonia. Nad warsztatem naukowym i literackim Uczonego. Rzeszów: Krajowa Agencja Wydawnicza. 1983.
- Literatura – język – kultura. Galicja i jej Dziedzictwo. Rzeszów: Wydawnictwo Wyższej Szkoły Pedagogicznej w Rzeszowie. 1995. Co-edited with Marta Wyka.

== Distinctions ==
- Gold Cross of Merit (1979)
- Knight's Cross of the Order of Polonia Restituta
- Medal of the Commission of National Education
