= Milotice =

- Municipality
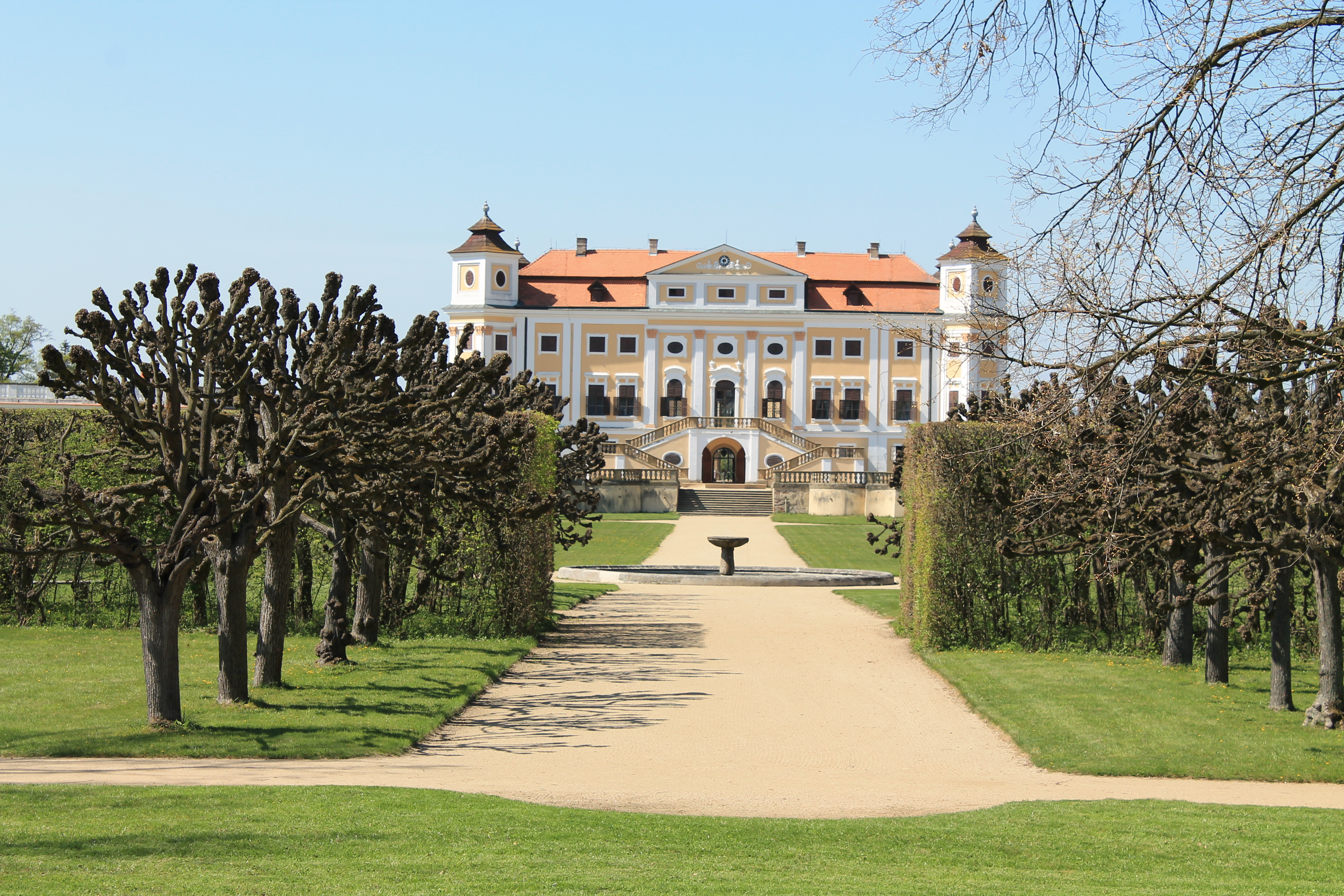
- Milotice Castle

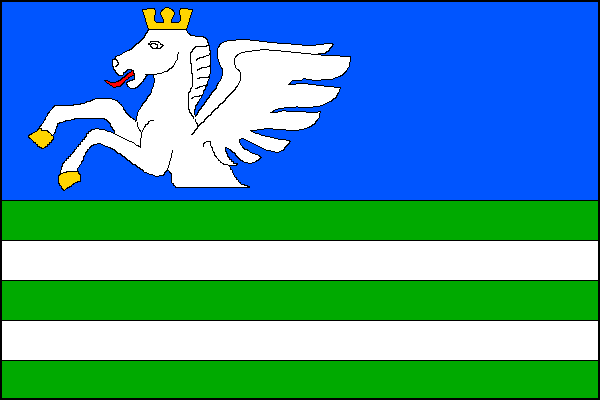
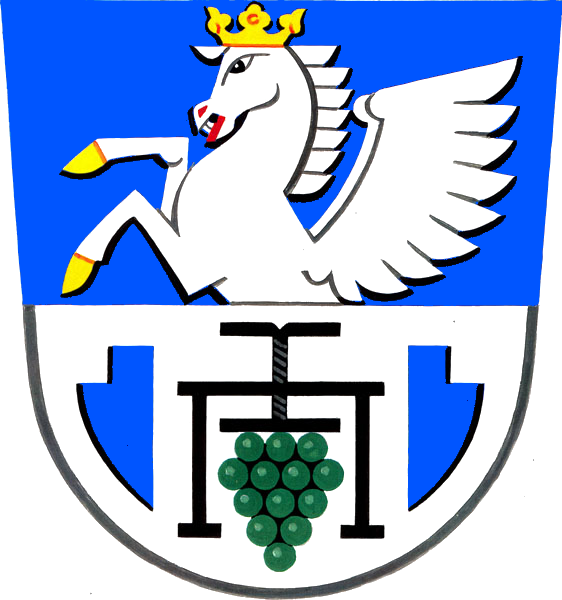
- Flag Coat of arms

- Location in the Czech Republic
- Coordinates: 48°57′19″N 17°8′33″E
- Country: Czech Republic
- Region: South Moravian
- District: Hodonín
- First mentioned: 1341

Area
  - Total: 12.66 km^{2} (4.89 sq mi)
- Elevation: 184 m (604 ft)

Population (2026-01-01)
  - Total: 1,884
  - Density: 148.8/km^{2} (385.4/sq mi)
- Time zone: UTC+1 (CET)
  - Summer (DST): UTC+2 (CEST)
- Postal code: 696 05
- Website: www.milotice.cz

Milotice (German: Milotitz) is a municipality and village in Hodonín District in the South Moravian Region of the Czech Republic. It has about 1,900 inhabitants. It is known for the Milotice Castle, which is protected as a national cultural monument.

== Geography ==
Milotice is located about 11 kilometres (7 mi) north of Hodonín and 45 km (28 mi) southeast of Brno. It lies in a flat landscape of the Lower Morava Valley. In the eastern part of the municipality is located the fishpond Písečný rybník, protected as a nature reserve.

== History ==
The first written mention of Milotice is from 1341. A fortress in Milotice was first mentioned in 1360. During the Hussite Wars in 1427, the Hussites founded a fortified military camp around the fortress. In the 15th and 16th centuries, the village often changed its owners. The owners include the Lords of Moravany, Lords of Kravaře, Lords of Ojnice, Lords of Zástřizly, the Zierotin family, and Václav Hagvic of Biskupice. Thanks to income from viticulture and fish farming, it prospered.

In 1586, Milotice was acquired by Bernard Ludwig Tovar of Enzesfeld. He had rebuilt the old water fortress into a Renaissance residence. Until 1648, Milotice changed owners very frequently, which led to a loss of its value. From 1648 to 1811, it was property of the Serényi noble family, and then it was managed by female descendants of the house. In 1670, the corner towers and additional floor were added to the castle. From 1888 until 1945, the castle was owned by the Seilern-Aspang family. In 1945, the castle was confiscated from them by the state.

== Demographics ==
Historical population

Year	Pop.	±%
1869	1,016	—
1880	1,012	−0.4%
1890	1,051	+3.9%
1900	1,216	+15.7%
1910	1,376	+13.2%

Year	Pop.	±%
1921	1,463	+6.3%
1930	1,510	+3.2%
1950	1,560	+3.3%
1961	1,669	+7.0%
1970	1,670	+0.1%

Year	Pop.	±%
1980	1,736	+4.0%
1991	1,877	+8.1%
2001	1,947	+3.7%
2011	1,853	−4.8%
2021	1,771	−4.4%

Source: Censuses

== Transport ==
There are no railways or major roads passing through the municipality.

== Sights ==
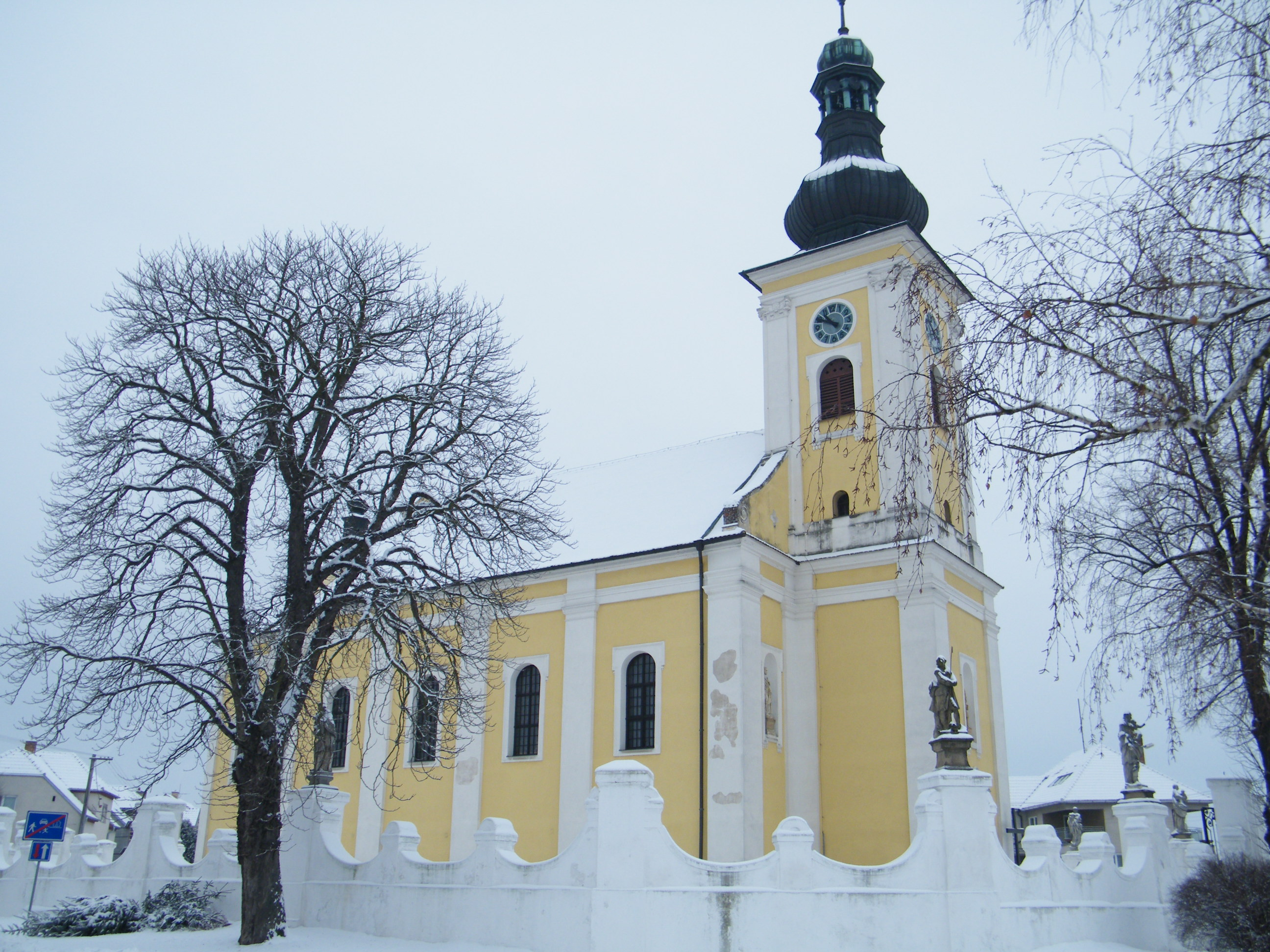
Church of All Saints

The current appearance of the Milotice Castle is from the first half of the 18th century, when Baroque reconstructions were made. Today Milotice Castle is one of the main tourist destinations in the region. The castle includes a French formal garden, which was partly modified into an English park in the early 19th century. The castle is protected as a national cultural monument.

A notable landmark of Milotice is the Church of All Saints. It was built in the early Baroque style in 1697–1703. In 1787, the cemetery next the church was abolished and a wall was built around the church, which was decorated with a set of nine valuable Baroque statues of saints.

== Notable people ==
- Moritz Loth (1832–1913), American businessman
