= LOTH =

The acronym LOTH can stand for:

- Language of thought hypothesis
- Liturgy of the Hours

== See also ==
- Loth (disambiguation)
