= Janusz Barta =

Polish jurist and legal advisor (1947–2021)

- Born: 1947
- Died: 2021 (aged 73–74)
- Occupations: Jurist, legal advisor
- Employer: Jagiellonian University

Academic background
- Education: Jagiellonian University

Janusz Maria Barta (1947–2021) was a Polish jurist and legal advisor. He was a professor at the Jagiellonian University.

== Biography ==
The son of Karol Barta and Anna née Simon, medical doctors. In 1970 he graduated with a master's degree in law from the Jagiellonian University. In 1977 he obtained doctorate at the Jagiellonian University upon dissertation Dzieło muzyczne i jego twórca w świetle przepisów prawa autorskiego (The musical work and its creator in the light of copyright law). In 1988 he obtained habilitation. He supervised five doctoral dissertations. He was a fan of Cracovia football team.

== Works ==
- Dzieło muzyczne i jego twórca w świetle przepisów prawa autorskiego. Państwowe Wydawnictwo Naukowe. 1980.
- Główne problemy prawa komputerowego. Warszawa: Wydawnictwa Naukowo-Techniczne. 1993. Co-authored with Ryszard Markiewicz.
- Komentarz do ustawy o prawie autorskim i prawach prokrewnych. 1995. 2001. Co-authored with Ryszard Markiewicz.
- Prawo autorskie w Światowej Organizacji Handlu. Towarzystwo Autorów i Wydawców Prac Naukowych Universitas. 1996. Co-authored with Ryszard Markiewicz.
- Internet a prawo. 1998. Co-authored with Ryszard Markiewicz.
- Prawo autorskie. 1998. Co-authored with Ryszard Markiewicz.
- Prawo autorskie, Przepisy. Orzecznictwo. Umowy międzynarodowe. Wydawnictwo ABC. 1999. Co-authored with Ryszard Markiewicz.
- Ochrona danych osobowych. Komentarz. Kraków. 2001. 2015. Co-authored with Ryszard Markiewicz.
- Prawo autorskie i prawa pokrewne: wprowadzenie. Wolters Kluwer. 2024. ISBN 978-83-8390-056-8. Co-authored with Ryszard Markiewicz. Posthumously.

== Awards ==
- Knight's Cross of the Order of Polonia Restituta (2003)
