= Polish Studies Program at the University of Wisconsin–Madison =

Academic Program

Polish Studies Program at the University of Wisconsin–Madison (UW–Madison) is the oldest academic program in existence with the focus on the study and teaching of the Polish language, literature, and culture in the United States. Polish language instruction began in the fall semester of 1936 and has been offered at the University of Wisconsin–Madison ever since. The Polish program is offered by the UW–Madison Department of German, Nordic, and Slavic+. As a result, with the foundation of the Department of Polish at the University of Wisconsin-Madison in 1936, the teaching of Slavic languages and literatures started.

== History ==
The Polish Studies Program at the University of Wisconsin–Madison traces its history back to 1935, when the combined effort of the local Polish American community and state legislators led to the establishment of the Department of Polish (1936), the first academic program devoted to the teaching of the Polish language, literature, and culture in the United States. First Polish classes at UW–Madison were held in the fall semester of 1936 and have been offered there ever since. Initially, Polish classes were taught by visiting professors from Poland. Chronologically, this cohort included Jerzy Kuryłowicz from the University of Lviv (1936), Witold Doroszewski from the University of Warsaw (1936–1937), and Joseph A. Birkenmajer (1937–1939). The latter two were also the first chairpersons of the department, which, at the time, consisted of the Polish lecturer exclusively. Edmund Zawacki, who started teaching Polish at UW–Madison in 1939, continued to work there until 1978. Zawacki, the first recipient of a Ph.D. degree in Slavic languages and literatures in the United States, also became the third chairperson of the department, a position in which he served until 1960. After Zawacki's retirement in 1978, Lillian Vallee took the post of the Polish lecturer in the department, having worked in this capacity for the next four years. In 1982, Halina Filipowicz was hired as the head of the Polish studies, a position she has held until her retirement. In 2019, Łukasz Wodzyński succeeded Filipowicz as the professor of Polish.

In 1942, the Department of Polish changed its name to the Department of Slavic Languages, a move that saw the unit broaden its academic scope to include Russian language offerings. This trend continued in the years to come as several other Slavic and non-Slavic languages were added. During that time, the department started offering classes in Bulgarian, Czech, Old Church Slavic, Serbo-Croatian (all Slavic), as well as some Turkic languages: Kazakh, Tatar, and Uzbek. Of those, Czech, Old Church Slavic, and Serbo-Croatian continue to be offered to this day, along with Polish and Russian. Currently, the Polish Studies Program at UW–Madison makes part of the academic programs offered through the Department of German, Nordic, and Slavic+.

In 2011, the then-Department of Slavic Languages and Literature was awarded the Polonicum Award Distinction, presented by the University of Warsaw Center for Polish Language and Culture for Foreigners, in recognition of its achievements in the area of teaching, researching, and promoting Polish language, literature, and culture. The UW–Madison Polish program won for its engagement in the education and popularization of Polish culture among the wider audience. The award was accepted by Dr. Ewa Miernowska, the program's Polish lecturer since 1993, during the 2011 Awards Ceremony that took place on November 28, 2011, in Warsaw, Poland, and included the chancellor of the University of Warsaw, among other guests. The Polonicum Award is presented each year and the Award Committee includes the Minister of Science and Higher Education of Poland, the Minister of Culture and National Heritage, and the chancellor of the University of Warsaw, among others.

UW–Madison remains one of the few U.S. universities that offers a Polish major. As of 2020, Polish is one of the four undergraduate majors offered by the Department of German, Nordic, and Slavic+.

== Madison Polish Film Festival ==
The Madison Polish Film Festival, an annual screening of most recent Polish cinematic productions, is organized by the UW–Madison Polish Studies Program and members of the Polish Student Association there, in collaboration with other groups. The Festival has been initiated in the early 1990s by the long-time UW–Madison Polish language lecturer, Dr. Ewa Miernowska, who began teaching Polish at the University of Wisconsin–Madison in 1993. The first edition of the Madison Polish Film Festival took place in 1991. Thus, the Madison Polish Film Festival ranks among the oldest film festivals (co)organized by the UW–Madison student body. For 25 years since its inceptions, the Festival has screened more than 120 Polish films, becoming a cultural event for both the Madison-based Polish-American community and the local community a large.

In 2010, the Polish Festival Festival in Madison, Wisconsin, hosted the Polish film director Filip Bajon, whose historical drama War of Love (Pol. Śluby panieńskie), a film adaptation of the 1832 play by Aleksander Fredro under the same title, opened the Festival that year. In the 2010s, the Festival became a major cinematic event in Madison, attracting hundreds of viewers. For instance, in 2013, the Polish films presented there were screened to more than 400 viewers, in 2015 – to more than 600 viewers, while a year later – to more than 500 viewers. Among the films presented at previous editions are such contemporary Polish cinema hits as the drama Little Rose (Pol. Różyczka, dir. by Jan Kidawa-Błoński), as well as the comedies Testosterone (Pol. Testosteron, dir. by Tomasz Konecki and Andrzej Saramonowicz) and Planet Single (Pol. Planeta singli, dir. by Mitja Okorn). In November 2020, it was confirmed that the 2020 edition of the Madison Polish Film Festival will take place on December 5–6 and will be held entirely online.

In 2018, the following Polish films were screened during the Madison Polish Film Festival:

- Happiness of the World (Pol. Szczęście świata, dir. by Michał Rosa)
- The Butler (Pol. Kamerdyner, dir. by Filip Bajon)
- Squadron 303 (Pol. Dywizjon 303. Historia prawdziwa, dir. by Denis Delić)
- Breaking the Limits (Pol. Najlepszy, dir. by Łukasz Palkowski)

In 2019, the following Polish films were screened during the Madison Polish Film Festival:

- Mister T. (Pol. Pan T., dir. by Marcin Krzyształowicz)
- Playing Hard (Pol. Zabawa, zabawa, dir. by Kinga Dębska)
- Taxing Love (Pol. Podatek od miłości, dir. by Bartłomiej Ignaciuk)
- Clergy (Pol. Kler, dir. by Wojciech Smarzowski)

In 2020, the following Polish films were screened during the Madison Polish Film Festival (all online due to the COVID-19 pandemic):

- I Never Cry (Pol. Jak najdalej stąd, dir. by Piotr Domalewski)
- The Iron Bridge (Pol. Żelazny most, dir. by Monika Jordan-Młodzianowska)
- Icarus. The Legend of Mietek Kosz (Pol. Ikar. Legenda Mietka Kosza, dir. by Maciej Pieprzyca)

In 2021, the Madison Polish Film Festival founder Dr. Ewa Miernowska received a prestigious distinction at the annual Polish Film Festival in America in Chicago in recognition of her efforts in promoting Polish cinema in North America.

== See also ==
- Polish studies
- Slavic studies
- University of Wisconsin–Madison
