= Paweł Mościcki =

Polish philosopher (born 1981)

- Born: 1981
- Citizenship: Polish
- Education: University of Warsaw
- Occupation: Philosopher
- Website: pawelmoscicki.net

Paweł Krzysztof Mościcki (born 1981) is a philosopher and literary scholar who works at the Institute of Literary Research of the Polish Academy of Sciences.

== Biography ==
In 2005 he graduated in cultural studies from the University of Warsaw. In 2012 he obtained doctorate from the Institute of Philosophy and Sociology of the Polish Academy of Sciences. In 2018 he obtained habilitation.

== Books ==
- Polityka teatru. Eseje o sztuce angażującej. Warszawa: Wydawnictwo Krytyki Politycznej. 2008. ISBN 978-83-61006-40-4.
- Godard. Pasaże. Kraków: Ha!art. 2010. ISBN 978-83-61407-71-3.
- Idea potencjalności. Możliwość filozofii według Giorgio Agambena. Warszawa: Wydawnictwo IBL PAN. 2012. ISBN 978-83-61757-31-3.
- My też mamy już przeszłość. Guy Debord i historia jako pole bitwy. Warszawa: Bęc Zmiana. 2015. ISBN 978-83-62418-46-6.
- Foto-konstelacje. Wokół Marka Piaseckiego. Warszawa: Bęc Zmiana. 2016. ISBN 978-83-62418-73-2.
- Migawki z tradycji uciśnionych. Warszawa: Książka i Prasa. 2017. ISBN 83-65304-53-8.
- Chaplin. Przewidywanie teraźniejszości. Gdańsk: słowo/obraz terytoria. 2017. ISBN 978-83-7453-483-3.
- Lekcje futbolu. Gdańsk: Wydawnictwo W Podwórku. 2019. ISBN 978-83-64134-27-2.
- Azyl. Warszawa: Wydawnictwo Nisza. 2022. ISBN 83-66599-38-8.
- Wyższa aktualność. Studia o współczesności Dantego. Kraków: Wydawnictwo Uniwersytetu Jagiellońskiego. 2022. ISBN 978-83-233-5144-3.
- Kontinuum nieszczęścia. Bernhard, Handke. Kraków: Wydawnictwo Austeria. 2023. ISBN 978-83-7866-652-3.
- Gaza. Rzecz o kulturze eksterminacji. Kraków: Karakter. 2025. ISBN 978-83-68059-73-1.

=== Editions ===
- Maurice Blanchot. Literatura ekstremalna [Maurice Blanchot. The Extreme Literature]. Warsaw. 2007. ISBN 9788361006046.

== Accolades ==
- Bolesław Michałek Award for the book Chaplin. Przewidywanie teraźniejszości (2018)
