= Beata Dorosz =

Literary historian, bibliographer and editor (born 1956)

- Born: 1956 (age 69–70)
- Occupations: Literary historian, bibliographer, editor

Academic background
- Education: University of Warsaw
- Alma mater: IBL PAN
- Thesis: Jan Lechoń, Mieczysław Grydzewski: Listy 1923-1956 (Dwugłos korespondencyjny) (2006)
- Doctoral advisor: Roman Loth
- Website: Beata Dorosz publications on Academia.edu

Beata Maria Dorosz (born 1956) is a literary historian, professor at the Institute of Literary Research of the Polish Academy of Sciences (IBL PAN).

== Biography ==
In 1979 she graduated in Polish philology from the University of Warsaw. In 2006, upon dissertation Jan Lechoń, Mieczysław Grydzewski: Listy 1923-1956 (Dwugłos korespondencyjny) supervised by Roman Loth, she obtained her doctorate at IBL PAN. There, in 2013, she obtained habilitation. She became Secretary of the Scientific Council of IBL PAN.

Dorosz authored 17 entries in the dictionary Polish Writers and Literary Scholars of the 20th and 21st centuries.

== Works ==
=== Monographs ===
- Jarosław Iwaszkiewicz. Poradnik bibliograficzny. Warszawa. 1982. Co-authored with K. Nowak.
- Literatura i krytyka poza cenzurą 1977–1989. Bibliografia druków zwartych. Wrocław. 1991. Co-authored with Jadwiga Czachowska.
- Lechoń i Tuwim – dzieje trudnej przyjaźni. Warszawa. 2004.
- Nowojorski pasjans. Polski Instytut Naukowy w Ameryce. Jan Lechoń. Kazimierz Wierzyński. Warszawa. 2013.

=== Editions ===
- Jak się z wami zrosło moje życie. Prace dedykowane profesorowi Romanowi Lothowi. Instytut Badań Literackich PAN. 2011. ISBN 9788361552437. Co-edited with Paweł Kądziela.

=== Articles (available online) ===
- "Kazimierz Wierzyński w kręgu Polskiego Instytutu Naukowego" (PDF). Zeszyty Naukowe Uniwersytetu Rzeszowskiego (70): 44–88. 2011. Archived from the original (PDF) on 4 March 2016.
- "Czesław Miłosz w kręgu Polskiego Instytutu Naukowego w Nowym Jorku" (PDF). Archiwum emigracji. Studia – szkice – dokumenty. 14–15 (1–2). Toruń: 103–122. 2011. Archived from the original (PDF) on 24 April 2026.
- "Articles by Beata Dorosz in Teksty Drugie". tekstydrugie.pl. Archived from the original on 18 February 2026.

== Accolades ==
- Award of the Władysław and Nella Turański Foundation “for her entire achievements in the field of literary documentation and documentation of Polish culture and literature abroad, with particular emphasis on Nowojorski pasjans” (2013)
