= Antoni Nowak-Przygodzki =

Polish anti-communist exile and lawyer

- Born: 15 May 1897; Kraków
- Died: 4 January 1959 (aged 61); Paris
- Occupation: Lawyer

Antoni Michał Nowak-Przygodzki (15 May 1897, Jarosław – 4 January 1959, Paris) was a lawyer, a political activist, and a leading figure of the Polish anticommunist exile in France.

== Life ==
Born in 1897 in Jarosław, Galicia, Austria-Hungary, of he took part in World War I and later in the Polish–Ukrainian War. He also fought in the Soviet-Polish War as a lieutenant alongside General Józef Piłsudski. In recognition for his efforts, he was awarded the Cross of Valour in 1921. After completing a Ph.D. in 1919, he became a Professor of Law, he started conducting research, and he opened his own firm. In 1919, he married Zofia Gumowska, with whom he would have four children.

During World War II, he was not mobilized, but he became responsible for the handling of refugees coming to Lviv. After the arrival of the Red Army, he joined the underground resistance in September 1939 due to his prewar activities and left for Warsaw in the fall of 1940. He participated in Warsaw uprising and, after the defeat, he was sent to the Bergen-Belsen concentration camp. After his liberation by the British, he was charged with cultural and education tasks in the British zone of occupation in Germany until his demobilisation in 1947.

After the war, he settled in France. Close to the circle of Polish intellectuals connected to the exile magazine Kultura and the Institut littéraire in Maisons-Laffitte, he was a contributor for the journal Zeszytów Historycznych. He was also member and later Vicepresident of the Union of Polish War Refugees. In 1949, August Zaleski, President of the Polish Republic in Exile, named him member of the National Council of Poland established in London. From 1950 onwards, he was also active as an academic and teacher in different institutions such as Polish Historical and Literary Society in Paris and the Free Europe University in Exile in Strasbourg, until his death in 1959.

He was the father of Jadwiga Czachowska.

== Bibliography ==
- Veronika Durin-Hornyik (2019), "Le Collège de l’Europe libre et la préparation de la construction démocratique de l’Europe de l’Est (1948-1958)", Relations internationales, 2019/4, Nr 180, pp. 13–25.
- Veronika Durin-Hornyik (2018), Le Collège de l’Europe libre : une opération de guerre psychologique américaine menée en France à l’égard de la jeunesse des pays communistes de l’Europe de l’Est (1948-1958), doctoral dissertation, Université Paris-Est Créteil.
- Maria Nowak (2019), Pour notre liberté et la vôtre. Comment la Pologne a été abandonnée par ses alliés, Librinova.

== Archives ==
Antoni Nowak-Przygodzki's personal archives are currently held at the Polish Library in Paris. His collection mostly includes documents concerning his activities in the period following the Second World War.
