= Kazimierz Wyka =

Polish literary historian (1910–1975)

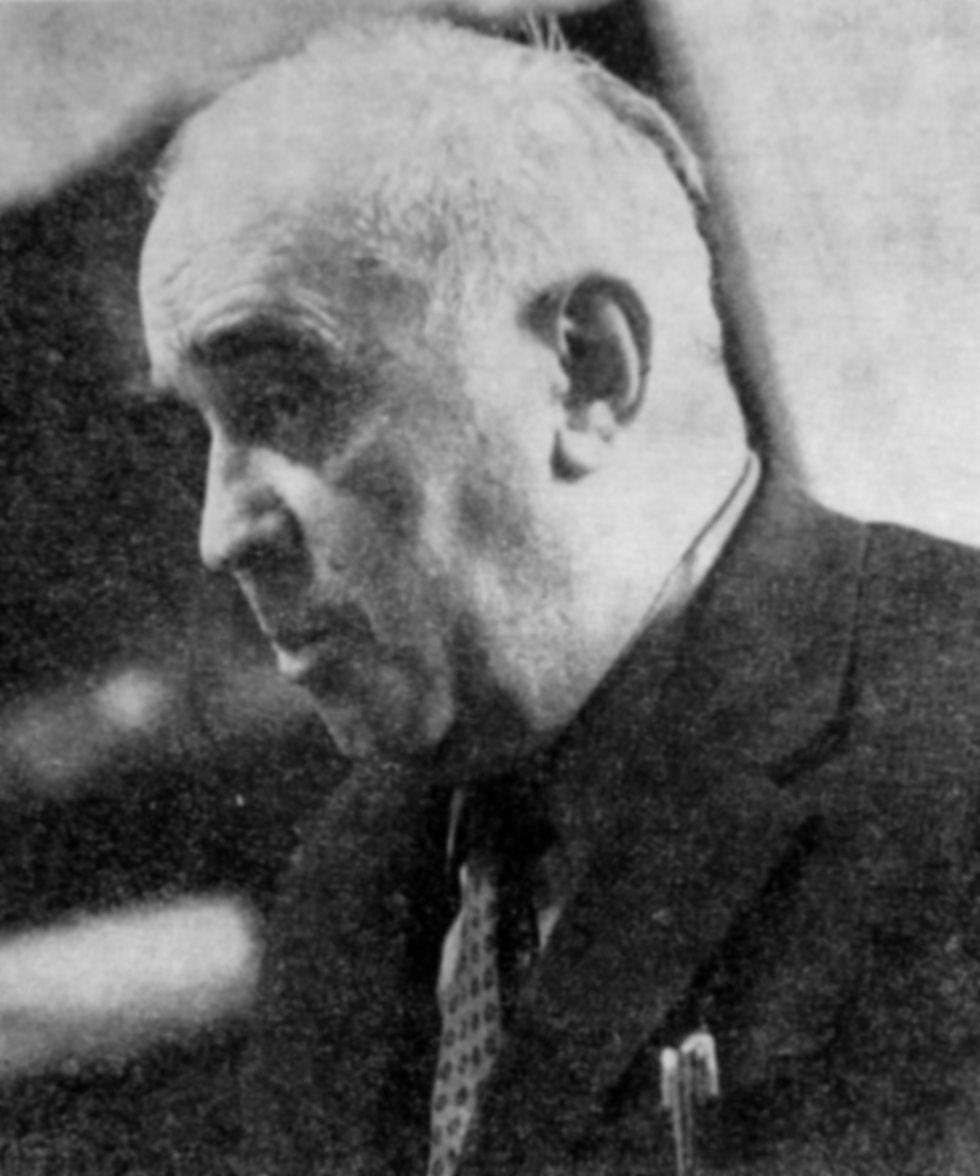
- Born: 19 March 1910; Krzeszowice
- Died: 19 January 1975 (aged 64); Kraków
- Occupations: Literary historian, literary critic

Kazimierz Wyka (19 March 1910 – 19 January 1975) was a Polish literary historian, literary critic, and professor at the Jagiellonian University in Kraków following World War II. He was a deputy to the Polish parliament (Sejm) from 1952 to 1956 during the era of Stalinism in Poland.

== Life ==
Wyka was the son of Wojciech Wyka, a small sawmill owner, and Maria née Piętakiewicz, born and raised in Krzeszowice. He studied at the Jagiellonian University and during the occupation of Poland by Nazi Germany remained safely with the family in his small town. He became active politically only after the Soviet takeover, and obtained a position as a professor at his Alma mater in 1948. In 1952 Wyka co-founded and ran the Polish–Soviet Friendship Society (Towarzystwo Przyjaźni Polsko-Radzieckiej), a cover for the direct Soviet propaganda in Poland, which enabled him to also remain a Member of Parliament in 1952–56 before the collapse of Stalinism during the Polish October. Notably Wyka signed the so-called "Letter of 34" (List 34) against censorship, delivered in March 1964 to the Council of Ministers (Poland) and then passed on to The Times. However, the resulting uproar in the communist party circles prompted Wyka to sign a counter letter against it, claiming that the Radio Free Europe spreads false information about the Soviet repressions in Poland, which in its own right was an obscene lie, wrote Norman Davies. Wyka was one of only two men who strategically withdrew their names from the original list to save their own jobs at the last moment. Ireneusz Opacki was among his doctoral students; and Janina Garycka was among his students. His daughter Marta Wyka became a literary critic and literary historian.

== Books ==
- Pogranicze powieści. Kraków. 1948. Reissued 1974, 1989.
- Cyprian Norwid, poeta i sztukmistrz. Kraków. 1948.
- Legenda i prawda "Wesela". Warszawa. 1950.
- "Teka Stańczyka" na tle historii Galicji w latach 1849–1869. Wrocław. 1951.
- Matejko i Słowacki. Warszawa. 1953.
- O formie prawdziwej "Pana Tadeusza". Warszawa. 1955.
- Szkice literackie i artystyczne. Vol. 1–2. Kraków. 1956.
- Życie na niby. Szkice z lat 1939–1945. Warszawa. 1957. Reissued 1959, 1985, 2010.
- Rzecz wyobraźni. Warszawa. 1959. Reissued 1977.
- Modernizm polski. Kraków. 1959. Reissued 1968.
- Duch poetów podsłuchane. Pastisze. Kraków. 1959. Reissued 1962.
- Krzysztof Baczyński 1921–1944. Kraków. 1961.
- Makowski. Kraków. 1963. Reissued 1973.
- Podróż do krainy nieprawdopodobieństwa. Kraków. 1964.
- Łowy na kryteria. Warszawa. 1965.
- Stara szuflada. Kraków. 1967. Second extended edition 2000.
- Norwid w Krakowie. Kraków. 1967.
- Aleksander Fredro. Warszawa. 1968. Reissued 1986.
- O potrzebie historii literatury. Szkice polonistyczne z lat 1944–1967. Warszawa. 1969.
- Wędrówki po tematach. Vol. 1–3. Kraków. 1971.
- Thanatos i Polska, czyli o Jacku Malczewskim. Kraków. 1971.
- Literatura polska. Przewodnik encyklopedyczny. Warszawa. 1985. Co-author.
- Pokolenia literackie. Kraków. 1977. Reissued 1989.
- Młoda Polska. Vol. 1–2. Kraków. 1977. Reissued 1987.
- Różewicz parokrotnie. Warszawa. 1977.
- Nowe i dawne wędrówki po tematach. Warszawa. 1978.
- Opowiadania. Kraków. 1978.
- Reymont, czyli Ucieczka do życia. Warszawa. 1979.
- Odeszli. Warszawa. 1983.
- List do Jana Bugaja. Droga do Baczyńskiego. Warszawa. 1986.
- Cyprian Norwid. Kraków. 1989.
- Baczyński i Różewicz. Kraków. 1994.
- Wyznania uduszonego. Kraków. 1995.
- Wśród poetów. Kraków. 2000.
- Tylnym pomostem. Felietony zebrane. Kraków. 2010.

== Commemoration ==
In 1980, the president (mayor) of Kraków established the commemorative Kazimierz Wyka Award in the field of literary criticism, essay, and history of literature. The award was given annually.
