= Markevičius =

- Lithuanian surname
- m.: Markevičius
- f.: (unmarried): Markevičiūtė
- f.: (married): Markevičienė

Markevičius is a Lithuanian-language surname, Lithuanized from the Slavic patronymic counterparts: Polish Markiewicz, Russian Markevich (Маркевич), and Belarusian Markievič (Маркевіч).

Notable people with the surname include:

- Kazys Markevičius (1905-1980), Lithuanian boxer
- Vytautas Markevičius, Lithuanian politician
- Gvidonas Markevičius (born 1969), Lithuanian basketball player
- Tadas Markevičius, Lithuanian football (soccer) player
- Marius A. Markevicius, American producer, director and writer

== See also ==
- Surnames derived from the name Mark
