= Ryszard Nycz =

Polish historian and theorist of literature (born 1951)

- Born: 9 December 1951 (age 74); Kraków
- Occupations: Historian of literature, theorist of literature

Ryszard Nycz (born 9 December 1951) is a historian and theorist of literature, member of Polish Academy of Sciences and Polish Academy of Arts and Sciences.

== Biography ==
The son of Mieczysław Nycz and Józefa née Chromy. In 1974 he graduated with master's degree in Polish studies from the Jagiellonian University. In 1983 he obtained doctorate in the humanities upon thesis Sylwy współczesne. Problem konstrukcji tekstu supervised by Janusz Sławiński.

He was employed at the Institute of Literary Research of the Polish Academy of Sciences.

== Books ==
- Sylwy współczesne. Problem konstrukcji tekstu. Warszawa. 1984. Second edition published in Kraków, 1996.
- Tekstowy świat. Poststrukturalizm a wiedza o literaturze. Warszawa. 1995. Second edition published in Kraków, 2000.
- Język modernizmu. Prolegomena historycznoliterackie. Wrocław. 1997. Following editions published in 2002, 2013. 3rd edition published by Wydawnictwo Naukowe Uniwersytetu Mikołaja Kopernika.
- Literatura jako trop rzeczywistości. Poetyka epifanii w nowoczesnej literaturze polskiej. Kraków. 2001.
- Poetyka doświadczenia. Teoria – nowoczesność – literatura. Warszawa. 2012.

== Accolades ==
- Gold Cross of Merit (1998)
- Medal of the Commission of National Education (2002)
- Prime Minister's Award for Outstanding Scientific Achievements (2003)
- Awards of the Rector of the Jagiellonian University (2003, 2013, 2018)
- Jagiellonian Laurel (2015)
- Silver Medal „Plus ratio Quam Vis” (2018)
- Knight's Cross of Polonia Restituta (2005)
- Gold Medal for Long Service (2018)
