= Zbigniew Uniłowski =

Polish writer (1909–1937)

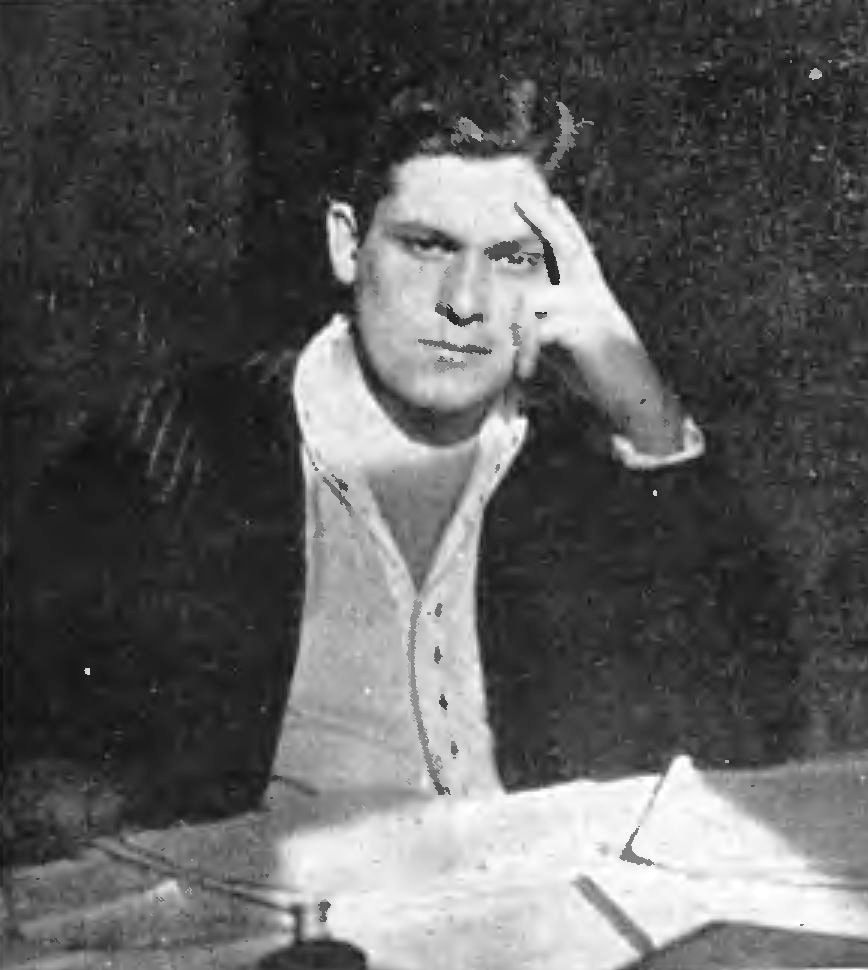
- Born: 1 May 1909 Warsaw, Poland
- Died: 12 November 1937 (aged 28) Warsaw

Zbigniew Uniłowski (born 1 May 1909 in Warsaw, Poland, died 12 November 1937 in Warsaw) was a Polish writer.

== Early years ==
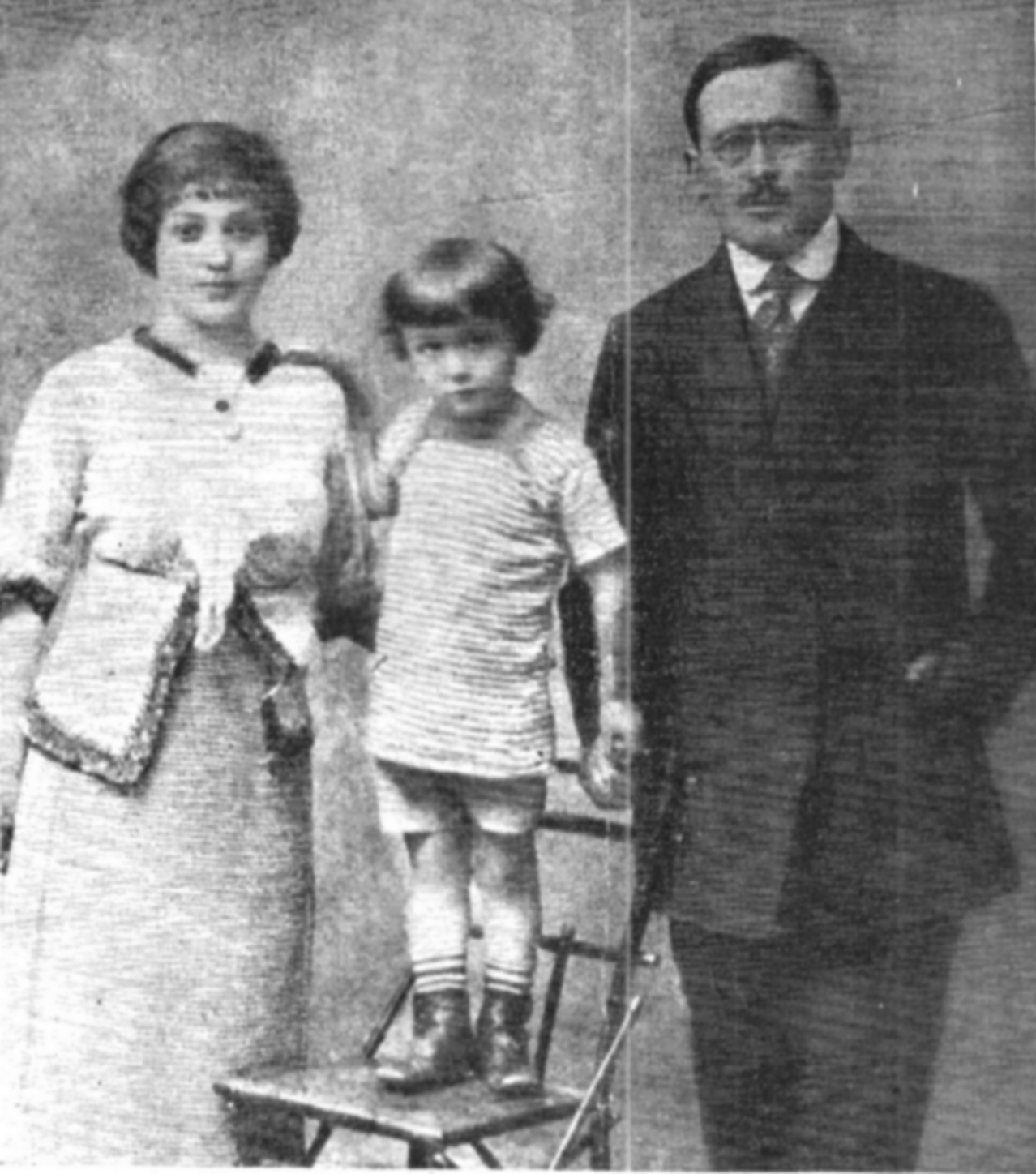
Uniłowski as a child with parents (1913)

Uniłowski was born in Warsaw in a petty-bourgeois family. His parents were Władysław Uniłowski and Jadwiga Uniłowska née Ciechonski. After the death of both parents (his mother died of tuberculosis, while father committed suicide), as a teenage boy, he lived with his aunt, a poor seamstress in Powiśle. Not completing junior high school for financial reasons, he was forced to take up employment, including as a bricklaying helper, a parcel delivery service for a tailor or a waiter boy in the Warsaw restaurant "Astoria". There, in 1926, Karol Szymanowski noticed him, being intrigued by the young waiter who read Joseph Conrad's prose. Szymanowski's financial assistance enabled Uniłowski to self-study, facilitated literary contacts, and above all, enabled him to stay frequently in Zakopane, which was advisable due to developing tuberculosis.

== Start of literary career ==
Uniłowski spent some time from 1927 to 1930 mainly in Zakopane, at times staying in Warsaw. During his stay in the Tatra Mountains, he wrote his first published works - short stories collected later in the book Człowiek w Oknie (Man in a window). He also began writing his opus magnum, an unfinished novel, Dwadzieścia lat życia (Twenty Years of Life). The stay in Zakopane also provided an opportunity to meet the personalities of contemporary literary life - Uniłowski met there, among others, Stanisław Ignacy Witkiewicz, Jarosław Iwaszkiewicz and Michał Choromański.

In 1930, he returned to Warsaw. He was mainly active in the environment of the poetic group Kwadryga, with whom he had worked for a year. He described this period in roman à clef Wspólny pokój (Shared Room), published in 1933. The publication of the novel became the basis of a social scandal in the Warsaw literary community, and the novel was requisitioned for censorship. However, intervention from the authorities and the considerable interest from literary critics gained significant attention for the young author.

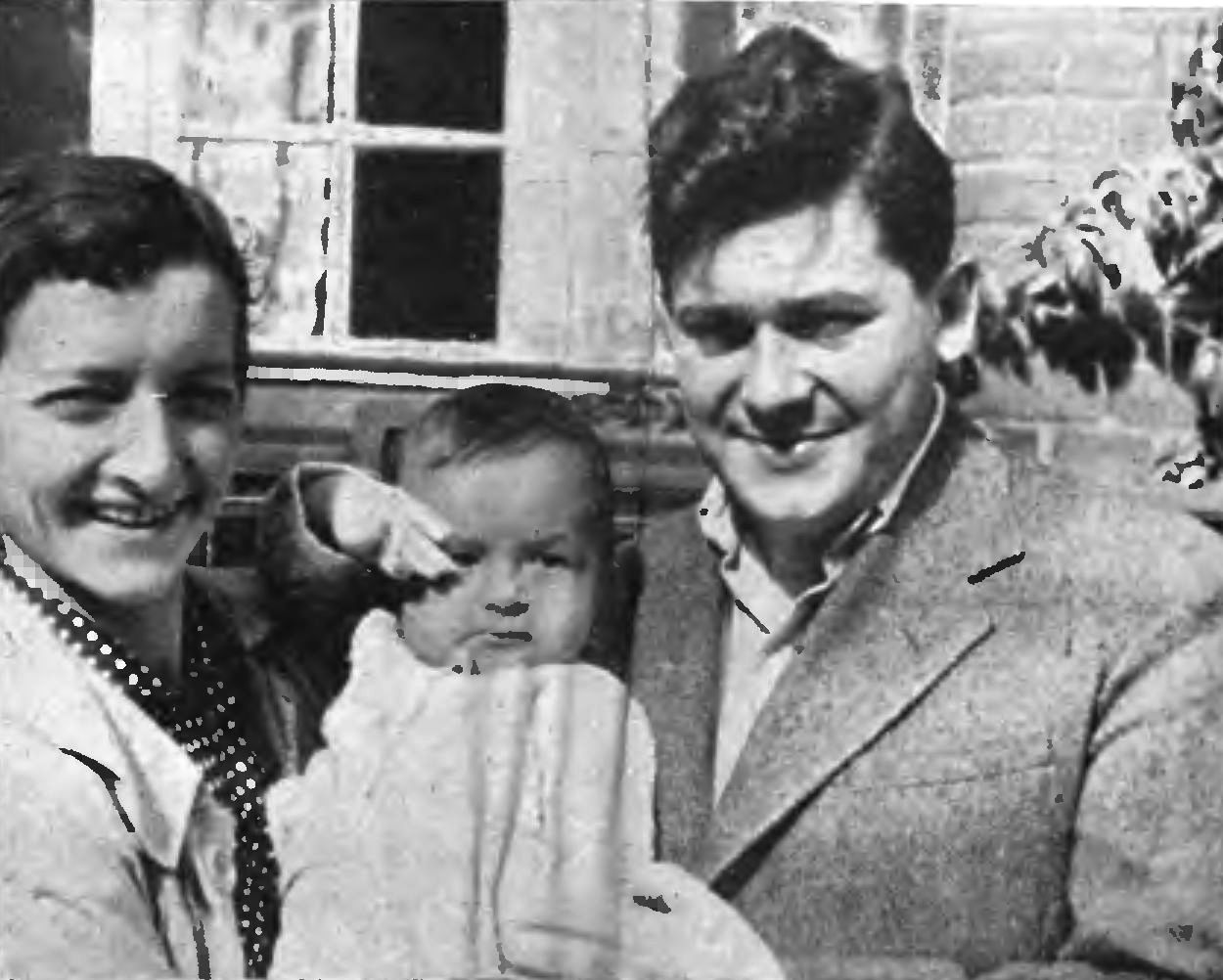
Uniłowski with wife and son (1937)

Uniłowski stayed in Warsaw until 1934, leaving for a short time in 1931, when he was called up for the military service in Włodawa. He didn't stay in the army for long, thanks to the influence of his protectors. The growing literary position enabled the writer to go to Brazil thanks to Ministry of Foreign Affairs stipend. During his stay there, he published Dzień rekruta (Recruit Day), a story based on his experiences from military service. This work caused another scandal, and the author was accused of anti-state attitude. As a result, he was forced to shorten his journey and return to Poland in July 1935, bringing with him two new novels - Żyto w dżungli (Rye in the Jungle) and Dziennik morski (Sea Diary).

== Marriage and death ==
In 1935, Zbigniew Uniłowski married Maria Lilpop, daughter of Franciszek Lilpop. Thanks to this marriage, the writer, who was constantly in a difficult financial situation, gained material and life stability. Two years later their son was born. At that time, Uniłowski intensively worked on Dwadzieścia lat życia (Twenty Years of Life), the first part of which was published in 1937.

He died unexpectedly from meningitis at the age of 28, not having finished Dwadzieścia lat życia. He was buried at the Powązki Cemetery.

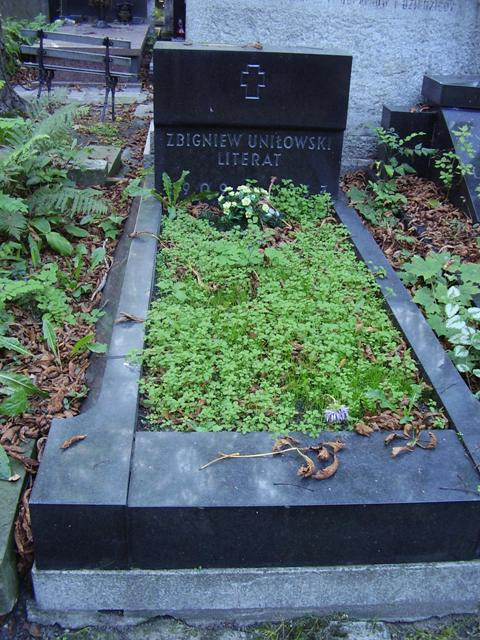
Unilowski's grave at Powązki Cemetery

== Works ==
- Wspólny pokój (Warszawa 1932)
- Człowiek w oknie (Warszawa 1933)
- Dzień rekruta ("Wiadomości Literackie" nr 46, 1934)
- Żyto w dżungli (Warszawa 1936)
- Pamiętnik morski (Warszawa 1937)
- Dwadzieścia lat życia, t. 1 (Warszawa 1937)

== Bibliography ==
- Faron, Bolesław (1969). Zbigniew Uniłowski. Kraków: Państwowe Wydawnictwo Naukowe.
- Bolesław Faron: Wstęp [in:] Zbigniew Uniłowski: Wspólny pokój i inne utwory. Wrocław 1976.
- Wiadomości Literackie 5 XII 1937 nr 50 (736). Special issue of Wiadomości Literackie about Zbigniewo Uniłowski.
