= Markevich =

Markevich, also Markevych, Markevitch, Markievich, etc. is an East Slavic surname literally meaning "son of Mark". The Polish-language versions are Markiewicz/Markiewicz. Notable people with the surname include:

- Aleksandr Markevich
- Boleslav Markevich, (1822 – 1884), Polish-Russian writer, essayist, journalist, and literary critic
- Dimitry Markevitch (1923–2002), Ukrainian concert cellist, researcher, teacher, and musicologist
- Igor Markevitch (1912 – 1983), avant-garde composer and conductor of Russian origin, naturalized French and Italian
- Leonid Markevich
- Matrona Markevich, designer of the ornament on the flag of Belarus
- Mykola Markevych
- Myron Markevych
- Ostap Markevych, Ukrainian footballer, futsal player and football coach

== See also ==
- Surnames derived from the name Mark
