= Michał Głowiński =

Polish philologist, historian and literary theorist (1934–2023)

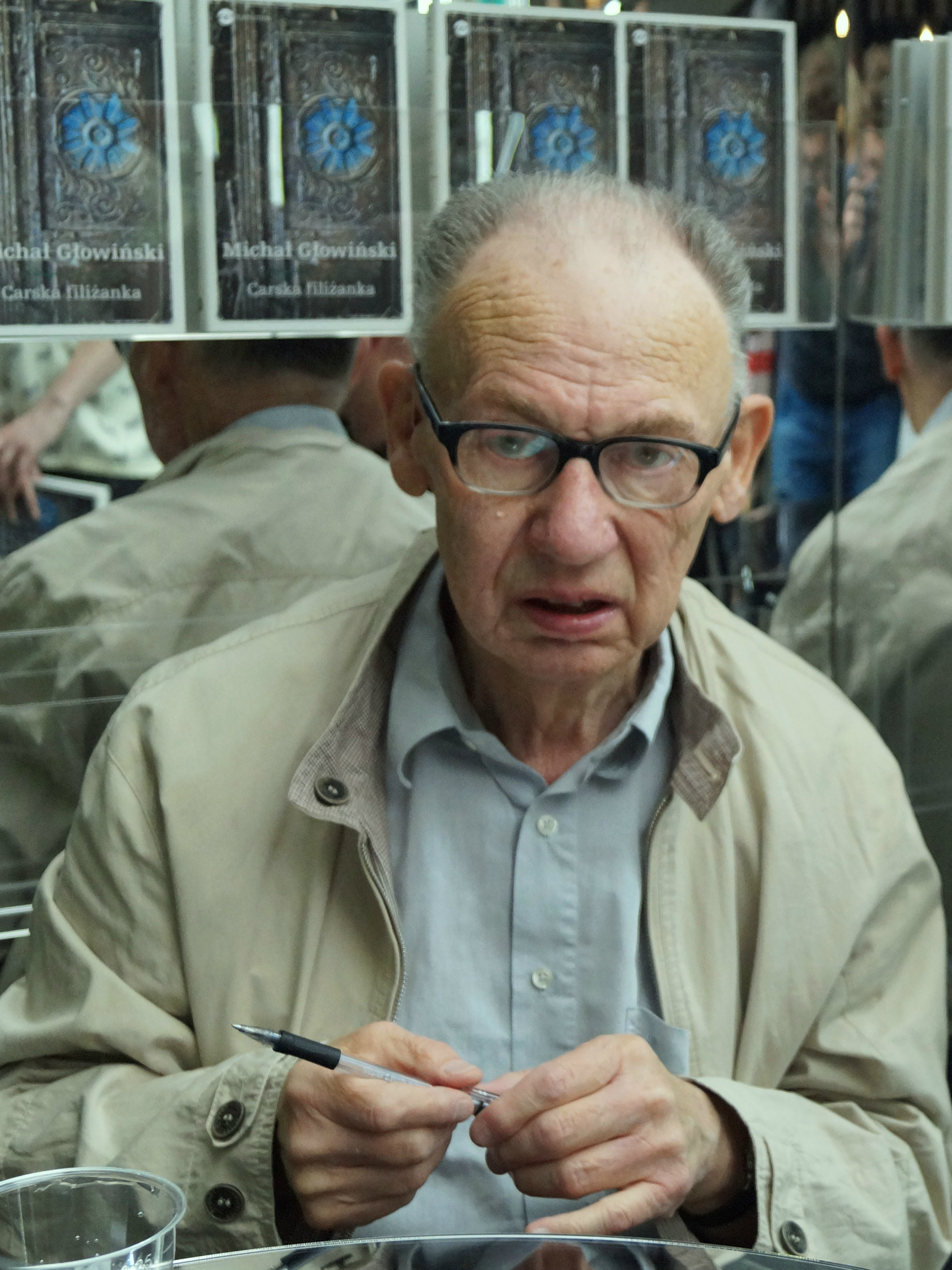
- Głowiński in 2016
- Born: 4 November 1934; Warsaw, Poland
- Died: 29 September 2023 (aged 88); Warsaw, Poland
- Citizenship: Polish
- Education: University of Warsaw
- Occupation: Writer
- Writing career
- Genres: History and literary theory specializing in the recent history of Polish literature
- Notable work: Black Seasons Ulysses' Day Circles of Strangeness.
- Notable awards: Order of Polonia Restituta, Medal for Merit to Culture – Gloria Artis

Michał Głowiński (4 November 1934 – 29 September 2023) was a Polish philologist, historian and literary theorist specializing in the history of Polish literature. Głowiński was a professor of humanities and member of the Polish Academy of Sciences and the Polish Academy of Arts and Sciences. Głowiński was a professor at the Institute of Literary Research of the Polish Academy of Sciences and a Member of the Collegium Invisibile.

Głowiński wrote about 30 books on Polish studies. The most famous include, Order, Chaos, Meaning (1968), The Young-Polish Novel (1969), Black Seasons (Czarne sezony) (1998) and Rings of Alienation. Głowiński wrote extensively on the language of Communist propaganda and his experience as a young Jewish boy in the WW2 Polish Ghettos.

== Early life ==
Michał Głowiński was born in Warsaw on 4 November 1934. At the beginning of the Second World War, Głowiński and his family were placed in the ghetto in Pruszków and later transferred to the Warsaw Ghetto. Głowiński was taken to the Warsaw ghetto in 1939, at five years old. Głowiński was saved from the Warsaw Ghetto by Irena Sendler and placed in the care facility of the Congregation of the Blessed Virgin Mary's Servants in Turkowice. In his memoirs, Black Seasons, Głowiński devoted four chapters to the orphanage in Turkowice, where the cruelty of some children towards him is contrasted with the goodness of others. Głowiński and his parents stayed there until July 1942, when the Nazis ordered the liquidation of the ghetto. Half a million Jewish residents of the ghetto were taken to Umschlagplatz and from there to the Treblinka gas chambers. After initially hiding in a cellar, Głowiński and his parents were identified and selected for Treblinka. They were saved, though, thanks to a Jewish police officer, whom his father knew, and who helped them escape to Warsaw.

== After the war ==
Głowiński studied Polish studies at the University of Warsaw after the war and graduated with a master's degree in 1955. In 1954, Głowiński debuted with a study of Adolf Rudnicki's "Manfred." Głowiński was a scholarship holder at the Department of Theory of Literature under Kazimierz Budzyk from 1955 to 1958. At the same time, Głowiński started to engage in critical practice, especially reviewing poetry collections in publications such as "Życie Literackie" and "Twórczoci. "

From 1958, Głowiński worked at the Polish Academy of Sciences' Institute of Literary Study. Graduating in 1967 with a dissertation titled "A collection of studies in the history and theory of the Polish novel." Głowiński earned the academic title of professor in 1976.

Głowiński joined the Scientific Courses Society as a founding member in 1978. On 20 August 1980, Głowiński signed a letter to the communist authorities signed by 64 academics, authors, and journalists urging them to dialogue with the striking workers. Głowiński was promoted to full professor in 1986.

In 1999 Głowiński spoke about Polish academia under communism. Głowiński said that authorities looked more about his knowledge of Marxism rather than literacy. Głowiński recalled his disappointment with the scientific level of his lectures, often on Marxism rather than literature, and the beginnings of his fascination with linguistics.

Głowiński chaired the institute's Scientific Council since 1990. Głowiński was a member of the Polish Authors Association and the Warsaw Scientific Society.

Głowiński published an autobiographical novel, named "Circles of Strangeness" in 2010. This book also was his public coming out as gay.

Michał Głowiński died on 29 September 2023, at the age of 88.

== Awards and distinctions ==
Głowiński had four honorary degrees. In 2002, Głowiński was honored with the Kazimierz Wyka Award. In 2004, Głowiński was awarded by the Alfred Toepfer Foundation in Hamburg. In January 2007, Głowiński was awarded the gold medal for Merit to Culture - Gloria Artis. In 2008, Głowiński became a laureate of the literary award of the Polish PEN Club, with the Jan Parandowski prize. On 8 March 2013, for outstanding services in researching, documenting and commemorating the history of March '68, Głowiński was decorated with the Officer's Cross of the Order of Polonia Restituta.

Głowiński was nominated four times for the Nike Literary Award: in 1997 for Speech in a state of siege, in 1999 for Black Seasons, in 2001 for Ulysses' Day and other sketches on non-mythological topics, and in 2011 for Circles of Strangeness. On 11 December 2016, Głowiński received the Lodz Literary Award. Julian Tuwim, awarded to him for "not only literary but also ethical standards" and "commitment to the world's affairs."

== Publications ==
- Tuwim's poetics and the Polish literary tradition (1962)
- Order, Chaos, Meaning (1968)
- Young Poland novel (1969)
- Novel Games (1973)
- Pickup Styles (1977)
- Newspeak in Polish (1990)
- Disguised Myths (1990)
- March talk. Comments on words. 1966-1971 (1991)
- Ritual and demagogy. Thirteen Sketches on Degraded Art (1992)
- Poetics and surroundings (1992)
- Peereliade. Comments on words. 1976-1981 (1993)
- Speech under siege. 1982-1985 (1996)
- The Underworld Presented: Sketches on the Poetry of Bolesław Leśmian (1998)
- Black Seasons (1998)
- The Ending (1999)
- Ulysses Day and Other Sketches on Non-mythological Subjects (2000)
- Magdalenka made of wholemeal bread (2001, novel)
- Gombrowicz and super-literature (2002)
- The History of One Poplar (2003)
- Wings and Heel (2004)
- Irony (2005)
- Footbridge over time (2006)
- Telimena's internal monologue and other sketches (2007)
- Plots discontinued. Little Sketches 1998–2007 (2008)
- The circles of alienation. An Autobiographical Tale (2010)
- Tsarist cup. Sixteen Stories (2016)
