= Ryszard Markiewicz =

Jurist and legal advisor

- Occupations: Jurist, legal advisor
- Employer: Jagiellonian University
- Parent(s): Henryk Markiewicz, Maria née Milberger

Academic background
- Education: Jagiellonian University
- Doctoral advisor: Andrzej Kopff

Ryszard Markiewicz is a jurist and legal advisor specializing in copyright, who was professor at the Jagiellonian University.

== Biography ==
He was born as the son of Henryk Markiewicz and Maria née Milberger, brother of Adam. He passed matura in the Jan Kochanowski High School in Kraków. In 1969 he graduated in law from the Jagiellonian University. In 1976 he obtained doctorate, also from the Jagiellonian University, upon dissertation supervised by Andrzej Kopff. In 1984 he obtained habilitation. From 1972 to 2024 he worked at the Jagiellonian University. From 2015 to 2019 he was a member of the Komitet Nauk Prawnych Polskiej Akademii Nauk. He supervised eight doctoral dissertations; his doctoral students included Agnieszka Vetulani-Cęgiel. He was a member of the editorial board of the journal Kwartalnika Prawa Prywatnego. His scientific collaborator for several years was Janusz Barta.

He declared himself non-believer. His son Michał was born in 1987. Michał Markiewicz holds a doctorate in law, serves as an assistant professor at the Jagiellonian University, and is a partner at Markiewicz & Sroczyński, the law firm co-founded by Ryszard Markiewicz.

== Works ==
- Umowy licencyjne między jednostkami gospodarki uspołecznionej. Warszawa, Kraków: Państwowe Wydawnictwo Naukowe. 1978.
- Dzieło literackie i jego twórca w polskim prawie autorskim. Uniwersytet Jagielloński. 1984.
- Ochrona prac naukowych. Państwowe Wydawnictwo Naukowe. 1990.
- Główne problemy prawa komputerowego. Warszawa: Wydawnictwa Naukowo-Techniczne. 1993. Co-authored with Janusz Barta.
- Komentarz do ustawy o prawie autorskim i prawach prokrewnych. 1995. 2001. Co-authored with Janusz Barta, Zbigniew Ćwiąkalski, Monika Czajkowska-Dąbrowska, Elżbieta Traple
- Prawo autorskie w Światowej Organizacji Handlu. Towarzystwo Autorów i Wydawców Prac Naukowych Universitas. 1996. Co-authored with Janusz Barta.
- Prawo autorskie. Przepisy, orzecznictwo, umowy międzynarodowe. 1997.
- Internet a prawo. 1998. Co-authored with Janusz Barta.
- Prawo autorskie. 1998. Co-authored with Janusz Barta.
- Prawo autorskie, Przepisy. Orzecznictwo. Umowy międzynarodowe. Wydawnictwo ABC. 1999. Co-authored with Janusz Barta.
- Ochrona danych osobowych. Komentarz. Kraków. 2001. 2015. Co-authored with Janusz Barta.
- Oprogramowanie open source w świetle prawa: między własnością a wolnością. Kraków: Kantor Wydawniczy Zakamycze. 2005. ISBN 978-83-7444-092-9.
- Zabawy prawem autorskim. Warszawa: Wolters Kluwer. 2015. ISBN 978-83-264-7976-2.
- Ilustrowane prawo autorskie. Warszawa: Wolters Kluwer. 2018. ISBN 978-83-8160-036-1.
- Prawo autorskie: komentarz do wybranego orzecznictwa Trybunału Sprawiedliwości UE. Warszawa: Wolters Kluwer. 2019. ISBN 978-83-8160-350-8. Co-authored with Ewa Laskowska-Litak.
- Zabawy z prawem autorskim dawne i nowe. Warszawa: Wolters Kluwer. 2022. ISBN 978-83-8286-720-6.
- Zasada proporcjonalności w prawie autorskim w Unii Europejskiej. Warszawa: Wolters Kluwer. 2023. ISBN 978-83-8328-935-9.
- Prawo autorskie i prawa pokrewne: wprowadzenie. Wolters Kluwer. 2024. ISBN 978-83-8390-056-8. Co-authored with Janusz Barta.
- Utwór i twórca w prawie autorskim: zilustrowane wątpliwości. Wolters Kluwer Polska. 2026. ISBN 978-83-8438-167-0.

=== Edition ===
- Qui bene dubitat, bene sciet: księga jubileuszowa dedykowana Profesor Ewie Nowińskiej. Warszawa: Wolters Kluwer. 2018. ISBN 978-83-8124-412-1. Co-edited with Janusz Barta, Jakub Chwalba and Piotr Wasilewski.

== Awards ==
- Gold Cross of Merit (1998)
- Knight's Cross of the Order of Polonia Restituta (2003)
