= Moritz Loth =

Moravian-born Jewish-American businessman

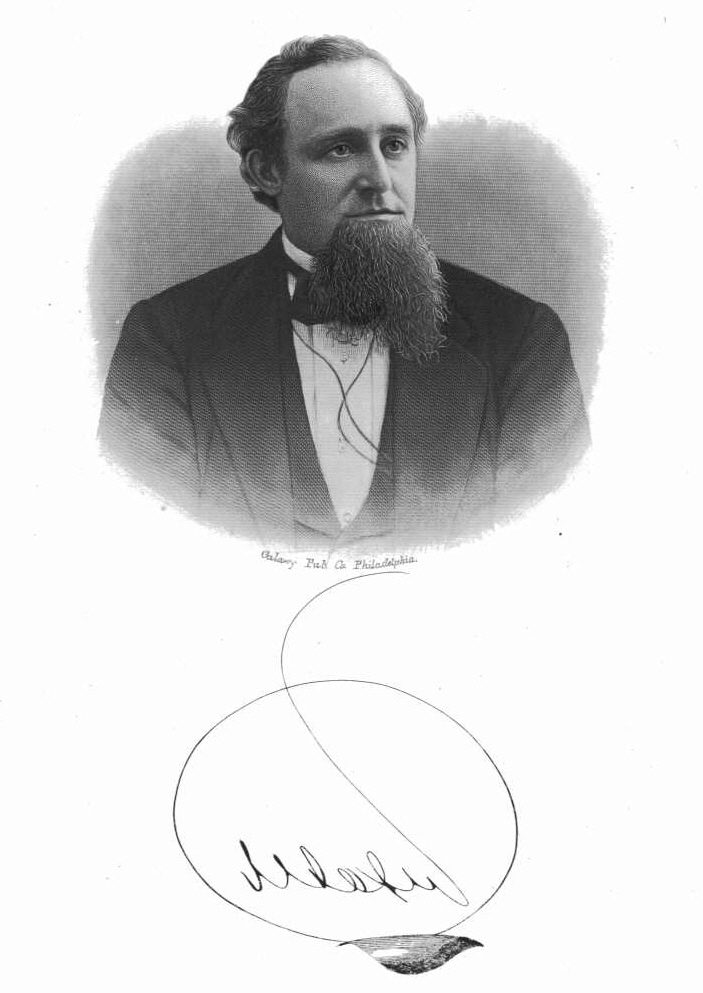
Portrait of Moritz Loth from 1870

Moritz Loth (29 December 1832 – 18 February 1913) was a Moravian-born Jewish-American businessman and an early leader of Reform Judaism.

== Life ==
Loth was born on 29 December 1832, in Milotice, Moravia, the son of Bernard Loth and Pauline Strassman.

Loth's father died when he was nine. He moved to Pest, Hungary in 1842, where his brother Joseph got him a job at a lace and ribbon establishment and studied in the evenings. He fought in the Hungarian Revolution of 1848, and following the Revolution's defeat in 1849 Joseph immigrated to America and promised to get his brother a ticket to America. Loth was told to Berlin shortly afterwards, where a letter with a ticket was waiting for him. He didn't have a passport to get to Berlin, but he was able to make the hazardous journey via recommendations from the Pest Republican Revolutionary Club. He didn't find the ticket in Berlin, and after weeks of waiting he went to Hamburg in the hope to work his way to America on a vessel. However, the Austrian army was in Hamburg due to the situation in Schleswig-Holstein and strangers were being checked for passports, although he was able to live in the home of a Hamburg Revolutionary Club member. In 1851, when Austrian soldiers was sent to the house to find papers belonging to an agent of Lajos Kossuth quartered at the same house, he successfully hid the papers from the soldiers. This led the Hamburg Revolutionary Club to smuggle him to London in a water-cask and give the papers to Kossuth. Kossuth left the day after he arrived in London, so he gave the papers to Baron Kemeny, president of the Hungarian Revolutionary Club in London. The Baron was going to send him to America as a reward, but the Baron's death a few weeks later prevented that and led him to work in a cap factory on Regent Street instead. He planned to join the revolutionary party in Paris during the 1851 French coup d'état, but he abandoned the plan when Napoleon III overthrew the Republic. Shortly afterwards, he accepted an offer from Lord Dudley Stuart, who on behalf of Napoleon and Franz Joseph I of Austria gave free passage and four pounds to any revolutionary republicans who would emigrate to America. He landed in New York City, New York in May 1852.

Loth settled in Hartford, Connecticut, where he opened a dry goods store and speculated in local bank currency. He then moved to Cincinnati, Ohio in 1858. By then a wealthy man, he opened a new store there and became a lobbyist for tax concessions beneficial for Cincinnati tradesmen. He was a founder of the Board of Trade, which later became the Cincinnati Southern Railroad, and general manager for the Central, Western, and Southern departments of the United States Credit System Company of New York. He drafted the Free Port of Entry bill, which made every interior city equal to a seaport, and he helped secure its passage through Congress with an editorial-writing campaign. As a member of the Board of Trade's Committee on Transportation he helped abolish the Portland Canal toll, and as a member of the Board's Committee on Public Improvement he inaugurated the Cincinnati Zoological Gardens. A street was named in his honor due to his work with the Board of Trade. He wrote novels and short stories, was editor and publisher of Monitor Magazine for children, and used funds raised as editor of-in-chief of the Fair Journal to rebuild the Cincinnati Union Bethel Building.

Loth was a devoted follower of Rabbi Isaac Mayer Wise. In 1872, as president of the Plum Street Temple, he recommended a committee be appointed to meet with committees from other congregations in order to form a union. This led to the formation of the Union of American Hebrew Congregations. He served as its first president from 1873 to 1889, after which he served on its executive board until his death. He was active in establishing the Hebrew Union College, which was founded in 1875. The classes were initially held in the Plum Street Temple, and he helped raise funds for the College's first building, which was dedicated in 1881. He personally collected over $50,000 for the creation of the College, its original endowment, and gave a lot of valuable books to its library. He founded the Ladies' Educational Aid Society to assist poor students at the College.

In 1860, Loth married Fredericka Wilhartz of New York City. Their children were Laura Newburgh, Ida Jacobs, Paul, Mrs. Leo Newburgh, and Steven.

Loth died at home on 18 February 1913. Rabbi Louis Grossmann of the Plum Street Temple conducted his funeral service in the chapel at the United Jewish Cemetery at Walnut Hills, where he was buried.
