= Tadeusz Markiewicz =

Polish sculptor, painter and graphic designer

Tadeusz Markiewicz (born 1936) is a Polish sculptor, painter and graphic designer, born October 27, 1936, in Jeziorko, Poland.

== Biography ==
Tadeusz Markiewicz, was born on May 28, 1936, in the Jeziorko region of Kielce. Kielce neighbors a virgin forest of fir that exercised an influence on his art. He studied at the School of Plastic Arts in Kielce, the Pedagogical School in Łódź and at the Academy of Fine Arts in Warsaw, Faculty of Sculpture where he studied under the renowned professor Franciszek Strynkiewicz. He graduated in 1965 with honors. Since that time, he has been a member of the Union of Polish Artists and Designers in Warsaw where he participated in its artistic life, receiving numerous recognitions for showing at exhibitions in Poland and abroad. He married Ewa Solonowicz on December 4, 1966, and had one son, Konrad (b. 1970). They divorced in 1973. Markiewicz has since remarried and has two children with his second wife. He currently lives and works in Warsaw, Poland.

== Professional Achievements ==
Between the years of 1966–97 Markiewicz won numerous prizes among which were: 1966 – The Minister of Culture and Art awarded him a medal and scholarship at the All-Poland Exhibition of Young Sculptors, Cracow.

1967 – Awarded honorable mention in the competition for the monument: Majdanek.

1967 – Awarded honorable mention in the competition for the monument: To the Heroes of the Pomerian Bulwark.

1968 – Awarded honorable mention at the competition for the monument to Janusz Kusocinski.

1969 – Awarded Second Prize in the Minister of Culture and Art competition for the sculpture: Warsaw Autumn.

1969 – Awarded Honorable Mention at the International Competition for the Monument to Chan Asparucha in Sofia, Bulgaria.

1970 – Honorable Mention for the design of the monument to W.I. Lenin at Nowa Huta.

1970 – Honorable Mention for the All-Poland Medalist's Competition devoted to the 100th anniversary of the October Revolution Leader. 1971 – Awarded Second Prize at the competition: Man, Work, and Environment for his sculpture, Our Teacher.

1972 – Awarded a bronze medal, Warsaw Festival of Fine Arts for the sculpture, Victorians.

1973 – Mine Thrower shown at Madrid, Spain during the International Art Exhibition connected with the Olympic Games.

1974: Silver Medal, Warsaw Festival of Fine Arts

1977: First Prize in the Polish National Plener

1979: Minister of Culture and Art award

1981: Second Prize, Warsaw Festival of Fine Arts

1982: Prize in the International Biennale in Madrid, Spain

1987: Gold Medal, Winter Salon of Sculpture

1988: Grand Prix, Winter Salon of Sculpture

1989: Minister of Culture and Art award

1990: Silver Medal, Winter Salon of Sculpture

1991: Gold Medal, Winter Salon of Sculpture

1993: Silver Medal, Winter Salon of Sculpture

1995: Grand Prix, Winter Salon of Sculpture

2003: Lifetime Achievement Award given by the Polish Association of Artists and Sculptors

He created the Golden Duck (equivalent to the American Oscar) awarded to individuals for outstanding accomplishments in area of Polish Cinematography. Throughout his career, he has participated in more than 100 exhibits in Poland, and abroad such as Paris, Venice and Budapest. His works are in the collections of many Polish museums as well as Paris, Lausanne, New York, Madrid and the Vatican. It was at the Vatican where, on November 4, 2003, Markiewicz personally presented the gold-plated sculpture Angels over the Pyramid to Pope John Paul II as a gift to commemorate the 25th anniversary of his papacy. In 2009, Markiewicz was creating monuments to the memory of Pope John Paul II and Cardinal Stefan Wyszynski. In addition, he was honoring the prominent Polish writer and poet Antoni Slonimski by designing a monument to him.

Among many winning prizes for designing monuments, several of them are most prominent. They include the monument to Jan Kiepura in town of Sosnowiec, Poland and in Krynica, Poland (replica), the monument to the National Army (Polish Army Resistance) in the town of Sopot, the monument to the Polish Mother in Łódź, Poland, and a memorial to Polish Soldiers who died in Lenino (Soviet Union), in Warsaw, Poland.

=== Annotated Bibliography ===
- Ksawery Piwocki, "Tadeusz Markiewicz." In Sculpture and Paintings: Unpublished Exhibit Program for the Zwiazek Polskich Artystow Plastykow Exhibit held in Warsaw, Poland 1973, edited by Waldemar Solonowicz.
- Eva Powers, Personal recollection, December 2009.
- Waldemar Solonowicz. “Tadeusz Markiewicz.” In Sculpture and Paintings: Unpublished Exhibit Program for the Zwiazek Polskich Artystow Plastykow Exhibit held in Warsaw, Poland 1973, edited by Waldemar Solonowicz.
- Wieslawa Zielinska. “Tadeusz Markiewicz.” In Sculpture and Paintings: Unpublished Exhibit
