= Henryk Markiewicz =

Polish literary historian (1922–2013)

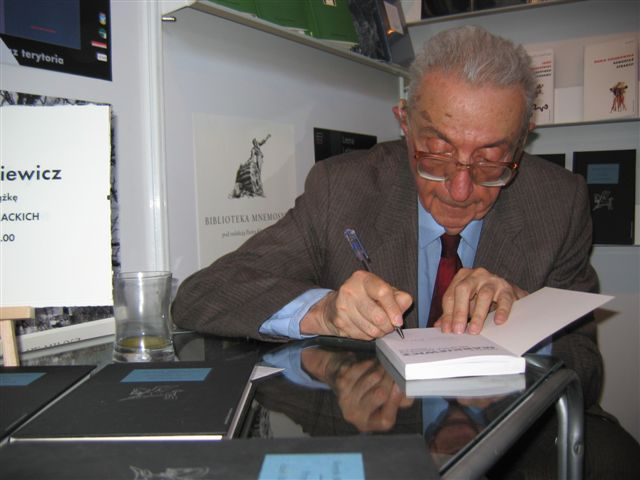
- Henryk Markiewicz
- Born: 16 November 1922; Kraków
- Died: 31 October 2013 (aged 90); Kraków
- Education: Jagiellonian University
- Children: Ryszard, Adam
- Scientific career
- Fields: history of literature

Henryk Markiewicz (16 November 1922 – 31 October 2013) was a Polish historian, specializing in the history and theory of literature, with the particular focus on the Polish literature of 1864-1939. He was a professor emeritus of the Jagiellonian University, where he was a director of the Institute of Polish Philology. He was a member of the Polish Academy of Sciences and the Polish Academy of Learning. He has been one of the editors of the Polski Słownik Biograficzny, and its editor-in-chief from 1991 until 2002, as well as editor of several other historical book series. He has published a number of books and articles.

He was a member of Polish United Workers' Party. Marta Wyka was among his doctoral students. He had sons Ryszard and Adam.

== Books ==
- O marksistowskiej teorii literatury. 1952.
- Prus i Żeromski. 1954. Reprint 1964.
- Tradycje i rewizje. 1957.
- Główne problemy wiedzy o literaturze. 1965.
- Sztuka interpretacji. 1971.
- Przekroje i zbliżenia dawne i nowe. 1976.
- Pozytywizm. 1978. Reprint 1999.
- Polska nauka o literaturze. 1981.
- Wymiary dzieła literackiego. 1984.
- Świadomość literatury. 1985.
- Literatura pozytywizmu. 1986.
- Literaturoznawstwo i jego sąsiedztwa. 1989.
- Teoria powieści za granicą. 1995.
- Polskie teorie powieści. 1998.

== Awards ==
=== Distinctions ===
- Gold Cross of Merit (1953)
- Medal of the 10th Anniversary of People's Poland (1955)
- Knight's Cross of the Order of Polonia Restituta (1954)
- Officer's Cross of the Order of Polonia Restituta (1964)
- Medal of the Commission of National Education (1979)
- Commander's Cross of the Order of Polonia Restituta (1983)
- Commander's Cross with Star of the Order of Polonia Restituta (22 May 2000)
- Medal of Pushkin (2001)
- Gold Gloria Artis Medal for Merit to Culture (5 January 2007)

=== Accolades ===
- Kraków Book of the Month Award for Boy Żeleński (June 2001)
