= Alicja Szałagan =

Polish literary historian (born 1950)

- Born: 1950 (age 75–76)
- Occupation: Historian

Academic background
- Education: IBL PAN
- Thesis: (1985)

Academic work
- Discipline: History
- Sub-discipline: History of literature
- Website: Alicja Szałagan publications on Academia.edu

Alicja Szałagan (born 1950) is a literary historian.

== Biography ==
In 1973 Szałagan graduated with a master's degree in Polish studies from the University of Warsaw. In 1985 she obtained doctorate at the Institute of Literary Research of the Polish Academy of Sciences (IBL PAN).

Szałagan worked at the IBL PAN, at the Pracownia Dokumentacji Literatury Współczesnej (transl. Contemporary Literature Documentation Laboratory), from 1973 until 2024 and edited, among others, the online dictionary Polscy pisarze i badacze literatury XX i XXI wieku (transl. Polish Writers and Literary Scholars of the 20th and 21st centuries). Her research interests included history of literature, documentation of literature, biography of the 20th–21st centuries, bibliography of Polish literature of the 20th–21st centuries.

== Books ==
- Polska literatura i kultura literacka w latach II wojny światowej. Bibliografia przedmiotowa 1945–1985. Wrocław: Wiedza o Kulturze. 1992.
- Maria Kuncewiczowa. Monografia dokumentacyjna 1895–1989. Warszawa. 1995.
- Józef Czapski w wydawnictwach Instytutu Literackiego w Paryżu. Bibliografia. Warszawa: Konstelacja "Kultury". 2007.
- Witold Gombrowicz w wydawnictwach Instytutu Literackiego w Paryżu. Bibliografia. Warszawa: Konstelacja "Kultury". 2007.
- Maria Kuncewiczowa – przybliżenia. Szkice biograficzne. Warszawa: Wydawnictwo IBL PAN. 2015.

== Bibliography ==
- "Alicja Szałagan". Autorzy bibliografii w Instytucie Badań Literackich PAN. Warszawa. 2010.
