= Institute of Literary Research of the Polish Academy of Sciences =

Scientific institute based in Warsaw established in 1948

- Instytut Badań Literackich Polskiej Akademii Nauk
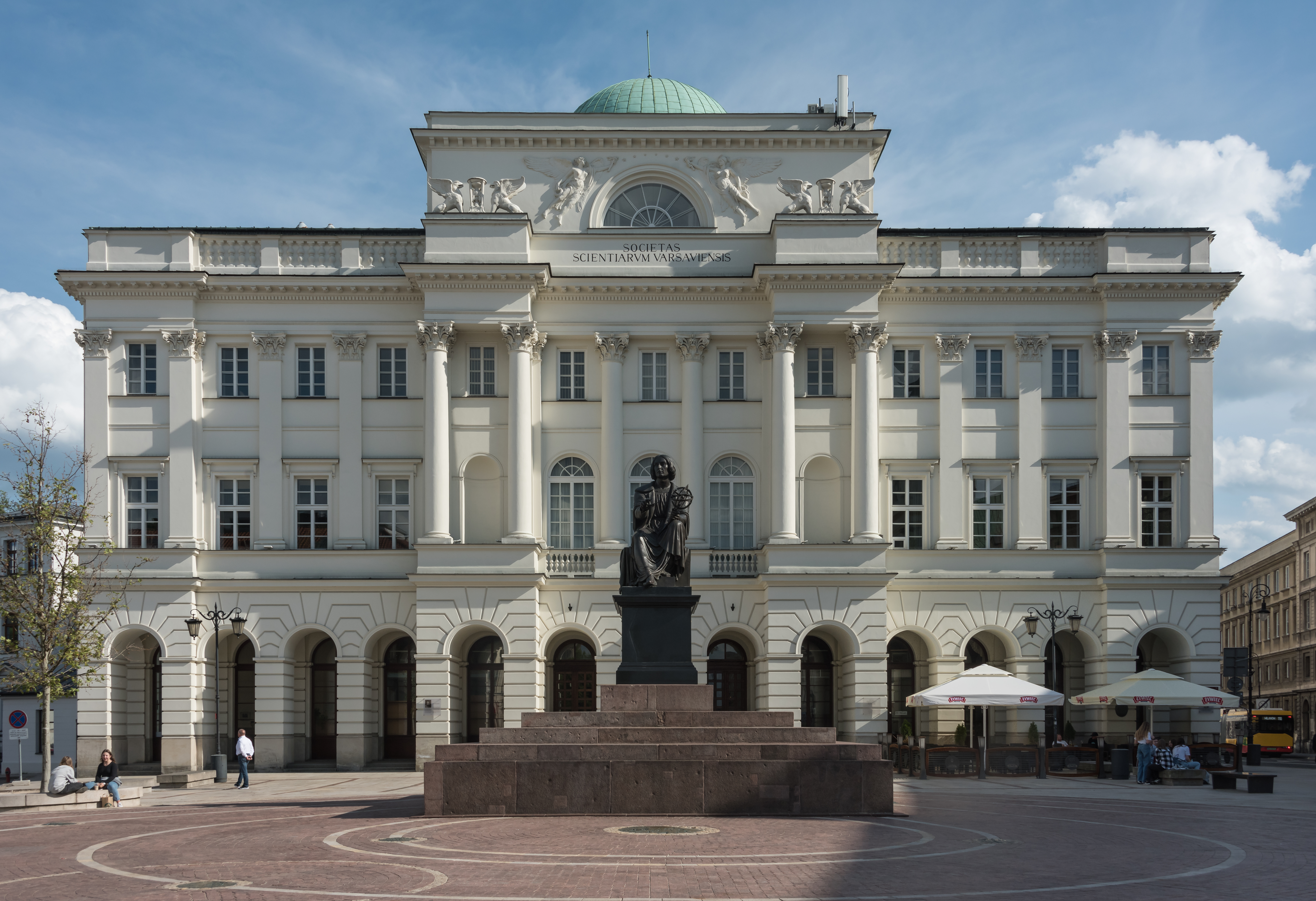
- Staszic Palace, where the institute is located
- Type: Scientific
- Established: 1948
- Location: 72 New World Street; 00-330, Warsaw, Poland
- Website: ibl.waw.pl/en

Institute of Literary Research of the Polish Academy of Sciences (Polish: Instytut Badań Literackich Polskiej Akademii Nauk; IBL PAN) is a scientific institute of the Polish Academy of Sciences based in the Staszic Palace in Warsaw, established on 24 July 1948.

The IBL PAN carries out documentation and editorial projects including on the Polska Bibliografia Literack (transl. Polish Literary Bibliography), Słownik Polszczyzny XVI wieku (transl. Dictionary of the 16th Century Polish Language), Słownik Współczesnych Pisarzy i Badaczy Literatury (transl. Dictionary of Contemporary Writers and Literary Researchers), Biblioteka Pisarzy Staropolskich (transl. Library of Old Polish Writers) and the Biblioteka Pisarzy Polskiego Oświecenia (transl. Library of Writers of the Polish Enlightenment), as well as editions of the writings of Jan Kochanowski, Gustaw Herling-Grudziński, and Eliza Orzeszkowa.

The IBL PAN runs a library, which has manuscripts of Cyprian Kamil Norwid, Eliza Orzeszkowa, Maria Konopnicka, Jan Kasprowicz, Witold Gombrowicz and Czesław Miłosz, and an archive.

The Department of Contemporary Literature Documentation of the IBL PAN issued an online biographical dictionary, Polish Writers and Literary Scholars of the 20th and 21st centuries.

Grzegorz Marzec has been serving as IBL PAN's director since 1 April 2022.

== Researchers ==
- Jadwiga Czachowska
- Beata Dorosz
- Ewa Głębicka
- Michał Głowiński
- Maria Janion
- Roman Loth
- Paweł Mościcki
- Ryszard Nycz
- Alicja Szałagan
