= Pedagogical University of Kraków =

University in Kraków, Poland

Coordinates: 50°4′24.46″N 19°54′31.54″E

University of the National Education Commission
- Uniwersytet Komisji Edukacji Narodowej w Krakowie
- Latin: Universitas Commissionis Educationis Nationis Polonorum Cracoviensis
- Type: Public
- Established: 1946
- Rector: prof. dr hab. Piotr Borek
- Students: 17,202 (12.2023)
- Location: ul. Podchorążych 2, 30-084 Kraków, Kraków, Poland
- Campus: Urban
- Website: www.uken.krakow.pl/en/

The University of the National Education Commission (Polish: Uniwersytet Komisji Edukacji Narodowej w Krakowie, UKEN), is named after the Commission of National Education created by King Stanisław August Poniatowski. It is a public university located in Kraków, Poland. It was founded soon after the conclusion of World War II, on 11 May 1946, originally as the National Higher College of Teacher Training. Its aim is the training of highly qualified teaching staff for the Polish educational system.

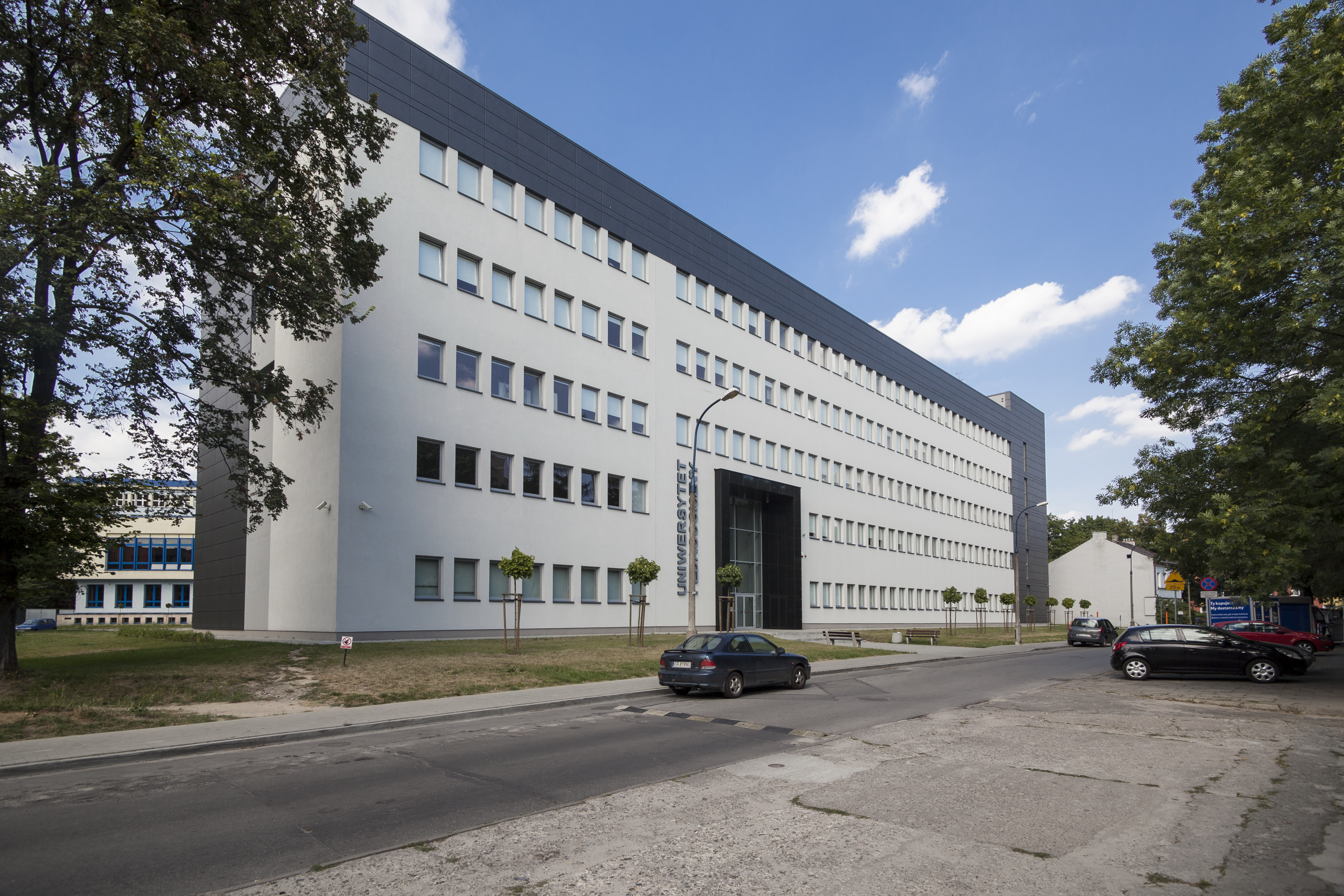
Pedagogical University of Kraków

The University of the National Education Commission is the earliest pedagogical university in postwar Poland. It functions according to the model of integrated education combining theoretical knowledge with practical skills. The mission of the university is reinforced in scientific research and development according to the highest European standards in several dozen fields of studies. It runs first-cycle (bachelor's) and second-cycle (master's) degree programmes, as well as in the third-cycle degree studies (Ph.D.), and post-graduate study courses.

== History ==
At the beginning, the Pedagogical Academy trained elementary school teachers; with the curriculum spanning over a period of 3 years. As early as in 1949, it began training secondary school teachers and was split into a new organizational structure based on departments. The academic posts were appointed, including those of the Senate, the Department Councils, the Rector, Vice-Rectors and the deans.

In 1954 the college received the title of a Higher College. Curriculum increased to 4 years and students graduated with a Master's degree. The Polish October political transformations of 1956 resulted in the college gaining significant autonomy. For the first time the Rector was elected and not nominated. The first elected Rector was Prof. dr Wincenty Danek. Under his administration, the Higher College of Teacher Training rapidly developed and earned even more reputation. From the academic year 1958/1959 studies were extended to five years.

In 1959 the university received the right to offer doctorate degree programs and in 1967 the right to confer the degree of habilitated doctor.

In 1989 a period of political and social transformations resulted in the academy receiving complete independence and self-government. On 1 October 1999, the college was renamed to the Pedagogical Academy of Kraków of the National Education Commission (Akademia Pedagogiczna im. Komisji Edukacji Narodowej w Krakowie). On 3 October 2008, the college was renamed to the Pedagogical University of Kraków of the National Education Commission (Uniwersytet Pedagogiczny im. Komisji Edukacji Narodowej w Krakowie).

== Organizational structure ==
=== Institutes ===
- Institute of Security and Computer Science
- Institute of Biology and Earth Sciences
- Institute of Journalism and International Relations
- Institute of English Philology
- Institute of Polish Philology
- Institute of Philosophy and Sociology
- Institute of History and Archival Studies
- Institute of Painting and Artistic Education
- Institute of Mathematics
- Institute of Information Studies
- Institute of Technical Sciences
- Institute of Modern Languages
- Institute of Pre-School and School Education
- Institute of Special School Education and Teacher Training
- Institute of Social Pedagogy and Family Support
- Institute of Law, Administration and Economics
- Institute of Psychology
- Institute of Social Affairs and Public Health
- Institute of Art and Design

== Rectors ==
- Bolesław Faron (1975–1981)
