= Roman Loth =

Literary historian, bibliographer and editor (1931–2019)

- Born: 11 December 1931; Warsaw, Warsaw Voivodeship, Second Polish Republic
- Died: 30 November 2019 (aged 87); Warsaw, Masovian Voivodeship, Third Polish Republic
- Occupations: Historian, bibliographer, editor
- Spouse: Barbara Regulska (m.1954)
- Parents: Wacław Loth (father); Janina née Grabowska (mother)

Academic background
- Education: University of Warsaw
- Thesis: Kronika życia i twórczości Jana Kasprowicza (1860–1901) (1970)
- Doctoral advisor: Ewa Korzeniewska

Academic work
- Discipline: History
- Sub-discipline: History of literature
- Doctoral students: Beata Dorosz

Roman Loth (11 December 1931 – 30 November 2019) was a literary historian, editor, bibliographer, professor at the Institute of Literary Research of the Polish Academy of Sciences (IBL PAN).

== Biography ==
The son of Wacław Loth and Janina née Grabowska. After the Warsaw Uprising he moved to Radom, where in 1949 he passed matura in the Jan Kochanowski High School in Radom.

From 1949 to 1957 he was a member of the Union of Polish Youth. He graduated in Polish philology from the University of Warsaw in 1954. Also in 1954 he married Barbara Regulska. In 1970 he obtained a doctoral degree based on the work Kronika życia i twórczości Jana Kasprowicza (1860–1901) (Chronicle of the life and work of Jan Kasprowicz [1860–1901]) written under the supervision of Ewa Korzeniewska. In 1975 he obtained habilitation. From 1981 he was a member of the Scientific Council of IBL PAN; from 1987 to 2006 he was its vice-chairman.

Loth supervised the doctorate of Beata Dorosz. In 2004 he was chosen a member of the Warsaw Scientific Society. A Festschrift to him was published in 2011, edited by Beata Dorosz and Paweł Kądziela.

== Works ==
- Młodość Jana Kasprowicza. Szkic biograficzny. Poznań: Wydawnictwo Poznańskie. 1962.
- Podstawowe pojęcia i problemy tekstologii i edytorstwa naukowego. Warszawa: Wydawnictwo Instytutu Badań Literackich PAN. 2006.
- Wspomnienia kochanowskie czyli Radom sprzed półwiecza. Radom: Społeczny Komitet Ratowania Zabytków Radomia. 2007. Second, extended edition: 2012.
- Zapamiętane. Z dawnych lat Instytutu Badań Literackich. Warszawa: Wydawnictwo Instytutu Badań Literackich PAN. 2015.

== Accolades ==
- Knight's Cross of the Order of Polonia Restituta (2008)

== Bibliography ==
- Dorosz, Beata (2020). "Roman Loth (11 grudnia 1931 – 30 listopada 2019). Wspomnienie". Pamiętnik Literacki. The Institute of Literary Research of the Polish Academy of Sciences: 244–252. ISSN 2719-5376. Archived from the original on 10 July 2026.
