= Polish studies =

Study of Polish language and literature

Polish studies, Polish philology or Polonistics (Polish: filologia polska, or polonistyka) is the field of humanities that researches, documents and disseminates the Polish language and Polish literature in both historic and present-day forms.

The history of Polish studies dates back to the 16th century. The first Polish scholars to study the Polish language were Jan Mączyński and Piotr Stoiński (Pierre Statorius).

Academic activities in Polish Studies include conferences, workshops, and book publications by scholars who work and teach on Polish history, culture, art, and politics. The Polish Studies Association is part of the American Association for the Advancement of Slavic Studies and facilitates "the exchange of academic information regarding Polish history, culture, arts, politics, economics, and contemporary affairs, and seeks to enhance contacts between Polish and Western Affairs."

The Departments of Polish Studies exist in all major universities across Poland, and in many academic institutions across the world. They offer students a range of academic programmes with Bachelor and Masters' degrees in the field.

== In the United States ==
In the United States, students taking Polish studies majors focus on the nation, current and historical inhabitants of Polish lands, both current and historical, and instruction includes a wide range of and humanities, such as culture, politics, and economics.

== University programs ==
Some of the Polish Studies programs at U.S. universities include:

- Polish Studies at Georgetown University
- Polish Studies Center at the Indiana University at Bloomington
- Polish Studies Program at the University at Buffalo, The State University of New York
- Polish Studies at Columbia University
- Copernicus Program in Polish Studies at the University of Michigan
- Polish and Polish American Studies at Central Connecticut State University
- Polish Studies at the University of Florida
- The Polish Studies Program at the University of Wisconsin–Madison, the oldest Polish program in the United States
- Polish Studies Program at the University of Washington in Seattle
