= Kościelski Award =

Polish literary award

The Kościelski Award (Polish: Nagroda Fundacji im. Kościelskich, Nagroda Kościelskich) is an independent Polish literary award, awarded since 1962 by the Geneva-based Kościelski Foundation. The jury issues annual awards to "promising writers" 40 years of age or younger. This is the second oldest independent award in Polish literature after the Award of the Union of Polish Writers Abroad that was established in London in 1951.

== Jury ==
Members of the jury include (as of July 2026): François Rosset (chief of the jury), Ewa Zając (secretary), Włodzimierz Bolecki, Anna Estreicher, Jens Herlth, Vera Michalski, Justyna Hanna Orzeł, Ewa Bieńkowska, Tomasz Różycki, Aleksandra Wojda and Jan Zieliński.

== Recipients ==
- Sławomir Mrożek, Andrzej Brycht, Andrzej Busza, Jan Rostworowski (1962)
- Zbigniew Herbert, Zygmunt Kubiak, Jan Winczakiewicz (1963)
- Bogdan Czaykowski, Tadeusz Konwicki, Zofia Romanowiczowa, Bogdan Wojdowski, Wiesław Dymny (1964)
- Wiktor Woroszylski, Tadeusz Chabrowski, Marian Ośniałowski, Andrzej Kijowski (1965)
- Henryk Grynberg, Gustaw Herling-Grudziński, Włodzimierz Odojewski (1966)
- Jarosław Marek Rymkiewicz, Tadeusz Nowak, Jarosław Abramow (1967)
- Jan Błoński, Konstanty Jeleński, Marek Nowakowski, Ryszard Przybylski, Marek Skwarnicki (1968)
- Mieczysław Paszkiewicz, Alina Witkowska, Jan Darowski, Urszula Kozioł, Jerzy Kwiatkowski (1969)
- Jerzy Gierałtowski, Janina Kowalska, Kazimierz Orłoś (1970)
- Bohdan Cywiński, Adam Czerniawski, Jerzy Harasymowicz, Zygmunt Haupt, Wacław Iwaniuk, Zbigniew Żakiewicz (1971)
- Stanisław Barańczak, Bonifacy Miążek, Edward Stachura, Władysław Lech Terlecki (1972)
- Tomasz Burek, Janusz A. Ihnatowicz, Ewa Lipska, Alicja Lisiecka (1973)
- Jerzy W. Borejsza, Alicja Iwańska, Edward Redliński (1974)
- Adam Zagajewski and Julian Kornhauser, Paweł Łysek, Wojciech Karpiński and Marcin Król (1975)
- Ryszard Krynicki, Bolesław Kobrzyński, Bogdan Madej, Joanna Pollakówna (1976)
- Ewa Bieńkowska, Maciej Broński, Małgorzata Szpakowska, Bolesław Taborski (1977)
- Piotr Wojciechowski (1978)
- Jerzy Mirewicz (1979)
- Janusz Węgiełek, Jerzy Pluta, Józef Baran (1980)
- Janusz Anderman, Krzysztof Dybciak, Anna Frajlich-Zając, Jan Komolka (1981)
- Stefan Chwin and Stanisław Rosiek, Jan Góra, Antoni Pawlak, Jan Polkowski (1983)
- Bronisław Maj, Tadeusz Korzeniewski (1984)
- Jerzy Jarzębski (1985)
- Tomasz Jastrun, Adam Michnik, Leszek Szaruga (1986)
- Paweł Huelle, Piotr Sommer (1988)
- Jerzy Pilch, Włodzimierz Bolecki (1989)
- Bronisław Wildstein, Grzegorz Musiał, Marek Zaleski, Wisława Szymborska (1990)
- Marian Stala, Andrzej Bart (1991)
- Krzysztof Myszkowski, Aleksandra Olędzka-Frybesowa (1992)
- Marzanna Bogumiła Kielar, Artur Szlosarek (1993)
- Maciej Niemiec, Tadeusz Słobodzianek, Marek Wojdyło (1994)
- Andrzej Stasiuk, Magdalena Tulli (1995)
- Jacek Baczak, Marcin Świetlicki (1996)
- Olga Tokarczuk (1997)
- Przemysław Czapliński, Jacek Podsiadło (1998)
- Adam Wiedemann, Arkadiusz Pacholski (1999)
- Michał Paweł Markowski, Wojciech Wencel (2000)
- Jerzy Sosnowski(2001)
- Olga Stanisławska (2002)
- Dawid Bieńkowski (2003)
- Tomasz Różycki (2004)
- Jacek Dehnel (2005)
- Jolanta Stefko (2006)
- Mikołaj Łoziński (2007)
- Jacek Dukaj (2008)
- Tadeusz Dąbrowski (2009)
- Marcin Kurek (2010)
- Andrzej Franaszek (2011)
- Andrzej Dybczak (2012)
- Krystyna Dąbrowska (2013)
- Krzysztof Siwczyk (2014)
- Szczepan Twardoch (2015)
- Maciej Płaza (2016)
- Urszula Zajączkowska (2017)
- Joanna Czeczott (2018)
- Aldona Kopkiewicz (2019)
- Małgorzata Rejmer (2020)
- Jan Baron (2021)
- Bartosz Sadulski (2022)
- Urszula Honek (2023)
- Aleksandra Tarnowska (2024)
- Małgorzata Lebda (2025)

== See also ==
- List of literary prizes
