= 2002 Nobel Prize in Literature =

- Imre Kertész
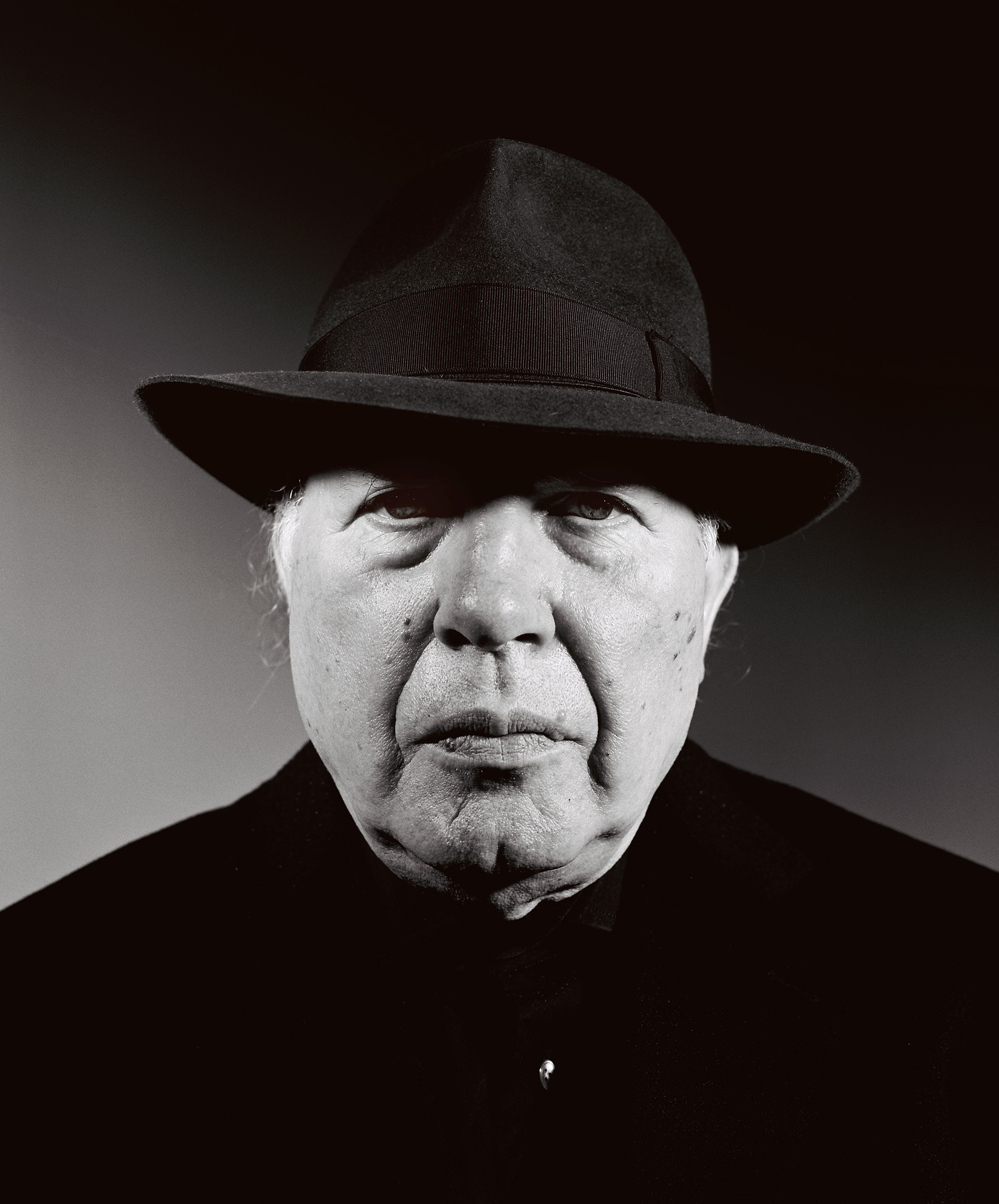
- "for writing that upholds the fragile experience of the individual against the barbaric arbitrariness of history."
- Date: 10 October 2002 (announcement); 10 December 2002 (ceremony)
- Location: Stockholm, Sweden
- Presented by: Swedish Academy
- First award: 1901
- Website: Official website

The 2002 Nobel Prize in Literature was awarded to Hungarian novelist Imre Kertész (1929–2016) "for writing that upholds the fragile experience of the individual against the barbaric arbitrariness of history." He was the only Nobel Prize in Literature recipient from Hungary until 2025 when László Krasznahorkai won.

== Laureate ==
Before its release in 1975, Imre Kertész worked on his first book, Sorstalanság ("Fatelessness"), for a long time. The novel is about a young György Köves, who is detained and sent to concentration camps but ultimately survives. Kertész wrote about what it means to live with an intellectual death sentence and how to cope with living in a world where so many people have perished. With his books, he identifies with the literary genre known as "witness fiction," in which a trauma is described from personal experience by the author. His other celebrated prose include A nyomkereső ("The Pathseeker", 1977) and Kaddis a meg nem született gyermekért ("Kaddish for an Unborn Child", 1990).

== Reactions ==
Kertész was a controversial figure within Hungary, especially since being Hungary's first Nobel Laureate in Literature, he still lived in Germany. This tension was exacerbated by a 2009 interview with Die Welt, in which Kertész vowed himself a "Berliner" and called Budapest "completely balkanized." Many Hungarian newspapers reacted negatively to this statement, claiming it to be hypocritical. Other critics viewed the Budapest comment ironically, saying it represented "a grudge policy that is painfully and unmistakably, characteristically Hungarian." Kertész later clarified in a Duna TV interview that he had intended his comment to be "constructive" and called Hungary "his homeland".
