= Letter of 59 =

Open letter critiquing the PZPR

- Original title: List 59
- Created: 1975-1976
- Authors: Jacek Kuroń; Jakub Karpiński; Jan Olszewski
- Media type: Open Letter
- Subject: Critique of Polish United Workers' Party reforms

The Letter of 59 (Polish: List 59) also known as the Memorial of 59 and the Memorandum of 59 (Polish: Memoriał 59), was an open letter signed by 66 (or 59 at first, hence the name) Polish intellectuals who protested against the changes of the Constitution of the People's Republic of Poland that were made by the communist party of Poland in 1975. Additional people signed the letter in January 1976.

The letter was closely related to the Helsinki Accords. On September 1, 1975, the Polish socialist government signed "The Blue Book" of the OSCE (the Organization for Security and Co-operation in Europe) committing to, among other things, respect for human rights and refraining from the threat or use of force. Meanwhile, the new changes to the Polish constitution proposed by the Polish United Workers' Party after the Helsinki Accords, included new ideological clauses pronouncing and reaffirming the "steering role of the Party in the nation," the "socialist character of the nation," a "permanent and unbreakable alliance with the Soviet Union," and most of all, that the "government obligation to respect the rights of the citizens" is conditional only, and "dependent on the citizens fulfilling their obligations towards the country."

The communist government criticized the letter of protest publicly, with Edward Gierek calling the signatories "furious anticommunists, politically blind". Eventually, although the constitution was changed, the above fragments were redrafted to sound more neutral:

1. the steering role of the Party "in the nation" was changed to "in the building of socialism"
2. "alliance" with the USSR was replaced with "friendship"
3. citizens' rights were not linked with their obligations

The government could not officially persecute the signatories for their letter, although various semi-official persecutions were implemented, for example, some authors had the government agencies refuse to print or distribute their books for several years thereafter.

== Signatories ==
Italics refer to the additional signatories from early 1976

- Stefan Amsterdamski
- Stanisław Barańczak
- Ewa Bieńkowska
- Jacek Bierezin
- Henryk Błachnio
- Irena Byrska
- Tadeusz Byrski
- Bohdan Chwedeńczuk
- Ludwik Cohn
- Andrzej Drawicz
- Jerzy Ficowski
- Kornel Filipowicz
- Zbigniew Herbert
- Ryszard Herczyński
- Maryla Hopfinger
- Zdzisław Jaroszewski
- Anna Kamieńska
- Jakub Karpiński
- Wojciech Karpiński
- Jan Kielanowski
- Stefan Kisielewski
- Jacek Kleyff

- Leszek Kołakowski
- Julian Kornhauser
- Maria Komiłowicz
- Mieczysław Kotlarczyk
- Marcin Król
- Ryszard Krynicki
- Jacek Kuroń
- Stanisław Leśniewski
- Edward Lipiński
- Jan Józef Lipski
- Zdzisław Łapiński
- Hanna Malewska
- ks. Stanisław Małkowski
- Jerzy Markuszewski
- Adam Mauersberger
- Adam Michnik
- Halina Mikołajska
- Jan Nepomucen Miller
- Ludwik Muzyczka
- Zygmunt Mycielski
- Jerzy Narbutt
- Jan Olszewski
- Antoni Pajdak
- Krzysztof Pomian
- Hanna Rudzka-Cybisowa
- Józef Rybicki
- o. Jacek Salij
- Władysław Siła-Nowicki
- Stanisław Skalski
- Antoni Słonimski
- Aniela Steinsbergowa
- Julian Stryjkowski
- Jan Józef Szczepański
- Adam Szczypiorski
- Kazimierz Szelągowski
- Wisława Szymborska
- Jacek Trznadel
- Tadeusz Wojnarowski
- Maria Wosiek
- Adam Zagajewski
- Wacław Zawadzki
- Barbara Zbrożyna
- ks. Jan Zieja
- Wojciech Ziembiński

In addition in January 1976, 78 emigrants and exiled Polish intellectuals also signed the letter, including:

- Adam Ciołkosz
- Lidia Ciołkosz
- Maria Danilewiczowa
- Józef Garliński
- Gustaw Herling-Grudziński

- Stefania Kossowska
- Jan Kott
- Józef Łobodowski
- Tadeusz Nowakowski
- Edward Bernard Raczyński
- Zofia Romanowiczowa
- Tymon Terlecki
- Wiktor Trościanko
- Leopold Tyrmand
- Józef Wittlin

== See also ==
- Letter of 34
- Open Letter to the Party
