= László Földényi =

László Földényi may refer to:

- László F. Földényi (born 1952), Hungarian critic, essayist and art theorist
- László Földényi (actor) (1895–1960), Hungarian stage and film actor
