= Jarzębski =

Jarzębski (masculine), Jarzębska (feminine) is a Polish surname. Notable people with the surname include:

- Adam Jarzębski
- Jerzy Jarzębski
- Stefan Jarzębski (1917–2008), Polish engineer and politician
