= Mieczysław Porębski =

Polish art historian (1921–2012)

- Born: 31 March 1921; Gniezno, Poland
- Died: 10 September 2012 (aged 91); Warszawa, Poland
- Occupation: Art historian

Mieczysław Porębski (31 March 1921 – 10 September 2012) was a Polish art historian, critic and theorist.

== Biography ==
In 1938 he started to study art history at the Jagiellonian University. His studies were interrupted by the outbreak of the World War II. During the Nazi occupation, he attended the School of Artistic Crafts (Kunstgewerbeschule) and collaborated with Tadeusz Kantor's underground theatre. In 1944, he was arrested for underground activities. He was imprisoned in the Gross-Rosen and Sachsenhausen concentration camps.

From 1950 to 1969 he was a lecturer at the Academy of Fine Arts in Warsaw. From 1952 to 1957 he was editor-in-chief of the magazine Przegląd Artystyczny. From 1970 he was a professor at the Jagiellonian University. From 1974 he was a curator at the National Museum in Kraków. In 1990 he was elected a member of the Polish Academy of Arts and Sciences. Tadeusz Różewicz dedicated to him the poem Nożyk profesora (2001).

== Books ==
- Sztuka naszego czasu: zbiór szkiców i artykułów krytycznych z lat 1945–1955. Warszawa. 1956.
- Malowane dzieje. Warszawa. 1961.
- Interregnum: studia z historii sztuki polskiej XIX i XX wieku. Warszawa. 1975.
- Granica współczesności: ze studiów nad kształtowaniem się poglądów artystycznych XX wieku. Wrocław. 1965.
- Pożegnanie z krytyką. Kraków. 1966.
- Kubizm: wprowadzenie do sztuki XX wieku. Omega. Warszawa. 1966.
- Ikonosfera. Warszawa. 1972.
- Sztuka a informacja. Kraków, Wrocław. 1975.

== Awards ==
- Gold Cross of Merit (22 July 1952)
- Medal of the 10th Anniversary of People's Poland (19 January 1955)
- International critics' prize at the Venice Biennale (1956)
- Commander's Cross of the Order of Polonia Restituta (1991)
- Kazimierz Wyka Award (1995)
- Kraków Book of the Month Award (September 2002)
- Gold Gloria Artis Medal for Merit to Culture (2011)

== Bibliography ==
- Czerni, Krystyna (2013). "Mieczysław Porębski (1921–2012)" (PDF). Biuletyn Historii Sztuki: 591–607. Archived from the original (PDF) on 8 November 2024.
- Poprzęcka, Maria (2013). "Mieczysław Porębski (31 III 1921–10 IX 2012)" (PDF). Rocznik Polskiej Akademii Umiejętności: 247–251. Archived from the original (PDF) on 11 May 2024.
- "Bibliografia prac Mieczysława Porębskiego" (PDF). d1uip03pwa14dd.cloudfront.net. Archived from the original (PDF) on 11 May 2024.
