= Leipzig Book Award for European Understanding =

German literary award

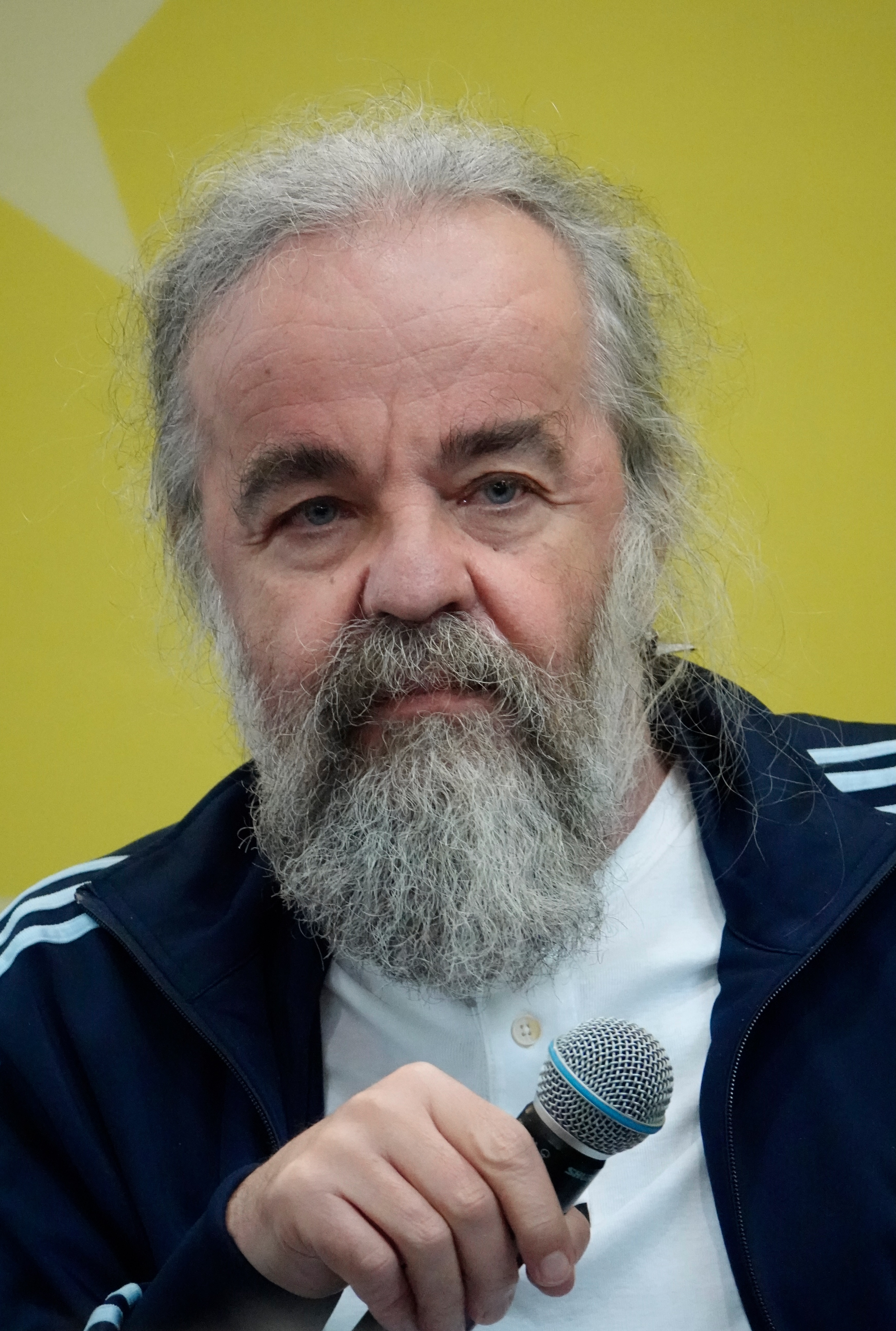
Miljenko Jergović - Leipzig Book Prize for European Understanding 2026

The City of Leipzig awards the Leipzig Book Award for European Understanding (Leipziger Buchpreis zur Europäischen Verständigung) which has been given since 1994. The award is endowed with prize money of 20,000 euros and is presented every year during the official opening of the Leipzig Book Fair.

== Recipients ==
- 1994: Ryszard Kapuściński (Poland)
- 1994: Eckhard Thiele (Germany)
- 1995: Péter Nádas (Hungary)
- 1995: Svetlana Geier (Germany)
- 1996: Aleksandar Tišma (Serbia)
- 1996: Fritz Mierau (Germany)
- 1997: Imre Kertész (Hungary)
- 1997: Antonín J. Liehm (Czech Republic)
- 1998: Svetlana Alexievich (Belarus)
- 1998: Ilma Rakusa (Switzerland)
- 1998: Andreas Tretner (Germany)
- 1999: Eric Hobsbawm (United Kingdom)
- 1999: Nenad Popović (Serbia)
- 2000: Hanna Krall (Poland)
- 2000: Peter Urban (Germany)
- 2001: Claudio Magris (Italy)
- 2001: Norbert Randow (Germany)
- 2002: Bora Ćosić (Serbia)
- 2002: Ludvík Kundera (Czech Republic)
- 2003: Hugo Claus (Belgium)
- 2003: Barbara Antkowiak (Germany)
- 2004: Dževad Karahasan (Bosnia and Herzegovina)
- 2004: Gábor Csordás (Hungary)
- 2005: Slavenka Drakulić (Croatia)
- 2006: Yurii Andrukhovych (Ukraine)
- 2007: Gerd Koenen (Germany)
- 2007: Michail Ryklin (Russia)
- 2008: Geert Mak (Netherlands)
- 2009: Karl Schlögel (Germany)
- 2010: György Dalos (Hungary)
- 2011: Martin Pollack (Austria)
- 2012: Ian Kershaw (United Kingdom)
- 2012: Timothy D. Snyder (United States)
- 2013: Klaus-Michael Bogdal (Germany)
- 2014: Pankaj Mishra (India)
- 2015: Mircea Cărtărescu (Romania)
- 2016: Heinrich August Winkler (Germany)
- 2017: Mathias Énard (France)
- 2018: Åsne Seierstad (Norway)
- 2019: Masha Gessen (United States/Russia)
- 2020: László F. Földényi (Hungary)
- 2021: Johnny Pitts (United Kingdom/United States)
- 2022: Karl-Markus Gauß (Austria)
- 2023: Maria Stepanova (Russia)
- 2024: Omri Boehm (Germany/Israel)
- 2025: Alhierd Bacharevič (Belarus)
- 2026: Miljenko Jergović (Croatia/Bosnia)
