= Przemysław Czapliński =

Literary historian, theorist and critic (born 1962)

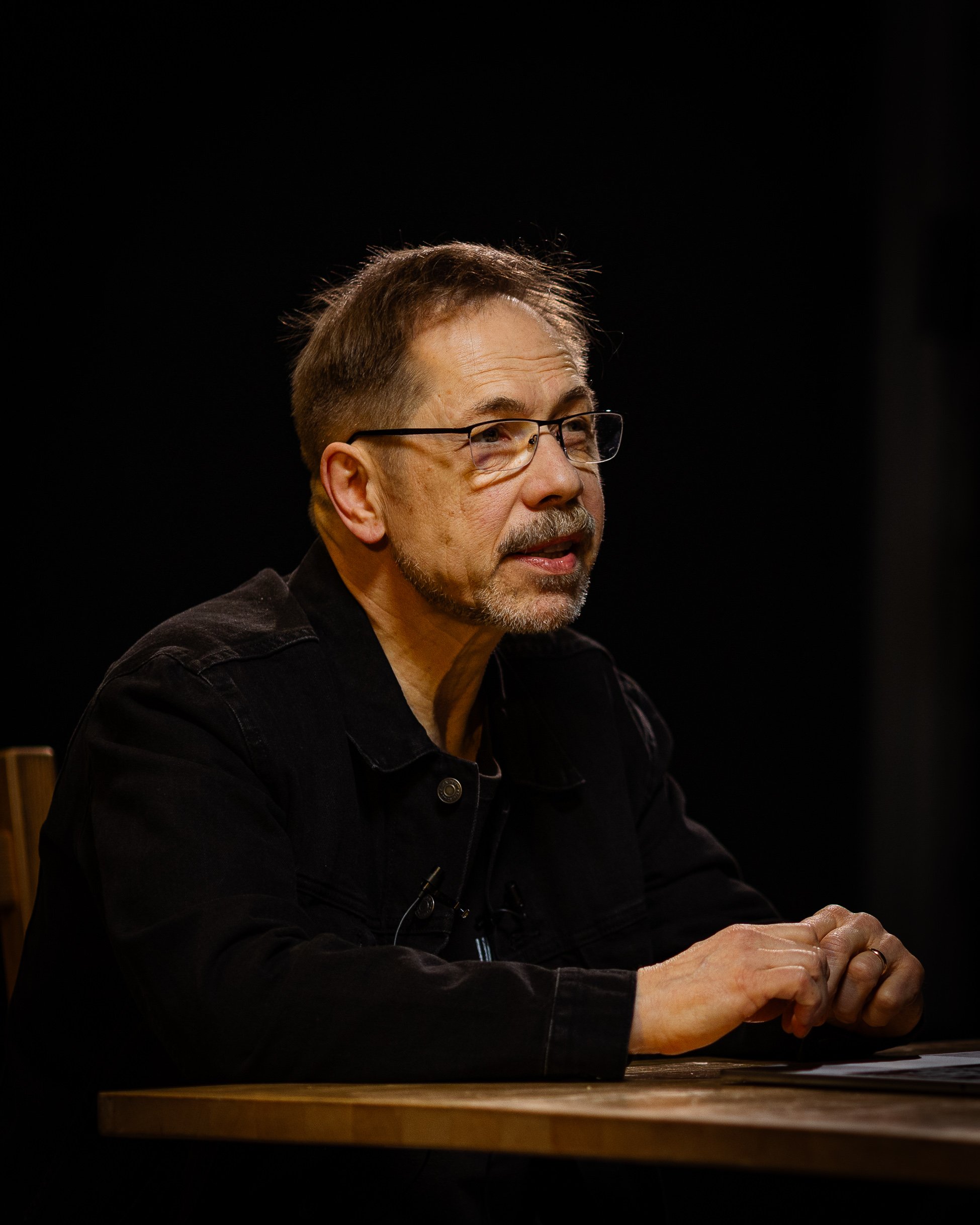
- Przemysław Czapliński, 2025
- Born: 6 November 1962 (age 63); Poznań
- Occupations: Literary historian, theorist and critic
- Employer: Adam Mickiewicz University in Poznań

Academic background
- Education: Adam Mickiewicz University in Poznań
- Doctoral advisor: Janina Abramowska

Przemysław Czapliński (born 6 November 1962) is a literary historian, theorist and critic, professor at the Adam Mickiewicz University in Poznań, member of the Polish Academy of Sciences.

== Biography ==
He was born as the son of Andrzej Czapliński, classical philologist, and Zofia Opatowicz-Czaplińska, physician. In 1986 he graduated in Polish literature from the Adam Mickiewicz University in Poznań. In 1992 he obtained doctorate at the Adam Mickiewicz University in Poznań upon dissertation Poetyka manifestu literackiego w dwudziestoleciu międzywojennym supervised by Janina Abramowska. In 1998 he obtained habilitation.

He supervised fourteen doctoral dissertations. He was a member of the jury of the Nike Award from 1997 to 2001 and from 2011 to 2013. In 2016 he was elected correspondent member of the Polish Academy of Sciences.

== Books ==
- Tadeusz Konwicki. Poznań: Rebis. 1994.
- Poetyka manifestu literackiego 1918–1939. Warszawa. 1997.
- Ślady przełomu. O prozie polskiej 1976–1996. Kraków. 1997. ISBN 83-08-02723-7.
- Literatura polska 1976–1998. Przewodnik po prozie i poezji. Kraków. 1999. Co-authored with Piotr Śliwiński.
- Kontrapunkt. Rozmowy o książkach. Poznań. 1999. Co-authored with Piotr Śliwiński.
- Wzniosłe tęsknoty. Nostalgie w prozie lat dziewięćdziesiątych. Kraków. 2001.
- Mikrologi ze śmiercią: motywy tanatyczne we współczesnej literaturze polskiej. Poznań. 2001.
- Ruchome marginesy: szkice o literaturze lat 90. Kraków. 2002. ISBN 83-240-0145-X.
- Świat podrobiony. Krytyka i literatura wobec nowej rzeczywistości. Kraków. 2003.
- Efekt bierności. Literatura w czasie normalnym. Kraków. 2004.
- Powrót centrali. Literatura w nowej rzeczywistości. Kraków. 2007.
- Polska do wymiany. Późna nowoczesność i nasze wielkie narracje. Warszawa. 2009.
- Resztki nowoczesności. Dwa studia o literaturze i życiu. Kraków. 2011.
- Poruszona mapa. Kraków. 2016. ISBN 978-83-08-06195-4.
- Literatura i jej natury. Przewodnik ekokrytyczny dla nauczycieli i uczniów szkół średnich. Poznań. 2017. Co-authored with Joanna B. Bednarek and Dawid Gostyński.
- Rozbieżne emancypacje. Przewodnik po prozie 1976–2020. Kraków. 2024.

== Awards ==
In 1996 he received Medal Młodej Sztuki. In 1998 he received Kościelski Award. In 2005 he received Kazimierz Wyka Award.
