= Friedrich-Gundolf-Preis =

German literary award

- Location: Darmstadt
- Country: Germany
- Presented by: Deutsche Akademie für Sprache und Dichtung
- Reward: €20,000
- First award: 1964
- Website: www.deutscheakademie.de/en/awards/friedrich-gundolf-preis/

Friedrich-Gundolf-Preis is a literary prize of Germany. It was established by the Deutsche Akademie für Sprache und Dichtung in 1964 to promote German culture outside Germany. The award is named after the Germanist Friedrich Gundolf. The award is endowed with €15,000.

== Recipients ==
- 1964 Robert Minder
- 1965 Frederick Norman
- 1966 Victor Lange
- 1967 Eudo C. Mason
- 1968 Oskar Seidlin
- 1969 Eduard Goldstücker
- 1970 Erik Lunding
- 1971 Zoran Konstantinovi
- 1972 Ladislao Mittner
- 1973 Gustav Korlén
- 1974 Herman Meyer
- 1975 Elizabeth M. Wilkinson
- 1976 Marian Szyrocki
- 1977 Franz H. Mautner
- 1978 Claude David
- 1979 Zdenko Skreb
- 1980 Lev Kopelev
- 1981 Leonard Forster
- 1982 Tomio Tezuka
- 1983 Jean Fourquet
- 1984 Stuart Atkins
- 1985 Mazzino Montinari
- 1986 Siegbert S. Prawer
- 1987 Viktor Žmegač
- 1988 Feng Zhi
- 1989 Leslie Bodi
- 1990 Konstantin Asadowski
- 1991 Giorgio Strehler
- 1992 Emil Skala
- 1993 Patrice Chéreau
- 1994 Helen Wolff
- 1995 Philippe Lacoue-Labarthe
- 1996 Volkmar Sander
- 1997 Imre Kertész
- 1998 Shulamit Volkov
- 1999 Thomas von Vegesack
- 2000 Ryszard Krynicki
- 2001 Fuad Rifka
- 2002 Massimo Cacciari
- 2003 Per Øhrgaard
- 2004 Isidor Levin
- 2005 László F. Földényi
- 2006 Kim Kwang-Kyu
- 2007 Nora Iuga
- 2008 Jurko Prochasko
- 2009 Nicholas Boyle
- 2010 Şara Sayın
- 2011 Feliu Formosa
- 2012 Bernard Lortholary
- 2013 Mati Sirkel
- 2014 Drinka Gojković
- 2015 Neil MacGregor
- 2016 Hubert Orłowski
- 2017 László Márton
- 2018 Miguel Sáenz
- 2019 Paul Michael Lützeler
- 2020 Tatiana Baskakova
- 2021 Khalid Al-Maaly
- 2022 Alison Lewis
- 2023 Mahshid Mirmoezi
- 2024 Petro Rychlo
- 2025 Rüdiger Görner
- 2026 Hiroshi Yamamoto
