= Ireneusz Kania =

Translator, essayist and literary critic (1940–2023)

- Born: 19 September 1940; Wieluń
- Died: 7 October 2023 (aged 83); Kraków
- Other name: Marian Barycz
- Occupations: Translator, essayist, literary critic

Ireneusz Kania (19 September 1940 – 7 October 2023) was a translator, essayist and literary critic.

== Biography ==
The son of Stefan Kania, craftsman, and Wanda née Muszalska. From 1959 to 1964 he studied Romance philology at the Jagiellonian University in Kraków. Between 1964 and 1968, he worked as a proofreader, then as a technical editor and production inspector at the Kraków office of Polish Scientific Publishers PWN. From 1975 he worked at the Wydawnictwo Literackie, as editor and then deputy director of the Translation Section, where he was responsible for Iberian and Latin American literature. In 1978 he spent a month in Cuba. From 1980 to 1983 he was a member of Polish Writers' Union (ZLP). He translated from the following languages: English, German, Swedish, Greek, Latin, Hebrew, Sanskrit, Pali, Tibetan, Russian, French, Italian, Spanish, Portuguese, and Romanian.

== Works ==
=== Books ===
- Ścieżka nocy. Kraków: Wydawnictwo Znak. 2001. ISBN 83-240-0029-1.
- Pieśni losu. Kraków: Wydawnictwo Austeria. 2021. ISBN 978-83-7866-429-1.
- Dług metafizyczny. Eseje i rozmowy. Kraków: Wydawnictwo Pasaże. 2021. ISBN 978-83-64511-83-7.
- Tłuk pięściowy i czerwone jabłuszko. Uwagi o przekładach poezji Wisławy Szymborskiej. Kraków: Wydawnictwo Austeria. 2023. ISBN 978-83-7866-612-7.
- Czy możliwa jest uniwersalna filozofia muzyki?. Kraków: Wydawnictwo Austeria. 2023. ISBN 978-83-7866-571-7.
- Trzy przypisy do naszych czasów. Kraków: Wydawnictwo Austeria. 2023. ISBN 978-83-7866-567-0.

=== Translations into Polish ===
- Bardo Thodol
- Mircea Eliade, Occultism, Witchcraft and Cultural Fashions

== Awards ==
- Kraków Book of the Month Award for Muttavali. Księga wypisów starobuddyjskich (May 1999)
- Officer's Cross of the Medal „Meritul Cultural” (2004)
- Kazimierz Wyka Award (2022)
