= Zofia Romanowicz =

Polish writer (1922–2010)

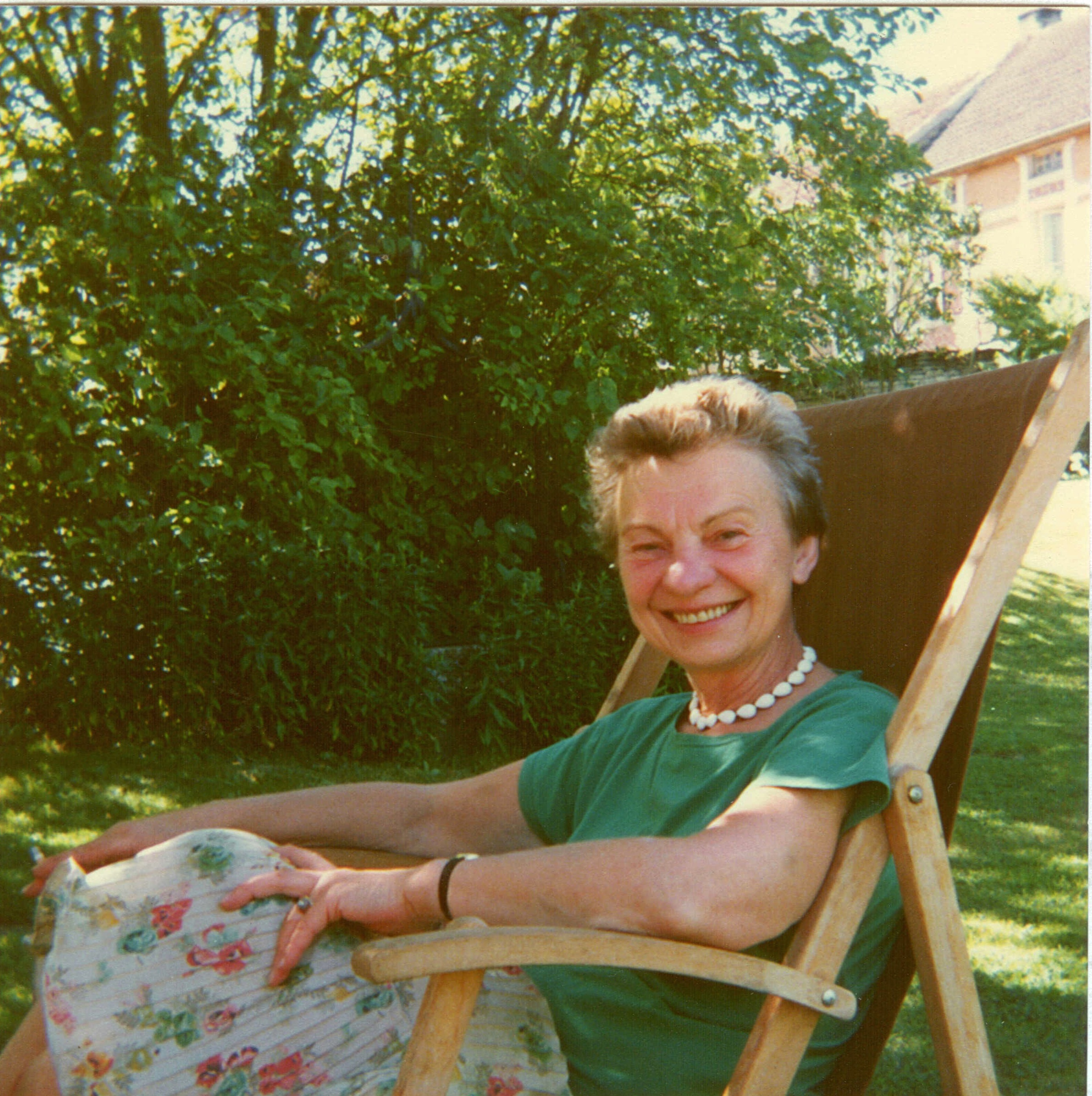
- Portrait of Romanowicz in Bourgogne-Franche-Comté, August 1987
- Born: Zofia Górska; October 18, 1922; Radom, Kielce Voivodeship, Second Polish Republic
- Died: March 28, 2012 (aged 89); Lailly-en-Val, Loiret, French Fifth Republic

Zofia Romanowicz (née Górska; 18 October 1922 – 28 March 2010) was a Polish émigré novelist, essayist, poet, and translator and an eminent member of the Polish literary and cultural communities in exile as well as Parisian intellectual circles.

== Biography ==
Born in Radom, Romanowicz was 16 when World War II broke out on September 1, 1939. She stayed in Radom, where she participated in the Union of Armed Struggle as a courier. Arrested together with her father by the Gestapo in January 1941, she was sentenced to death and imprisoned first in Kamienne and Keltz, then in Pintschow. In April 1942, she was sent to the women’s concentration camp of Ravensbrück north of Berlin. She stayed there until September 1943, when she was assigned to one of its labor camps, Neu-Rohlau near Karlsbad, where she worked in a porcelain factory. At the end of the war, she reached the American lines and then Rome, where she was mentored by Melchior Wańkowicz. She graduated in 1946 from the high school established in Porto San Giorgio by the Polish II Corps.

She moved to Paris, French Fourth Republic and enrolled in romance philology studies at Sorbonne University under the mentorship of Professor Jean Boutière. In 1948, she met Kazimierz Romanowicz (1916-2010), a former employee in the French department of the Polish bookstore company Gebethner & Wolff and an officer in the Polish II Corps. They were married in July 1948 and managed the bookstore and publishing company Libella that Kazimierz Romanowicz had founded on the Île Saint-Louis in Paris in 1946 as part of the cultural section of the Polish II Corps. Together they founded the Galerie Lambert in 1959 next door to the bookstore. Both venues were among the most important centers of émigré Polish culture during the Cold War. A supporter of human rights and civil liberties, Zofia Romanowicz, along with 66 Polish intellectuals, signed the Letter of 59 in 1976 in protest against proposed amendments to the Polish Constitution.

She was an important cultural figure in Polish émigré circles and among Parisian intellectuals. After Libella and the Galerie Lambert closed in 1993, she continued her cultural activities in France and Poland. She died at the Polish Retirement Home in Lailly-en-Val, near Orléans in 2010 at age 87.

== Career ==
Romanowicz wrote her first poems in high school in Radom and produced several poems during her incarcerations. These poems were copied by her camp inmates into very small notebooks and carried by her to freedom. She published her first story, Tomuś and several of her poems from camp while in Rome with the Polish II Corps. After 1948, she used her married name to sign her works. She published several short translations and a number of short stories dealing with her war-time experiences. Her prison and camp poems were published by the in a collective volume entitled Ravensbrück. Wiersze obozowe [Ravensbrück: Camp Poems] in 1961. While studying at the Sorbonne, she became a specialist of troubadour poetry, participated in international conferences, and in 1963 produced an anthology of Provençal troubadour poetry in Polish translation, Brewiarz miłości, which was republished in Poland in 2000.

In the mid-1950s, she started writing essays and short stories in the journals Wiadomości Literackie (London) and Kultura (Paris). Her first novel, Baśka i Barbara, which was inspired by her daughter and dealt with the topic of raising a bilingual and bicultural child in emigration, was first published by Libella in 1956; it was reprinted twice in Poland in 1958 where it became favorite reading. In 1964, the Warsaw State Publishing Institute PIW cancelled the planned publication of her novel Szklana kula because Kazimierz Romanowicz had been exporting books that were forbidden by the Communist regime. Libella published the novel in 1964, and PIW reprinted it in 2021 as part of the press’s 70th anniversary celebrations. Romanowicz’ novels were translated into English, French, German and Hebrew throughout the 1960s and earned her the Kościelski Award in 1964.

In 1965 Zofia Romanowicz published 17 short stories in the volume Próby i zamiary and began publishing her novels through the Polish Literary Foundation in London. After an interruption of 26 years in her publications in Poland, her novel Łagodne oko błękitu, perhaps her most important contribution to the literature of the camps, was reprinted by the Catholic publishing house PAX in 1987 in Warsaw and received Warsaw’s Literary Fund Prize for the most important literary novelistic achievement. After the end of the Cold War in 1989, as the émigré and local Polish writing communities reunited, she published her last two novels, Ruchome schody and Trybulacje proboszcza P in Poland. She became a collaborator of Tygodnik Solidarność in 1991 and of Odra in 1999, and her articles and essays also appeared in Tygodnik Powszechny and Nowa Kultura.

Zofia Romanowicz made major contributions to European literature during the second half of the 20th century. Even though she was forbidden to return to her homeland and to publish in Poland during the early postwar years, she maintained literary contacts there. Her publications in the émigré milieu and in Poland are a mirror of the political and cultural ups and downs of the Cold War. She wrote in Polish but on more than one occasion penned the first draft of the French translations of her works. In 1976, she became a member of the jury for the annual literary prize given by Wiadomości Literackie in London. She was a member of the Union of Polish Writers in Exile from 1946 to 1989 and a member of the Polish Writers' Union from 1989 to 2010.

== Honors and awards ==
1960 Przejście przez Morze Czerwone [Passage Through the Red Sea] named best book of the year published in emigration by Radio Free Europe

1964 Kościelski Award

1966 Próby i zamiary [Attempts and Trials] receives “Wiadomiści Literackie” Award for best Polish book published in emigration in 1965

1971 Alfred Jurzykowski Prize for the totality of her work

1973 Groby Napoleona [Napoleon’s Tombs] named best book of 1972 published in emigration by Radio Free Europe

1976 Gold Medal for the totality of her poetic work, given by the Friends of Polish Art in Detroit on the occasion of their 200th anniversary

1981 Skrytki [Places of Oblivion] receives from the Union of Polish Writers in Exile the Hermina Naglerowa Prize for best book published in emigration in 1980

1985 Skrytki [Places of Oblivion] receives the Zygmunt Hertz Prize awarded by the Literary Institute of Maisons-Laffitte

1987 Łagodne oko błękitu [The Blue Sweater] receives the Literary Fund’s (Warsaw) Prize for the most important literary novelistic achievement of the year

1988 Laureate of the Union of Polish Writers’ Prize for the totality of her work

1994 Cavalier Cross of the Polish Republic’s Order of Merit

1994 Diploma from the Minister of Foreign Affairs of the Polish republic for outstanding contributions to Polish culture

1994 Publishers’ Prize of the Polish PEN-Club

1994 Honorary Distinction of the Polish Association of Book Publishers

2000 Prize for Literature of the Polish Ministry of Culture and National Heritage

== Publications ==
Brewiarz miłości. Warsaw: Ossolineum, 1963.

Baśka i Barbara. Paris, Libella, 1956. Warsaw: PIW, 1958.

Przejście przez Morze Czerwone. Paris, Libella, 1960. Warsaw: PIW, 1961.

Ravensbrück. Wiersze obozowe. Warsaw: Zarząd główny, Klub Ravensbrück, 1961.

Słońce dziesięciu linii. Paris, Libella, 1963.

Szklana kula. Paris, Libella, 1964. Warsaw: PIW, 2021.

Próby i zamiary. London, Polska Fundacja Literacka, 1965.

Łagodne oko błękitu. Paris: Libella, 1968. Warsaw: PAX, 1987. Audio book, Warsaw, Zakład nagrań i Wydawnictw Związku Niewidomych, Pax, 1989.

Groby Napoleona. London, Polska Fundacja Literacka, 1972.

Sono felice. London, Polska Fundacja Literacka, 1977.

Skrytki. Paris: Instytut Literacki, 1980.

Na wyspie. Paris: Instytut Literacki, 1984.

Ruchome schody. Warsaw: PIW, 1995.

Trubadurzy prowansalscy: liryki najpiękniejsze. Edited by Jerzy Kapica. Reprint of Brewiarz miłości. Toruń: Algo, 2000.

Trybulacje proboszcza P. Toruń, Archiwum emigracji, 2001.

== Translations ==
Passage Through the Red Sea. Translated by Virgilia Peterson.New York, NY: Harcourt Brace, 1962.

Le Passage de la Mer Rouge. Traduit par Georges Lisowski. Paris: Seuil, 1961.

Der Zug durchs Rote Meer. Berlin: Suhrkampf, 1962, 2nd edition in 1964. Reprinted in 1982, 1992, and 1996.

Edhe një ditë shprese. Translation of fragments of Passage Through the Red Sea by Eqrem Basha. Macedonia: Rilindja, 1978.

Ha-ma’abar b-Yam Sup. Translation of Passage Through the Red Sea by Ada Pagis. Tel Aviv: Hoca’ah Am Obed, 1995.

Tricoul albastru. Bucarest, Albatros, 1973.

Le Chandail bleu. Translated by the author and Jean-Louis Faivre d’Arcier. Paris: Seuil, 1971.

Île Saint-Louis. Translated by Erik Veaux. Paris: Editions du Rocher, 2002.

“Les galettes de pommes de terre.” Traduit par Alice-Catherine Carls. Les Cahiers bleus, Printemps 1983. pp. 63–65.

“Oubliettes. Chapitre XV.” Adapté par l’auteur avec la collaboration de Patrick Waldberg. Cahiers de l’Est, No. 18-19, 1979. pp. 159–176.

“The Screen.” Translated by Jan Solecki. The Antioch Review, Vol. 20, No. 3 (Autumn, 1960). pp. 347–364. JSTOR 4610272
