= Kazimierz Wyka Award =

Polish literary award (established in 1980)

Kazimierz Wyka Award is awarded annually in the fields of literary criticism, essay writing, and literary history by the Marshal of the Lesser Poland Voivodeship and the Mayor of Kraków. Established in 1980, it is named after Kazimierz Wyka.

== Recipients ==
- 1980 – Jerzy Kwiatkowski
- 1981 – Jan Błoński
- 1984 – Zygmunt Greń
- 1985 – Marian Stępień
- 1986 – Leszek Bugajski
- 1987 – Stanisław Burkot
- 1989 – Franciszek Ziejka
- 1991 – Jerzy Jarzębski
- 1992 – Stanisław Balbus
- 1993 – Zbigniew Herbert
- 1994 – Włodzimierz Maciąg
- 1995 – Mieczysław Porębski
- 1996 – Jan Pieszczachowicz
- 1997 – Jacek Łukasiewicz
- 1998 – Marian Stala
- 2000 – Tadeusz Nyczek
- 2001 – Maria Janion
- 2002 – Michał Głowiński
- 2004 – Przemysław Czapliński
- 2013 – Andrzej Franaszek
- 2015 – Andrzej Mencwel
- 2018 – Małgorzata Łukasiewicz
- 2019 – Jacek Leociak
- 2020 – Janusz Drzewucki
- 2021 – Maria Poprzęcka
- 2022 – Ireneusz Kania
- 2023 – Tadeusz Sławek
- 2024 – Paweł Próchniak
- 2025 – Anna Nasiłowska
- 2026 – Piotr Oczko
