= Ryszard Krynicki =

Polish poet and translator (born 1943)

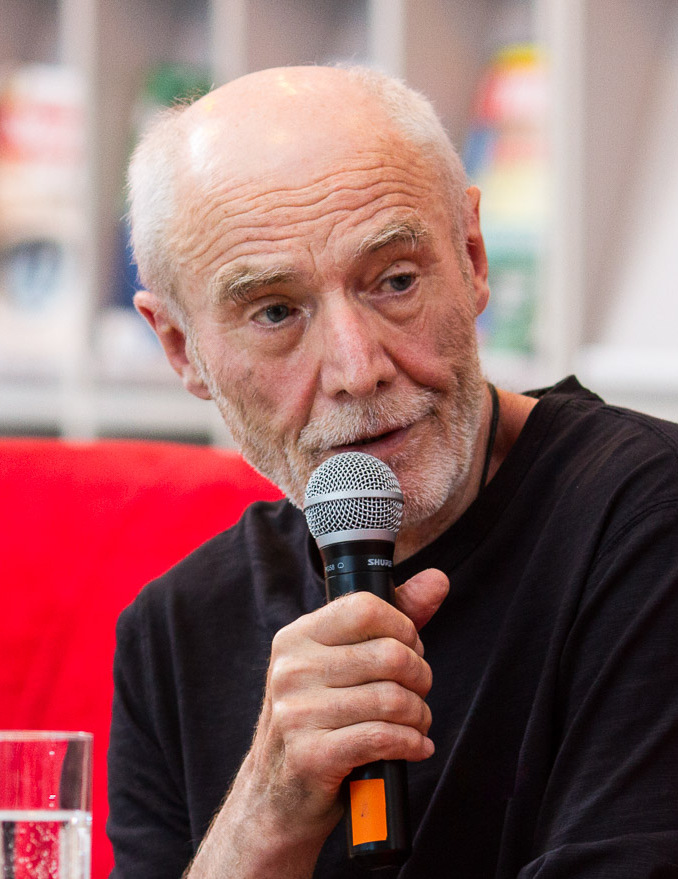
- Krynicki on Authors’ Reading Month 2015, Wrocław, Poland
- Born: June 28, 1943 (age 83); St. Valentin, Austria
- Education: Adam Mickiewicz University
- Occupations: poet, translator, publisher
- Writing career
- Period: 1964–
- Genres: poetry, translation
- Notable awards: Kościelski Award (1976); Friedrich-Gundolf-Preis (2000); Silver Medal for Merit to Culture – Gloria Artis (2005); Zbigniew Herbert International Literary Award (2015)
- Literary movement: Polish New Wave

Ryszard Krynicki (Polish: [ˈrɨʂard krɨˈɲit͡skʲi]; born 28 June 1943) is a Polish poet and translator, member of the Polish "New Wave" Movement. He is regarded as one of the most prominent post-war contemporary Polish poets. In 2015, he was awarded the Zbigniew Herbert International Literary Award as a recognition for his poetry works.

== Life and works ==
He was born on 28 June 1943 in St. Valentin, Austria. After World War II, he moved to Poland, where he graduated from Marie Curie High School No. 2 in Gorzów Wielkopolski. He further studied Polish philology at the Adam Mickiewicz University in Poznań. He made his literary debut in 1964 in Poznań's literary club Od nowa, where he publicly read out one of his untitled poems. His first poem was published in 1966 (Wczasowstąpienie) in a literary magazine Pomorze. In 1968, he wrote Pęd pogoni, pęd ucieczki ("The Impulse to Pursue, the Impulse to Flee"), which one year later appeared in his first book of poetry Akt urodzenia ("The Birth Certificate"). He also published articles in an emigration weekly Wiadomości ("The News").

In the 1970s and 1980s, he was actively involved in the opposition movement against communist authorities of the Polish People's Republic. In 1971–1973 he worked at the editorial office of the Kraków-based Student magazine where he met many prominent members of the generation of the Polish New Wave (1968–1976) including Adam Zagajewski and Stanisław Barańczak. He was the signatory of Letter of 59, which was a reaction of Polish intellectuals against the undemocratic changes in the Constitution of the Polish People's Republic. As a direct consequence of this, his works were officially banned between 1976 and 1980. He collaborated with the Workers' Defense Committee; and in the period between 1977 and 1981, he published articles in Zapis magazine. In 1980, he took part in a hunger strike in St. Christopher's Church in Podkowa Leśna as an act of solidarity with the detained political dissidents Dariusz Kobzdej and Mirosław Chojecki. He published numerous texts and articles in opposition magazines such as Solidarności Wielkopolski ("Greater Poland Solidarity"), Obserwator Wielkopolski ("Greater Poland's Observer") and Bez Debitu ("Without Debit"). He also published his works in Zeszyty Literackie ("Literary Notebooks"). In 1988, he co-founded wydawnictwo a5 publishing house in Poznań, which specialized in the publication of poetry books. Since 1991, he has been running a publishing company together with his wife Krystyna. Nowadays, Krynicki is seen as one of the foremost representatives of contemporary Polish poetry alongside Adam Zagajewski and Ewa Lipska. In 2015, he became a member of the Polish Academy of Learning.

== Themes ==
His early poems contain a wealth of poetic devices and evoke gloomy imagery which presents reality as "a nightmare of chaos, emptiness and nothingness". The feeling of oppression and hostility characteristic of his works in this period can be interpreted in political, ethical and metaphysical aspects. Krynicki's approach to poetry at that time "concentrated on language in order to discern the falsehoods perpetrated in language by the totalitarian ideology. The goal was to escape from the lies of communist new-speak". His later works represent a radical shift from complex, Baroque poems to short, simple, miniature poems that evolved from "an imperative of internal self-perfection, cleansing the world of falsehood, and refusing to submit to various concepts of nothingness". Their aim was to inspire the reader to contemplate the world and to encourage empathy.

== Awards ==
- Zbigniew Herbert International Literary Award (2015)
- Gdynia Literary Prize for the translation of Paul Celan's Psalm and Other Poems (nomination) (2014)
- Stone Award at the City of Poetry Festival in Lublin (2008)
- Silver Medal for Merit to Culture - Gloria Artis (2005)
- Kraków Book of the Month Award for Kamień, szron (March 2005)
- Friedrich-Gundolf-Preis (2000)
- Kościelski Award (1976)

== Selected publications ==
- Pęd pogoni, pęd ucieczki ("The Impulse to Pursue, the Impulse to Flee"), Warsaw, 1968
- Akt urodzenia (The Birth Certificate), Poznań, 1969
- Organizm zbiorowy ("The Collective Organism"), Kraków, 1975
- Nasze życie rośnie. Wiersze ("Our Life is Growing: Poems"), Paris, 1978
- Niewiele więcej. Wiersze z notatnika 78-79 ("Not Much More. Poems From the Notebook 78-79"), Kraków, 1981
- Jeżeli w jakimś kraju ("If in Some Country"), Underground publisher S.i.s.n, 1982
- Ocalenie z nicości ("Salvation from Nothingness"), Kraków, 1983
- Niepodlegli nicości ("Independent of Nothingness: Selected and Revised Poems and Translations"), Warsaw, 1988
- Magnetyczny punkt. Wybrane wiersze i przekłady ("The Magnetic Point: Selected Poems and Translations"), Warsaw, 1996
- Nie szkodzi, 2002
- "Kamień, szron", Kraków, 2005
- Wiersze wybrane ("Selected Poems"), Kraków, 2009
- Przekreślony początek - selected poems, Wrocław, 2013
