= László F. Földényi =

Hungarian critic, essayist and art theorist

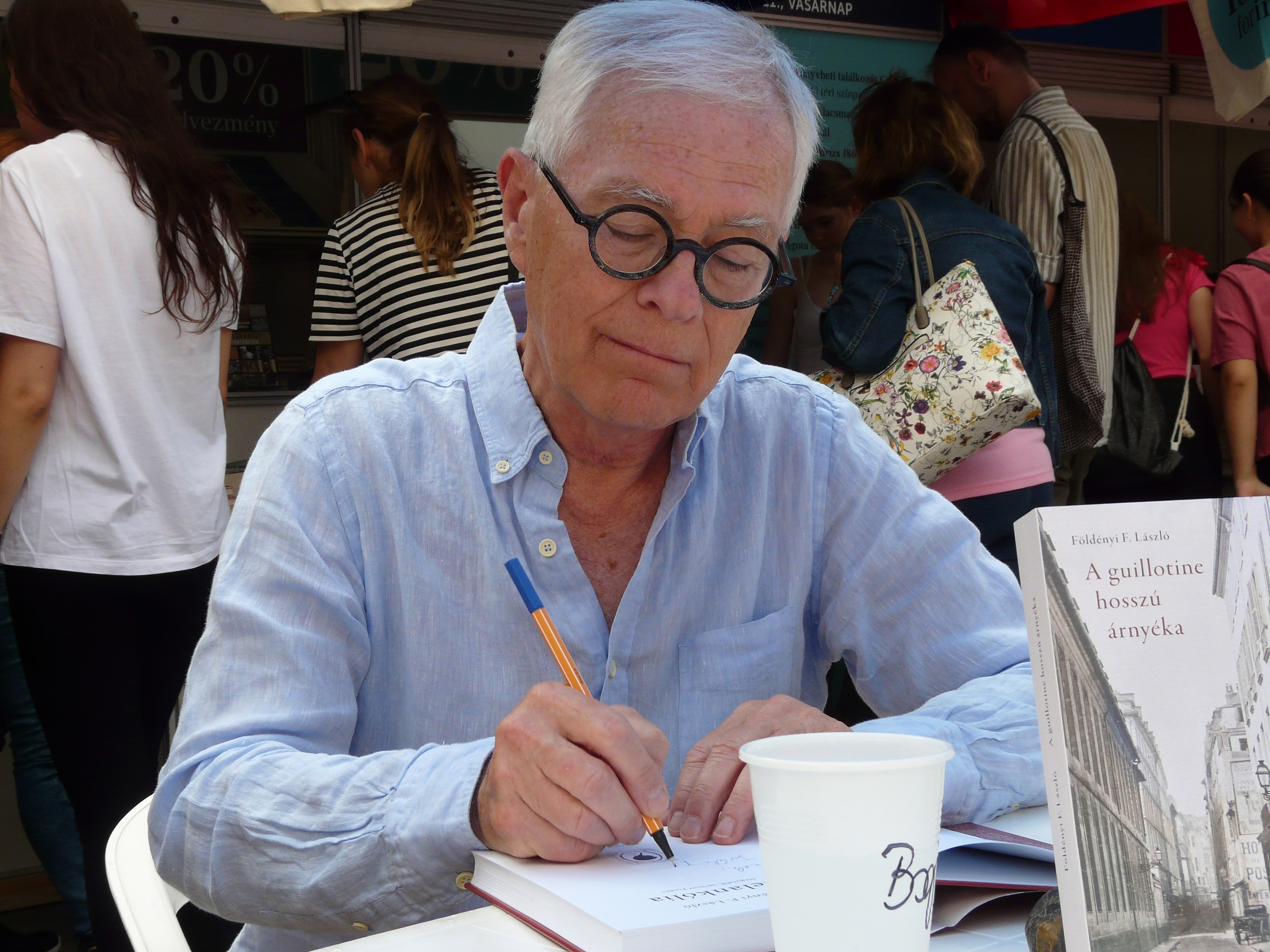
László Földényi F. Hungarian critic, essayist and art theorist signs a book. Ünnepi Könyvhét (bookfest), Budapest, June 2023.

László F. Földényi (born 19 April 1952 in Debrecen) is a Hungarian critic, essayist and art theorist. He lives in Budapest where he is Professor of Art Theory at the University of Theatre, Film and Television. He has been a member of the German Academy for Language and Literature since 2009.

== Works ==
Having published over 15 books, Földényi is a prolific writer. However only three collections of essays have been translated and published in English.

=== Melancholy ===
Melancholy, a cultural history of the concept, was published in Hungarian in 1984 and not translated into English until 2016. In an essay on melancholia, noted writer Péter Nádas suggests that as a practicing melancholic, Földényi has written a book that ‘provides a realization [about melancholy] similar to the one modern astronomy reaches about black holes’. Földényi posits that eminent artists are often melancholic as they are aware of their mortality.

=== Dostoyevsky Reads Hegel in Siberia and Bursts into Tears ===
Dostoyevsky Reads Hegel in Siberia and Bursts into Tears is a collection of Földényi’s essays spanning the two decades to 2015. The book is considered by some critics to be a critique with religious undertones of an overly rational Enlightenment tradition. Writing in The New Yorker, James Wood labelled the book's depiction of the Enlightenment a 'grievous caricature.' In spite of these criticisms, the essays can be considered a demonstration of the author's erudition and knowledge of intellectual history.

== Prizes ==
- Blue Salon Prize of the Literaturhaus Frankfurt (2002)
- Friedrich-Gundolf Prize of the German Academy of Language and Literature (2005)
- Leipzig Book Award for European Understanding (2020)
- Darmstadt Jury Literature Prize (2020)

== Bibliography ==
- Melancholy, translated by Tim Wilkinson, Yale University Press, 2016, ISBN 9780300167481
- Dostoyevsky Reads Hegel in Siberia and Bursts into Tears, translated by Ottilie Mulzet, Yale University Press, 2020, ISBN 9780300167498
- The Glance of the Medusa: The Physiognomy of Mysticism, translated by Jozefina Komporaly, University of Chicago Press, 2021, ISBN 9780857426086

=== Critical studies and reviews of Földényi's work ===
Dostoyevsky reads Hegel in Siberia and bursts into tears

- Wood, James (June 1, 2020). "In from the cold : a Hungarian essayist struggles against Enlightenment". The Critics. Books. The New Yorker. Vol. 96, no. 15. pp. 64–67.
