= The Pathseeker =

1977 novella by Imre Kertész

First edition (publ. Szépirodalmi) Cover art by István Engel Tevan

The Pathseeker (Hungarian: A nyomkereső) is a 1977 novella by the Hungarian writer Imre Kertész. Set in a series of unnamed postwar European locales, the story follows a government commissioner going on vacation to a resort town with his wife. The commissioner makes a detour from the planned route in order to investigate an old, unspecified injustice. He conducts an ominous investigation, visiting a local landmark and traveling to an isolated rural factory, eventually finding himself in an overgrown yet empty field.

Described as both puzzling and profound by critics, the novella has been noted for its bewildering lack of particulars about setting. Though the Holocaust is never mentioned by name, most reviews suggest the unspecified past injustice is tied to the genocide Kertész survived as a young man. The work has also been called a wry indictment of superficial tourism and its trivializing effect on history.

Three decades after its initial publication in Hungary, Melville House Publishing published an English translation by Tim Wilkinson.
