= Andrzej Franaszek =

Literary historian, critic, journalist and academic (born 1971))

- Born: 28 April 1971 (age 55); Kraków
- Occupations: Literary historian, literary critic, opinion journalist

Andrzej Wojciech Franaszek (born 28 April 1971) is a literary historian, literary critic, opinion journalist, screenwriter and academic teacher at the University of National Education Commission.

== Biography ==
Son of the technician Ryszard Franaszek and the civil servant Irena Gurgul. In the mid-1990s he joined the editorial team of Tygodnik Powszechny. From the second half of 1990s he published also in Gazeta Wyborcza. In 1995, he graduated with a master's degree in Polish philology from the Jagiellonian University. In 2004 and 2005 he was a member of the jury of the Nike Prize.

He performed on the television shows on TVP Kultura from 2009 to 2014. In 2010, he was employed at the Zbigniew Herbert Foundation. He was appointed secretary of the Zbigniew Herbert International Literary Award. In 2011 he obtained a doctoral degree at the Pedagogical University of Kraków upon dissertation Kategorie negatywne w literaturze polskiej po roku 1989. Rekonesans (Negative Categories in Polish Literature after 1989: A reconnaissance), supervised by Paweł Próchniak. In 2012 he was employed as a lecturer at the Pedagogical University of Kraków (later renamed University of National Education Commission). In 2018 he obtained habilitation.

He has written biograpgies of Zbigniew Herbert and Czesław Miłosz. He lives in Kraków. He devorced and has a daughter Antonina (born 2001).

== Books ==
- Ciemne źródło. O twórczości Zbigniewa Herberta. London: Puls. 1998. Second edition published by Znak, Kraków 2008, ISBN 978-83-240-0998-5.
- Przepustka z piekła. 44 szkice o literaturze i przygodach duszy. Kraków: Znak. 2010. ISBN 978-83-240-1398-2.
- Miłosz. Biografia. Kraków: Znak. 2011. ISBN 978-83-240-1614-3. Second edition published by Znak in 2022, ISBN 978-83-240-6886-9.
- Herbert. Biografia. Kraków: Znak. 2018. ISBN 978-83-240-5376-6. Volume 2, ISBN 978-83-240-6886-9.
- Gwiazda Piołun. Opowieści o poezji, podróżowaniu i przyjaźni. Kraków: Znak. 2022. ISBN 978-83-240-6425-0.

== Filmography (as screenwriter) ==
- Zwyczajna dobroć. O Jerzym Turowiczu (1998)
- Czarodziejska góra. Amerykański portret Czesława Miłosza (2000)
- Pokolenie ‘89 (2002)
- Profesor. O Leszku Kołakowskim (2005)
- Miłosz (2013)
- Nadal wracam. Portret Ryszarda Krynickiego (2016)
- Herbert. Barbarzyńca w ogrodzie (2021)

Source.

== Awards ==
- Kościelski Award (2011)
- Kraków Book of the Month Award for Miłosz. Biografia (May 2011)
- Nike Award – Audience Award for Miłosz. Biografia (2012)
- Kazimierz Wyka Award (2013)
- City of Kraków Award
