= Zygmunt Kubiak =

Polish writer and translator

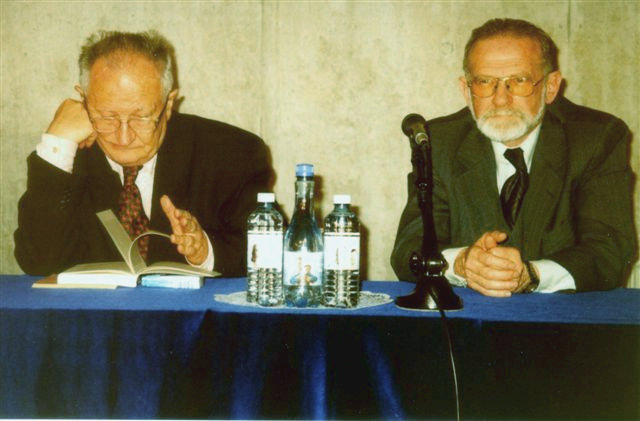
- Bronislaw Geremek and Zygmunt Kubiak in 18 November 2002.
- Born: 30 April 1929 Warsaw
- Died: 19 March 2004 (aged 74) Warsaw

Zygmunt Kubiak (30 April 1929, in Warsaw – 19 March 2004) was a Polish writer, essayist, translator, propagator of the antique culture, and professor at the University of Warsaw.

His book Mitologia Greków i Rzymian was shortlisted for the Nike Award in 1998.

He translated, among others, Virgil's Aeneid, St. Augustine's Confessions, and all poems of Constantine P. Cavafy.

In 1963 he received Kościelski Award.
