= Bolesław Taborski =

- Born: 7 May 1927; Toruń, Poland
- Died: 6 December 2010 (aged 83); London, England
- Occupations: Poet, translator
- Years active: c. 1957–2010

Bolesław Taborski (7 May 1927 – 6 December 2010) was a Polish poet, literary and drama theoretician, essayist, prolific translator of English and Polish, and a long serving BBC Polish Section editor and presenter. He chronicled and translated into English the work of some of the most notable Poles of the Post-war era of the 20th century, such as Lech Wałęsa, Jan Kott, and Jerzy Grotowski. His undoubted influence on modern theatre has yet to be assessed in detail. He had a personal friendship with Pope John Paul II which grew out of their shared interest in literature and the fact that Taborski was his literary translator into English.

== Early life ==
Taborski was born in Toruń. During the occupation of Poland in World War II, he was a member of the underground resistance both in Kraków and Warsaw where he took part in the uprising in 1944. In its aftermath he became a prisoner of war in Nazi Germany. After liberation he decided to stay in the West.

== Literary career ==
In 1946 he arrived in the United Kingdom. After graduating in English Literature and Drama at Bristol University, he joined the editorial board of the Polish magazine, Merkuriusz Polski Nowy. He was a member of the émigré poetic movement Kontynenty. For thirty years from 1959 he was on the staff of the BBC service to Poland, among other programmes, editing and presenting the Sunday arts broadcast, latterly known as The Arts by the Thames ("Sztuka nad Tamizą").

His extensive translation output includes translating the work of Graham Greene, Robert Graves, Philip Larkin and Robert Lowell into Polish. Probably his most influential translation into English was professor Jan Kott's Shakespeare our Contemporary, which inspired theatrical directors for a generation, people like, Peter Brook and Charles Marowitz. He also worked with Jerzy Grotowski to make him more accessible to an English speaking audience. Taborski was himself the author of several texts on theatre.

Taborski's translations into English also include the plays of Karol Woytyła, Pope John Paul II. He came to know Woytyła personally and travelled to Rome where they discussed literature for over a decade.

== Awards ==
He received the Koscielski Award in 1977. This was followed in 1988 by the Stanisław Ignacy Witkiewicz award.

== Personal life ==
Bolesław Taborski married Halina, a professor and latterly, chancellor of the Polish University Abroad; they had a daughter. He was a long-standing member of the SPP, Polish Writers Association and of the PEN club. He published a memoir of his time in the Warsaw uprising, Moje Powstanie - wtedy i teraz (1998).

== Death ==
Taborski died in London, aged 83. His ashes were taken to the Pantheon of the Armia Krajowa in the Powązki Military Cemetery.

== Selected bibliography ==
=== Main works ===
Poetry collections include:

- Czasy mijania (1957)
- Ziarna nocy (1958)
- Przestępując granicę (1962)
- Lekcja trwająca (1967)
- Głos milczenia (1969)
- Wybór wierszy (1973)
- Duet (1975)
- Sieć Słów (1976)
- For the Witnesses (1978)
- Obserwator cieni (1979)
- Miłość (1980)
- Cudza teraźniejszość (1983)
- Sztuka (1985)
- Cisza traw (1986)
- Życie i śmierć (1988)
- Dobranoc bezsensie (1991)
- Przetrwanie (1998)
- Poezje wybrane (1999)
- Drzwi gnieźnieńskie/Gniezno Door (2000)
- Ułamek istnienia (2002)
- Nowa Era Big Brothera i inne wiersze (2004)
- Plan B. (2007)
- Mój przyjaciel Szekspir (2007)
- Jedyne wyjście (2010)

=== Works related to Pope John Paul II ===
==== Translations of the plays of Karol Woytyła ====
- Job
- Jeremiah
- Our God's Brother
- The Jeweller's Shop
- Radiating Paternity

==== Biographical sketches and poems ====
- Wprost w moje serce uderza droga wszystkich: o Karolu Wojtyle Janie Pawle II – szkice, wspomnienia, wiersze (2005) ("Everyone's Journey Makes My Heart Jump: About Karol Woytyła, John Paul II – Sketches, Recollections, Poems")

=== Selected works on theatre ===
- Nowy teatr elżbietański (1967), "The New Elizabethan Theatre"
- Polish Plays in English Translations - A Bibliography (1968)
- Byron and the Theatre (1972)
- Karola Wojtyły dramaturgia wnętrza (1989)
- Mój przyjaciel Szekspir (2007) ("My friend Shakespeare")
