= Shulamit Volkov =

Shulamit Volkov (Hebrew: שולמית וולקוב; born October 12, 1942) is an Israeli historian, specializing in the history of German Jews and anti-Semitism. She is professor emerita for modern European history at Tel Aviv University.

== Biography ==
She was born in Tel Aviv, studied at the Hebrew University of Jerusalem in history and philosophy (1963–1964) and then at the University of California, Berkeley (1964–1972), where she was awarded the degree of B.A. (1966), M.A. (1967) and Ph.D. (1972).

== Books ==
- The Rise of popular Antimodernism in Germany. The Urban Master Artisans,1873–1896, Princeton Univ. Press, Princeton N.J. 1978
- Jüdisches Leben und Antisemitismus im 19. und 20. Jahrhundert, Verlag C.H.Beck, München 1990.
  - second edition, under the title Antisemitismus als Kultureller Code, Becksche Reihe, Beck Verlag, Munich 2000
- Unity and Liberty in Germany: from Napoleon to Bismarck, [Hebrew] (איחוד וחירות בגרמניה – מנפוליאון עד ביסמרק) Tel Aviv 1997
- Die Juden in Deutschland 1780–1918, vol. 16 of the Enzyklopädie deutscher Geschichte, edited by Lothar Gall a.o., Oldenbourg Verlag, München 1994. (Second edition, 1999).
  - expanded and edited Hebrew version: Unity and Assimilation: German Jews 1780-1933) (בין ייחוד לטמיעה: יהודי גרמניה 1780-1918), The Open University 2003
- Das Juedische Projekt der Moderne, Becksche Reihe, Beck Verlag, Munich 2001.
- The Magic Circle. Jews, Antisemites, and Other Germans,[Hebrew] (במעגל המכושף: יהודים, אנטישמים וגרמנים אחרים) Am Oved, Tel Aviv 2002
  - revised English version, Germans, Jews, and Antisemites. Trials in Emancipation, Cambridge University Press. 2006
- 2012: Walther Rathenau: Weimar's Fallen Statesman
  - 2014: [Hebrew] ולטר רתנאו – טרגדיה יהודית גרמנית
- 2022: גרמניה ויהודיה - היסטוריה אחרת (translated by Nir Raczkowski from Die Juden in Deutschland 1780–1918. The book contains an alternative title in English: German History through Jewish Eyes. Another History from the Eighteenth Century to the Present)

She is also an editor of several monographs.

== Awards and recognition ==
- 1998: Friedrich-Gundolf-Preis. From citation: "... whose work shows that the communication of German culture today consists first and foremost in the effort to find the truth, even if it is bitter".
- 2006: member of the Israel Academy of Sciences and Humanities
- 2014: honorary doctorate from the Ben-Gurion University of the Negev
