= Miklós Szentkuthy =

Hungarian writer, translator, and professor

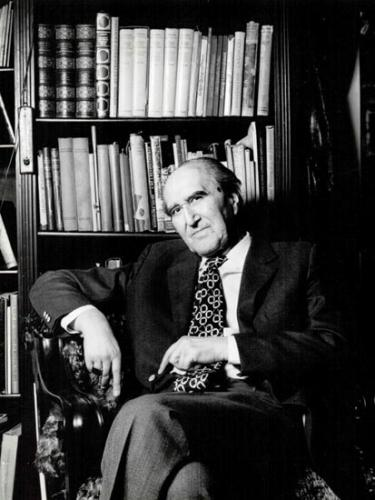
- (Photo: László Csigó)
- Born: Miklós Pfisterer; 2 June 1908
- Died: 18 July 1988 (aged 80)
- Occupation: writer
- Known for: one of the major innovative Hungarian novelists of the 20th century
- Notable work: Prae, St. Orpheus Breviary, Chapter on Love, Towards the One and Only Metaphor
- Awards: Kossuth Prize

Miklós Szentkuthy (born Miklós Pfisterer; 2 June 1908 – 18 July 1988) was one of the most prolific Hungarian writers of the 20th century. His body of work comprises numerous novels, essays, translations, and an extensive diary covering the years 1930 to 1988. As the author of notable works such as Prae, the epic 10-volume St. Orpheus Breviary, Chapter on Love and Towards the One and Only Metaphor, he is regarded as one of the most significant Hungarian writers of the 20th century. His works have been translated into English, French, Spanish, Italian, Portuguese, Romanian, Slovak, and Turkish.

== Style ==
Szentkuthy composed an oeuvre both imposing and complex, centered on the conflict between art and life, or the aspiration for holiness and eroticism. It includes fictionalized biographies of musicians such as Handel, Haydn, and Mozart, artists like Dürer and Brunelleschi, writers Goethe and Cicero, and historical figures Superbus and Luther, etc., written in the form of collections of fragments or notes with a wealth of audacious metaphors. For the experimental side and erudite aspect of his work, he is sometimes compared to the Argentine writer Jorge Luis Borges. However, in My Career, Szentkuthy stated that he "never, in any shape or form, considered Prae to be a work that belonged to an avant-garde. [...] When people pigeonholed the book with ‘surrealism’ and other ‘isms’ I felt a bit like Molière's Bourgeois Gentilhomme, who on being taught the difference between poetry and prose, exclaims in astonishment, 'Good Heavens! For more than forty years I have been speaking prose without knowing it!' It was also on the basis of an honorable misunderstanding of Prae that I was invited to what was catalogued as the avant-garde “European School” – perhaps more to address them as a speaker than a proper member – and there I delivered talks on Dickens, Shakespeare, and a host of old classics, amply demonstrating that what the school fondly imagined were revolutionary innovations had also played a part, to a greater or lesser extent (better too), in the history of the arts."

== Works ==
Szentkuthy was only 25 when he published his debut novel Prae (1934), which he intended to be a panoramic description of European culture of the twenties. Containing little plot or dialogue, the novel consists mostly of philosophical reflections and descriptions of modern interiors. One of the formal innovations of Prae lies in the fragmentary structure of the text. The novel consists of numerous reflections, descriptions, and scenes that are only loosely connected. While in 1934 the novel was received with indifference, today it is recognised as the first fully modernist Hungarian novel.

Szentkuthy's second book, Towards the One and Only Metaphor (1935), is a collection of short diary-like epigrams and reflections; it was intended as a literary experiment to follow the thinking self through the most delicate thoughts and impressions without imposing any direction on it. His next novel, Chapter on Love (1936), marks a shift in his style — the quasi-scientific language of Prae gives way to a baroque prose typical of his later works.

After Chapter on Love, Szentkuthy developed an outline for his St. Orpheus's Breviary, a grandiose cycle of historical novels. Drawing on the tradition of great Encyclopaedic narratives such as Balzac's The Human Comedy and Zola's Rougon-Macquart cycle, Szentkuthy aimed at depicting the totality of two thousand years of European culture. While there are clear parallels between this monumental work and Huysmans, Musil, and Robert Burton, and in ways it is parodic of St. Augustine, Zéno Bianu observed that its method is in part based on Karl Barth's exegetical work. "In 1938, Szentkuthy read the Römerbrief of the famous Protestant exegete Karl Barth, a commentary that is based on an analysis, phrase by phrase, even word by word, of the Epistle to the Romans. Literally enchanted by the effectiveness of this method – 'where, in his words, every epithet puts imagination in motion' – he decided to apply it on the spot to Casanova, which he had just annotated with gusto a German edition in six large volumes." In the years 1939–1942, Szentkuthy published the first six parts of the series: Marginalia on Casanova (1939), Black Renaissance (1939), Escorial (1940), Europa Minor (1941), Cynthia (1941), and Confession and Puppet Show (1942). In the period 1945–1972, due to Communist rule in Hungary, Szentkuthy could not continue Orpheus. Instead he wrote a series of pseudo-biographical novels on Mozart (1957), Haydn (1959), Goethe (1962), Dürer (1966), and Handel (1967) in which he mixed historical facts with elements of fiction and autobiography. He also wrote several historical novels during this time: Liberated Jerusalem, Chronicle Burgonde, Byzance, Wittenberg, in which he put, as he himself said, several micro-Orpheus’.

In 1972 Szentkuthy resumed the Orpheus cycle. Publication of the seventh volume, The Second Life of Sylvester II, turned out to be a success and marked the beginning of Szentkuthy's renaissance. His translation of Joyce's Ulysses (1974) and the second edition of Prae (1980) was followed by the republication of his early works, which brought him widespread recognition in some European countries. Thereafter he wrote two more parts of the Orpheus cycle, Canonized Desperation (1974), and Bloody Donkey (1984). In 1988 he was awarded the Kossuth Prize and the last book that appeared in his lifetime was Frivolities and Confessions (1988), a series of interviews conducted by Lóránt Kabdebó in 1983.

== Death ==
Szentkuthy died in 1988, leaving the final part of Orpheus unfinished. Some fragments of it were published posthumously as In the Footsteps of Eurydice (1993).

== Legacy ==
In the twenty-first century, Szentkuthy is generally acknowledged as one of the major innovative Hungarian novelists of the 20th century. His influence has extended to many contemporary authors, such as Péter Esterházy and Péter Nádas, while some critics consider him a forerunner of postmodernism. At the same time, Szentkuthy's oeuvre remains largely unknown to the wider English-speaking public, though a recent English translation and laudatory reviews in the Guardian, the Los Angeles Review of Books, and Tropes of Tenth Street have considerably remedied that. Additionally, in December 2013, Szentkuthy's Marginalia on Casanova was chosen by Nicholas Lezard of The Guardian as one of the best books of the year. In Europe, Szentkuthy's work has received more widespread and consistent attention, and at least one or more of his works have been translated annually since 1990. Yet, with only one monograph (József J. Fekete, P.O.S.T) and two doctoral theses devoted to his works, he is one of the most under-researched Hungarian writers, but some critics in France and elsewhere regard him to be as significant as Marcel Proust.

The Petőfi Literary Museum in Budapest has an archive of Szentkuthy's manuscripts which contain unpublished work, including approximately 80–100,000 pages of a sealed diary (1930s–1988). The first part of the diary (1930s–1947) opened to researchers in 2013, the 25th anniversary of his death, and the second part (1948–1988) will be opened in 2038. Szentkuthy professed that the diary is his 'real' work, hence the opening of it should prove illuminating.

== Awards and honors ==
- Baumgarten Prize (1948)
- Award of Excellence of the Publisher Europa (March 21, 1975 – for the translation of Ulysses)
- Attila József Prize (1977)
- Order of Labor Gold Degree (1978 – for his remarkable life-work, on the occ. of his 70th birthday)
- Füst Milán Prize (1982)
- Déry Tibor Prize (1984)
- Award of Excellence from the Publisher Magvető (May 15, 1985 – for Vol. IV of St. Orpheus Breviary, Bloody Donkey)
- Kossuth Prize (April 4, 1988)
- Award of Excellence from Hungarian Radio (June 28, 1988 – for the tr. of Ulysses)
- Elected to be included in the Digitális Irodalmi Akadémia (2013)

== Selected bibliography ==
=== Novels and novel-essays ===
- Prae (1934; 1980; 2004)
  - Prae: Vol. 1, trans. Tim Wilkinson (Contra Mundum Press, 2014)
  - Prae: Vol. 2, trans. Erika Mihálycsa (Contra Mundum Press, 2022)
- Fejezet a szerelemről (1936; 1984). Chapter on Love, trans. Erika Mihálycsa (Contra Mundum Press, 2020)
- Fekete Orpheus-füzetek (1939–1942). Black Orpheus Booklets; later included in St. Orpheus Breviary
  - 1. Széljegyzetek Casanovához (1939; 2008). Marginalia on Casanova, trans. Tim Wilkinson (Contra Mundum Press, 2012)
  - 2. Fekete Reneszánsz (1939). Black Renaissance, trans. Tim Wilkinson (Contra Mundum Press, 2018)
  - 3. Eszkoriál (1940)
  - 4. Europa minor (1941)
  - 5. Cynthia (1941)
  - 6. Vallomás és bábjáték (1942). Confession and Puppet Show
- Divertimento. Változatok Wolfgang Amadeus Mozart életére (1957; 1976; 1998; 2006). Variations on the Life of W. A. Mozart
- Doktor Haydn (1959; 1979; 2009)
- Burgundi krónika (1959; 1978). Burgundy Chronicle
- Hitvita és nászinduló: Wittenberg, Bizánc (1960). Religious Debate and Wedding March: Wittenberg and Byzantium
- Arc és álarc (1962; 1982). Face and Mask
- Megszabadított Jeruzsálem (1965). Jerusalem Liberated
- Saturnus fia (1966; 1989). Son of Saturn; novel about Albrecht Dürer
- Angyali Gigi (1966). Angelic Gigi; novella
- Händel (1967; 1975).
- Meghatározások és szerepek (1969). Definitions and Roles
- II Szilveszter második élete (1972). The Second Life of Sylvester II
- Szent Orpheus breviáriuma (1973–1984). St. Orpheus Breviary:
  - Vol. 1 (1973) contains the first four volumes of Black Orpheus Booklets (1. Marginalia on Casanova, 2. Black Renaissance, 3. Eszkoriál, and 4. Europa minor)
  - Vol. 2 (1973) contains two more volumes of Black Orpheus Booklets (5. Cynthia, 6. Confession and Puppet Show) and 7. The Second Life of Silvester II
  - Vol. 3 (1974) contains 8. Kanonizált kétségbeesés [Canonized Desperation]
  - Vol. 4 (1984) contains 9. Véres szamár [Bloody Donkey]
- Szárnyatlan oltárok: Burgundi krónika, Wittenberg (1978). Wingless Altars: Burgundy Chronicle and Wittenberg
- Iniciálék és ámenek (1987). Initials and Amens, collection of shorter prose

=== Posthumous editions ===
- Cicero vándorévei (1990)
- Barokk Róbert (1991; 2002). Baroque Robert
- Saint Orpheus's Breviary Vol. 5 (1993) contains 10. Euridiké nyomán [In the Footsteps of Eurydice]
- Bianca Lanza di Casalanza (1994)
- Nárcisszus tükre (written in 1933, first published in 1995). Narcissus’ Mirror
- Bezárult Európa (2000). Europe Is Closed
- Pendragon és XIII. Apolló (written 1946–1947, publ. 2008). Pendragon and Apollo XIII

=== Essays ===
- Maupassant egy mai író szemével (1968). Maupassant in a Contemporary Writer's Eyes
- Meghatározások és szerepek (Magvető, 1969)
- Múzsák testamentuma (1985). Testament of the Muses

=== Short stories and other writings ===
- Iniciálék és ámenek (Szépirodalmi, 1987).

=== Diary and memoirs ===
- Az egyetlen metafora felé (1935, 1985). Towards the One and Only Metaphor, trans. Tim Wilkinson (Contra Mundum Press, 2013)
- Frivolitások és hitvallások (1988). Frivolities & Confessions
- Ágoston olvasás közben (1993). While Reading Augustine
- Harmonikus tépett lélek (1994). A Harmonious Ripped Soul
- Az alázat kalendáriuma (1998). The Almanac of Humility
- Fájdalmok és titkok játéka (2001). The Play of Pains and Secrets
- Az élet faggatottja (beszélgetések, riportok, interjúk Sz.M.-sal) (2006). An Interrogator of Life: Conversations, Reports, and Interviews with Miklós Szenkuthy

=== Other ===
- Reakitás és irrealitás viszonya Ben Jonson klasszikus naturalizmusában [The Relationship of Reality to Unreality in the Classical Naturalism of Ben Jonson’]; doctoral thesis (1931)
- Égő katedra (Hamvas Intézet, 2001)
- Örök közelség, ezer emlék (Szentkuthy Miklós válogatott dedikációi) [Immortal Proximity, a Thousand Memories (selected dedications by Miklós Szenkuthy] (2007)
- Szentkuthy Miklós válogatott levelezése [Selected Correspondence of Miklós Szenkuthy] (2008)
- Titkok játéka (P.I.M., 2009)

=== Translations by Szentkuthy into Hungarian ===
- Az angol irodalom kincsesháza (Budapest: Athenaeum, 1942) Szerk: Halász Gábor, Sz.M. ford: John Lyly, A szerelem veszélyei; Philip Sidney, A szerelem; John Donne, A halálról, és: Van-e Isten?; Sir Thomas Browne, Önmagáról [About Himself—an excerpt from Religio Medici]; John Milton, Az „Areopagiticá”-ból
- Jonathan Swift, Gulliver utazásai (Szépirodalmi, 1952)
- Álszentek cselekedetei (Szépirodalmi, 1953)
- Howard Fast, Spartacus (Szépirodalmi, 1953)
- Howard Fast, Amerikai legenda (Szépirodalmi, 1954)
- Charles Dickens, Twist Olivér (Új Magyar Könyvkiadó, 1955)
- Halldór Laxness, Független emberek (Új Magyar Könyvkiadó, 1955)
- Henry Lawson, A batyu románca (Új Magyar Könyvkiadó, 1956)
- Békedíjas írók (Új Magyar kiadó,1956)
- Mark Twain, Az egymillió fontos bankjegy (Európa, 1957)
- Mark Twain, Emberevés a vonaton (Magvető, 1966)
- Hagyomány és egyéniség (1967)
- Autóbusz és iguána (Európa, 1968)
- Mark Twain, Mennyei utazás (Európa, 1970)
- James Joyce, Ulysses (Európa, 1974)
- Mark Twain, Megszelídítem a kerékpárt (Európa, 1980)
- Az erőd bevétele (Zrínyi kiadó, Bp. 1980). Válogatás a világirodalom legjobb katona-elbeszéléseiből, 1800–1945
- Henry Lawson, Élhetetlen szerelmesek (Európa, 1984)
- Poe és követői. Rémisztő történetek (Lazi kiadó, Szeged, 2002)
- Odüsszeusztól Ulyssesig (Kriterion, Kolozsvár, 2006)

=== Videos ===
- András Jeles, Arc és álarc (Budapest, 1986). A video interview conducted by Pál Réz. This is an excerpt from the original 12–15 hours of footage shot by Jeles. Arc és álarc aired on Hungarian TV, Channel No. 1, in 1991.
- TV Portrait-film (1983)

=== Archive ===
The Miklós Szentkuthy Foundation Archive, held by the Petőfi Literary Museum, contains:

- a 1986 video interview (the raw material comprises 12–15 hours),
- a collection of photographs related to Szentkuthy's life (thousands of photos from his grandparents' generation to the death of the writer),
- thousands of bibliographical items: book reviews, critiques, etc. (from 1931 to the present day),
- approx. 200 hours of audio cassettes (1968–present) and VHS tapes (1982 to the present day).
