= Janina Abramowska =

Literary historian and theorist (born 1933)

- Born: 29 August 1933 (age 93); Ostrów Mazowiecka
- Occupations: Literary historian and theorist
- Employer: Adam Mickiewicz University in Poznań

Academic background
- Education: Adam Mickiewicz University in Poznań
- Doctoral advisor: Jerzy Ziomek

Janina Teresa Abramowska (born 29 August 1933) is a literary historian and theorist.

== Biography ==
In 1955 she graduated from the Adam Mickiewicz University in Poznań. From 1955 to 1958 she worked at the Institute of Literary Research of the Polish Academy of Sciences. In 1962 she obtained doctorate upon dissertation “Odprawa posłów greckich” Jana Kochanowskiego wobec tragedii renesansowej, supervised by Jerzy Ziomek (dissertation on The Dismissal of the Greek Envoys). Also in 1962 she joined Polish United Workers' Party. In 1974 she obtained habilitation. From 1961 she worked at the Adam Mickiewicz University in Poznań. From 1993 to 2001 she was a member of the scientific council of the Institute of Literary Research of the Polish Academy of Sciences. She retired in 2003.

She supervised ten doctoral dissertations; including the doctoral thesis of Przemysław Czapliński (1992), Piotr Śliwiński (1995), Zbigniew Kopeć (1998) and Katarzyna Kuczyńska-Koschany (2001). From 1952 to 1968 she was married to Jerzy Kułtuniak.

== Books ==
- Odprawa posłów greckich Jana Kochanowskiego wobec tragedii renesansowej. Poznań. 1963.
- Ład i fortuna. O tragedii renesansowej w Polsce. Wrocław: Polska Akademia Nauk, Instytut Badań Literackich. 1974.
- Jan Kochanowski. Poznań: Rebis. 1994.
- Powtórzenia i wybory. Studia z tematologii i poetyki historycznej. Poznań: Rebis. 1995.
- Rekonstrukcje i konstrukcje. Studia literackie. Poznań: Wydawnictwo „Poznańskie Studia Polonistyczne”. 2003.
- Pisarze w zwierzyńcu. Wydawnictwo Poznańskie. 2010. ISBN 978-83-7177-620-5.

== Awards ==
- Odznaka honorowa „Za Zasługi w Rozwoju Województwa Poznańskiego” (1979)
- Gold Cross of Merit (1982)
- Medal of the Commission of National Education (1991)
- Knight's Cross of the Order of Polonia Restituta (1993)

== Bibliography ==
- Śliwiński, Piotr (2000). "Abramowska Janina". Literatura XX wieku. Przewodnik encyklopedyczny. Vol. 1 (A–O). Warszawa: Wydawnictwo Naukowe PWN. pp. 1–2. ISBN 83-01-13028-8.
