= Mieczysław Kotlarczyk =

Polish actor and director (1908–1978)

- Born: 6 June 1908; Poland
- Died: 21 February 1978 (aged 69); Poland
- Occupation: Actor
- Years active: 1941-1967
- Spouse: Zofia Opidowicz

Mieczysław Kotlarczyk (1908–1978) was a Polish actor, theatre director and literary critic.

Kotlarczyk studied Polish Philology at the Jagiellonian University (Kraków), graduating with Master's (1931) and Doctorate (1936) degrees in philosophy. Kotlarczyk was the theatre mentor of Karol Wojtyła (future Pope John Paul II). He was active in the underground theatre in occupied Poland, and founder of the underground Teatr Rapsodyczny in Kraków.

In 1975 he signed the Letter of 59.
