= Jerzy Markuszewski =

Polish theatre director (1930–2007)

Jerzy Markuszewski (16 December 1930 – 16 October 2007) was a Polish theater director and anti-Communist dissident. Born in Warsaw, Markuszewski was one of the co-signers of Letter of 59, which protested the altering of the Constitution of the People's Republic of Poland in 1975.

Markuszewski died in Warsaw, Poland, on 16 October 2007.
