= Nora Iuga =

Romanian poet, writer and translator

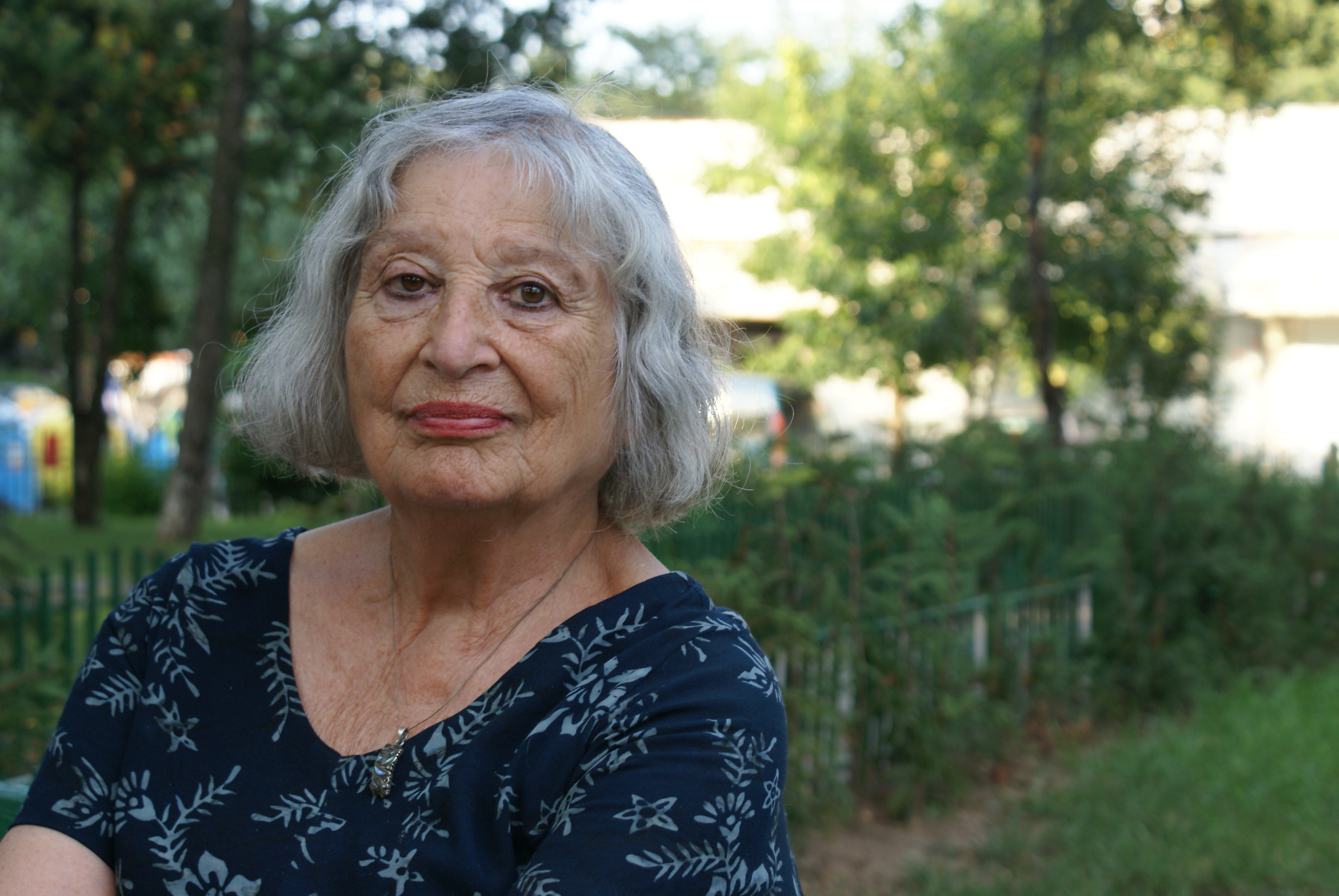
- Born: January 4, 1931 (age 95); Bucharest, Romania
- Occupation: Author
- Writing career
- Notable awards: Friedrich-Gundolf-Preis

Nora Iuga (born 4 January 1931) is a Romanian poet, writer and translator.

Iuga was born in Bucharest, Romania on 4 January 1931. As well as being a writer, Iuga has also worked as a journalist, foreign language assistant, and editor.

Her first collection of poems was published in 1968 and was called Vina nu e a mea (It Is Not My Fault). She was censored between 1971 and 1978 by the communist government in Romania after the publication of her second collection off poems, Captivitatea cercului (Trapped in a Circle).

The first English translation of her work, a collection of poems called The Hunchbacks’ Bus, was published in 2016. Several of her works have also been translated into German. English translations of her work were included in the anthology Something is still present and isn't, of what's gone.

She was awarded with a grant from the Akademie Schloss Solitude in 2003 and won the Friedrich-Gundolf-Preis in 2007.
