= Viktor Žmegač =

Croatian musicologist and scholar (1929–2022)

Viktor Žmegač (21 March 1929 – 20 July 2022) was a Croatian musicologist and scholar. He authored a number of books, articles and essays in the areas of cultural history, literary theory, musicology, art history, and German studies.

Žmegač was born in Slatina on 21 March 1929. After finishing elementary school in his home town he went on to attend gymnasiums in Virovitica and Osijek. He then enrolled at the University of Zagreb Faculty of Philosophy and earned a double major degree in Yugoslav and German studies. He also studied musicology and German studies in University of Göttingen. He earned a doctorate in 1959 and later spent almost 30 years as a tenured university professor teaching German literature at the Faculty of Humanities and Social Sciences in Zagreb, from 1971 until his retirement in 1999. He was made professor emeritus in 2002.

Žmegač was a full member of the Croatian Academy of Sciences and Arts (HAZU) and member of the Saxonian Academy of Sciences and Academia Europaea. He was also awarded a number of Croatian and international prizes for his works, including the Friedrich-Gundolf-Preis (1987), Herder Prize (1993), the Humboldt Prize (1993) and the Vladimir Nazor Award for Life Achievement in Literature (2003). Žmegač died in Zagreb on 20 July 2022, at the age of 93.

== Selected works ==
- Od Bacha do Bauhausa (2006)
- Majstori europske glazbe (2009)
- Prošlost i budućnost 20. stoljeća (2010)
