= Marian Stala =

Polish literary critic and historian (born 1952)

- Born: 13 September 1952 (age 73); Tarnobrzeg
- Occupations: Literary critic, historian

Marian Stala (born 13 September 1952) is a literary critic, historian and columnist, professor at Jagiellonian University.

== Biography ==
The son of Władysława Stala and Maria née Krzos, accountants. He attended high school in Tarnobrzeg and passed matura in 1971. He enrolled at the Jagiellonian University to study Polish philology. He graduated with a master's degree in 1976 and in that same year started working as an assistant at the Jagiellonian University. He used pen names Konrad Lichtenberg and Władysław Szreniawa-Rzecki. Between 1982 and 1985 he was a literary director at the Juliusz Słowacki Theatre in Kraków. His research focused at Young Poland poetry. In 1983 he earned doctorate upon thesis Metaforyzacja w liryce Młodej Polski. Teoria i praktyka supervised by Maria Podraza-Kwiatkowska. In 1983–89 he co-edited the spoken magazine “NaGłos”.

He collaborated with underground magazines: Arka (1984–1989; also signed by Jacek Krzos), Puls (1986; also signed by Ryszard Nienaski), Brulion (1987–1990; also signed by Jacek Krzos; here in 1989 a series of reviews entitled Poezja i wierszomania). In 1987, he became a regular contributor to Tygodnik Powszechny, where he began publishing reviews and articles; in 1998–2000, he headed the culture section.

In 1995 he obtained habilitation at the Jagiellonian University upon the thesis Pejzaż człowieka. Młodopolskie myśli i wyobrażenia o duszy, duchu i ciele. From 2006 until 2008 he was a member of Nike Award jury.

He was a head of the Department of the History of Positivist and Young Poland Literature at the Faculty of Polish Studies, Jagiellonian University. From 2013, he has been a member of the Centralna Komisja do Spraw Stopni i Tytułów.

== Books ==
- Metafora w liryce Młodej Polski. Warszawa. 1988. ISBN 83-01-08013-2.
- Chwile pewności. Kraków. 1991. ISBN 83-7006-103-6.
- Pejzaż człowieka. Kraków. 1994. ISBN 83-85845-10-0.
- Druga strona – notatki o poezji współczesnej. Kraków. 1997. ISBN 83-7006-649-6.
- Trzy nieskończoności: o poezji Adama Mickiewicza, Bolesława Leśmiana i Czesława Miłosza. Kraków. 2001. ISBN 83-08-03170-6.
- Przeszukiwanie czasu. Kraków. 2004. ISBN 83-08-03658-9.
- Niepojęte: Jest. Wrocław. 2011. ISBN 978-83-62006-15-1.
- Jarosław, Donald i inne chłopaki. Felietony z „Tygodnika Powszechnego”. Kraków. 2012. ISBN 97883-242-1729-8.
- Blisko wiersza. 30 interpretacji. Kraków. 2013. ISBN 978-83-240-2069-0.

== Accolades ==
- Kościelski Award (1992)
- Gold Cross of Merit (1998)
- Kazimierz Wyka Award (1998)
- Kraków Book of the Month Award for the book Blisko wiersza. 30 interpretacji (November 2013)
