= Jan Błoński =

Polish historian and literary critic (1931–2009)

- Front cover of Biedni Polacy patrzą na getto (the Misfortunate Poles look at the Ghetto) by Jan Błoński, ISBN 978-83-08-042-01-4
- Born: 15 January 1931; Warsaw, Poland
- Died: 10 February 2009 (aged 78); Kraków
- Citizenship: Polish
- Occupations: Writer, academic

Jan Błoński (15 January 1931 – 10 February 2009) was a Polish historian, literary critic, publicist and translator. He was a leading representative of the Kraków school of literary criticism, which wielded significant influence in postwar Poland.

Professor of the Jagiellonian University, Błoński was habilitated there for the work entitled Mikołaj Sęp Szarzyński and the beginnings of the Polish Baroque. He was the literary editor for the publication of Witold Gombrowicz's collected works in 1986–88 through Wydawnictwo Literackie. He was also the Fellow of Collegium Invisibile. In 1996–2001 he served as juror for the Nike Literary Award.

== Biography ==
Jan Błoński was born in Warsaw in 1931, the son of Józef Błoński and Jadwiga née Lewandowska. During the occupation of Poland by Nazi Germany, Błoński witnessed the liquidation of the Warsaw Ghetto in 1942; a Jewish boy who had escaped ran into him on the street, but he didn't help. This episode of passive complicity will breed a deep sense of guilt for years and inspire "Biedni Polacy patrzą na getto" (the Poor Poles look at the Ghetto; 1987), which remains among his most renowned publications. His book would pioneer the idea that Polish people had acted as observers and therefore "shared responsibility", igniting a very controversial debate. Błoński finished his studies in Polonistics at the Jagiellonian University in 1952 during the Stalinist era in Poland.

Błoński obtained a position with the Institute of Literary Studies of the Polish Academy of Sciences in 1959–62 (after the Polish October). From 1970 he was employed at the Jagiellonian University. He was a vice-rector for didactic affairs (1981–84), director of the Institute of Polish Studies (1988–91), director of the Department of the Theatre (1977–1980) and the Department of the 20th Century Polish Literature (1995–97). As professor, he also lectured Polish literature at the University of Sorbonne, the University of Clermont-Ferrand and the Paris University IV. He died on 10 February 2009 in Kraków.

== Books ==
- Poezja K. I. Gałczyńskiego 1945–1953. 1954.
- Poeci i inni. 1956.
- Zmiana warty. 1961.
- Widzieć jasno w zachwyceniu: szkic literacki o twórczości Prousta. 1965.
- Stanisław Ignacy Witkiewicz jako dramaturg. 1973.
- Odmarsz. 1978.
- Romans z tekstem. 1981.
- Samuel Beckett. 1982.
- Kilka myśli co nie nowe. 1985.
- Forma, śmiech i rzeczy ostateczne: studia o Gombrowiczu. 1994.
- Od Stasia do Witkacego. 1997.
- Mieszaniny. 2001.
- Witkacy sztukmistrz, filozof, estetyk. 2001.
- Wszystko co literackie. 2001.
- Mikołaj Sęp Szarzyński a początki polskiego baroku. 2001.
- Między literaturą a światem. 2003.
- Witkacy na zawsze. 2003.
- Listy 1963–1996. 2004.
- Wyspiański wielokrotnie. 2007.
- Lektury użyteczne. 2008.
- Biedni Polacy patrza̜ na getto. 2008.
- Gospodarstwo krytyka: teksty rozproszone. 2010.
- Błoński przekorny: dziennik, wywiady. 2011.
- Miłosz jak świat. 2011.
- Język właściwie użyty. Szkice o poezji polskiej drugiej połowy XX wieku. 2019.

== Awards ==
In 1968 he received Kościelski Award. In 1981 he received Kazimierz Wyka Award. In November 1995 he was awarded the Kraków Book of the Month Award for Wszystkie sztuki Sławomira Mrożka, the collected works of Sławomir Mrożek, his long-time friend from the Stalinist period.
