= Wojciech Skalmowski =

Polish writer (1933–2008)

Jan Wojciech Skalmowski (pseud. Maciej Broński, M. Broński, Piotr Meynert; 24 June 1933, in Poznań – 18 July 2008, in Brussels), was a Polish scholar, orientalist, essayist, writer, journalist and literary critic.
