= Jerzy Jarzębski =

Polish literary historian and critic

Jerzy Jarzębski (August 22, 1947 – February 25, 2024) was a Polish literary historian and critic, a long time professor at the Jagiellonian University.

He is acclaimed for his research on Witold Gombrowicz, Bruno Schulz, Stanisław Lem, as well as on new names, such as Andrzej Kuśniewicz, Marek Hłasko and Olga Tokarczuk, among other works.

He was born in Bytom.

In 1965 he began his studies at the Jagiellonian University. In 1971 he started his work at the university as a teaching assistant, obtained his habilitation in 1993, and in 1998 he obtained the title of professor. During 2005-2012 he was deputy dean of the Faculty of Polish Studies of the university. He was also a visiting professor at a number of universities all over the world. His works were translated into 20 languages.

== Books ==
- Gra w Gombrowicza (1982)
- Powieść jako autokreacja (1984)
- Zufall und Ordnung. Zum Werk Stanislaw Lems (1986)
- W Polsce, czyli wszędzie. Studia o polskiej prozie współczesnej (1992)
- Apetyt na Przemianę. Notatki o prozie współczesnej (1997)
- Pożegnanie z emigracją. O powojennej prozie polskiej (1998)
- Schulz (2000)
- Podglądanie Gombrowicza (2000)
- Wszechświat Lema (2002)
- Słownik schulzowski (wraz z Włodzimierzem Boleckim i Stanisławem Rośkiem, 2003)
- Gombrowicz (2004)
- Proza dwudziestolecia (2005)
- Prowincja Centrum. Przypisy do Schulza (2005)
- Natura i teatr. 16 tekstów o Gombrowiczu (2007)
- Proza: wykroje i wzory (2016)
- Schulzowskie miejsca i znaki (2016)
- Gry poetyckie i teatralne (2018)
- Miasta – rzeczy – przestrzenie (2019)

== Awards ==
- 2006: Plus ratio quam vis Silver Medal from the Jagiellonian University on the occasion of his 45th anniversary of his work with the university
- 2003: Krakowska Książka Miesiąca (Krakow Book of the Month) for Wszechświat Lema
- 1991: Kazimierz Wyka Award
- 1985: Kościelski Award
- 1984 Nagroda Wydziału I PAN im. Aleksandra Brücknera (Alexander Brückner Award of the Department I of the Polish Academy of Sciences)
