= Andrzej Drawicz =

Polish literary critic (1932–1997)

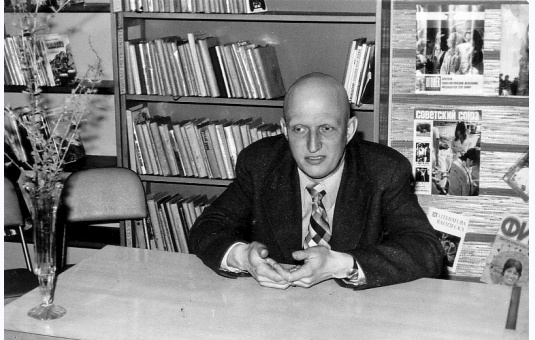
- Drawicz in 1975

Chairman of the Radio Committee
- In office 23 September 1989 – 7 January 1991

Personal details
- Born: 20 May 1932 Warsaw, Poland
- Died: 15 May 1997 (aged 64) Warsaw, Poland
- Education: University of Warsaw

Andrzej Józef Drawicz (20 May 1932 – 15 May 1997) was a Polish essayist, literary critic and translator of Russian literature.

== Career ==
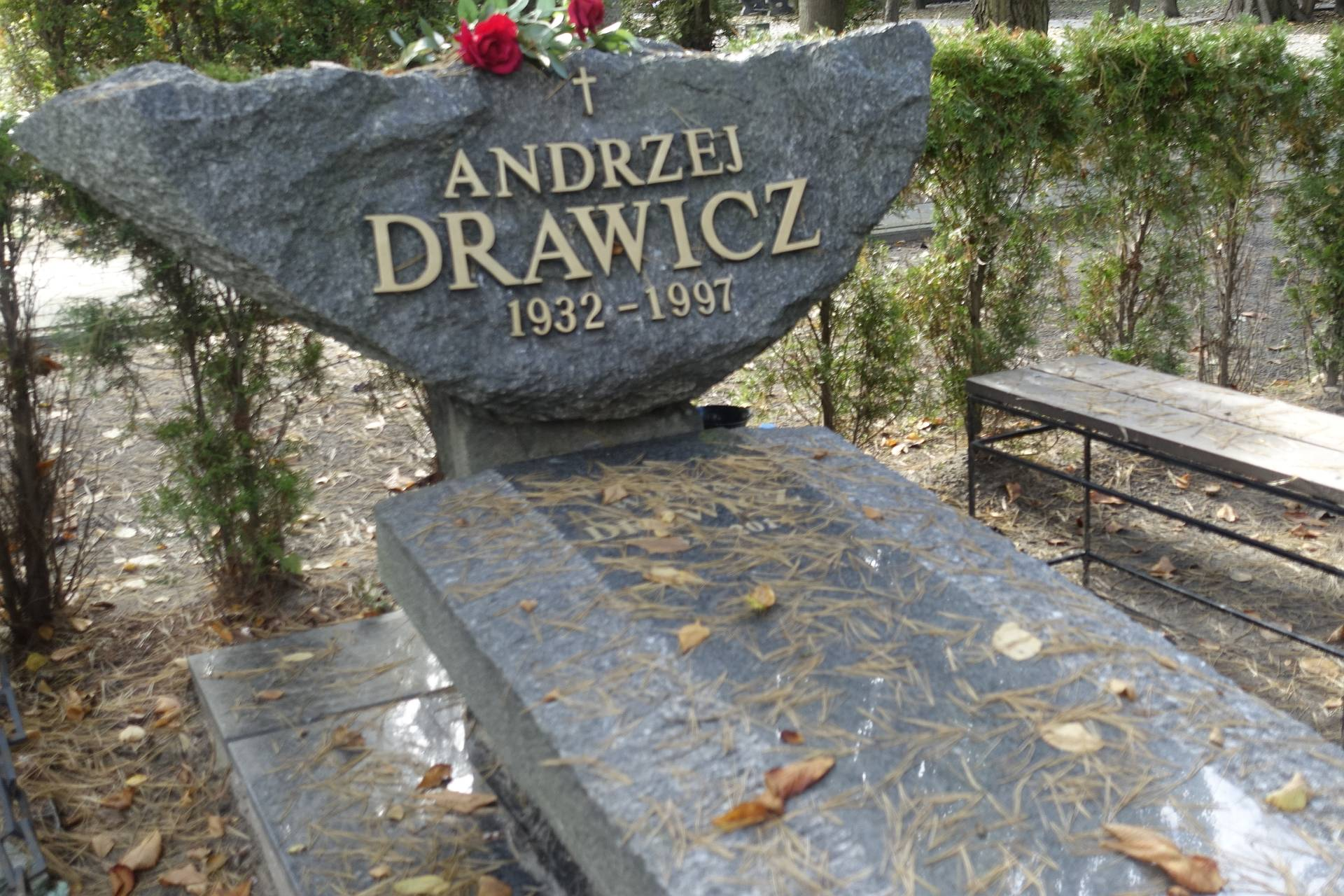
The grave of Andrzej Drawicz in the Powązki Military Cemetery

In recognition of his outstanding services in public activity and for achievements in literary and journalistic work, he was posthumously honoured with the Commander's Cross with Star of the Order of Polonia Restituta by Polish President Aleksander Kwaśniewski on 16 May 1997.

== Bibliography ==
- Strzyżewski, Tomasz (2015). Wielka księga cenzury PRL w dokumentach (in Polish). Warsaw: Prohibita. p. 95. ISBN 978-83-61344-70-4.
