= Marcin Król =

Polish philosopher (1944–2020)

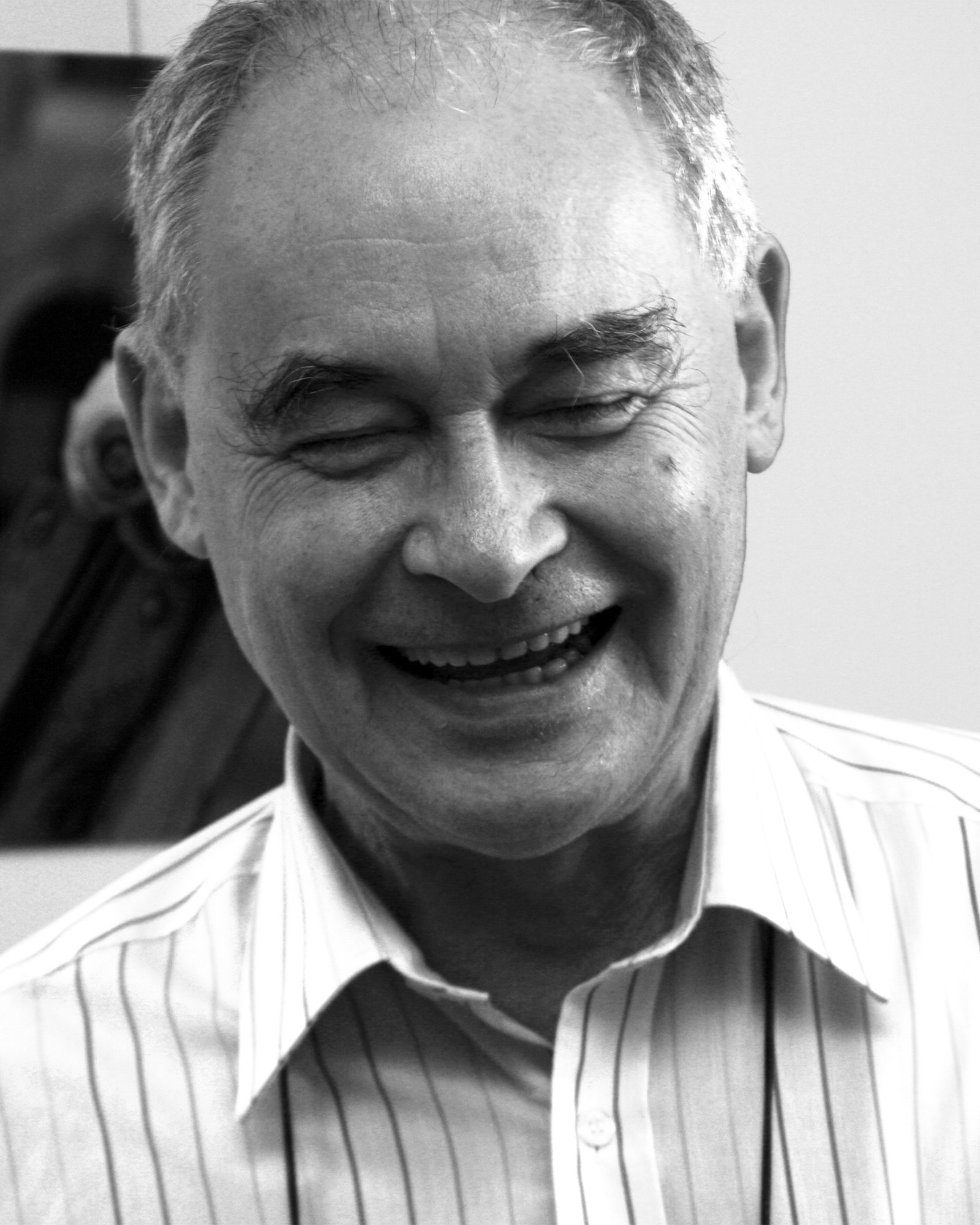
- Born: 18 May 1944; Warsaw, Poland
- Died: 25 November 2020 (aged 76); Biała Podlaska, Poland
- Education: University of Warsaw
- Spouses: Małgorzata Dziewulska; Julia Kalinowska-Król

Marcin Feliks Król (18 May 1944 – 25 November 2020) was a Polish philosopher, historian of ideas, publicist and professor of the University of Warsaw. He was a democratic opposition activist in the Polish People's Republic.

As a participant in the March events of 1968, Król was imprisoned in the same year for several months. He was a long-time contributing editor of the Tygodnik Powszechny weekly, as well as co-founder and editor-in-chief of the Res Publica magazine. In 1975, Król was a signatory to the Letter of 59 against changes to the Constitution of the People's Republic of Poland.

He was participant in the Round Table talks and a member of the Solidarity Citizens' Committee with Lech Wałęsa. He was the chairman of the Stefan Batory Foundation.
