= Imre Kertész =

Hungarian author (1929–2016)

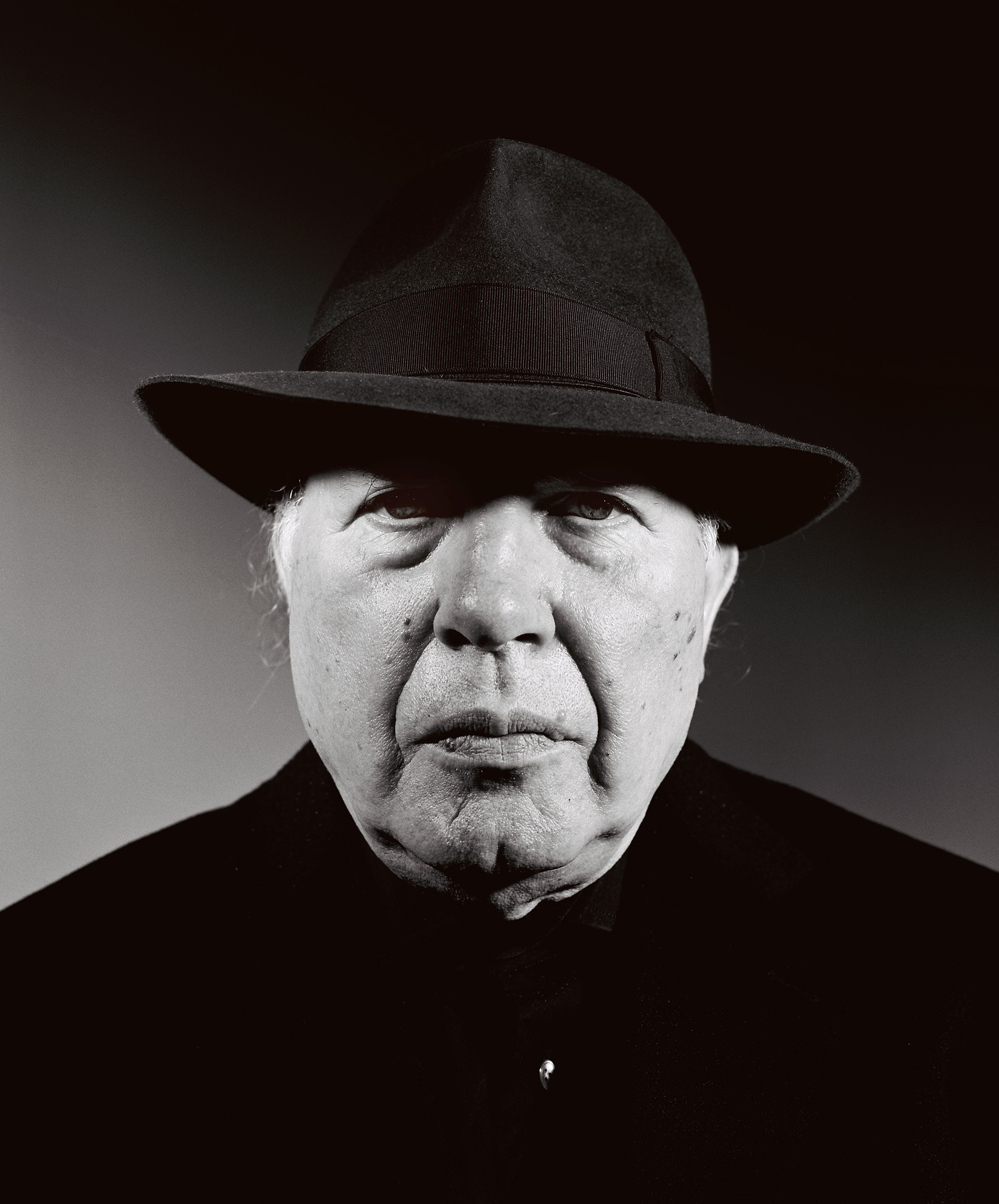
- Imre Kertész photographed by Oliver Mark, Berlin 2005
- Born: 9 November 1929; Budapest, Hungary
- Died: 31 March 2016 (aged 86); Budapest, Hungary
- Occupation: Novelist
- Spouse(s): Albina Vas (d. 1995) Magda Ambrus (m. 1996) (d. 2016)
- Writing career
- Notable works: Fatelessness; Kaddish for an Unborn Child; Liquidation
- Notable awards: Nobel Prize in Literature; 2002

Imre Kertész (Hungarian: [ˈimrɛ ˈkɛrteːs]; 9 November 1929 – 31 March 2016) was a Hungarian author and recipient of the 2002 Nobel Prize in Literature, "for writing that upholds the fragile experience of the individual against the barbaric arbitrariness of history". He was the first Hungarian to win the Nobel in Literature. His works deal with themes of the Holocaust (he was a survivor of German concentration and death camps), dictatorship, and personal freedom.

== Life and work ==
Kertész was born in Budapest, Hungary, on 9 November 1929, the son of Aranka Jakab and László Kertész, a middle-class Jewish couple. After the separation of his parents when he was around the age of five, Kertész attended boarding school, and, in 1940, he started secondary school, where he was put into a special class for Jewish students. During World War II, in 1944 at the age of 14, Kertész was deported with other Hungarian Jews to the Auschwitz concentration camp, and was later sent to Buchenwald. Upon his arrival at Auschwitz, Kertész claimed to be a 16-year-old worker, thus saving himself from the instant extermination that awaited a 14-year-old person. After the camp was liberated in 1945, Kertész returned to Budapest. He graduated from high school in 1948, and then went on to find work as a journalist and translator. In 1951, he lost his job at the journal Világosság (Clarity), when the publication adopted the Communist Party line. For a short term, he worked as a factory worker, and then in the press department of the Ministry of Heavy Industry. From 1953, he started freelance journalism and translated various works into Hungarian, including those of Friedrich Nietzsche, Sigmund Freud, Ludwig Wittgenstein, and Elias Canetti.

His best-known work, Fatelessness (Sorstalanság), describes the experience of 15-year-old György (George) Köves in the concentration camps of Auschwitz, Buchenwald, and Zeitz. Written between 1969 and 1973, the novel was initially rejected for publication by the Communist regime in Hungary, but was published in 1975. Some have interpreted the book as quasi-autobiographical, but Kertész disavowed a strong biographical connection. The book would go on to become part of many high school curriculums in Hungary. In 2005, a film based on the novel, for which he wrote the script, was made in Hungary. Although sharing the same title, some reviews noted that the film was more overtly autobiographical than the novel. It was released internationally at various dates in 2005 and 2006.

Following on from Fatelessness, Kertész's Fiasco (1988) and Kaddish for an Unborn Child (1990) are, respectively, the second and third parts of his Holocaust trilogy. His writings translated into English include Kaddish for an Unborn Child (Kaddis a meg nem született gyermekért) and Liquidation (Felszámolás), the latter set during the period of Hungary's evolution into a democracy from communist rule.

From the beginning, Kertész found little appreciation for his writing in Hungary, and he moved to Germany, where he received more active support from publishers and reviewers, along with more appreciative readers. After his move, he continued translating German works into Hungarian, notably The Birth of Tragedy, the plays of Dürrenmatt, Schnitzler, and Tankred Dorst, and various thoughts and aphorisms of Wittgenstein. Kertész also continued working at his craft, writing his fiction in Hungarian, but did not publish another novel until the late 1980s. From that point on, he submitted his work to publishers in Hungary. Grateful that he had found his most significant success as a writer and artist in Germany, Kertész left his abatement to the Academy of Arts in Berlin.

== Controversies ==
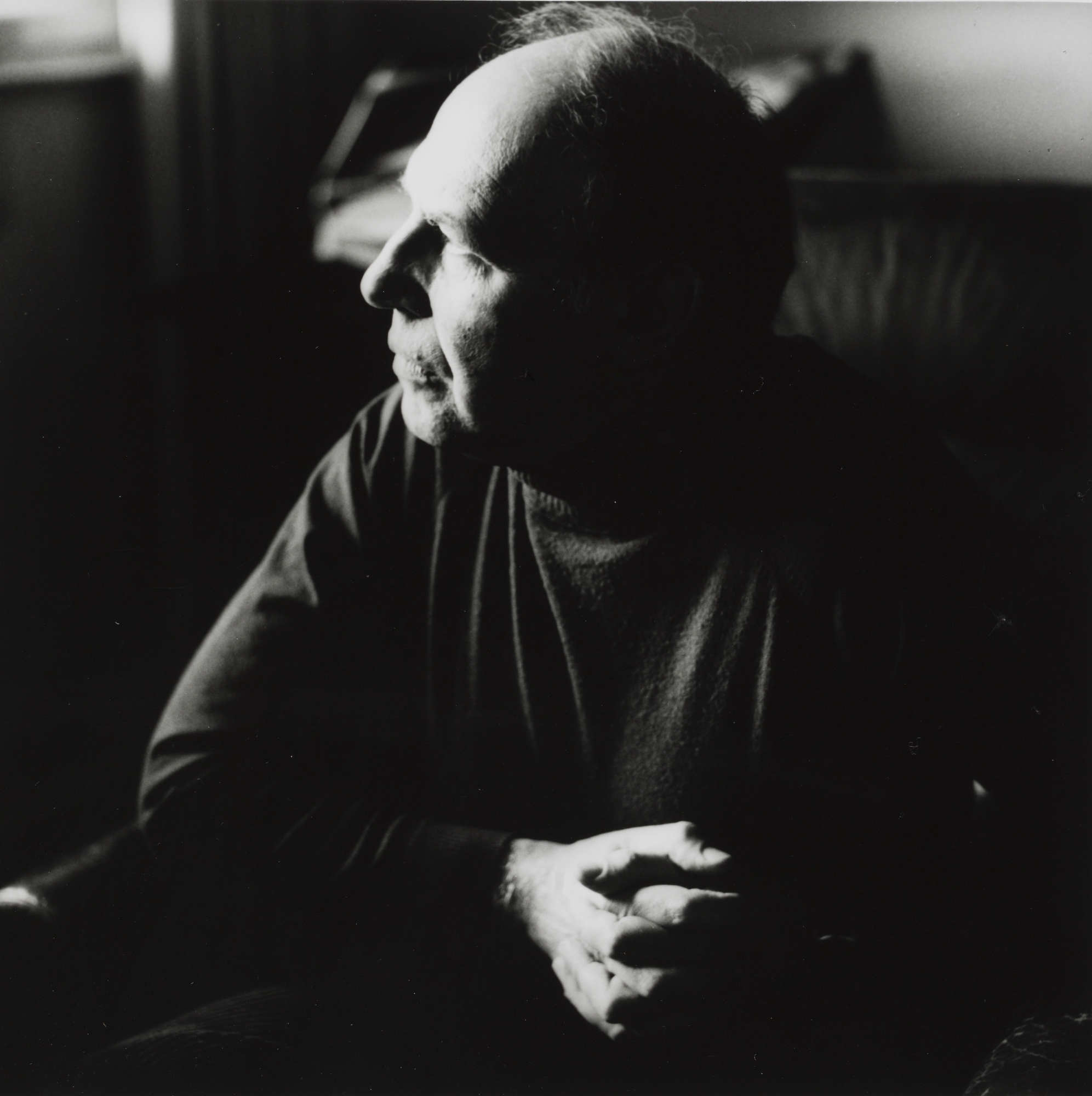
Kertesz in the Bavarian Villa Waldberta (1992)

Kertész was a controversial figure within Hungary, especially since he continued living in Germany as Hungary's first Nobel Laureate in Literature. This tension was exacerbated by a 2009 interview with Die Welt, in which Kertész vowed himself a "Berliner" and called Budapest "completely Balkanized". Many Hungarian newspapers reacted negatively to what they called a hypocritical statement. Other critics viewed the Budapest comment ironically, saying it represented "a grudge policy that is painfully and unmistakably, characteristically Hungarian". In a Duna TV interview Kertész later clarified that he had intended his comment to be "constructive": Hungary was still "his homeland".

Also controversial was Kertész's criticism of Steven Spielberg's depiction of the Holocaust in the 1993 film Schindler's List, saying: "I regard as kitsch any representation of the Holocaust that is incapable of understanding or unwilling to understand the organic connection between our own deformed mode of life (whether in the private sphere or on the level of 'civilization' as such) and the very possibility of the Holocaust."

In November 2014, Kertész was the subject of an interview with The New York Times. Kertész claimed the reporter was expecting him to question Hungary's democratic values and was shocked to hear Kertész say that "the situation in Hungary is nice, I'm having a great time". According to Kertész, "he didn't like my answer. His purpose must have been to make me call Hungary a dictatorship which it isn't. In the end, the interview was never published."

== Health issues and death ==
In November 2013, after a fall in his home, Kertész underwent successful surgery on his right hip, but continued having to deal with various health problems during the last years of his life. Diagnosed with Parkinson's disease, he was again suffering from depression, a recurring battle in his life that he managed to transform into literature: The main character of his 2003 book Felszámolás (Liquidation) commits suicide after a struggle with depression.

On 31 March 2016, at the age of 86, Imre Kertész died at his home in Budapest.

== List of works ==
- Sorstalanság (1975)
  - Fateless, translated by Christopher C. Wilson and Katharina M. Wilson (1992). Evanston, Illinois: Northwestern University Press. ISBN 978-0-8101-1049-6 and ISBN 978-0-8101-1024-3
  - Fatelessness, translated by Tim Wilkinson (2004). New York: Vintage International. ISBN 978-1-4000-7863-9
- A nyomkereső (1977)
  - The Pathseeker, translated by Tim Wilkinson (2008). Brooklyn, New York: Melville House Publishing. ISBN 978-1-933633-53-4
- Detektívtörténet (1977)
  - Detective Story, translated by Tim Wilkinson (2008). London: Harvill Secker. ISBN 978-1-84655-183-3
- A kudarc (1988)
  - Fiasco, translated by Tim Wilkinson (2011). Brooklyn, New York: Melville House Publishing. ISBN 978-1-935554-29-5
- Kaddis a meg nem született gyermekért (1990)
  - Kaddish for a Child Not Born, translated by Christopher C. Wilson and Katharina M. Wilson (1997). Evanston, Illinois: Hydra Books. ISBN 978-0-8101-1161-5
  - Kaddish for an Unborn Child, translated by Tim Wilkinson (2004), New York: Vintage International. ISBN 978-1-4000-7862-2
- Az angol lobogó (1991)
  - The Union Jack, translated by Tim Wilkinson (2010). Brooklyn, New York: Melville House Publishing. ISBN 978-1-933633-87-9
- Gályanapló (1992)
- A holocaust mint kultúra: Három előadás (1993)
- Jegyzőkönyv (1993)
- Valaki más: A változás krónikája (1997)
- A gondolatnyi csend, amíg a kivégzőosztag újratölt (1998)
- A száműzött nyelv (2001)
- Felszámolás (2003)
  - Liquidation, translated by Tim Wilkinson (2004). New York: Knopf. ISBN 978-1-4000-4153-4
- K. dosszié (2006)
  - Dossier K, translated by Tim Wilkinson (2013). Brooklyn, New York: Melville House Publishing. ISBN 978-1-61219-202-4
- Európa nyomasztó öröksége (2008)
- Mentés másként (2011)
- A végső kocsma, The Final Tavern, also published as The Last Refuge (2014)

== Awards and honors ==
=== International prizes ===
- 1992, 1995: Soros Prize
- 1995: Brandenburg Literature Prize
- 1997: Friedrich-Gundolf-Preis
- 1997: Jeanette Schocken Preis
- 2000: Herder Prize
- 2000: Welt-Literaturpreis
- 2001: Pour le Mérite (Germany)
- 2002: Hans Sahl Prize
- 2002: Nobel Prize in Literature
- 2003: YIVO Lifetime Achievement Award
- 2004: Corine Literature Prize
- 2004: Goethe Medal
- 2009: Jean Améry Prize
- 2011: Grande Médaille de Vermeil de la ville de Paris

=== Hungarian prizes ===
- 1983: Milán Füst Prize
- 1986: Hieronymus Prize
- 1988: Artisjus Literature Prize
- 1989: Aszu Prize
- 1989: Attila József Prize
- 1997: Kossuth Prize
- 2002: Honorary Citizen of Budapest
- 2014: Hungarian Order of Saint Stephen

== See also ==
- Hungarian literature
- List of Jewish Nobel laureates
