= Maria Poprzęcka =

Polish art historian

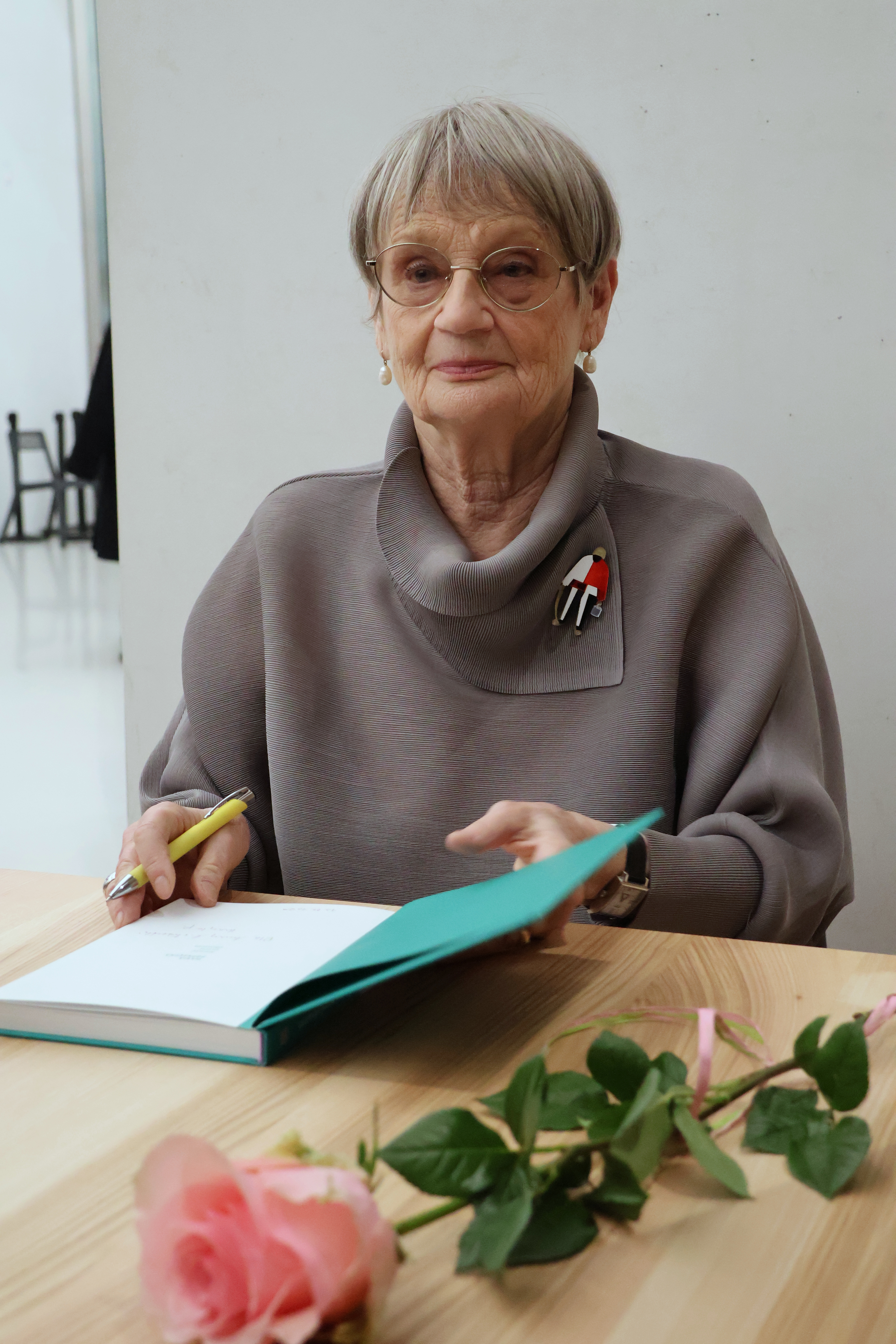
- Poprzęcka during a book signing, 2025
- Born: 1942 (age 83–84); Warschau, General Government
- Education: University of Warsaw

Maria Joanna Poprzęcka (born 20 October 1942 in Warsaw) is a Polish art historian, who served as the director of the Institute of Art History at the University of Warsaw till 2008. A member of the Polish Academy of Arts and Sciences, she has served on the jury for the Nike Award.

== Awards ==
She was the recipient of the Order of Polonia Restituta in 2003, the Gdynia Literary Prize in 2009, the Medal for Merit to Culture – Gloria Artis in 2012 and Kazimierz Wyka Award in 2021.
