= Kaddish for an Unborn Child =

1990 novel by Imre Kertész

- Author: Imre Kertész
- Original title: Kaddis a meg nem született gyermekért
- Translator: Tim Wilkinson; Christopher C. Wilson and Katharina M. Wilson
- Language: Hungarian
- Publication date: 1990
- Publication place: Hungary
- English publication date: 1999

Kaddish for an Unborn Child (Hungarian: Kaddis a meg nem született gyermekért) is a novel by Imre Kertész, first published in 1990 (ISBN 0-8101-1161-6). It was first translated into English in 1997 by Christopher C. Wilson and Katharina M. Wilson as Kaddish for an Unborn Child. A different translation entitled Kaddish for an Unborn Child, translated by Tim Wilkinson was released in 2004. It has been translated into 16 languages.

Kertész won the Nobel Prize for Literature in 2002 "for writing that upholds the fragile experience of the individual against the barbaric arbitrariness of history". In his writing he examines the challenges of renewing a life after being subjected to such difficult events. His works continuously cover the main events of his life: deportation to Auschwitz as a teenage boy and dealing with surviving the horrors and understanding the truths about human degradation.

== About the book ==
Kaddish is the third in a series of four books which follow the same family. His first book Fatelessness (1975) is about a 14-year-old Georg Koves, a Hungarian Jew, who is deported to Auschwitz and Buchenwald concentration camps. In his second book, Fiasco (1988) Köves survives the Holocaust and is living in Soviet-occupied Hungary. Kertész's fourth novel is Liquidation (2003).

Kaddish for an Unborn Child (1990) deals with the struggles of Georg Köves as an older adult. He explains to a friend why he cannot bring a child into a world that allows such atrocities to happen. The book also deals with the narrator's failed marriage, his unsuccessful literary career, and his Jewishness.

=== Concept of Kaddish ===
Kaddish, actually known as the Mourner's Kaddish, is a prayer which praises God, and is said to memorialize the death of close relatives. It is recited by mourners during the daily prayers in the months after the death of parents, siblings, and children and on the year anniversary of their deaths. It is intended to comfort them.

Kertesz, in the form of Koves, is essentially reciting Kaddish, not for a child who died, but for the idea of a child whom he did not want to give birth to, only to die in some horrific situation.

== About the author ==
Kertesz was born in 1929 in Budapest, Hungary. At age 15 when the Nazis invaded Hungary, he was deported to Auschwitz concentration camp and then to the Buchenwald concentration camp. He was liberated in 1945 and returned to Hungary. When the communists came to power he did not agree with them and was fired from his job as a journalist and had to earn a living through translating primarily German authors into Hungarian. He died in Budapest in 2016.

== English translations ==
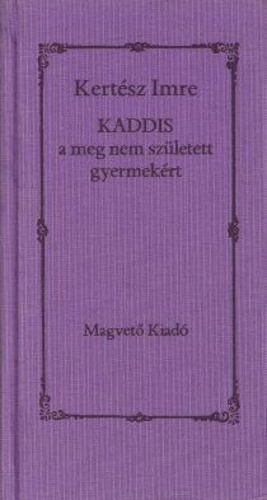
First edition cover

- Kaddish for an Unborn Child, tr. Tim Wilkinson, 2004, ISBN 1-4000-7862-8
- Kaddish for a Child Not Born, tr. Christopher C. Wilson and Katharina M. Wilson, 1999, ISBN 0-8101-1161-6
