= Andrzej Busza =

Polish poet and writer

Andrzej Busza (born 1938, Poland), is a Polish Canadian poet, translator, essayist. Associated Professor Emeritus of the University of British Columbia in Vancouver.
After the outbreak of the World War II, his family fled through Romania to Palestine where they stayed until 1947, when they settled in England. Andrzej Busza studied there in London (St. Joseph's College and University College London of the University of London). Soon he became active in Polish émigré literary circles. In 1965 he moved to Canada where for many years he taught English literature on University of British Columbia.

Busza's major contribution to the study of English literature comes mainly from his work on Joseph Conrad life and literary achievements, including Busza's translations from Polish literature. He is an honorary member of the Polish Historical Institute in Rome and International Association of University Professors of English. His first published poems appeared in London's Polish literary periodical "Kontynenty" in the 1950s.

== Books of poetry ==
- Znaki wodne, Paris, 1969
- Astrologer in the Underground, translated from Polish by Michael Bullock and J. Boraks, Ohio, 1979
- Głosy i refleksje, translated from English by B. Czaykowski, Berlin, 2001
- Scenes from the life of Laquedem, Toronto/Berlin, 2003, ISBN 0-921724-27-6

Many individual poems, essays and translations by Busza appeared in literary, cultural and academic journals, i.e.: Kultura (Paris), Fraza (Rzeszów), Strumien (Vancouver), Akcenty (Lublin), and others.
