= Fatelessness =

Novel by Imre Kertész

- First edition cover
- Author: Imre Kertész
- Original title: Sorstalanság
- Translator: Christopher C. Wilson; Katharina M. Wilson
- Cover artist: István Engel Tevan
- Language: Hungarian
- Genre: Autobiographical novel
- Publisher: Szépirodalmi Könyvkiadó
- Publication date: 1975
- Publication place: Budapest
- English publication date: 1992
- Media type: Print (Hardback & Paperback)
- Pages: 291
- ISBN: 963-15-0292-9
- OCLC: 5730578
- LC Class: PH3281.K3815 S67

Fateless or Fatelessness (Hungarian: Sorstalanság, lit. 'Fatelessness') is the first novel by Imre Kertész, winner of the 2002 Nobel Prize for literature. He began writing it in the 1960 but it was rejected for publication by the Communist regime in Hungary. It was finally published in 1975.

The novel is considered a quasi-autobiographical story about a 14-year-old Hungarian Jew's experiences in the Auschwitz and Buchenwald concentration camps, as Kertesz was sent to Auschwitz at this age, after the Nazi's entered Budapest in March 1944.

The book is the first part of a trilogy, which continues the story of György Köves, as he grows older. In A kudarc ("Fiasco" ISBN 0-8101-1161-6) he has survived the camps and tries to deal with post-war Hungary; in Kaddis a meg nem született gyermekért ("Kaddish for an Unborn Child" ISBN 1-4000-7862-8) he explains how it is that he cannot bring himself to bring a child into a world capable of such atrocities.

Kertész won the Nobel Prize for Literature in 2002, "for writing that upholds the fragile experience of the individual against the barbaric arbitrariness of history", and how one deals with his survivor after knowing so many who died. one can handle surviving when so many other people died. This literary concept is called “witness literature”, describing trauma from personal experience.

The book was first translated into English by Christopher C. Wilson and Katharina M. Wilson in 1992 as Fateless (ISBN 0-8101-1049-0 and ISBN 0-8101-1024-5), while in 2004 a second translation by Tim Wilkinson appeared (ISBN 1-4000-7863-6) under the title Fatelessness. In the UK edition, Wilkinson's translation retained the title Fatelessness (ISBN 978-1-784-87215-1).

== Plot summary ==
The novel is about a young Hungarian boy, György "Gyuri" Köves, living in Budapest. The book opens as György's father is being sent to a labor camp. Soon afterwards, György receives working papers and travels to work outside of the Jewish quarter. One day all of the Jews are pulled off of the buses leaving the Jewish quarter, and are sent to Auschwitz on a train without water. Arriving there, György lies about his age, unknowingly saving his own life, and tells us of camp life and the conditions he faces.

Eventually he is sent to Buchenwald, and continues on describing his life in a concentration camp, before being finally sent to another camp in Zeitz. György falls ill and nears death, but remains alive and is eventually sent to a hospital facility in a concentration camp until the war ends. Returning to Budapest, he is confronted with those who were not sent to camps and had just recently begun to hear of the terrible injustice and suffering.

== Film adaptation ==
A film adaptation, with screenplay by Imre Kertész, was released in 2005, made in Hungary by director Lajos Koltai, with Marcell Nagy in the starring role. It also features British actor Daniel Craig, who plays a cameo as an American Army Sergeant.

== See also ==
- Adelman, Gary (Winter–Spring 2004). "Getting Started with Imre Kertész". New England Review. 25 (1–2): 261–278. JSTOR 40244398.
- Bachmann, Michael (Spring 2009). "Life, Writing, and Problems of Genre in Elie Wiesel and Imre Kertész". Rocky Mountain Review. 63 (1): 79–88. JSTOR 27670842.
- Kertész, Imre (April–June 2003). "Eureka! The 2002 Nobel Lecture". World Literature Today. 77 (1): 4–8. doi:10.2307/40157770. JSTOR 40157770.
- Nádas, Péter (Winter 2002). "Imre Kertész's Work and His Subject". Hungarian Quarterly. 43 (168): 38–40.
- Sicher, Efraim (2005). The Holocaust Novel. New York: Routledge. ISBN 0-415-96796-1.
- Vasvári, Louise O.; Tötösy de Zepetnek, Steven, eds. (2005). Imre Kertész and Holocaust Literature. West Lafayette, IN: Purdue University Press. ISBN 1-55753-396-2.
