= Tim Wilkinson (translator) =

English translator of Hungarian (1947–2020)

Tim Wilkinson (1947 –2020) was an English translator of Hungarian. He is best known for his translations of Nobel Prize laureate Imre Kertész and Miklós Szentkuthy.

== Biography ==
After studying biochemistry at the University of Liverpool, he moved to Budapest in 1970 to work at the Central Institute of Physics. He arrived not knowing Hungarian and learnt the language “on the hoof” by living in Budapest with his Hungarian wife.

Wilkinson worked in the pharmaceutical industry and only started literary translations in the late nineties after being horrified with the existing English translation of Kertész’s Kaddish for an Unborn Child. He was also concerned with the general lack of English translations of Hungarian literature, noting that on average ten times more Hungarian titles are published annually in translation in Germany than the United Kingdom.

Wilkinson also produced a new translation of Fatelessness which won the PEN America translation prize in 2005 and the Jewish Quarterly-Wingate Prize in 2006. The latter part of his professional life was dedicated to translating Miklós Szentkuthy.
