= Biedrzycki =

Biedrzycki (feminine: Biedrzycka) is a Polish surname. Notable people with the surname include:

- Agnieszka Biedrzycka, Polish historian
- David Biedrzycki (born 1955), American illustrator and writer of children's books
- Miłosz Biedrzycki (born 1967), Polish poet
