= Józef Baran =

Polish poet

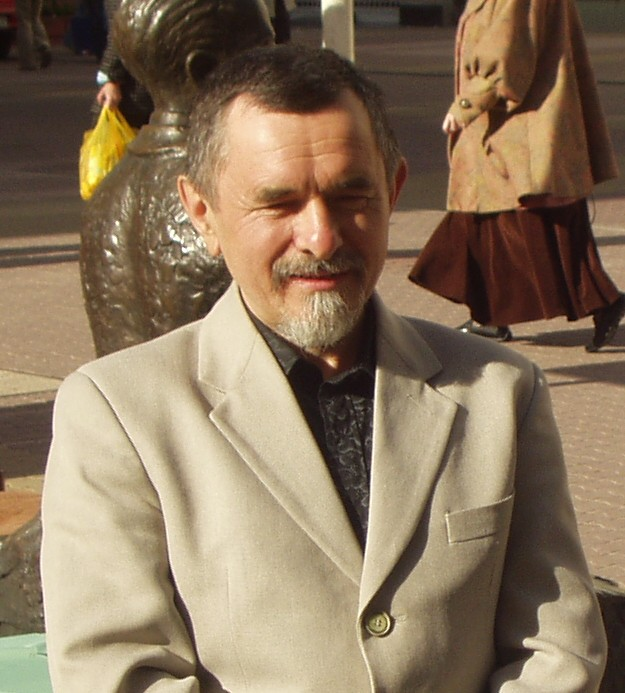
- Józef Baran standing on Piotrkowska Street in Łódź (2005)
- Born: 17 January 1947 (age 79)
- Occupation: Poet
- Citizenship: Polish

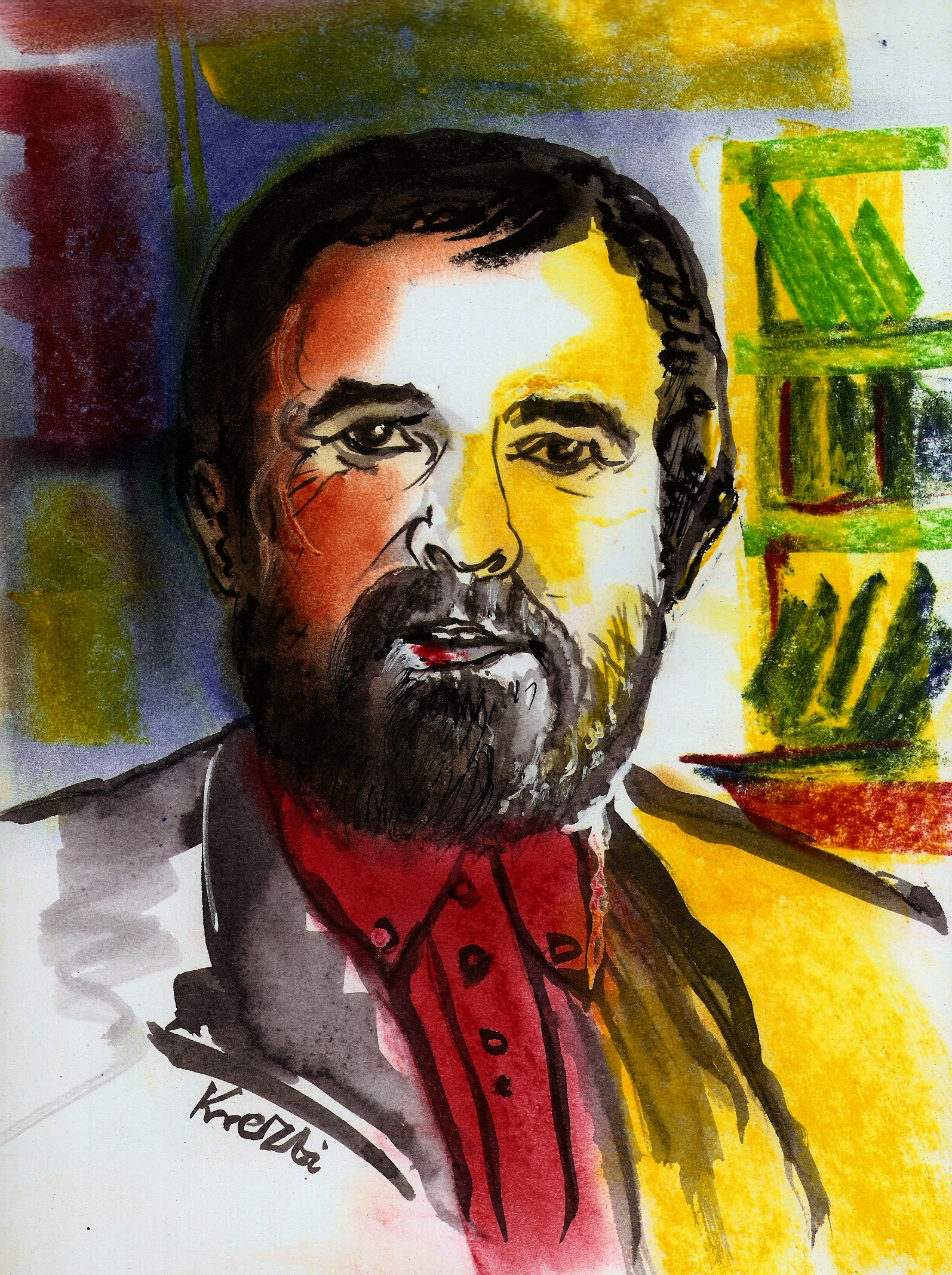
Józef Baran drawing Zbigniew Kresowaty

Józef Baran (born 17 January 1947) is a Polish poet.

== Biography ==
Baran was born on 17 January 1947, in Borzęcin. He graduated with degrees from the technical center in Wałbrzych and then in Polish philology from the Pedagogical University of Kraków. He debuted in 1969 in the weekly almanac "Życie Literackie". Artur Sandauer wrote about him that his poetry reaches "directly into the heart of ordinary people". Since 1975 he was chief editor of the journal "Wieści", later in Kraków Dziennik Polski. His poems were part of the Polish school material. His texts have been published in many international anthologies. Many of his poems were templates for chansons, for artists including Stare Dobre Małżeństwo, Elżbieta Adamiak, Hanna Banaszak, Krzysztof Myszkowski and Andrzej Zarycki. His poems have been translated into English, Hebrew, German, Czech, Russian, Spanish and Swedish.

== Works ==
=== Books ===
- "Nasze najszczersze rozmowy": Poetry – Kraków, Wydawnictwo Literackie, 1974
- "Dopóki jeszcze": Poetry – Warsaw, Ludowa Spółdzielnia Wydawnicza, 1976
- "Na tyłach świata": Poetry – Kraków, Wydawnictwo Literackie, 1977
- "W błysku zapałki": Poetry – Warsaw, Ludowa Spółdzielnia Wydawnicza, 1979
- "Wiersze wybrane" – Warsaw, Ludowa Spółdzielnia Wydawnicza, 1984
- "Pędy i pęta": Poetry – Kraków, Wydawnictwo Literackie, 1984
- "Autor! Autor!: rozmowy z ludźmi pióra i palety." – Warsaw, Ludowa Spółdzielnia Wydawnicza, 1986
- "Skarga": Poetry – Szczecin, "Glob", 1988
- "Czułość": Poetry – Kraków, Miniatura, 1988, 1989
- "Wiersze wybrane" – Kraków, "Miniatura", 1990
- "Śnił mi się Artur Sandauer": conversations and memories – Kraków, Centrum Kultury Żydowskiej Na Kazimierzu, Hereditas Polono – Judaica, 1992
- "Pacierz Szwejka": Poetry – Kraków, "Miniatura", 1992
- "Mała kosmogonia": Poetry – Kraków, "Miniatura", 1994
- "115 wierszy" ( 115 poems from the years 1985–1993) – Tarnów, "Comdruk", 1994
- "Zielnik miłosny": Poetry – Oficyna Konfraterni Poetów, Kraków – Jawor (1995)
- "Zielnik miłosny": Poetry – wyd. II, Konfraterania Poetów (1996)
- "Epifania słoneczna": Poetry – Poznań, Arka, 1997
- "Majowe zaklęcie": Poetry – Kraków, Wydawnictwo Baran i Suszczyński, 1997
- "Pod zielonym drzewem życia": Poetry – seria Poeci Krakowa, Kraków, Śródmiejski Ośrodek Kultury w Krakowie, 2000
- "Dolina ludzi spokojnych" (fotografie – Jakub Ciećkiewicz) – Tarnów, Biblos, 2001
- "Dom z otwartymi ścianami" – Warszawa, Nowy Świat, 2001
- "Najdłuższa podróż" – Warsaw, Nowy świat, 2002
- "Spotkanie – Begegnung" – Kraków, Oficyna Konfraterni Poetów – 2003 (przekład na niemiecki Henryk Bereska)
- "A wody płyną i płyną" – Toruń, Wyd. Adam Marszałek, 2004
- "Koncert dla nosorożca – dziennik poety z przełomu wieków" – Poznań, Zysk i S-ka, 2005
- "Zielnik miłosny i inne liryki" – Poznań, Zysk i S-ka, 2005
- "Tragarze wyobraźni" – Rzeszów, Podkarpacki Instytut Książki i Marketingu, 2006
- "Taniec z ziemia" – Poznań, Zysk i S-ka, 2006
- "Rondo. Wiersze z lat 2006–2009" – Poznań, Zysk i S-ka, 2009
- "Podróże z tej i nie z tej ziemi" – migawki z sześciu kontynentów: Europy, obu Ameryk, Australii, Azji i Afryki – Poznań, Zysk i S-ka, 2010
- "Borzęcin. Poezja i proza Józefa Barana" – Gminna Biblioteka Publiczna w Borzęcinie, 2014

=== Books in other languages ===
- English: "Hymn poranny", London Publishing Br@ndBook, 2006
- English: Józef Baran "Tylko aż – Only So much", Podkarpacki Instytut Książki i Marketingu, Rzeszów 2007. Translation: Ewa Hryniewicz-Yarbrough
- English: Józef Baran – "W Błysku – In a Flash", Cross – Cultural Communications, Wydawnictwo Baran i Suszczyński, New York /Kraków 2000. Translation: Aniela i Jerzy Gregorek
- English: Józef Baran -" Late Confession" – poetry miscellany chapbook, richard seehuus editor, Chattanooga, Tennessee, 1977, Translated by Jerzy Gregorek
- Spanish: Józef Baran – "Casa de parades abiertas", Antologia poetica (1974–2006), Editiones Trea, Seleccion, traduccion y estudio preliminar de Anna Sobieska y Antonio Benitez Burraco
- Russian: "Pochwała zabwienia", Józef Baran, Wyd. Wahazar, Moscow 1996, translation: Andriej Bazilewskij
- German: Józef Baran "Spotkanie – Begegnung" – Oficyna Konfraterni Poetów, Kraków 2003, translation: Henryk Bereska

=== Songs ===
- "Najlepsze lata – Atlantyda" (composition Elżbieta Adamiak)
- "Prośba o nadzieję" (composition Elżbieta Adamiak)
- "Szara piosenka" (composition Elżbieta Adamiak)
- "Ballada majowa" (composition Krzysztof Myszkowski)
- "Ballada o arenie cyrkowej" (composition Krzysztof Myszkowski)
- "Niepokój" (composition Krzysztof Myszkowski)
- "Spóźnione wyznanie" (composition Roman Ziobro)
- "Ballada z gór" (composition Krzysztof Myszkowski)
- "Ballada o poecie" (composition Krzysztof Myszkowski)
- "Zwózka nieba" (composition Krzysztof Myszkowski)
- "Przechyla się ku jesieni ziemia" (composition Krzysztof Myszkowski)
- "Zapomniany grajek" (composition Krzysztof Myszkowski)
- "Szara ballada" (composition Krzysztof Myszkowski)
- "Ballada o dwóch braciach" (composition Mirosław Czyżykiewicz)
- "Ballada na urodziny" (composition Krzysztof Myszkowski)
- "Ballada powojowa" (composition Krzysztof Myszkowski)
- "Piosenka o nadziei" (composition Krzysztof Myszkowski)
- "Pastorałka bezdrożna" (composition Krzysztof Myszkowski)
- "Marcowy swing" (composition Ryszard Żarowski)
- "Piosenka zauroczonego" (composition Krzysztof Myszkowski)
- "Ballada o listopadzie" (composition Krzysztof Myszkowski)
- "Piosenka dla tych, którzy się rozstają" (composition Arkadiusz Zawiliński)
- "Piwnicę Pod Baranami" (translation into Polish, composition Dieter Kalka)

== Prizes ==
- 1975 – Bursa-prize for the best debut band ("Nasze najszczersze rozmowy")
- 1977 – Stanisława Piętaka Award for the band "Dopóki jeszcze"
- 1980 – Kościelski Prize for "W błysku zapałki"
- 1984 – Nagroda Funduszu Literatury for the best poetry book of the year ("Pedy i peta")
- 1992 – Doroczna Nagroda Wojewody Małopolskiego
- 2001 – Kraków's Book of the Month – August 2001 – for the book "Dom z otwartymi ścianami"
- 2001 – Award of Pen West in Los Angeles for the bilingual poetry book "W błysku. In a Flash" (translation. J. A. Gregorek)
- 2002 – Władysław-Orkana Prize
- 2004 – Prize of the City of Kraków

== Bibliography ==
- Roman Mazurkiewicz, Piotr Borek, Marek Karwala (2019). Literackie kosmografie Józefa Barana. Księgarnia Akademicka. ISBN 9788376389974.
