= Klementyna Żurowska =

Polish art historian (1924–2015)

Dr. Klementyna Żurowska
- Born: 23 May 1924; Perespa, Poland
- Died: 8 May 2015 (aged 90)
- Occupation: Art historian

Academic background
- Education: Uniwersytet Jagielloński
- Thesis: Rotunda Panny Marii na Wawelu (1964)

Academic work
- Discipline: Art history
- Sub-discipline: Medieval art

Klementyna Maria Żurowska z Leszczkowa (23 May 1924, in Perespa – 8 May 2015) was a Polish art historian specializing in the Middle Ages.

== Life ==
She was born the sixth and youngest child of Karolina (née Kraińska) and Roman Żurowski. She received her early education at home in Leszczków. In 1937, her parents sent her to the Sisters of the Immaculate Conception (Sisters of the Immaculate) secondary school in Jarosław. She had five siblings: Wincenty (1915–1994), Maria Helena (1916–1999), Stanisław Andrzej (1918–1996), Wanda (born 1920, died young), and Anna (1922–1943), who died at Majdanek. She never married. Inheriting a strong sense of social commitment from her parents, she organized or participated in initiatives and projects providing aid to those in need.

== World War II ==
She completed the third year of secondary school through underground classes in Warsaw (at the Sisters of the Immaculate facility on Kazimierzowska Street), and the fourth year of secondary school plus the first and half of the second year of high school at the Sisters of the Immaculate school in Szymanów. On December 30, 1942, she was arrested by the Gestapo in Warsaw along with her parents and two sisters; she was imprisoned at Pawiak and subsequently transported to Majdanek on 17 January 1943. On 19 April 1944, she was transferred to the Ravensbrück with her mother and eldest sister, Maria. Liberated by American troops in 1945, she returned to Poznań on foot and then traveled by train to Kraków.

== Academic career ==
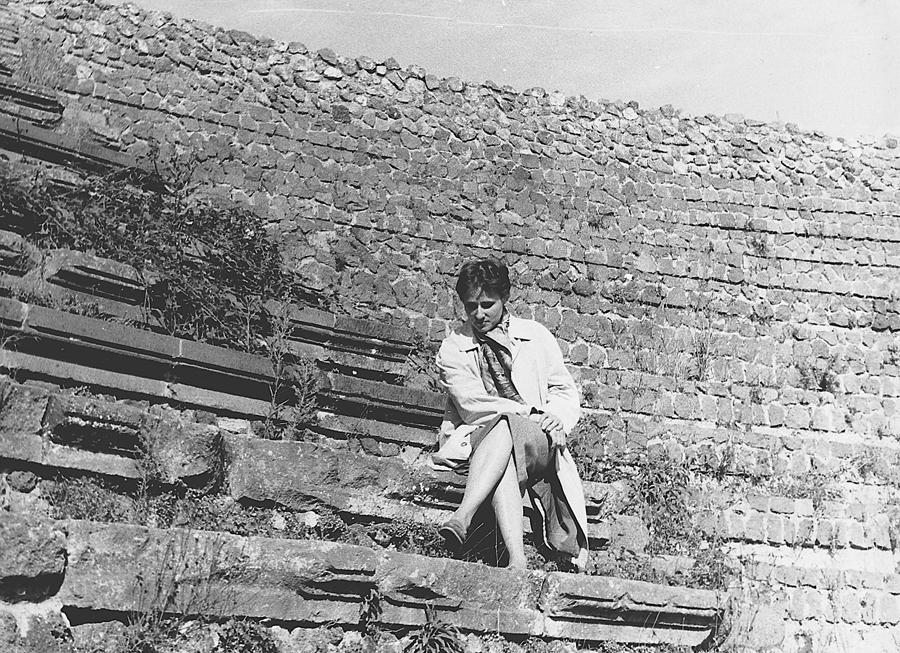
On the Theatre Area of Pompeii, 1959.

She passed her secondary school final exams in 1946 at the Sisters of the Immaculate school in Szymanów. She then studied art history at the Jagiellonian University. She wrote and defended her master's thesis under Professor Vojeslav Molè in 1952. She worked at Wawel Castle for five and a half years, guiding tours. In 1958, she went to Poitiers for Postgraduate education. Upon returning from France in 1960, she accepted a position as an assistant in the Department of Art History under Professor Lech Kalinowski. Between 1961 and 1965, she participated in archaeological excavations at Tyniec. She defended her doctoral thesis: Rotunda Panny Marii na Wawelu (The Rotunda of the Virgin Mary at Wawel), in 1964. From December 1966, she held a one-year Jagiellonian University scholarship in Geneva, and in the 1970s, she spent three months in Rome.

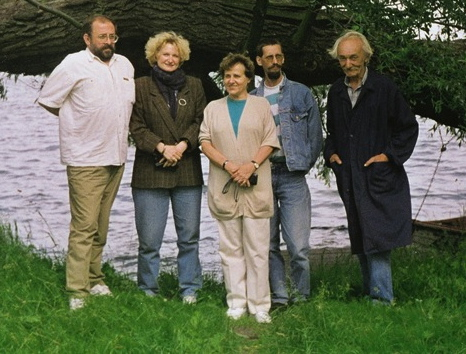
The team conducting excavations on Ostrów Lednicki, 1992: Tomasz Węcławowicz, Teresa Rodzińska-Chorąży, Klementyna Żurowska, Jacek Wrzesiński, and Mateusz Łastowiecki.

In 1971, she obtained her habilitation based on her body of scholarly work and a study on Romanesque architecture in Tyniec. During this period, she also served as deputy director of the institute and oversaw extramural students. From 1970, she lectured and conducted proseminars on general medieval art. Between 1987 and 1990, she led excavations at Ostrów Lednicki. She was appointed an associate professor in 1989. She retired in 1994, but continued to publish scholarly studies and reviews. In 2014, she published her memoirs under the title Z Leszczkowa w świat (From Leszczków into the World), for which she was honored with the Kraków Book of the Month Award for October 2014.

== Honors and awards ==
- 1985: Gold Cross of Merit
- 1990: Order of Polonia Restituta
- 1994:Pro Ecclesia et Pontifice
- 1994: Medal of the Commission of National Education
- 2013: Lednica Piast Eagle Award
- 2013: Honorary Medal of the Institute of Art History, Jagiellonian Universit

== Selected publications ==
- Klementyna Żurowska, Rotunda wawelska, Studium nad centralną architekturą epoki wczesnopiastowskiej (praca doktorska), w: Studia do dziejów Wawelu, t. 3, Kraków 1968, s. 1-121 (online w repozytorium)
- Klementyna Żurowska, Studia nad architekturą wczesnopiastowską, "Zeszyty Naukowe UJ" 642, "Prace z Historii Sztuki" 17, Warszawa-Kraków 1983 (online w repozytorium)
- Ostrów Lednicki, red. Klementyna Żurowska, t. 1-2, Kraków 1993-1994 (online w repozytorium)
- Tyniec: sztuka i kultura benedyktynów od wieku XI do XVIII: katalog wystawy w Zamku Królewskim na Wawelu, październik-grudzień 1994 r., red. nauk. Klementyna Żurowska, oprac. red. Maria Podlodowska-Reklewska i Elżbieta Pycińska, Kraków: nakł. Opactwa Benedyktynów w Tyńcu, 1994.
- Benedyktyni tynieccy w średniowieczu: materiały z sesji naukowej, Wawel-Tyniec, 13-15 października 1994 r., red. nauk. Klementyna Żurowska, Kraków 1995.
- Adam Biedroń, Teresa Rodzińska-Chorąży, Klementyna Żurowska, Architektura kamienna Ostrowa Lednickiego w świetle badań z lat 1987-90, "Studia Lednickie", Lednica-Poznań 1991.
- Klementyna Żurowska, "Z Leszczkowa w świat", Kraków 2014 r.

== Bibliography ==
- Lapides Viventes, Kraków: Wydawnictwo Uniwersytetu Jagiellońskiego, 2005, s. 395.
- Andrzej Włodarek, Klementyna Żurowska [w:] Z Leszczkowa w świat, Kraków 2014.
- Zbigniew Wawszczak, Kresy Krajobraz Serdeczny, Rzeszów, 2013 r., tom II, s. 142-155.
