= Anna Szałapak =

Polish ethnologist, ethnographer and singer (1952–2017)

Anna Małgorzata Szałapak
- Born: 22 September 1952; Kraków, Poland
- Died: 14 October 2017 (aged 65); Kraków,
- Resting place: Rakowicki Cemetery; 50.075°N 19.952°E
- Occupations: Ethnologist; singer
- Known for: Performances of sung poetry at the Piwnica pod Baranami cabaret; research into Kraków nativity scenes

Anna Małgorzata Szałapak (22 September 1952 – 14 October 2017) was a Polish ethnographer, ethnologist, singer, and performer of sung poetry, particularly at the Piwnica pod Baranami literary cabaret in Kraków.

== Early life and education ==
Szałapak was born on 22 September 1952 in Kraków. She later referred to her birthday as "the last day of summer". She studied ethnography at the Jagiellonian University. She also danced in the song and dance ensemble of the university, known as Słowianki. Between 1979 and 1997, she performed at Piwnica pod Baranami, being originally invited by Andrzej Maj, and taking part in many of the theatre's activities in Poland and abroad. An outstanding singer known for her lyrical interpretations of poems by Polish poets, she performed works by poets and composers such as Agnieszka Osiecka, Ewa Lipska, Czesław Miłosz, Zygmunt Konieczny, Zbigniew Preisner, and Jan Kanty Pawluśkiewicz. Osiecka referred to her as the "White Angel of Piwnica pod Baranami".

== Career ==
In 1987, she began to present her own recitals, such as: Z niech są świat (What the World Consists of, 1987), Koncert karęd z szopką krakowskiej w tle (Christmas Carols Concert with a Krakow nativity scene in the Background, 1990) and Żywa woda (Living Water, 1997). Szałapak was a curator of the Historical Museum of Kraków. She was the author of the book Krakowskie szopki (Kraków Nativity Scenes), published in 2002 and organized nativity scene competitions, for which she was also a judge. She also presented many exhibitions of nativity scenes at the museum, exhibiting these in Italy, France, Scandinavia, the US and Ukraine. She published Legendy i tajemnice Krakowa (Legends and secrets of Kraków) on the 750th anniversary of the founding of that city.

An ethnographer and social anthropologist, she defended her doctoral thesis in 2012 at the Faculty of History of the Jagiellonian University. It was entitled the Kraków Christmas Crib as the Phenomenon of Cracovian Folklore, and was published by the Historical Museum. She was well known in Kraków as she always dressed in white or very light colours.

== Awards and honours ==
- In 1998, Szałapak received the award of the Third Programme of Polish Radio Mateusz 97 for artistic achievements, original interpretation of literary songs and her unique style.
- In August 2005, she was awarded the Krakow Book of the Month award for the publication Legendy i tajemnice Krakowa.
- She was awarded the Golden Laurel for mastery in the art of literary song, by the Foundation of Polish Culture.
- In 2016, on the 60th anniversary of the establishment of the cabaret Piwnica pod Baranami, she was awarded the Knight's Cross of the Order of Polonia Restituta for her outstanding contribution to Polish culture and achievements in artistic work.

== Death ==
Szałapak died on 14 October 2017 in Kraków after a long illness. She was buried at the Rakowicki Cemetery.

== Discography ==
- 1991: Anna Szałapak from Piwnica pod Baranami
- 1999: Anna Szałapak w Trójce (Concert at Trójka)
- 2000: Żywa woda czyli Rzeka nierzeczywista (Living Water or the Unreal River)
- 2004: Serce na rowerach (Heart on Bikes), a collection of songs recorded on Valentine's Day, dealing with life and love
- 2011: Christmas carols concert with the Krakow Nativity Scene in the background.
- 2026: Anikoty, with Michał Zabłocki, posthmously.
