= Joanna Hańderek =

Polish philosopher of culture, academic, author, and professor (born 1974)

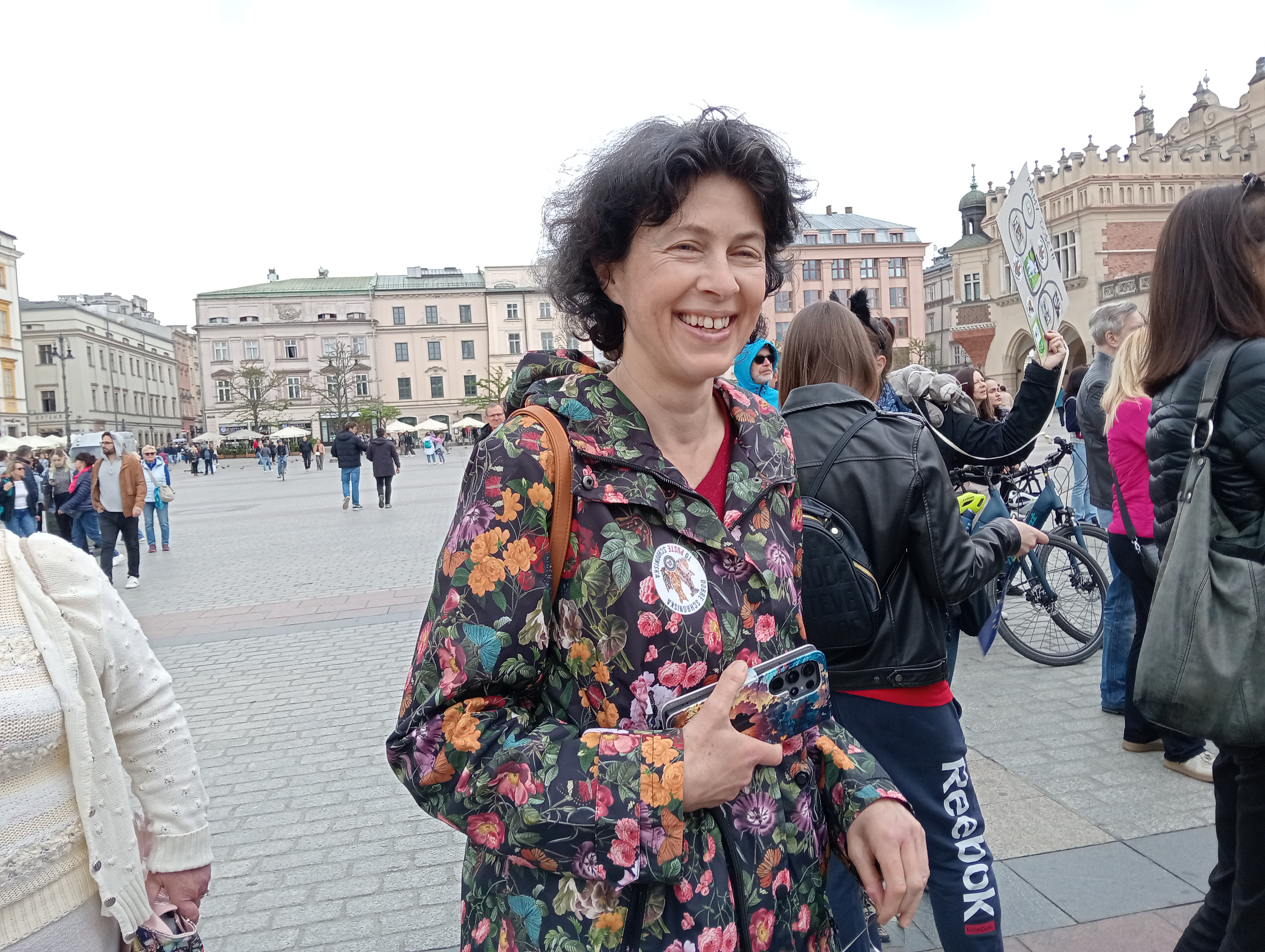
- Joanna Hańderek at the Main Square in Krakow, at a protest in defense of animal rights, May 2026
- Born: 22 June 1974 (age 51)
- Citizenship: Polish
- Occupations: Philosopher and academic
- Website: Home page

Joanna Hańderek (born 22 June 1974) is a Polish philosopher of culture, associate professor at the Jagiellonian University, opinion journalist, activist and politician.

== Biography ==
=== Academic work ===
In 2002 she obtained a PhD in humanities at the Faculty of Philosophy of the Jagiellonian University, on the basis of the work Suffering and Time. An attempt to analyze the suffering-time relationship based on the views of Emmanuel Lévinas, supervised by Beata Szymańska. In 2012, she obtained habilitation in humanities. She is an associate professor at the Jagiellonian University. She was the deputy director for student affairs at the Institute of Philosophy of the Jagiellonian University.

She published two monographs and a number of articles in philosophical journals, including in the Kwartalnik Filozoficzny (Philosophical Quarterly). She specializes in contemporary philosophy, philosophy of culture, in particular in the issues of postcolonialism, globalization, multiculturalism and social exclusion. She is a member of the editorial board of the Racje quarterly.

Since 2013, she has been the co-organizer of the conference Culture of exclusion? (eight editions by 2020). She has been the mentor of two sections of the Scientific Society of Students of Philosophy of the Jagiellonian University (section of philosophy of culture and section of the eco-ethics).

=== Social and political activity ===
She is the founder of the Rewersy Kultury Association, which works for the inclusion of the excluded people. She is a member of the Council of the Congress of Women Association (Kongres Kobiet), the Humanist Society (Towarzystwo Humanistyczne) and the Congress of Secularism (Kongres Świeckości), which advocates the separation of church and state.

She co-organized the march against fascism in Krakow. She also participated in the Black Protest.

In the 2019 parliamentary elections in Poland, she ran for a seat in the Sejm from the list of the Democratic Left Alliance (under the agreement of left-wing parties) in the Kraków constituency, receiving 2,734 votes.

=== Opinion journalism ===
Together with Radosław Czarnecki, she is the co-author of the series of vlogs about religion, atheism and their cultural significance in rationalalista.tv.

=== Personal life ===
She is an atheist.

== Books ==
- Czas i spotkanie. Wokół koncepcji czasu Emmanuela Lévinasa. Kraków: Collegium Columbinum. 2006.
- Metamorfozy i muzea. Kraków: Wydawnictwo Uniwersytetu Jagiellońskiego. 2010.
