= Kraków Book of the Month Award =

Polish literary award (established in 1995)

Kraków Book of the Month Award was established in 1995 by Śródmiejski Ośrodek Kultury w Krakowie (later renamed Krakowskie Forum Kultury).

== Jury ==
From September 2021 Krzysztof A. Zajas has been chief of the jury (he became a jury member in 2019). Other members of the jury include: Magdalena Huzarska-Szumiec (from 2025), Wacław Krupiński, Michał Koza (from 2025), Justyna Nowicka (from 2022), Janusz Paluch, Agnieszka Staniszewska-Mól (from 2021), Łukasz Wojtusik (from 2024), and Jarosław Fazan (from 2023).

== Recipients ==
=== 1995 ===
- February 1995 – Kazimierz Olszański – Niepospolity ród Kossaków
- March 1995 – Kazimierz Biculewicz – Mrówka muzyczna
- April 1995 – Maria Rydlowa – Listy Stanisława Wyspiańskiego do Józefa Mehoffera, Henryka Opieńskiego, Tadeusza Stryjeńskiego
- May 1995 – Jacek Żakowski, Józef Tischner, Adam Michnik – Między Panem a Plebanem
- September 1995 – Michał Rożek – Wawel i Skałka. Panteony polskie
- November 1995 – Oficyna Literacka – Szara seria
- December 1995 – Jan Błoński – Wszystkie sztuki Sławomira Mrożka

=== 1996 ===
- February 1996 – Tadeusz Kwiatkowski – Panopticum
- March 1996 – Leszek Długosz – Z tego co jest
- April 1996 – Jacek Popiel – Dramat a teatr polski dwudziestolecia międzywojennego
- June 1996 – Czesław Miłosz – Legendy współczesności
- September 1996 – Krystyna Zbijewska – Jaroszewska – legenda teatru
- October 1996 – Małgorzata Sugiera – Dramaturgia Sławomira Mrożka
- November 1996 – Jan Adamczewski – Mała Encyklopedia Krakowa
- December 1996 – Jan Ostrowski – Mistrzowie malarstwa polskiego

=== 1997 ===
- January 1997 – Elżbieta Zechenter-Spławińska – Czapka niewidka
- March 1997 – Leszek Aleksander Moczulski – Elegie o weselu i radosne smutki
- April 1997 – Jan Józef Szczepański – Jeszcze nie wszystko
- May 1997 – Bronisław Łagowski – Szkice antyspołeczne
- June 1997 – Grzegorz Niziołek – Sobowtór i utopia. Teatr Krystiana Lupy
- October 1997 – Kronika Krakowa
- November 1997 – Wydawnictwo Baran i Suszczyński – The series of poetry volumes

=== 1998 ===
- January 1998 – Józef Tischner – Historia filozofii po góralsku
- February 1998 – Wydawnictwo Literackie – Dzieje Krakowa v. 4. Kraków w latach 1918–1939
- March 1998 – Krzysztof Pleśniarowicz – Kantor
- April 1998 – Jerzy Pilch – Tysiąc spokojnych miast
- May 1998 – Tadeusz Nyczek – 22 razy Szymborska

=== 1999 ===
- March 1999 – Stanisław Lem – Bomba megabitowa
- May 1999 – Ireneusz Kania – Muttavali. Księga wypisów starobuddyjskich
- October 1999 – Krzysztof Lisowski – 33 zapewnienia o miłości do świata
- November 1999 – Susana Osorio-Mrożek – Meksyk od kuchni. Książka niekucharska
- December 1999 – Julian Kornhauser – Postscriptum. Notatnik krytyczny

=== 2000 ===
- March 2000 – Aleksander Fiut – Być (albo nie być) środkowoeuropejczykiem
- April 2000 – Tadeusz Ulewicz – Iter romano-italicum polonorum, czyli o związkach umysłowo-kulturalnych Polski z Włochami
- May 2000 – Krystyna Czerni – Rezerwat sztuki. Tropami artystów polskich XX wieku
- June 2000 – Wydawnictwo WAM – Henryk Fross, Franciszek Sowa, Księga imion i świętych
- September 2000 – Andrzej Romanowski – Młoda Polska wileńska
- October 2000 – Ludwik Jerzy Kern – Moje abecadłowo
- November 2000 – Ryszard Sadaj – Ławka pod kasztanem
- December 2000 – Wydawnictwo Naukowe PWN – Encyklopedia Krakowa

=== 2001 ===
- January 2001 – Adam Małkiewicz – Theoria et Praxis. Studia z dziejów sztuki nowożytnej i jej teorii
- February 2001 – Józef Baran – Dom z otwartymi ścianami
- March 2001 – Andrzej Borowski – Słownik Sarmatyzmu
- April 2001 – Beata Szymańska – Anioły mojej ulicy
- June 2001 – Henryk Markiewicz – Boy Żeleński
- September 2001 – Stella Müller-Madej – Dziewczynka z Listy Schindlera
- September 2001 – Roma Ligocka – Dziewczynka w czerwonym płaszczyku
- October 2001 – Ewa Lipska – Sklepy zoologiczne
- November 2001 – Joanna Olczak-Ronikier – W ogrodzie pamięci
- December 2001 – Wydawnictwo Fogra – Wielka Historia Polski, edited by Stanisław Grodziski

=== 2002 ===
- January 2002 – Maria Podraza-Kwiatkowska – Wolność i transcendencja. Studia i eseje o Młodej Polsce
- February 2002 – Stanisław Rodziński – Obrazy czasu
- March 2002 – Halina Kwiatkowska – Porachunki z pamięcią
- April 2002 – Tadeusz Chrzanowski – Polska sztuka sakralna
- May 2002 – Stanisław M. Jankowski – Czterdziestu co godzinę
- September 2002 – Mieczysław Porębski – Polskość jako sytuacja
- October 2002 – Stanisław Musiał – Dwanaście koszy ułomków
- November 2002 – Władysław Stróżewski – O wielkości. Szkice o filozofii człowieka
- December 2002 – Andrzej Chwalba – Dzieje Krakowa v. 5. Kraków w latach 1939–1945
- December 2002 – Andrzej Szczeklik – Katharsis. O uzdrowicielskiej mocy natury i sztuki

=== 2003 ===
- January 2003 – Adam Bujak – Skarby klasztorów
- February 2003 – Kazimierz Walasz – Atlas ptaków zimujących Małopolski
- March 2003 – Jerzy Jarzębski – Wszechświat Lema
- April 2003 – Dorota Terakowska – Ono
- May 2003 – Ewa Kozakiewicz – Opowieści fotografistów
- June 2003 – Maria Rostworowska – Portret za mgłą. Opowieść o Oldze Boznańskiej
- August 2003 – Andrzej Warzecha – Zielony ryzykant
- September 2003 – Małgorzata Słomczyńska-Pierzchalska – Nie mogłem być inny. Zagadka Macieja Słomczyńskiego
- October 2003 – Adam Zagajewski – Powrót
- November 2003 – Teresa Walas – Zrozumieć swój czas. Kultura polska po komunizmie
- December 2003 – Tadeusz Lubelski – Encyklopedia kina

=== 2004 ===
- January 2004 – Janusz Cisek – Józef Piłsudski w Krakowie
- February 2004 – Arkadiusz Baron, Henryk Pietras – Dokumenty Soborów Powszechnych
- March 2024 – Wojciech Kuczok – Gnój
- April 2024 – Wojciech Kawiński – Ciało i duch
- May 2004 – Piotr Krasny – Architektura cerkiewna na ziemiach ruskich Rzeczypospolitej 1594–1914
- June 2004 – Katarzyna Zimmerer – Zamordowany świat. Losy Żydów w Krakowie 1939–1945
- September 2004 – Stanisław Waltoś – Na tropach doktora Fausta i inne szkice
- November 2004 – Jan Woleński – Granice niewiary
- December 2004 – Sławomir Mrożek – Jak zostałem filmowcem

=== 2005 ===
- January 2005 – Sławomir Shuty – Zwał
- February 2005 – Jan Michalik – Dzieje teatru w Krakowie 1865–1893. Instytucja artystyczna
- March 2005 – Ryszard Krynicki – Kamień, szron
- April 2005 – Bogdan Szlachta – Słownik społeczny
- May 2005 – Kazimierz Kuczman – Renesansowe głowy wawelskie
- August 2005 – Anna Szałapak – Legendy i tajemnice Krakowa
- September 2005 – Stanisław Bortnowski – Przewodnik po sztuce uczenia literatury
- October 2005 – Wiesław Boryś – Słownik etymologiczny języka polskiego
- November 2005 – Agnieszka Partridge, Rafał Korzeniowski – Otwórzcie bramy pamięci. Cmentarze wojenne z lat 1914–1918 w Małopolsce
- December 2005 – Jerzy Gadomski – Jan Wielki. Krakowski malarz z drugiej połowy XV wieku

=== 2006 ===
- January 2006 – Eryk Ostrowski – Muzyka na wzgórzu
- February 2006 – Adam Ziemianin – Makatki
- March 2006 – Andrzej Janusz Nowakowski – Sławomir Mrożek
- April 2006 – Marek Skwarnicki – Wygnani z raju
- May 2006 – Stanisława Opalińska – Józef Brodowski. Malarz i rysownik starego Krakowa
- June 2006 – Waldemar Komorowski, Iwona Kęder – Ikonografia Kościoła Dominikanów i ulicy Grodzkiej w Krakowie
- September 2006 – Adam Kulawik, Jerzy S. Ossowski – Dzieło i życie Konstantego Ildefonsa Gałczyńskiego
- October 2006 – Andrzej Gowarzewski – Cracovia. 100 lat prawdziwej historii
- November 2006 – Marcin Świetlicki – Muzyka środka

=== 2007 ===
- February 2007 – Walery Pisarek – Słownik terminologii medialnej
- March 2007 – Adam Gryczyński – Czas zatrzymany. Fotografie z lat 1883-1963 z terenów Nowej Huty i okolic oraz wybór tekstów
- April 2007 – Piotr Marecki – Tekstylia bis. Słownik młodej polskiej kultury
- June 2007 – Marta Wyka – Przypisy do życia
- August 2007 – Jan Marian Małecki – Historia Krakowa dla każdego
- September 2007 – Łukasz Orbitowski – Tracę ciepło
- October 2007 – Leszek Mazan – Polska-Praga, czyli dlaczego Matejko lubił knedle
- November 2007 – Piotr Sztompka – Zaufanie: fundament społeczeństwa
- December 2007 – Jerzy Korczak – Oswajanie strachu

=== 2008 ===
- January 2008 – Leon Knabit, Joachim Badeni – Sekrety mnichów, czyli sprawdzone przepisy na szczęśliwe życie
- February 2008 – Aleksander B. Skotnicki – Oskar Schindler w oczach uratowanych przez siebie Żydów
- March 2008 – Krzysztof Maćkowski – Raport Badeni
- April 2008 – Jan Kracik – W Galicji trzeźwiejącej, krwawej, pobożnej
- May 2008 – Anna Skoczylas – Wędrować po obłokach
- June 2008 – Marta Stebnicka – Polowanie na wachlarze
- September 2008 – Michał Heller – Podglądanie wszechświata
- October 2008 – Jolanta Stefko – Omnis moriar
- November 2008 – Andrzej Mleczko – Seks, mydło i powidło
- December 2008 – Jacek Woźniakowski – Ze wspomnień szczęściarza

=== 2009 ===
- January 2009 – Waldemar Komorowski, Aldona Sudacka – Rynek Główny w Krakowie
- February 2009 – Mieczysław Tomaszewski – Penderecki. Bunt i wyzwolenie
- March 2009 – Jerzy Stuhr – Stuhrowie. Historie rodzinne
- April 2009 – Adam Kawa – Sonety polskie
- May 2009 – Antoni Krupa – Miasto błękitnych nut…, czyli historia krakowskiego jazzu i nie tylko
- June 2009 – Jerzy Franczak – Przymierzalnia
- September 2009 – Jerzy Skrobot – Kształty pamięci. Rzecz o Marianie Koniecznym
- October 2009 – Krystyna Szlaga – Poezje wybrane
- November 2009 – Magdalena Bielska – Wakacje, widmo

=== 2010 ===
- January 2010 – Aniela Agata – SM. smak młodości
- February 2010 – Jerzy Nowak – Książka o miłości
- March 2010 – Katarzyna Turaj-Kalińska – Bracia Strach i inne opowiadania
- April 2010 – Wydawnictwo Austeria – Klezmer: opowieść o życiu Leopolda Kozłowskiego Kleinmana by Jacek Cygan
- May 2010 – Andrzej Kazimierz Banach – Kariery zawodowe studentów Uniwersytetu Jagiellońskiego pochodzenia chłopskiego z lat 1860/1861–1917/1918
- June 2010 – Marcin Fabiański – Złoty Kraków
- September 2010 – Wiesław Aleksander Wójcik – Sabała
- October 2010 – Maria Dziedzic (ed.) – Warsztaty krakowskie 1913–1926
- November 2010 – Franciszek Ziejka – Serce Polski: szkice krakowskie
- December 2010 – Andrzej Betlej – Sibi, Deo, Posteritati: Jabłonowscy a sztuka w XVIII wieku

=== 2011 ===
- January 2011 – Jerzy Vetulani – Mózg: fascynacje, problemy, tajemnice
- February 2011 – Jacek Dukaj – Król bólu i inne powieści
- March 2011 – Urszula Bęczkowska – Karol Kremer i krakowski urząd budownictwa w latach 1837–1860
- April 2011 – Jan Szczepaniak – Duchowieństwo diecezji krakowskiej w XVIII wieku: studium prozopograficzne
- May 2011 – Andrzej Franaszek – Miłosz: biografia
- June 2011 – Andrzej Zoll – Zollowie, opowieść rodzinna
- September 2011 – Mikołaj Łoziński – Książka
- October 2011 – Andrzej Janusz Nowakowski – Blask: Ołtarz Mariacki Wita Stwosza
- November 2011 – Karolina Grodziska (in cooperation with Agnieszka Rudnik) – Krakowianki zapomniane: o niezwykłych paniach pochowanych na Cmentarzu Rakowickim 1803–1920
- December 2011 – Wydawnictwo Literackie – Listy Lem – Mrożek

=== 2012 ===
- January 2012 – Zbigniew Wodecki – Zbigniew Wodecki: pszczoła, Bach i skrzypce
- February 2012 – Kultura studencka: zjawisko – twórcy – instytucje, edited by Edward Chudziński
- March 2012 – Stanisław Rodziński – Autoportret malarza
- April 2012 – Stanisław Grodziski – Rzeczpospolita Krakowska, jej lata i ludzie
- May 2012 – Krzysztof Meyer – Mistrzowie i przyjaciele
- June 2012 – Józefa Hennelowa – Otwarty, bo powszechny: o Kościele, który może boleć
- September 2012 – Agnieszka Biedrzycka – Kalendarium Lwowa 1918–1939
- October 2012 – Marek Sołtysik – Jak upadają wielcy
- November 2012 – Stanisław M. Jankowski – Dziewczęta w maciejówkach
- December 2012 – Łukasz Maciejewski – Aktorki. Spotkania

=== 2013 ===
- January 2013 – Anna Mateja – Co zdążysz zrobić to zostanie: portret Jerzego Turowicza
- February 2013 – Diana Poskuta-Włodek – Dzieje teatru w Krakowie 1918–1939. Zawodowe teatry dramatyczne
- April 2013 – Adam Ziemianin – Z nogi na nogę
- May 2013 – Grzegorz Wołoszyn – Poliptyk
- June 2013 – Rzecz o roku 1863. Uniwersytet Jagielloński wobec powstania styczniowego, edited by Andrzej A. Zięba
- September 2013 – Jadwiga Malina – Od rozbłysku
- October 2013 – Piotr Wasilewski – Dwie dekady polskiej reklamy. 1990–2010
- November 2013 – Marian Stala – Blisko wiersza. 30 interpretacji
- December 2013 – Adam Wodnicki – Arelate. Obrazki z niemiejsca

=== 2014 ===
- January 2014 – Zbigniew Bela – O starożytnych antidotach, złotych pigułkach i innych sprawach związanych z historią farmacji
- February 2014 – Barbara Zbroja – Architektura międzywojennego Krakowa 1918–1939. Budynki, ludzie, historia
- March 2014 – Andrzej Witko – Sewilskie malarstwo siedemnastego wieku. Od wizji mistycznych do martwych natur
- April 2014 – Ewa Elżbieta Nowakowska – Trzy ołówki
- May 2014 – Ziemowit Szczerek – Przyjdzie Mordor i nas zje czyli Tajna historia Słowian
- June 2014 – Stefania Krzysztofowicz-Kozakowska – Sztuka II RP
- September 2014 – Ewa Szawul – Burza w mózgu
- October 2014 – Klementyna Żurowska – Z Leszczkowa w świat
- November 2014 – Anna Woźniakowska – Czy Kraków zasługuje na Operę?
- December 2014 – Tomasz Pindel – Mario Vargas Llosa. Biografia

=== 2015 ===
- January 2015 – Paweł Daniel Zalewski – Bez pamięci
- February 2015 – Jolanta Antecka – Teodora moja miłość. Życie codzienne Jana i Teodory Matejków (Note: Book about Jan and Teodora Matejko.)
- March 2015 – Kalina Błażejowska – Uparte serce. Biografia Poświatowskiej
- April 2015 – Maria Baścik – Środowisko przyrodnicze Krakowa. Zasoby – ochrona – kształtowanie
- May 2015 – Adam Kulawik – Poezja to jest złoty szerszeń. Rzecz o poematach K. I. Gałczyńskiego
- June 2015 – Stanisław Balbus – Zosia
- September 2015 – Łukasz Mańczyk – Biserka (Note: Book about Biserka Rajčić.)
- October 2015 – Maryla Szymiczkowa – Tajemnica Domu Helclów
- November 2015 – Pius Czesław Bosak – Leksykon wszystkich postaci biblijnych
- December 2015 – Agnieszka Kosińska – Miłosz w Krakowie

=== 2016 ===
- January 2016 – Krzysztof Orzechowski – Podróż do kresu pamięci
- February 2016 – Bogdan Podgórski – W poszukiwaniu piękna. Bronisława Rychter-Janowska 1868–1953
- March 2016 – Maria Wilczek-Krupa – Kilar. Geniusz o dwóch twarzach
- April 2016 – Bożena Kostuch – Kolor i blask. Ceramika architektoniczna oraz mozaiki w Krakowie i Małopolsce po 1945 roku
- May 2016 – Agnieszka Stabro – Ciała lekkie jak puste walizki
- June 2016 – Zośka Papużanka – On
- September 2016 – Małgorzata Lebda – Matecznik
- October 2016 – Katarzyna Siwiec – Święty Ludwik z ulicy Strzeleckiej
- November 2016 – Ewa Ryżewska-Kulawik – Inny świat
- December 2016 – Barbara Gawryluk – Wanda Chotomska. Nie mam nic do ukrycia

=== 2018 ===
- September 2018 – Donata Ochmann, Renata Przybylska – Powiedziane po krakowsku. Słownik regionalizmów krakowskich

=== 2020 ===
- April 2020 – Michał Milczarek – Donikąd. Podróże na skraj Rosji

=== 2021 ===
- May 2021 – Tomasz Gwiazda – Tempus edax rerum. Utracone kościoły Krakowa wzniesione w okresie od X do XVIII
- November 2021 – Piotr Oczko – Pozdrowienia z Mokum. 21 opowieści o Holandii

=== 2023 ===
- March 2023 – Aleksandra Herzyk – Wolność albo śmierć
- April 2023 – Emilia Padoł – Rodziewicz-ówna. Gorąca dusza
- May 2023 – Edyta Gawron, Michał Galas et al. – Nie tylko Kroke. Historia Żydów krakowskich
- June 2023 – Joanna Oparek – Małe powinności
- September 2023 – Agnieszka Bukowczan-Rzeszut, Barbara Faron, Karol Ossowski – W alchemii, w łaźni i pod szubienicą. Historyczny spacer po dawnym Krakowie
- October 2023 – Cezary Łazarewicz – Na Szewskiej. Sprawa Stanisława Pyjasa
- November 2023 – Magdalena Bielska – Poradnik dla niedawno zmarłych
- December 2023 – Andrzej Chwalba – Wisła. Biografia rzeki

=== 2024 ===
- January 2024 – Ishbel Szatrawska – Toń
- February 2024 – Michał Sobol – Trasy przelotów
- March 2024 – Katarzyna Kobylarczyk – Ciałko. Hiszpania kradnie swoje dzieci
- April 2024 – Agata Jabłońska – Księżyc Grzybiarek
- May 2024 – Anna Kaszuba-Dębska – Przybyszewska / Pająkówna. Głuchy krzyk
- June 2024 – Magda Huzarska-Szumiec – Niusia z Listy Schindlera. Historia ocalenia
- September 2024 – Rafał Matyja – Kraków – miasto zero
- October 2024 – Bettina Bereś – Awangarda między kuchnią a łazienką. Maria Pinińska-Bereś i Jerzy Bereś'
- December 2024 – Piotr Oczko – Suknia i sztalugi. Historie dawnych malarek

=== 2025 ===
- January 2025 – Ewa Mańkowska – Hanna i Dorota
- February 2025 – Beata Guczalska – Konrad Swinarski. Biografia ukryta
- March 2025 – Edward Pasewicz – Czarne wesele
- April 2025 – Andrzej Dybczak – Las duchów
- May 2025 – Michał Choiński – The New Yorker. Biografia pisma, które zmieniło Amerykę
- June 2025 – Jerzy Franczak – Zemsta wyobraźni
- September 2025 – Tomasz Pindel – Śmierci i inni święci. Ameryka łacińska i jej wierzenia
- October 2025 – Marcin Maciejowski – Rysunki wawelskie
- November 2025 – Małgorzata Lebda – Dunaj. Chyłe pola
- December 2025 – Marcin Wilk – Jedyna. Biografia Karoliny Lanckorońskiej

=== 2026 ===
- January 2026 – Zośka Papużanka – Solo
- February 2026 – Piotr Legutko – Magnat z Pałacu Prasy. Opowieść o Marianie Dąbrowskim, twórcy największego koncernu medialnego II RP
- March 2026 – Marcin Oskar Czarnik – Trzy dni, trzy noce
- April 2026 – Bernard Gromek – Revolterium
- May 2026 – Marzena Florkowska and Marek Florkowski – Odkrywanie Krakowa. Wszystkie pasje Ambrożego Grabowskiego
- June 2026 – Paulina Małochleb – Mięśnie mam od miłości. O macierzyństwie
