= Bronisław Łagowski =

Polish political scientist (born 1937)

Bronisław Łagowski (born 8 February 1937) is a Polish professor emeritus of the Jagellonian University and Pedagogical University of Kraków, expert in political philosophy and essayist.

In 2000 he was awarded Officer's Cross of the Order of Polonia Restituta, one of the highest Polish orders.

== Publications ==
He is an author of numerous publications in press ("Tygodnik Powszechny", "Gazeta Wyborcza", "Zdanie", "Polityka", "Przegląd", "Krytyka Polityczna").

=== Books ===
- Filozofia polityczna Maurycego Mochnackiego ('Political philosophy of Maurycy Mochnacki'), Wydawnictwo Literackie. Kraków 1981, ISBN 8308004059.
- Co jest lepsze od prawdy? ('What is better than truth?'), Wydawnictwo Literackie. Kraków 1986, ISBN 8308013791.
- Liberalna kontrrewolucja ('Liberal counter-revolution'), Adam Smith Centre 1994, ISBN 83-901409-4-2.
- Szkice antyspołeczne ('Antisocial sketches'), Księgarnia Akademicka, ISBN 83-86575-61-1.
- Łagodny protest obywatelski ('Gentle cvic protest'), Księgarnia Akademicka, ISBN 83-7188-371-4.
- Duch i bezduszność III Rzeczypospolitej. Rozważania. ('Spirit and heartlerssness of the Third Republic'), Universitas, ISBN 83-242-0628-0.
- Pochwała politycznej bierności ('In praise of political pssivity'), Wydawnictwo Sprawy Polityczne. Warsaw 2008, ISBN 9788361384014.
- Teka Łagowskiego. Księga Jubileuszowa z okazji 70. urodzin Profesora Bronisława Łagowskiego (an anniversary book on Łagowski's 70th birthday), Księgarnia Akademicka. Kraków 2008, ISBN 9788371881381.
- Symbole pożarły rzeczywistość ('Symbols devoured the reality'), Universitas. Kraków 2011, ISBN 97883-242-1342-9.
- Polska chora na Rosję ('Poland's sickness Russia') Oratio Recta. Warsaw 2016, ISBN 978-83-64407-12-3.
- Fałszywa historia, błędna polityka ('False history, wrong politics'), Oratio Recta. Warsaw 2017, ISBN 978-83-64407-16-1.
- Państwo znikąd ('A state from nowhere'), Oratio Recta. Warsaw 2017, ISBN 978-83-64407-19-2.

== Awards and recognition ==
- Kraków Book of the Month Award (May 1997)
- Officer's Cross of the Order of Polonia Restituta(2000),
- Badge "Honoris Gratia" from President of the City of Kraków (2007)
- Medal of the ecumenic foundation Tolerancja.
