= Kalina Błażejowska =

Polish journalist and writer (born 1987)

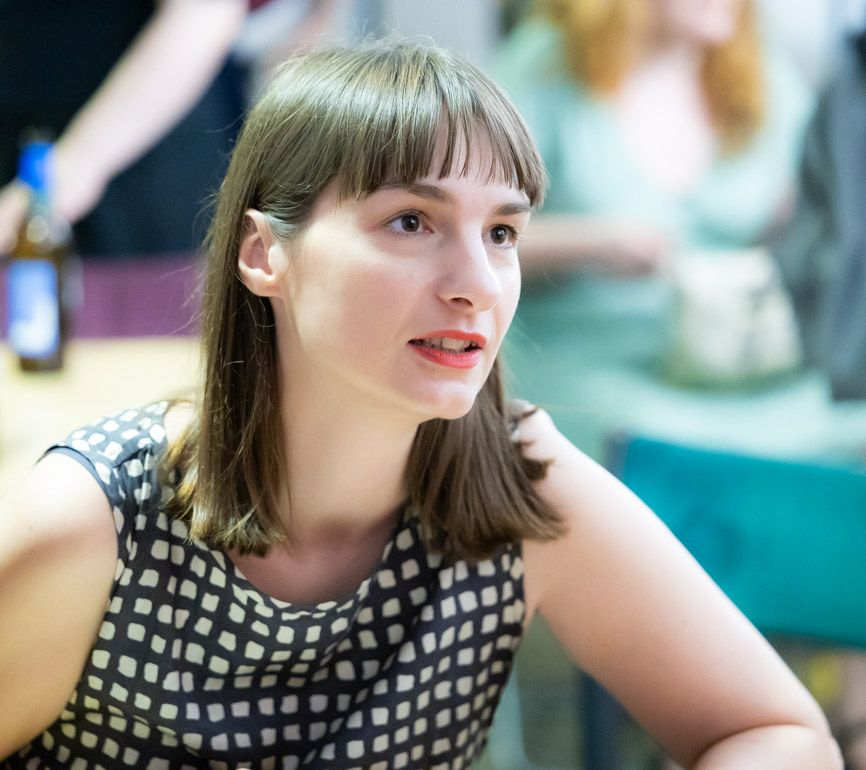
- Kalina Błażejowska, 2026
- Born: 1987 (age 38–39)
- Occupations: Journalist, writer

Kalina Błażejowska (born 1987) is a journalist and non-fiction writer.

== Biography ==
She graduated in film studies and journalism from the Jagiellonian University. From 2013 to 2016, she was an editor of Tygodnik Powszechny.

In November 2025, she accused Jarosław Molenda of plagiarism, claiming that his book Zbrodnia w Kobierzynie contained fragments of her book Bezduszni. Zapomniana zagłada chorych [The Soulless: The Forgotten Extermination of the Sick].

== Books ==
- Uparte serce. Biografia Poświatowskiej (2014)

Extended edition: Uparte serce. Biografia Haliny Poświatowskiej (2026)

- Bezduszni. Zapomniana zagłada chorych (2023)

== Awards ==
She was nominated for the Barbara Łopieńska Award, the MediaTory Award, and the Małopolska Journalists' Award.

For her book Uparte serce. Biografia Poświatowskiej, she was a finalist for the Gryfia Literary Award and received the Book of Spring title from the Poznański Przegląd Nowości Wydawniczych and the Kraków Book of the Month award (March 2015).

For her book Bezduszni. Zapomniana zagłada chorych (The Soulless: Forgotten Extermination of the Sick), she received the Polityka Historical Award, the Witold Pilecki International Award, the Kazimierz Moczarski Ołówek Award from the Młodzieżowe Kluby Historyczne, the KLIO Award, second degree, and was nominated for the Kazimierz Moczarski Award and the Złota Róża 2024 award.
