= Małgorzata Lebda =

Polish poet, writer, and photographer (born 1985)

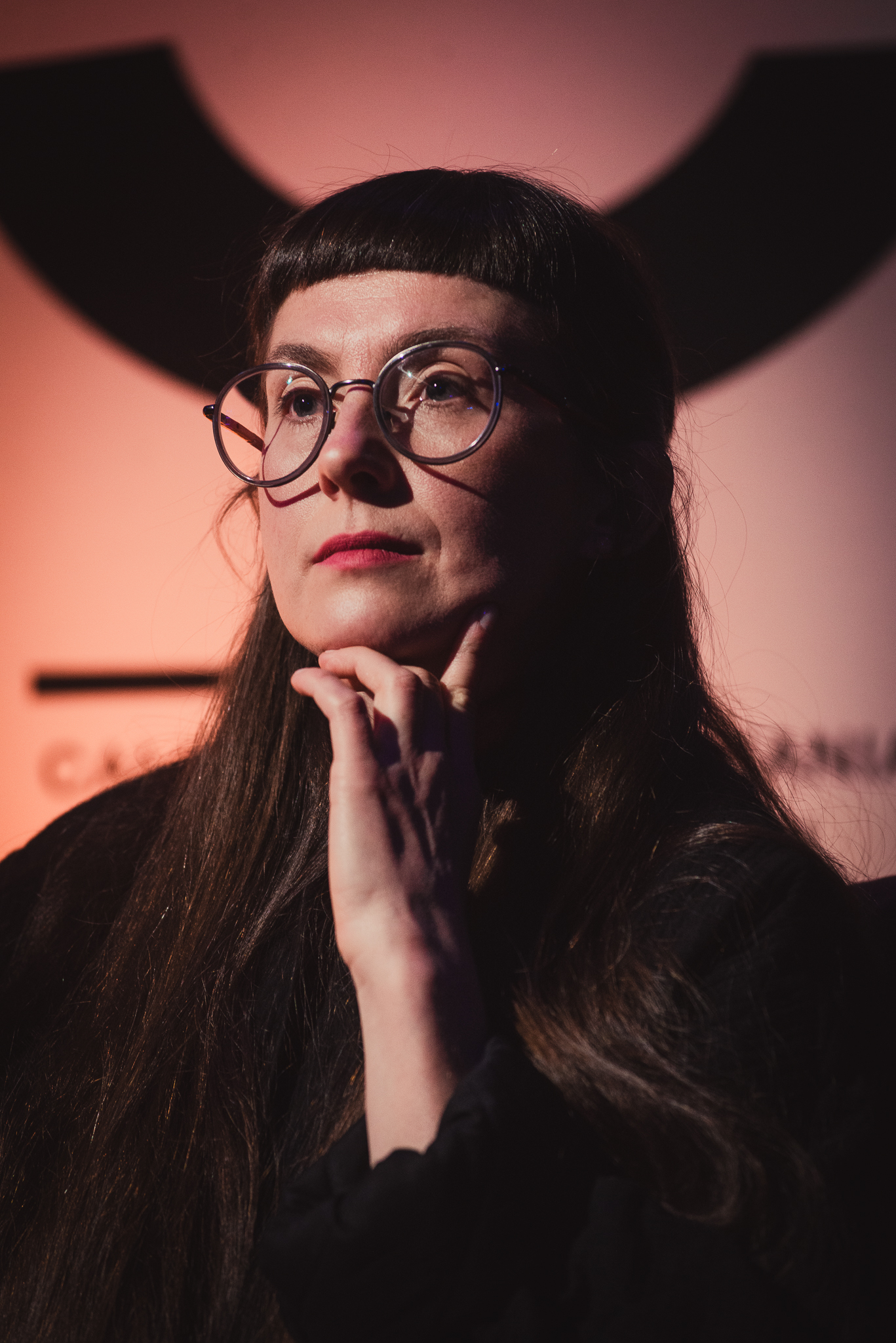
- Małgorzata Lebda in 2025
- Born: 23 August 1985 (age 40); Nowy Sącz
- Citizenship: Polish
- Occupations: Poet, writer, photographer

Małgorzata Lebda (born 23 August 1985) is a Polish poet, writer and photographer.

== Biography ==
She obtained doctorate in 2014 at the Pedagogical University in Kraków upon the dissertation Utajona mowa obrazu. Rola poetyki w interpretacji fotografii współczesnej. Wybrane przykłady, supervised by Rafał Piotr Solewski.

== Selected works ==
=== Poetry books ===
- Otwarta na 77 stronie. Kraków: Wydawnictwo Towarzystwa Słowaków w Polsce. 2006. Poetry sheet.
- Tropy. Gniezno: Zeszyty Poetyckie. 2009. ISBN 978-83-926993-5-4.
- Granica lasu. Poznań: Wojewódzka Biblioteka Publiczna i Centrum Animacji Kultury w Poznaniu. 2013. ISBN 978-83-62717-92-7.
- Matecznik. Poznań: Wojewódzka Biblioteka Publiczna i Centrum Animacji Kultury w Poznaniu. 2016.
- Jezik zemlje. Belgrade: Treći Trg. 2017. Translated by Biserka Rajčić.
- Sny uckermӓrkerów. Poznań: Wojewódzka Biblioteka Publiczna i Centrum Animacji Kultury w Poznaniu. 2018.
- Sprawy ziemi. Poznań: Wojewódzka Biblioteka Publiczna i Centrum Animacji Kultury w Poznaniu. 2020. Set of three previously published volumes: Granica lasu, Matecznik and Sny uckermӓrkerów.
- Mer de Glace. Wrocław: Wrocławskie Wydawnictwo Warstwy. 2021.
- Dunaj. Chyłe pola. Wrocław: Wydawnictwo Warstwy. 2025. ISBN 9788367186339.

=== Novels ===
- Łakome. Kraków: Znak. 2023.

== Awards and nominations ==
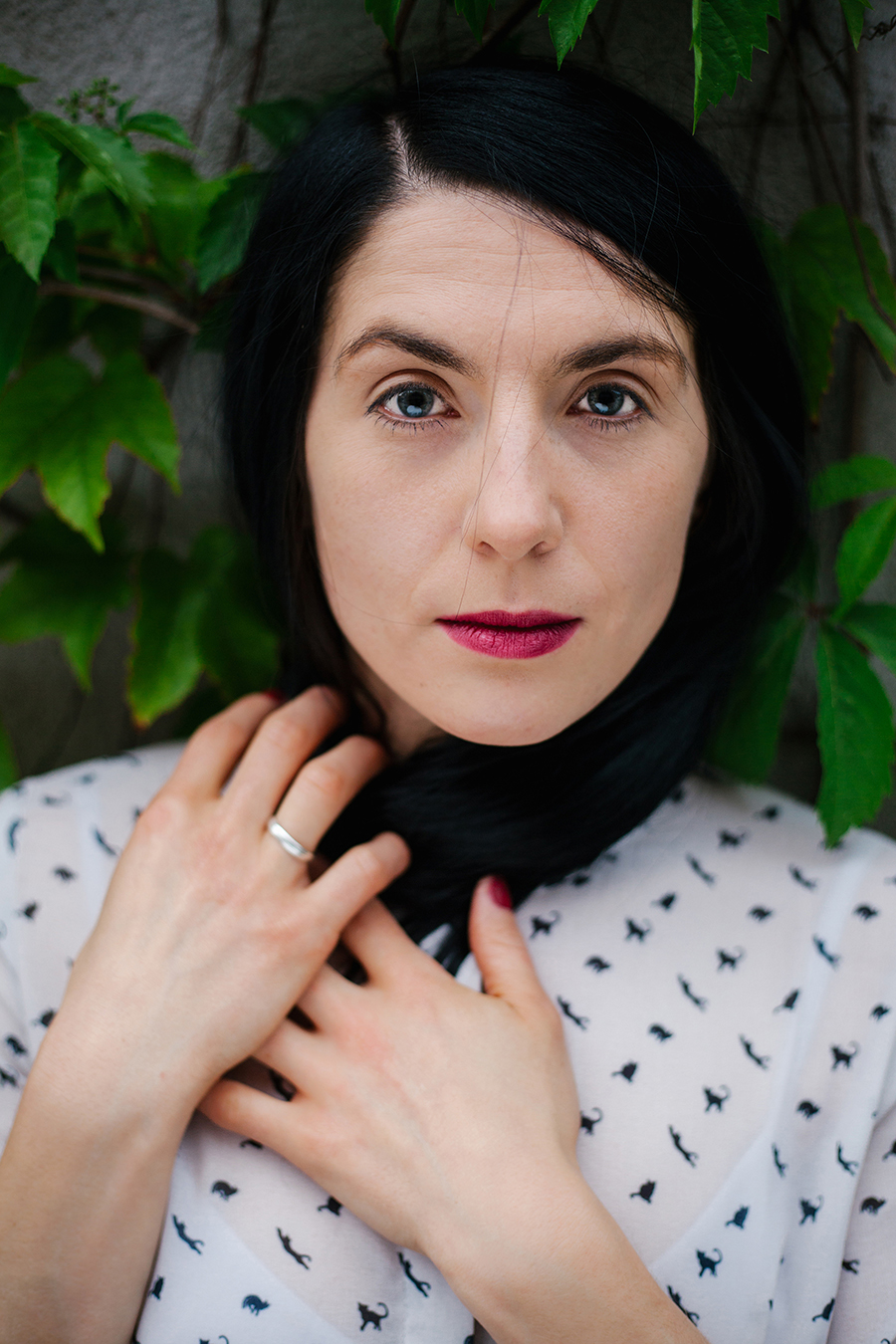
Małgorzata Lebda, 2016

- Nomination for the Orfeusz Prize for the volume Granica lasu (2014)
- Nomination for the Krystyna and Czesław Bednarczyk Award for the volume Granica lasu (2014)
- Kraków Book of the Month Award for the volume Matecznik (September 2016)
- Orfeusz Prize for the volume Matecznik (2017)
- Nomination for the Silesius Poetry Award for the volume Sny uckermӓrkerów (2019)
- Nomination for the Orfeusz Prize for the volume Sny uckermӓrkerów (2019)
- Gdynia Literary Prize for the volume Sny uckermӓrkerów (2019)
- Nomination for the Orfeusz Prize for the volume Mer de Glace (2021)
- Nomination for the Silesius Poetry Award for the volume Mer de Glace (2022)
- Wisława Szymborska Award (2022)
- Angelus Award for Łakome (2024)
- Finalist of the Nike Award for Łakome (2024)
- Kościelski Award for the volume Dunaj. Chyłe pola (2025)
- Kraków Book of the Month Award for Dunaj. Chyłe pola (2025)
