= Stanisław Grodziski =

Polish historian (1929–2020)

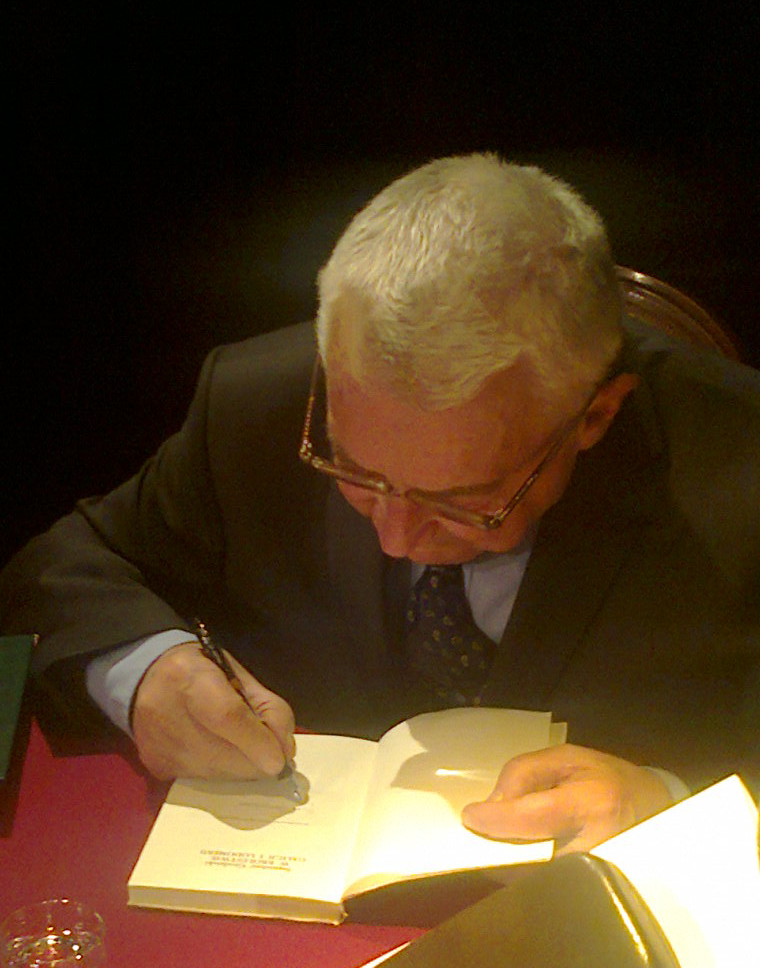
- Stanisław Grodziski, 2012
- Born: 2 January 1929; Prusy
- Died: 30 May 2020 (aged 91)
- Citizenship: Polish
- Education: Jagiellonian University
- Occupation: historian

Stanisław Grodziski (2 January 1929 – 30 May 2020) was a historian, author of source publications, Head of the Department of Polish Legal History at the Jagiellonian University (1970–1978), Dean of the Faculty of Law and Administration of the Jagiellonian University (1978–1981), Vice-Rector of the Jagiellonian University (1987–1990), member and vice-president of the Polish Academy of Arts and Sciences (1994–2000), honorary doctor of the University of Wrocław.

== Biography ==
In 1951 he graduated from the Jagiellonian University. There, in 1959, he obtained doctorate upon dissertation supervised by Adam Vetulani.

His daughter Karolina Grodziska-Ożóg is a historian.

== Books ==
- Ludzie luźni. Studium z historii państwa i prawa polskiego. 1961.
- Obywatelstwo w szlacheckiej Rzeczypospolitej. 1963.
- Historia ustroju społeczno-politycznego Galicji 1772–1848. 1971.
- W Królestwie Galicji i Lodomerii. 1976.
- W obronie czci niewieściej – szkice z dziejów kultury prawnej. 1981. Second edition published in 2000.
- Franciszek Józef I. 1978. Fourth edition published in 2006.
- Sejm krajowy galicyjski 1861–1914. Warszawa: Wydawnictwo Sejmowe. 1992. ISBN 8370590527.
- Wzdłuż Wisły, Dniestru i Zbrucza. Wędrówki po Galicji. 1998.
- Porównawcza historia ustrojów państwowych. 1998.
- Habsburgowie. 1998.
- Polska w latach przełomu 1764–1815. Kraków. 1999. ISBN 8385719350.
- Z dziejów staropolskiej kultury prawnej. 2004.
- Rzeczpospolita Krakowska, jej lata i ludzie. Kraków. 2012. ISBN 9788324216857.
- Klio, córka Mnemosyne, kelnerka z "Kopciuszka". Kraków 1968–1982. 2014. Memoir book. Second edition published in 2018.
- Za trzecim razem. Zapiski uniwersyteckie z lat 1968, '81, 1989. 2017.
- Wkład krakowskiego i ogólnopolskiego środowiska prawniczego w budowę podstaw ustrojowych III Rzeczypospolitej (1980–1994). Projekty i inicjatywy ustawodawcze, ludzie, dokonania i oceny. 2018. Edited by.

== Awards ==
- Kraków Book of the Month Award for the book Rzeczpospolita Krakowska, jej lata i ludzie (April 2012)
