= Ludwik Jerzy Kern =

Polish poet and author (1921–2010)

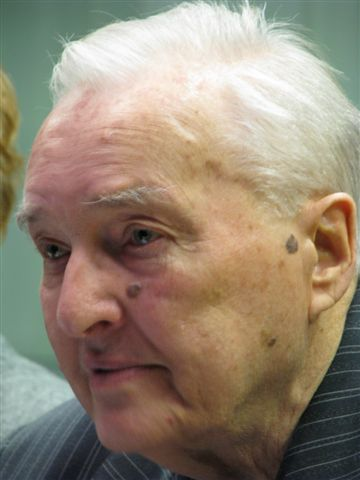
- Ludwik Jerzy Kern, 2008
- Born: 29 December 1921; Łódź
- Died: 29 October 2010 (aged 88); Kraków
- Citizenship: Polish
- Occupations: Poet, author of books for children and young adults

Ludwik Jerzy Kern (29 December 1921 – 29 October 2010) was a poet, author of books for children and young adults, translator and screenwriter.

== Biography ==
The son of Ludwik Kern, a teacher, and Maria née Gertner. In 1939, he passed matura in the A. Zimowski Humanist High School in Łódź. He took part in the September Campaign. During the Nazi occupation, he lived in Warsaw, supporting himself through manual labor.

In 1948, he moved to Kraków, where he started working at the Przekrój weekly.

He was buried in the Avenue of the Meritorious at the Rakowicki Cemetery in Kraków.

== Books ==
- Tu są bajki. Wydawnictwo Literackie. 1953.
- Bajki drugie. Wydawnictwo Literackie. 1954.
- Wolne wnioski. Czytelnik. 1954.
- Do widzenia zwierzęta. Wydawnictwo Literackie. 1956.
- Pierwszy i kilka innych wierszy. Nasza Księgarnia. 1956.
- Menażeria kapitana Ali. Nasza Księgarnia. 1957.
- Wiersze i wierszyki. Iskry. 1957.
- Kapitan Ali i jego pies. Wydawnictwo Literackie. 1959.
- Powrót Ramony. Biblioteka Stańczyka. Iskry. 1961.
- Bajki, bajki, bajki... Wydawnictwo Literackie. 1963.
- Ferdynand Wspaniały. Nasza Księgarnia. 1963.
- Spacer z koniem. Biblioteka Stańczyka. Iskry. 1963.
- Proszę słonia. Nasza Księgarnia. 1964.
- Zbudź się, Ferdynandzie. Nasza Księgarnia. 1965.
- Z Florkiem przez pół świata. Nasza Księgarnia. 1966.
- Zemsta szafy. Biblioteka Stańczyka. Iskry. 1967.

== Awards ==
- Medal of the 10th Anniversary of People's Poland (1955)
- Gold Cross of Merit (1973)
- Meritorious Activist of Culture (1975)
- Medal of the Commission of National Education (1977)
- Knight's Cross of the Order of Polonia Restituta (1980)
- Officer's Cross of the Order of Polonia Restituta (1998)
- Kraków Book of the Month Award for the book Moje abecadłowo (October 2000)
