= The Girl in the Red Coat =

2002 memoir by Roma Ligocka

- Author: Roma Ligocka and Iris Von Finckenstein
- Translator: Margot Bettauer Dembo
- Publisher: St. Martin's Press
- Publication date: September 2002
- Pages: 304
- ISBN: 0-312-28794-1

The Girl in the Red Coat is a memoir by Polish writer Roma Ligocka with Iris von Finckenstein. Written in German as Das Mädchen im roten Mantel, it was translated by Margot Bettauer Dembo and published in English in September 2002 by St. Martin's Press, and in November 2003 in paperback.

The memoir recounts Ligocka's childhood as a Jewish girl living in Nazi-occupied Poland during WWII. She describes her experience during the Holocaust, as well as how those experiences shaped her psychologically later in life. The famous scene in the film Schindler's List, the "girl in the red coat," triggered Ligock's memory of herself wearing a special red coat as a child.

Polish translation Dziewczynka w czerwonym płaszczyku received Kraków Book of the Month Award in September 2001.

== Synopsis ==
The memoir recounts Ligocka's early childhood in the Kraków ghetto during the Nazi occupation. Being Jewish, she and her family were forced to live in the ghetto under constant threat of deportation. Ligocka describes witnessing violence, hiding from the authorities, and the disappearances of various family members. She and her mother were able to escape from the ghetto before it was liquidated. Because non-Jewish Poles found "the little strawberry" in her red coat so cute, they were able to survive in Krakow until the end of the war.

That scene in Schindler's List, the only use of color in the film, prompted Ligocka to confront her own suppressed memories of her life under Nazi occupation, and to write about it to try to come to terms with her past. The memoir alternates between living daily life as a child witnessing violent wartime experiences and the long-term traumatic impacts they left behind.

Beyond recounting her wartime experiences, Ligocka reflects on the lasting emotional and psychological effects of surviving the Holocaust. She describes struggles with identity, memory, and trauma that persisted long after the war ended, shaping her relationships and sense of self into adulthood. The memoir emphasizes how childhood experiences of fear, loss, and displacement do not simply fade with time, but instead continue to influence survivors in complex and often painful ways.

Writing about post-war period, she recalls her friendships with Roman Polanski (her cousin), Ryszard Horowitz and Piotr Skrzynecki.
