= Aleksandra Herzyk =

Polish illustrator, comic book author, writer, activist, and publicist (born 1993)

- Born: 28 August 1993 (age 33)
- Citizenship: Polish
- Education: Jan Matejko Academy of Fine Arts, Jagiellonian University
- Occupations: Illustrator, comic book author, writer and opinion journalist

Aleksandra Herzyk (born 28 August 1993) is an illustrator, comic book author, writer, activist and opinion journalist.

== Biography ==
She graduated from the Academy of Fine Arts in Kraków and with a law degree from the Jagiellonian University. She lives in Kraków.

She has published her comics online. She has also created illustrations and comics for popular science books. In 2022, she debuted with the historical graphic novel Wolność albo śmierć (Freedom or Death), set during the French Revolution. In 2023, she published the reportage Przegryw. Mężczyźni w pułapce gniewu i samotności (Losers: Men Trapped in Anger and Loneliness), co-written by Patrycja Wieczorkiewicz. She wrote the script for the comic book Kiedyś będzie pięknie (Someday Will Be Beautiful), illustrated by Katarzyna Klas (kth).

She has published journalistic texts in Krytyka Polityczna, Magazyn Kontakt, and Noizz.pl. She has collaborated with Amnesty International and the Campaign Against Homophobia. She has been involved in pro-environmental activities, including those supporting nuclear energy. She has identified as a feminist identifying with the asexual community. She was inspired by the Age of Enlightenment. She has spoken critically about body shaming and transphobia.

Since November 2024, she has co-hosted the politically themed vrzenie channel on the streaming platform Twitch, along with Karolina Wiśniowska. She was chosen a juror at the 18th Offeliada Film Festival in Gniezno.

== Books ==
- Wolność albo śmierć. Warszawa: Kultura Gniewu. 2022..
- Marsz. Marcin Bałczewski (co-author). Warszawa: Timof Comics. 2023.
- Przegryw. Mężczyźni w pułapce gniewu i samotności. Patrycja Wieczorkiewicz (co-author). Warszawa: W.A.B. 2023.
- Kiedyś będzie pięknie. Katarzyną Klas (kth) (co-author). Kraków: Krakowskie Biuro Festiwalowe. 2024.

== Accolades ==
- Kraków Book of the Month Award for Wolność i śmierć (March 2023)
- Hestia Journey Literary Award awarded in partnership with the Wisława Szymborska Foundation for Wolność albo śmierć (2023)
