= Piotr Oczko =

Polish scholar of languages (1973–2026)

- Born: 1973
- Died: 15 July 2026 (aged 53)
- Citizenship: Polish
- Education: Jagiellonian University
- Occupations: Academic, teacher, writer, translator
- Employer: Jagiellonian University

Piotr Oczko (1973 – 15 July 2026) was a Polish scholar of Polish, English and Dutch studies, as well as a cultural studies scholar, art historian, translator and professor at the Jagiellonian University.

== Life and work ==
The son of Barbara Oczkowa, Oczko was born in 1973. He graduated in English and Polish philology from the Jagiellonian University, in 1997 and 2000 respectively. In 1997 he received the translation award from the Flemish Ministry of Culture in Brussels, in 2000 a scholarship from the Sasakawa Young Leaders Fellowship Fund, in 2006 a scholarship from the Adam Krzyżanowski Fund, and in 2010 and 2014 the Rector's Prize of the Jagiellonian University.

Oczko obtained doctorate in 2002 (supervised by Andrzej Stanisław Borowski) and habilitation in 2014. In 2022 he obtained the title of professor of art sciences.

His research interests included the literature and culture of Dutch-speaking countries, early Polish, English and German literature, medieval drama, New historicism, issues of evil in culture, national identities and stereotypes, LGBT studies, and art history, including seventeenth-century Dutch genre painting, emblematics, artistic crafts of the 17th-19th centuries, the history of European ceramics – especially Dutch tiles and delftware.

He published in Znak. He was a member of the CODART, international network for curators of art from the Low Countries. He consulted on the conservation-led restoration of the tiles in the Balthasar Fontana Hall at the Pod Gruszką House.

He described himself as “a collector of old junk, a rainbow feminist and vegetarian, with a heart firmly on the left”. Ryszard Nycz described him as “polymath in the humanities”, “versatile, knowledgeable scholar”, “refusing to be confined within disciplinary cages”.

Oczko died on 15 July 2026, at the age of 53.

== Books ==
- Mit Lucyfera. Literackie dzieje Upadłego Anioła od starożytności po wiek XVII. Kraków. 2005.
- W najdroższej Holandyjej… Szkice o siedemnastowiecznym dramacie i kulturze niderlandzkiej. Kraków. 2009.
- Życie i śmierć doktora Fausta, złego czarnoksiężnika, w literaturze angielskiej od wieku XVI po romantyzm. Kraków. 2010.
- Homoseksualność staropolska. Tomasz Nastulczyk (co-author). Kraków. 2012.
- Miotła i krzyż. Kultura sprzątania w dawnej Holandii, albo historia pewnej obsesji. Kraków. 2013.
- Gabinet Farfurowy w Pałacu w Wilanowie. Studium historyczno-ikonograficzne. Jan Pluis (co-author). Warszawa. 2013.
- Holenderskie flizy na dawnych ziemiach polskich i ościennych. Vol. I: Umywalnia na Zamku Wysokim w Malborku. Jej historia i wystrój. Jan Pluis (co-author). Malbork. 2018.
- Holenderskie flizy na dawnych ziemiach polskich i ościennych. Vol. II: Mody i wnętrza. Malbork. 2018.
- Holandia. Książka do pisania. Kraków-Budapeszt-Syrakuzy. 2019.
- Bezem en kruis. De Hollandse schoonmaakcultuur of de geschiedenis van een obsessie. Leiden. 2020.
- Pocztówka z Mokum. 21 opowieści o Holandii. Wydawnictwo Znak. 2021. ISBN 978-83-240-4421-4.
- Suknia i sztalugi. Historie dawnych malarek. Wydawnictwo Znak. 2024.

== Editions ==
- Słownik Sarmatyzmu. Idee, pojęcia, symbole. Andrzej Borowski (co-editor). Kraków. 2001.
- CAMPania – zjawisko campu we współczesnej kulturze. Warszawa. 2008.
- Jakubowski, August Antoni (2013). Wspomnienia polskiego wygnańca/The Remembrances of a Polish Exile. Jarosław Ławski (co-editor). Białystok.
- Widzę rzeki szerokie… Z dziejów literatury niderlandzkiej XIX i XX wieku. Jerzy Koch (co-editor). Poznań. 2018.

== Translations into Polish ==
- van den Vondel, Joost. Lucyfer. 2002, 2007.
- Jezernik, Božidar. Dzika Europa. Bałkany w oczach zachodnich podróżników. 2007.
- Huizinga, Johan. Kultura XVII-wiecznej Holandii. 2008.
- Westerman, Frank. Ararat. 2009.
- Notes amsterdamski. 2016.

Source.

== Awards ==
- Kraków Book of the Month Award for the book Pozdrowienia z Mokum. 21 opowieści o Holandii (November 2021)
- Officer's Cross of the Order of Orange-Nassau (2024)
- Kraków Book of the Month Award for Suknia i sztalugi. Historie dawnych malarek (December 2024)
- Kazimierz Wyka Award (2026)
