= Stare Dobre Małżeństwo =

Polish music group

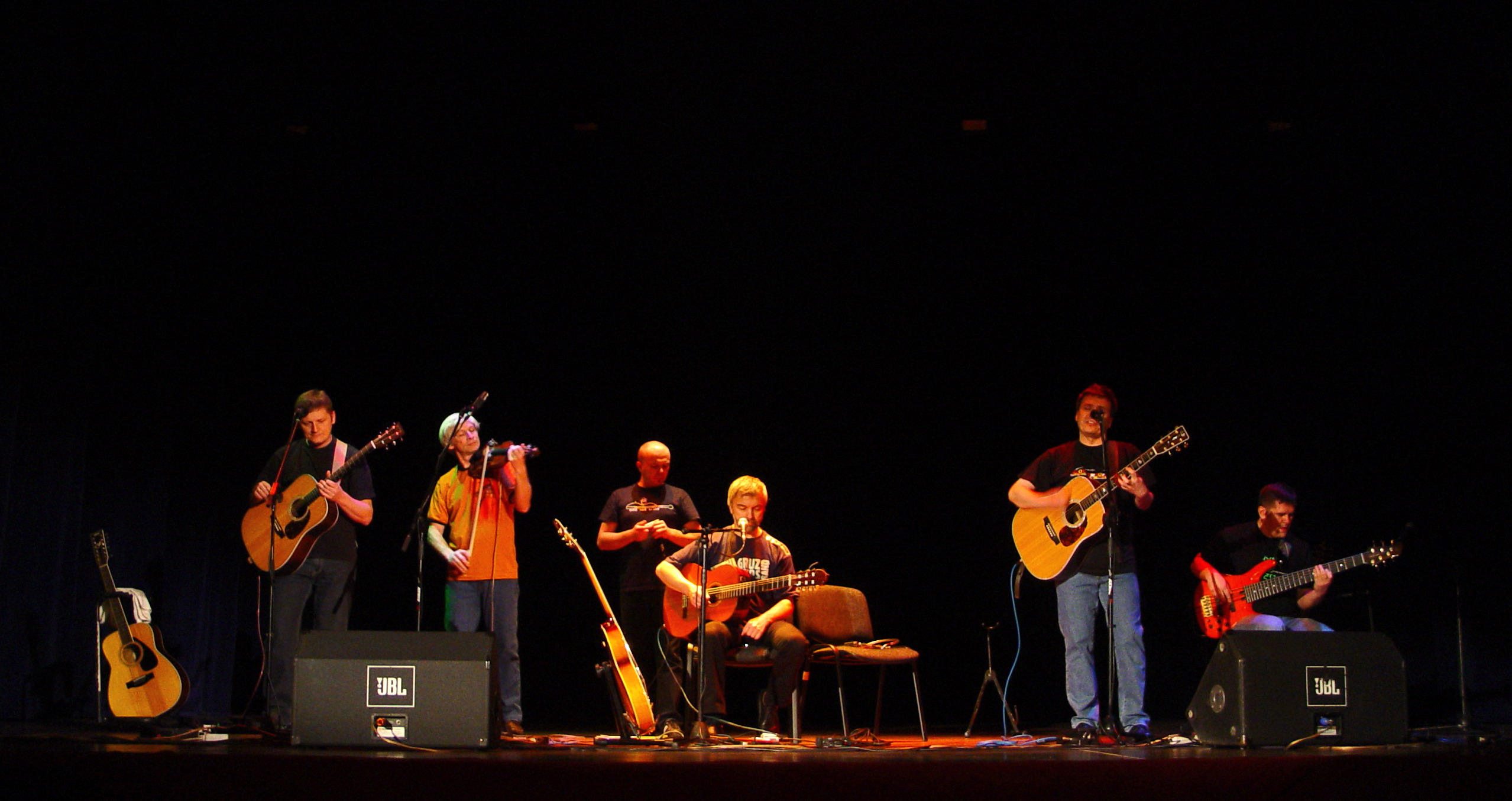
- SDM performing at the Cultural Centre of Busko-Zdrój in 2008

Background information
- Origin: Poland
- Genres: Sung poetry, folk, acoustic blues
- Years active: 1984 - present
- Labels: Pronit, Pomaton, Pomaton EMI, Dalmafon, EMI Music Poland, Parlophone Music Poland
- Members: Krzysztof Myszkowski; Bolo Pietraszkiewicz; Roman Ziobro
- Past members: Andrzej Sidorowicz; Marek Czerniawski; Alina Karolewicz; Aleksandra Kiełb-Szawuła; Sławomir Plota; Grzegorz Sieradzan; Stefan Błaszczyński; Adam Ziemianin; Robert Szydło; Przemysław Chołody; Dariusz Czarny; Wojciech Czemplik; Andrzej Stagraczyński; Ryszard Żarowski; Maciej Harna
- Website: sdm-myszkowski.com/

Stare Dobre Małżeństwo (in English translation "good old marriage") is a Polish music group.

The band originates from the so-called "student music", popular in Poland. This musical style is characterised by the use of a guitar for accompaniment, while the lyrics often focus on hiking in the Polish mountains, love and adventure. However, SDM quickly developed their own unique style, and gained fame due to their innovative musical interpretations of poems written by the renowned Polish poet Edward Stachura. Additionally, they collaborated with poet Adam Ziemianin.

Currently, the band has moved away from "student music" towards what can be described as acoustic blues. Furthermore, they often use poems of the forgotten poet Jan Rybowicz whose work addressed important questions about human existence.

== Discography ==
Title	Album details	Peak chart positions	Sales	Certifications
Title	Album details	POL	Sales	Certifications
Dla wszystkich starczy miejsca	Released: 1990; Label: Pronit; Formats: LP, CD, CS	—		
Makatki	Released: 1990; Label: Pomaton EMI; Formats: LP, CD, CS	—		
Sercopisanie	Released: 1990; Label: Pomaton EMI; Formats: CD, CS	—		
Czarny blues o czwartej nad ranem	Released: 1992; Label: Pomaton EMI; Formats: CD, CS	—	POL: 100,000+	POL: Gold
Pod wielkim dachem nieba	Released: 1992; Label: Pomaton EMI; Formats: CD, CS	—		
Niebieska tancbuda	Released: 1993; Label: Dalmafon, Pomaton EMI; Formats: CD, CS	—	POL: 100,000+	POL: Gold
Dolina w długich cieniach	Released: 13 February 1995; Label: Pomaton EMI; Formats: CD, CS	—	POL: 100,000+	POL: Gold
Latawce pogodnych dni	Released: 30 September 1996; Label: Pomaton EMI; Formats: CD, CS	—	POL: 100,000+	POL: Gold
Miejska strona księżyca	Released: 14 April 1998; Label: Pomaton EMI; Formats: CD, CS	—		
Bieszczadzkie anioły	Released: 10 July 2000; Label: Pomaton EMI; Formats: CD	—		
Kino objazdowe	Released: 28 September 2002; Label: Pomaton EMI; Formats: CD	24		
Beretka dla Bejdaka	Released: 16 August 2004; Label: Pomaton EMI; Formats: CD	27		
Missa Pagana	Released: 5 December 2005; Label: EMI Music Poland; Formats: CD	28		
Tabletki ze słów	Released: 20 November 2006; Label: EMI Music Poland; Formats: CD, digital download	19		
Jednoczas	Released: 31 March 2008; Label: EMI Music Poland; Formats: CD+DVD	13	POL: 15,000+	POL: Gold
Odwet pozorów	Released: 21 September 2009; Label: EMI Music Poland; Formats: CD	16		
Maszeruj z chamem	Released: 5 September 2011; Label: SDM/EMI Music Poland; Formats: CD+DVD	8		
Mówi mądrość	Released: 3 September 2013; Label: Pomaton/Parlophone Music Poland; Formats: CD+DVD	24		
"—" denotes a recording that did not chart or was not released in that territory.
