= Ace Lacewing =

Character in children's books by David Biedrzycki

Ace Lacewing: Bug Detective is a series of children's books written and illustrated by David Biedrzycki. Each book follows Ace Lacewing, an anthropomorphic insect detective, on his latest crime solving caper. In his adventures, Ace is frequently accompanied by his girlfriend Xerces Blue, a butterfly, and Sergeant Zito the Mosquito.

The series has been influenced heavily by film noir and the American private eye school of detective fiction, the visual style evoking the noir atmosphere with moody blue and black backgrounds. Each installment takes place in the fictitious Motham City, echoing Gotham City, the dark metropolis of DC Comics. Plot lines are typically mystery based, with the culprit being unknown until the very end of the story. Although unrealistic in nature, each book incorporates a unique insect fact that aids Ace in solving the mystery. The author has said that he had the idea for the character while illustrating a non-fiction book on bugs and incidentally learning a lot about them.

The School Library Journal review of Ace Lacewing: Bug Detective notes the many humorous touches, both verbal and visual, including insect-related puns.

The books have won several awards, including the Bank Street College of Education's Best Books of the Year Award and the IRA Children's Book Award Notables.

The books have been translated into Chinese, with even the extensive signage in the artwork being translated.

== The books ==
- Ace Lacewing: Bug Detective (2004)
- Ace Lacewing, Bug Detective: Bad Bugs Are My Business (2007)
- Ace Lacewing, Bug Detective: The Big Swat (2009)
