= Przegląd =

Weekly Polish magazine

- Editor-in-chief: Jerzy Domański
- Frequency: Weekly
- Format: Magazine
- Paid circulation: 12,436
- Country: Poland
- Based in: Warsaw
- Language: Polish
- Website: tygodnikprzeglad.pl
- ISSN: 1509-3115
- OCLC: 61166020

Przegląd (Polish pronunciation: [ˈpʂɛ.ɡlɔnt], transl. Review) is a weekly Polish news and opinion magazine published in Warsaw, Poland.

== History and profile ==
Przegląd was started in 1990 as the successor of another weekly, Przegląd Tygodniowy, which had been published since 1982. The Editor-in-chief is Jerzy Domański.

Editorial board: Krystyna Kofta, Krzysztof Teodor Toeplitz, Piotr Gadzinowski, Bronisław Łagowski.

Aleksander Małachowski and Stanisław Lem published in Przegląd.

== Editorial stance ==
Przegląd is a left-wing publication, and is considered to be connected with two Polish left-wing political parties, the Democratic Left Alliance and Labour Union. It has been critical of the policies of all post-communist governments, and is opposed to the monetarist policies that were instituted by Polish economist and finance minister Leszek Balcerowicz. The magazine was a vocal opponent of Poland's military presence in Iraq, and remains a persistent critic of the role that the Catholic Church plays in the social and political life of Poland.

== See also ==
- List of magazines in Poland
