= Joanna Oparek =

Polish poet and novelist (born 1967)

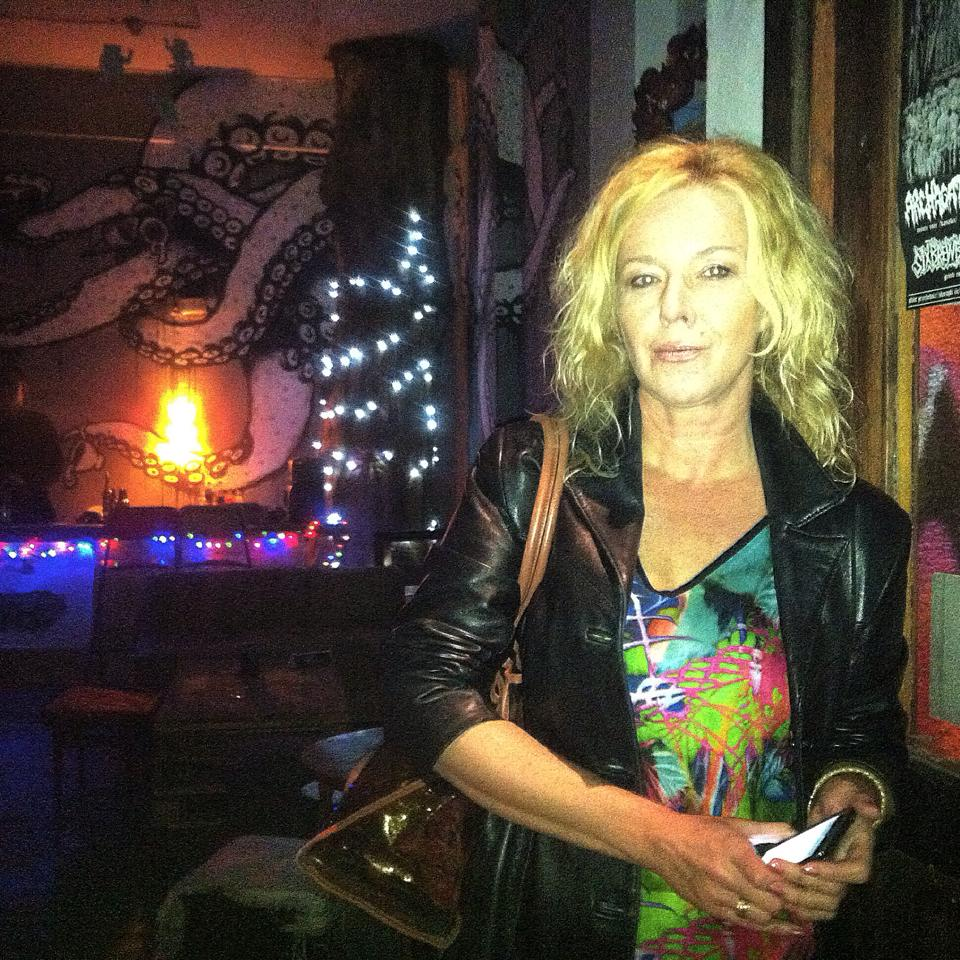
- Oparek in 2014
- Born: 1967 (age 58–59)
- Education: Jagiellonian University
- Known for: Poet; novelist; playwright

Joanna Oparek (born 1967) is a Polish poet, writer, songwriter, and playwright.

== Early life and education ==
Oparek graduated in psychology from the Jagiellonian University in Kraków. She then worked as a journalist, creative director in an advertising agency, a Public Relations specialist and a screenwriter.

== Writing career ==
In the 1980s, Oparek made her writing debut in the magazine Przekrój with the serialization of her novel Pan Gałązka, czyli jak jak zmiany chwilić na kaszówek (Mr. Gałązka, or how to make changes on the cash register). As a journalist, she also contributed to Czas Krakowski. For over ten years, she was the creative director of the advertising agency Publika. She has authored three other novels, Człowiek z kodem barowym (Bar Code man), Jesień w Nowego Miasta (Autumn in New York) and Loża (The Lodge), a novel about the career in America of Helena Modjeska. In 1998, she started to collaborate as a songwriter with the rock band Kulturka.

She has published several volumes of poetry, namely Po koci w nieba (From the cat to the sky), Czerwie (Maggots), Berlin Porn, Mocne Skóra, Białe płótna (Firm Skin, White canvas), and Małe istotneści (Small duties). Her poems have been published in many literary magazines and have been translated into Spanish, Serbian, Ukrainian and English. Twice nominated for the Gdynia Literary Prize in the poetry category, she was awarded the Kraków Book of the Month award for Małe istotneści in June 2023. In 2018, she chaired the jury of the Rafał Wojaczek National Poetry Competition.

== Theatrical activities ==
In 2011, Oparek took part in the international project Kraków-Berlin XPRS, carried out by the Helena Modrzejewska National Old Theatre in Kraków and the Maxim Gorki Theater in Berlin. Her play, Wężowisko (The Serpent) was premiered at the Łaźnia Nowa Theatre in Kraków. In 2018, her play Obcy. Tragedia grecka (The Stranger. Greek Tragedy) was performed in Poland and Germany and at the Golden Lion International Theatre Festival in Lviv, Ukraine in 2019, as part of a project to build relations between the three countries. In 2021, at the Municipal Theatre in Gliwice, she directed her play Całe życie (All my life). For her directing, she received a nomination for the Golden Mask in 2022. The play had been premiered in Kraków in 2019 as part of the celebration of the 100th anniversary of obtaining voting rights by Polish women. During the COVID-19 pandemic she organized online theatrical and literary events.
