= Ziemowit Szczerek =

Polish writer, journalist, and translator (born 1978)

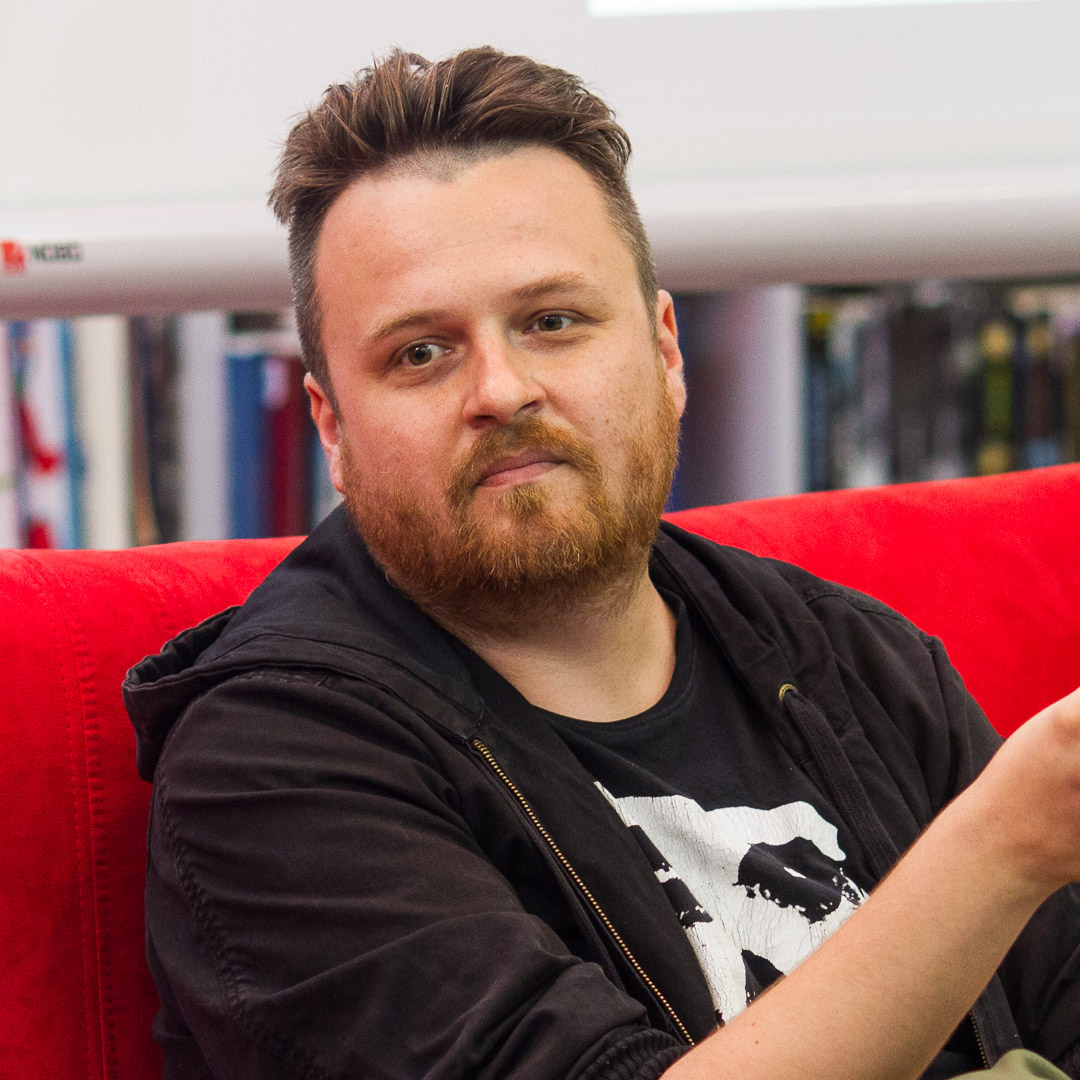
- Ziemowit Szczerek, 2015
- Born: 10 April 1978 (age 48); Radom
- Occupations: Writer, journalist, translator

Ziemowit Szczerek (born 10 April 1978) is a journalist, writer and translator.

== Biography ==
The son of Marian Szczerek. He graduated with master's degree in law from the Jagiellonian University.

== Books ==
- Paczka radomskich. 2010. With Marcin Kępa.
- Przyjdzie Mordor i nas zje, czyli tajna historia Słowian. 2013.
- Rzeczpospolita zwycięska. 2013.
- Siódemka. 2014.
- Mur. 12 kawałków o Berlinie. 2015. Text Iś bin ajn Berliner with Kaja Puto.
- Tatuaż z tryzubem. 2015.
- Międzymorze. Podróże przez prawdziwą i wyobrażoną Europę Środkową. 2017.
- Siwy dym albo pięć cywilizowanych plemion. 2018.
- Via Carpatia. Podróże po Węgrzech i Basenie Karpackim. 2019.
- Cham z kulą w głowie. 2020.
- Kolejna alternatywna historia Polski. 2021.
- Wymyślone miasto Lwów. 2022.
- Końce światów. 2025.

== Accolades ==
- Paszport Polityki (2013)
- Kraków Book of the Month Award for Przyjdzie Mordor i nas zje czyli Tajna historia Słowian (May 2014)
