= Zośka Papużanka =

Polish writer and teacher

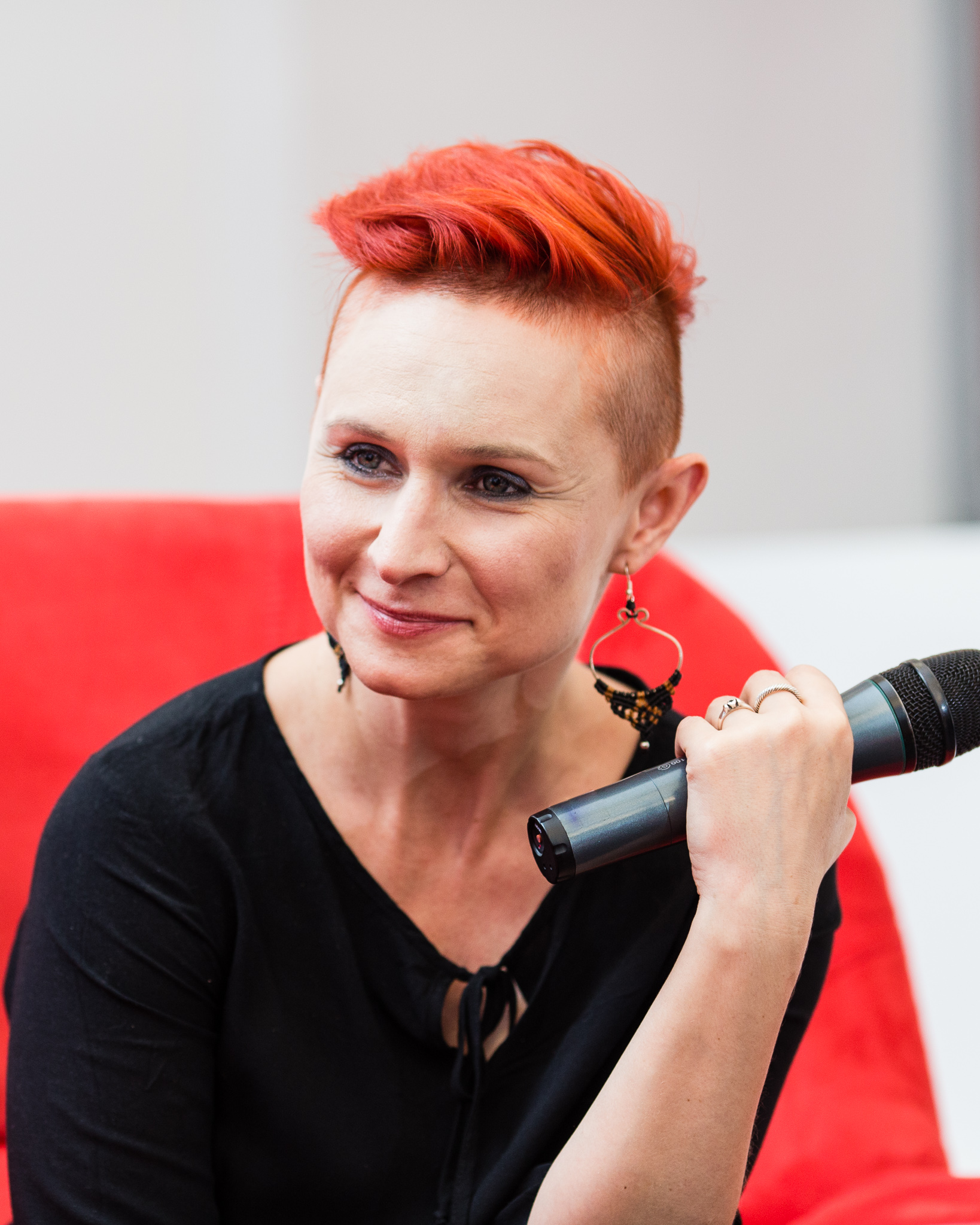
- Born: 1978 (age 47–48); Poland
- Education: Jagiellonian University; Pedagogical University of Kraków
- Occupations: Writer, teacher
- Works: Szopka (2012); On (2016); Świat dla Ciebie zrobi (2017); Przez (2020); Żaden koniec (2023)
- Awards: Stanisław Wyspiański Theatre Award, Kraków Book of the Month Award

Zośka Papużanka (born in 1978) is a Polish writer, songwriter, and primary school teacher.

== Early life ==
Papużanka graduated in theatre studies from the Jagiellonian University in Kraków in Poland. She obtained a PhD from the Pedagogical University of Kraków with a thesis on the reception of the plays of Federico García Lorca performed in Poland. She lives in Kraków and is a Polish language teacher.

== Writing career ==
Papużanka made her debut as a writer in 2012 with Szopka (Tomfoolery), for which she was nominated for the Nike Literary Award and Polityka Passports. The novel, which was very well received, concerns an average but dysfunctional family, which she describes in a satirical way. In 2014, 50 of the benches in Planty Park in Kraków had a name plate added to them of an author who either came from or was connected with Kraków. A further 50 were added a year later. Next to the name was a QR code, which enabled people to access brief information about the author and read an excerpt from their work. This was one of the activities associated with the Kraków UNESCO City of Literature celebrations of that year. Papużanka was one of those recognised in this way, evidence of the status she had already received with her first book.

Papużanka's second novel was On, published in 2016, which earned her another nomination for the Polityka's Passports award and one for the Gryfia Literary Award, as well as being made the Kraków Book of the Month. In this, she returns to the times of the Polish People's Republic and describes an environment she knows well, that of a primary school. She considers the school system of the time as being one of "stupidity". Her third book Świat dla Ciebie zrobi (The world will do for you), a collection of short stories, was published in 2017. In 2018, she took part in a project related to the Kazimierz district of Kraków: O_KAZ. Literature about Kazimierz, writing a short story that was read on Radio Kraków by Anna Dymna.

In 2019, Papużanka received scholarships from the Genshagen Institute and the city of Kraków. Her next novel, Przez, was published in 2020. This is a psychological novel for which Papużanka studied photography. The book concerns a husband who cannot come to terms with the breakup of his marriage and starts spying on his ex-partner and taking pictures of her. Kąkol (Cockle) was published in 2021. This concerns a childhood vacation in the countryside. While bringing out the idyllic countryside, the book concentrates on interpersonal relationships, which are not fully understood by the teenage narrator. During the COVID-19 pandemic, Papużanka wrote sixteen episodes of an online mini-series In connection with the existing situation, starring Agnieszka Przepiórska. The series received the Stanisław Wyspiański Theatre Award. In 2023 she published Żaden koniec (Old Hat), a novel about a family over several generations.

In addition to books, Papużanka writes reviews for magazines, such as Tygodnik Powszechny a Roman Catholic magazine published in Kraków, Radar, an international literary magazine published between 2010 and 2014 and again in 2023. and the monthly Nowe Książki. Translations of her reviews are published in New Eastern Europe, a news magazine based in Kracków. She is a frequent guest on TV and radio programmes. She also writes songs for the Parawan Puppet and Actor Theatre and other Krakow cabarets.
