= Piotr Marecki =

Polish writer and scholar (born 1976)

- Born: 1976 (age 49–50)
- Occupations: Writer, academic teacher

Academic background
- Education: Jagiellonian University
- Doctoral advisor: Tadeusz Szczepański

Piotr Marecki (born 1976) is a cultural studies scholar, writer, professor at the Jagiellonian University, co-founder and director of Ha!art publishing house, former editor-in-chief of the Ha!art magazine.

== Biography ==
He graduated in Polish philology (2000) and film studies (2001) from the Jagiellonian University. He obtained doctorate in 2007 and habilitation in 2019. His interests include digital culture, electronic literature, demoscene, contemporary and experimental literature.

== Awards ==
In 2007 he received Kraków Book of the Month Award for the book Tekstylia bis. Słownik młodej polskiej kultury.

== Books ==
=== Academic monographs ===
- Pospolite ruszenie. Czasopisma kulturalno-literackie w Polsce po 1989 roku. Kraków. 2005.
- Kino niezależne w Polsce 1989-2009. Historia mówiona. Warszawa. 2009.
- Żuławski. Warszawa. 2008. Co-authored with Piotr Kletowski.
- Barański. Warszawa. 2009.
- Królikiewicz. Pracuję dla przyszłości. Kraków. 2010. Co-authored with Piotr Kletowski.
- Nam wieczna w polszczyźnie rozróba. Marian Pankowski mówi. Kraków. 2011.
- Szulkin. Życiopis. Kraków. 2012. Co-authored with Piotr Kletowski.
- Czycz i kino, czyli przyliteracki status polskiego kina. Kraków. 2012.
- Literatura polska po 1989 roku w świetle teorii Pierre'a Bourdieu: raport z badań. Kraków. 2014. Co-authored with Grzegorz Jankowicz, Alicja Palęcka, Jan Sowa, Tomasz Warczok.
- Gatunki cyfrowe. Instrukcja obsługi. Kraków. 2018.
- Między kartką a ekranem. Cyfrowe eksperymenty z medium książki w Polsce. Kraków. 2018.
- Praktyka i eksperyment. Laboratoryjny model humanistyki. Kraków: Wydawnictwo Uniwersytetu Jagiellońskiego. 2019.
- Gatunki cyfrowe 2. 2024.

=== Literary works ===
- Stoberskiada. Kraków: Ha!art. 2013.
- Wiersze za sto dolarów. Kraków: Ha!art. 2017.
- Sezon grzewczy. Kraków: Ha!art. 2018.
- Robbo. Solucja. Kraków: Ha!art. 2018.
- Niepodległa Google. Kraków: Ha!art. 2019.
- Polska przydrożna. 2020.
- Romantika. 2021.
