= Roma Ligocka =

Polish writer and painter

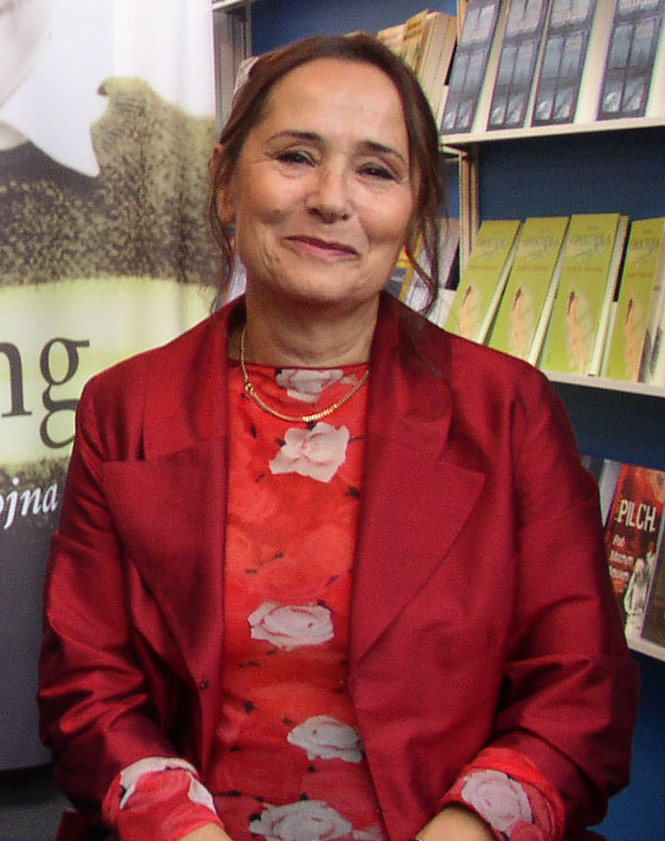
- Roma Ligocka at The Cracow Book Fair in 2004
- Born: Rominka Liebling; 13 November 1938 (age 88); Kraków, Poland
- Occupations: Costume designer, writer, painter
- Spouse: Jan Biczycki

Roma Ligocka (born Roma Liebling, 13 November 1938) is a Polish writer, and painter.

== Biography ==
She was born in a Jewish family in Kraków a year before World War II. During the German occupation of Poland, her family was persecuted by the Germans – her father was incarcerated, first in the Płaszów and then Auschwitz concentration camps. In 1940, she was taken with her mother to the Kraków Ghetto but, before the end of the ghetto in 1943, they fled and hid with a Polish family. After World War II, she studied painting and scenic design in the Academy of Fine Arts in Kraków. Then, she worked with considerable success in theatre, film, and television as a set designer. In 1965, she and her husband, Jan Biczycki, left Communist Poland and moved to Munich, Germany, where she continued with her set design assignments. Roma Ligocka is Roman Polanski's cousin.

== Novels ==
She has written several novels, some of them reflecting her biography:

- The Girl in the Red Coat (Dziewczynka w czerwonym płaszczyku)
- Znajoma z lustra
- Kobieta w podróży
- Tylko ja sama (originally published in German)
- Wszystko z miłości

Ligocka's novel, The Girl in the Red Coat, was inspired by Steven Spielberg's film Schindler's List. After watching the film, she recognized herself as the possible inspiration for the girl in red.

== Awards ==
- Kraków Book of the Month Award for Dziewczynka w czerwonym płaszczyku (September 2001)
