= Adam Wodnicki =

Polish professor (1930–2020)

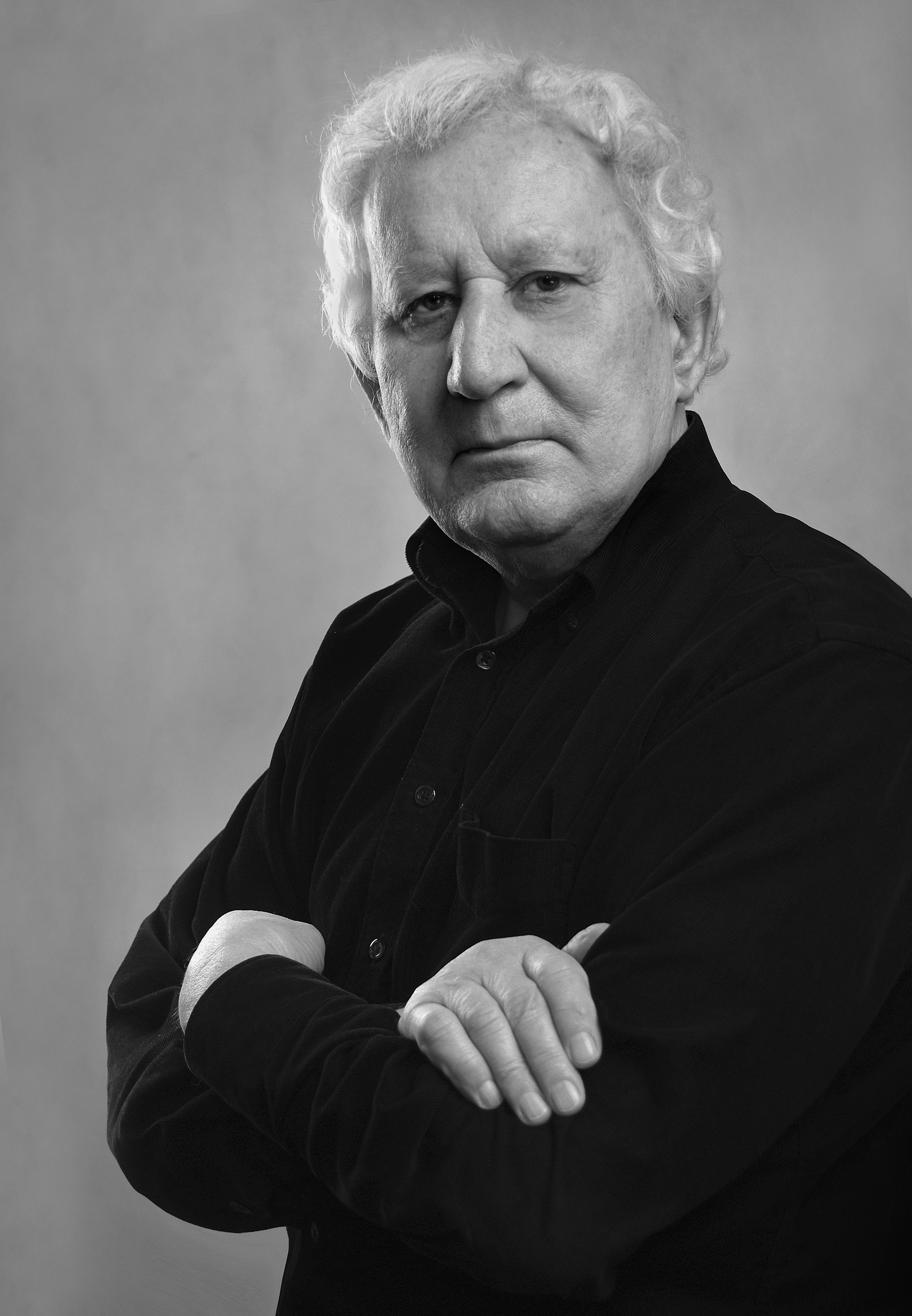
- Adam Wodnicki in 2011.
- Born: 25 December 1930; Janów Lubelski, Second Polish Republic
- Died: 9 June 2020 (aged 89)
- Occupations: Professor; Writer

Adam Wodnicki (25 December 1930 – 9 June 2020) was a Polish professor, writer, and translator. He translated many works from French into Polish.

== Biography ==
As a young teenager, Wodnicki participated in the Polish Resistance during World War II. He was in the Gray Ranks of Polish Scouting in the Lublin region.

After the war, Wodnicki studied at the Jan Matejko Academy of Fine Arts in Kraków, where he helped co-found and write for the bimonthly magazine Zebra. In 1967, he began teaching at the academy, where he became dean of the faculty of industrial design, and then became vice-rector. He was one of the founding members of Cap à l'Est, a European poetry and music festival that takes place every year in Slovakia.

Wodnicki served as a member of the editorial board of Austeria, a publishing house in Kraków. He was a visiting professor at the École supérieure des beaux-arts de Toulouse and the Collège international des traducteurs littéraires d'Arles.

Wodnicki lived in Kraków with his wife, Maria Ledkiewicz-Wodnicka, a sculptor who specialized in ceramic monuments. He died on 9 June 2020 at the age of 89.

== Translations ==
- Poematy epickie 1924-1973. (Wygnanie, Deszcze, Śniegi, Poemat dla Cudzoziemki, Wichry, Amers, Kronika, Śpiewane dla tej, która tu była, Pieśń na zrównanie dnia z nocą) (1992)
- Poezje zebrane 1945-1995 (1996)
- Dzikie źródło (2003)
- Z pustyni do Księgi (2005)
- Wenecja ocalona (2005)
- Anabaza, Wygnanie, Susza (2006)
- Artysta, służąca i uczony (2006)
- Bliskie wody (2008)
- Brzegi Syrtów (2008)
- Mała księga dywersji poza podejrzeniem (2010)

== Works ==
- Notatki z Prowansji (2011)
- Obrazki z krainy d’Oc (2012)
- Arelate. Obrazki z niemiejsca (2013)
- Tryptyk oksytański (2014)
- Anamnezy (2015)

== Awards ==
- Literatura na Świecie magazine prize for translations of Saint-John Perse (1995)
- Literatura na Świecie magazine prize for translations of Yves Bonnefoy (1997)
- ZAiKS prize for his translations of French poetry (1998)
- Kraków Book of the Month Prize for Arelate. Obrazki z niemiejsca (Arelate, photos de nulle part) (2013)
