= Agnieszka Biedrzycka =

Polish historian

Agnieszka Biedrzycka is a Polish historian and writer from the Institute of History of the Polish Academy of Sciences (PAN). She obtained her doctorate in December 2002 from the Faculty of History of the Jagiellonian University in Kraków, Poland. Biedrzycka serves as research scientist and editor for the multi-volume Polish Biographical Dictionary (Polski Słownik Biograficzny) published by PAN incrementally. She is in charge of the History of Poland in the Early Modern era department. Since the 1989 return to democracy from under the Soviet-led totalitarian control, many distortions printed there have already been corrected. Her professional interest in research work gave impetus to the book about the history of Lwów in the Second Polish Republic before the invasion of Poland (front cover pictured), which was followed by the systematic destruction of the city's Polish heritage by the Soviet Union.

Biedrzycka's interest in the Polish history of Lwów (now Lviv in sovereign Ukraine) going back in time is longstanding, and includes several books published in over a dozen of years. She wrote the Bibliografia pomników kultury dawnych kresów południowo-wschodnich Rzeczypospolitej (Kraków 2000), Korespondencja Stanisława Koniecpolskiego hetmana wielkiego koronnego (Kraków 2005), Pomniki epigrafiki i heraldyki dawnej Rzeczypospolitej na Ukrainie, vol. 1 (Kraków 2005), and most recently, Kalendarium Lwowa 1918–1939 (Kraków 2012).

She received Kraków Book of the Month Award in September 2012 for the book Kalendarium Lwowa 1918–1939.

== Selected publications ==
- Agnieszka Biedrzycka, "Inwentarz kościołów dekanatu czarnokozinieckiego w zbiorach Biblioteki Naukowej PAU i PAN w Krakowie," Rocznik Biblioteki PAU i PAN w Krakowie, R. LIII, 2008. OCLC 256876475
- Agnieszka Biedrzycka, "Inwentarz kościołów dekanatu satanowskiego w zbiorach Biblioteki Naukowej PAU i PAN," Rocznik Biblioteki PAU i PAN w Krakowie, R. LIV, 2009.
- Agnieszka Biedrzycka, "Diariusz legacji Jerzego Bałabana do Siedmiogrodu w roku 1643," w: Inter maiestatem ac libertatem. Studia z dziejów nowożytnych dedykowane profesorowi Kazimierzowi Przybosiowi, red. Jarosław Stolicki, Marek Ferenc, Janusz Dąbrowski, Kraków.
- Agnieszka Biedrzycka, "Inwentarz kościołów dekanatu międzyboskiego w zbiorach Biblioteki Naukowej PAU i PAN w Krakowie," Rocznik Biblioteki PAU i PAN w Krakowie, R. LV, 2010.

=== Books ===
- Agnieszka Biedrzycka, Bibliografia pomników kultury dawnych kresów południowo-wschodnich Rzeczypospolitej, Towarzystwo Naukowe Societas Vistulana, Kraków 2000, ISBN 8390909456.
- Agnieszka Biedrzycka, Ziema lwowska dawnego województwa ruskiego Wydawn. Tow. Nauk. Societas Vistulana, Kraków 2005, ISBN 8388385674.
- Agnieszka Biedrzycka, Kalendarium Lwowa 1918–1939, Universitas, Kraków 2012, ISBN 97883-242-2235-3.
