= Beata Szymańska =

Polish poet and writer (1938–2025)

- Born: 29 January 1938; Puławy, Poland
- Died: 4 July 2025 (aged 87)

Philosophical work
- Main interests: Modern philosophy, Eastern philosophy

Beata Szymańska (29 January 1938 – 4 July 2025) was a Polish poet, writer and philosopher.

== Life and career ==
Szymańska left the philosophy department of the Jagiellonian University and received her doctorate in philosophy in 1977. For several years she worked as research associate at the Jagiellonian University. In 1987, she published her book ‘’Berkeley znany i nieznany’’ that was focused on generally unknown aspects of Berkeley’s life and works.

Szymańska started publishing her fiction in 1961. She died on 4 July 2025, at the age of 87.

== Writings ==
- Sny o porządku
- Sztychy reńskie
- Trzciny
- Immanuel Kant
- Poeta i nieznane
- Co to jest struktualizm
- Wiersze
- Berkeley znany i nieznany. — Wrocław etc.: Ossolineum, 1987. — 51 s. - (Nauka dla wszystkich /Pol. akad. nauk. Oddz. w Krakowie; N 407) Bibliogr.: s.51.
- Przeżycia i uczucia jako wartości filozofii polskiego modernizmu
- Filozofia Wschodu, praca zbiorowa pod red. Beaty Szymańskiej, 2001.
- Słodkich snów Europo, 2005.
- Chiński buddyzm chan, 2009.

== Awards ==
- Kraków Book of the Month Award for the book Anioły mojej ulicy (April 2001)

== Sources ==
- Bartelski, Lesław M. (1995). Polscy pisarze współcześni, 1939-1991: Leksykon [Modern Polish Writers] (in Polish). Wydawn. Nauk. PWN. ISBN 83-01-11593-9.
- Kuniński, Miłowit. "Philosophy at the Jagiellonian University". Faculty of Philosophy and History at the Jagiellonian University.
- Szymańska, Marta (2008). "Review Article: George Berkeley's Philosophy in Polish Studies" (PDF). Berkeley Studies. 19 (19): 32–40. doi:10.5840/berkeleystudies2008193.
