= David Biedrzycki =

American writer

David Robert Biedrzycki (born 1955) is an American illustrator and writer of children's books. His Ace Lacewing: Bug Detective was named one of the Bank Street College of Education's Best Books of the Year.

== Biography ==
Biedrzycki was born in 1955 in Taylor, Pennsylvania. He attended Kutztown University and began work as an illustrator in 1980 after graduating. Before beginning children's book illustration, Biedrzycki worked in advertising and designed many food product labels.

He lives in Massachusetts with his wife, Kathy. Their children are Justin, Alec, and Julia.

== Books ==
- Ace Lacewing: Bug Detective (2004)
- Ace Lacewing, Bug Detective: Bad Bugs Are My Business (2007)
- Ace Lacewing, Bug Detective: The Big Swat (2009)
- Santa's New Jet (2007)
- Santa Retires (2012)
- Me and My Dragon (2011)
- Me and My Dragon: Scared of Halloween (2013)
- Me and My Dragon: Christmas Spirit (2015)
- Breaking News: Bear Alert (2014)
- Sumokitty (2019)

With Jerry Pallotta

- The Beetle Alphabet Book
- The Boat Alphabet Book
- The Freshwater Alphabet Book
- Underwater Counting
- Icky Bug Numbers 12345
- Who Will Help Santa This Year?
- Who Will Guide My Sleigh Tonight?
- Who will Haunt My House on Halloween?
- Dory Story
