= Adam Ziemianin =

Polist poet (born 1948)

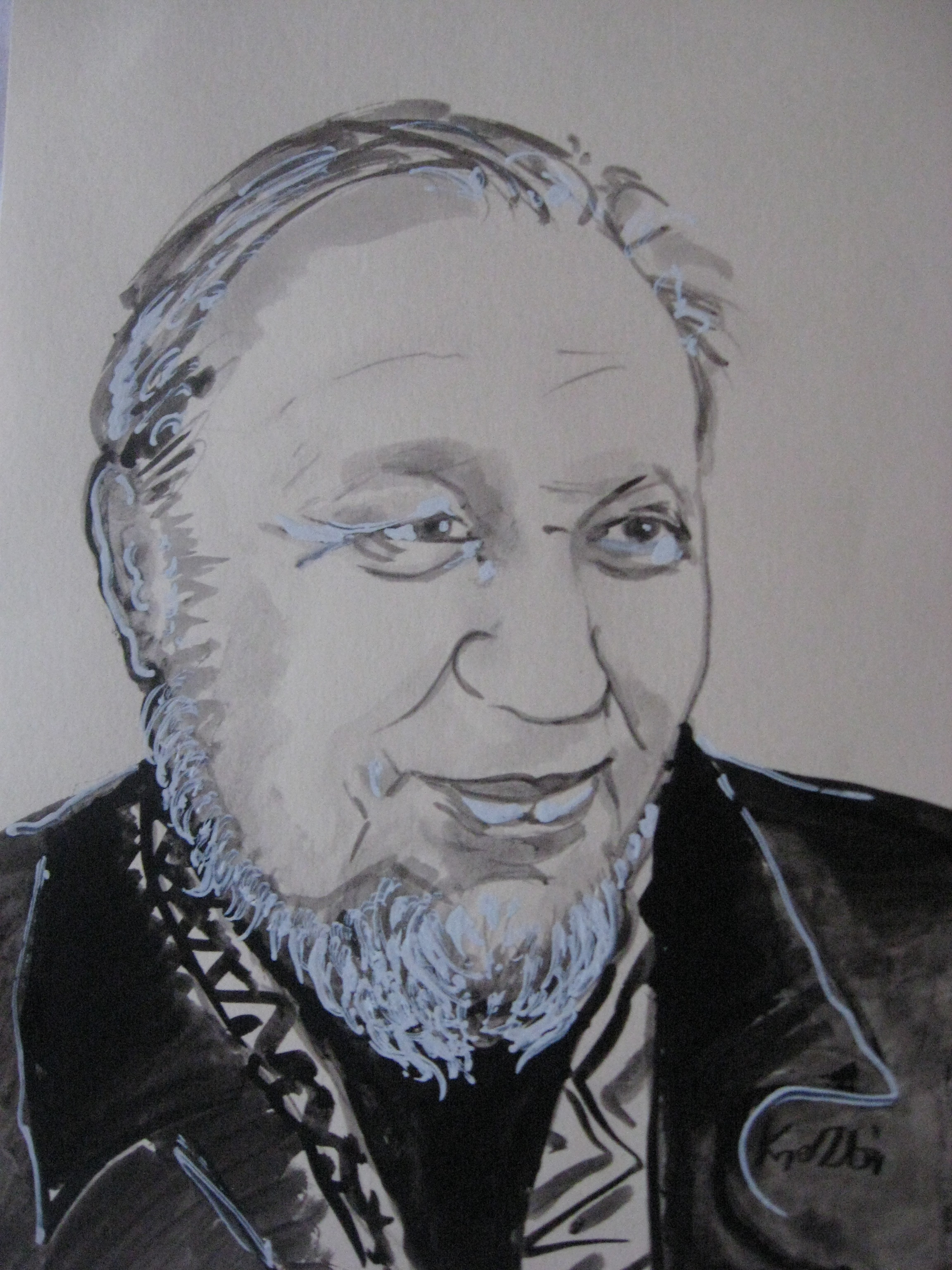
- Born: 12 May 1948 (age 78); Muszyna
- Citizenship: Polish
- Occupation: Poet

Adam Ziemianin (born 12 May 1948) is a Polish poet.

== Biography ==
The son of Jan Ziemianin, railwayman, and Maria née Buczyńska. He attended the high school in Krynica; he passed matura in 1966. From 1970 to 1974 he studied Polish philology at the Jagiellonian University. From 1970 he was a part of Tylicz poetry group.

He wrote lyrics for the band Wolna Grupa Bukowina (starting in 1972) and performed with the band of jazz guitarist Ryszard Styła. In 1976, he married Maria Zegadłowicz. From 1978 to 1983 he was a member of the Polish Writers' Union.

== Poetry volumes ==
- Wypogadza się nad naszym domem. 1975.
- Pod jednym dachem. 1977.
- Nasz słony rachunek. 1980.
- W kącie przedziału. 1982.
- Makatka z płonącego domu. 1985.
- Wiersze dla Marii. 1985.
- Zdrowaś Matko – łaski pełna. 1987.
- Dwoje na balkonie. 1989.
- Boski wieczorny młyn. 1990.
- List do zielonej ścieżki. 1993.
- Dom okoliczności łagodzących. 1995.
- Ulica Ogrodowa. 1996.
- Nosi mnie. 1997.
- A Weaver From Radziszów. 1997.
- Plac Wolności. 1999.
- Gościniec. 1999.
- Na głowie staję. 2002.
- Modlitwy mojego wieku. 2004.
- Notesik amerykański. 2004.
- Makatki. 2005.
- Dzikie zapałki. 2007.
- Przymierzanie peruki. 2007.
- Co za szczęście!. 2008.
- Chory na studnię. 2008.
- Z nogi na nogę. 2013.
- Zakamarki. 2016.

== Accolades ==
In February 2006, he received Kraków Book of the Month Award for the book Makatki. Twice, in 2017 and 2024, he was nominated to Konstanty Ildefons Gałczyński “Orfeusz” Literary Prize. In April 2013, he received Kraków Book of the Month Award for the book Z nogi na nogę.

== Bibliography ==
- Piotr Borek, Marek Karwala, Roman Mazurkiewicz, ed. (2020). W obliczu cudów wszechświata… Studia o twórczości Adama Ziemianina. Kraków: Wydawnictwo Księgarnia Akademicka. Review: Faron, Bolesław (2021). "Poeta z "krainy łagodności"" (PDF). Annales Universitatis Paedagogicae Cracoviensis. 13(1): 140–146. ISSN 2083-7275. Archived from the original (PDF) on 18 July 2026.
