= Perespa =

- Village
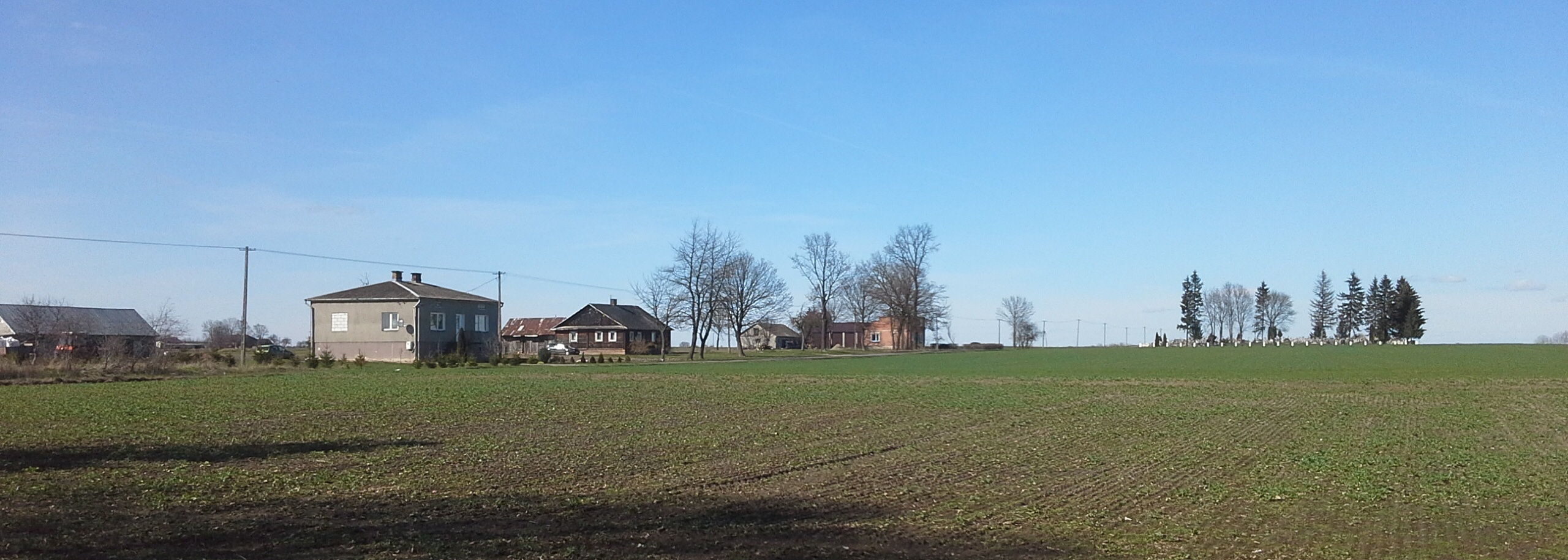

- Location within Poland
- Coordinates: 50°39′N 23°38′E
- Country: Poland
- Voivodeship: Lublin
- County: Tomaszów
- Gmina: Tyszowce
- Time zone: UTC+1 (CET)
  - Summer (DST): UTC+2 (CEST)
- Vehicle registration: LTM

Perespa [pɛˈrɛspa] is a village in the administrative district of Gmina Tyszowce, within Tomaszów County, Lublin Voivodeship, in eastern Poland.

== History ==
Following the German-Soviet invasion of Poland, which started World War II in September 1939, the village was occupied by Germany until 1944. In November 1939, the German gendarmerie and Ukrainian nationalists committed a massacre of 18 people, including 15 Jews and a Pole.
