= Ewa Lipska =

Polish poet (born 1945)

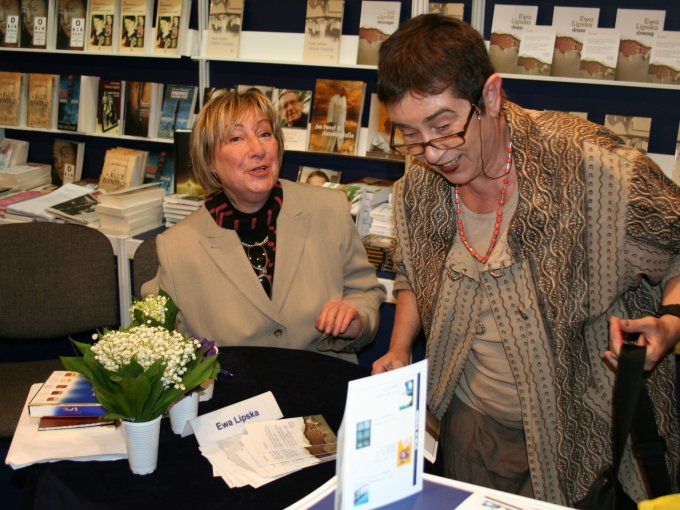
Ewa Lipska (left) at the International Book Fair in Warsaw, 2006

Ewa Lipska (born 8 October 1945 in Kraków) is a Polish poet from the Polish New Wave generation. Collections of her poetry have been translated into English, French, Italian, Czech, Danish, Dutch, German and Hungarian. She lives in Vienna and Kraków.

The Adam Mickiewicz Institute comments: "While her verse may have some connections with politics, it always documents concrete personal experiences without reaching for grand generalizations. As it unmasks the language of propaganda, her poetry also indicates the weaknesses of language in general as an instrument of human perception and communication."

== Books ==
=== Poetry collections ===
- 1967: Wiersze, ("Poems"); Warsaw: Czytelnik
- 1970: Drugi wybor wierszy, ("Second Collection of Poems"); Warsaw: Czytelnik
- 1972: Trzeci wybor wierszy, ("Third Collection of Poems"); Warsaw: Czytelnik
- 1974: Czwarty wybor wierszy, ("Fourth Collection of Verse"); Warsaw: Czytelnik
- 1978: Piaty wybor wierszy, ("Fifth Collection of Verse"); Warsaw: Czytelnik
- 1979: Dom spokojnej młodości ("A Home for Youth"), selected poems, Kraków: Wydawnictwo literackie
- 1979: Zywa smierc, ("Living Death"); Kraków: Wydawnictwo literackie
- 1981: Poezje wybrane ("Selected Poems"), Warszawa: LSW
- 1982: Nie o śmierć tutaj chodzi, lecz o biały kordonek ("Death Is Not at Stake, But the White Cord"), selected poems, Kraków: Wydawnictwo literackie
- 1985: Przechowalnia ciemnosci, ("Storage for Darkness"); Warsaw: Przedswit / Warszawska Oficyna Poetow i Malarzy
- 1986: Utwory wybrane ("Selected Work"), Kraków: Wydawnictwo literackie
- 1990: Strefa ograniczonego postoju, ("Limited Standing Zone"); Warsaw: Czytelnik
- 1993: Wakacje mizantropa. Utwory wybrane ("Misanthrope Holidays: Selected Work"), Kraków: Wydawnictwo literackie
- 1994: Stypendisci czasu, ("Time's Scholarship Winners"); Wroclaw: Wydawnictwo Dolnoslaskie
- 1996: Wspólnicy zielonego wiatraczka. Lekcja literatury z Krzysztofem Lisowskim ("Partners of the Green Fan: Literature Lesson with Krzysztof Lisowski"), selected poems, Kraków: Wydawnictwo literackie
- 1997: Ludzie dla poczatkujacych, ("People for Beginners"); Poznan: a5
- 1998: Godziny poza godzinami ("Hours Beyond Hours"), selected poems, Warsaw: PIW
- 1998: Życie zastępcze, Kraków: Wydawnictwo literackie
- 1999: 1999, Kraków: Wydawnictwo literackie
- 2001: Sklepy zoologiczne, ("Pet Shops"); Kraków: Wydawnictwo literackie
- 2002: Uwaga: stopień, Kraków: Wydawnictwo literackie
- 2003: Ja ("I"); Kraków: Wydawnictwo literackie
- 2004: Gdzie indziej, ("Somewhere else"); Kraków: Wydawnictwo literackie
- 2006: Drzazga, Kraków: Wydawnictwo literackie
- 2007: Pomarańcza Newtona, ("Newton's Orange"); Kraków: Wydawnictwo literackie

=== Prose ===
- 2009: Sefer (prose), Kraków: Wydawnictwo Literackie

=== Other ===
- 2018: Boli tylko, gdy się śmieję... Listy i rozmowy, Stanisław Lem, Ewa Lipska, Tomasz Lem, ebook, 2018, ISBN 978-83-08-06692-8, Wydawnictwo Literackie
  From book description: "... Contains records of conversations the poet and the writer had in the early 21st century, as well as the letters which Ewa Lipska exchanged with Stanisław Lem's son when he studied in the United States. The book is adorned with numerous photos."

== Selected translations of poetry by Ewa Lipska ==
- (English) Poet? Criminal? Madman? (Poems). London-Boston: Forest Books, 1991.
- (French) Poemes. Deux poétesses Polonaises contemporaines: Ewa Lipska et Wislawa Szymborska. Mundolsheim: L'Ancrier, 1996.
- (German) Auf den dächern der mausoleen. Gedichte. Berlin: Oberbaum, 1983.
- (German) Meine zeit. Mein lieb. Mein. leben. Geditchte. Salzburg, Wien: Residenz, 1990.
- (Danish) En misantrops ferie. Aarhus: Husets, 1990.
- (English) The New Century. Evanston: Northwestern University Press, 2009
- (Spanish) La astilla. La naranja de Newton Ediciones TREA, 2010. ISBN 978-84-9704-497-4
- (Dutch) Beste mevrouw Schubert, Gent, Poëziecentrum, 2015. ISBN 978-90-5655-186-5
- (Italian) Il lettore di impronte digitali, Rome: Donzelli, 2017.

== Awards ==
- Kraków Book of the Month Award for Sklepy zoologiczne (October 2001)
