= Anna Kowalska =

Polish writer and diarist

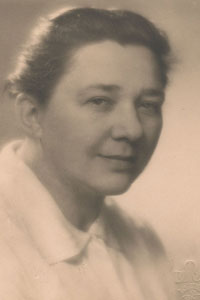
- Born: 26 April 1903; Lviv
- Died: 7 March 1969 (aged 65); Warsaw, Poland
- Writing career
- Notable works: Wielka próba; Dzienniki 1927–1969
- Notable awards: nagroda m. Wrocławia (1947), nagroda państwowa III stopnia (1951) Nagroda im. Hemingwaya (1959)

Anna Kowalska (née Chrzanowska; 26 April 1903 – 7 March 1969) was a Polish writer and diarist.

== Biography ==
=== Early years and education ===
Before the war, Chrzanowska lived and worked in Lviv, during the war - in Warsaw. As a native of Lviv, even after the war she felt a bond with the city of her childhood and youth, which she would reveal later in her work. She studied classical philology and graduated in romance studies at the University of Lviv. Knowledge of Greek and Latin, German, and especially fluent knowledge of French, which she mastered with confidence, along with a lively and absorbent intellectual sensitivity, allowed her to read in the original the works of the classics, and also to closely follow modern Western culture.

=== Marriage ===
In 1924, Anna Chrzanowska's married her professor, Jerzy Kowalski, classical philologist at the University of Lviv, who was 10 years older than her. In the interwar period, they traveled a lot around Europe: they visited, among others, Italy, Paris, Lausanne (where Kowalska attended lectures in Latin literature), Berlin and Munich (where she also listened to university lectures). In 1946, their daughter Maria, called Tula at home, was born in Wrocław. Kowalska joined the literary life of interwar Lviv, cooperated with the Sygnały weekly and the Przedmieście literary group. In 1936, she co-organized the Congress of Culture Workers.

After the outbreak of the World War II, the Kowalski family remained in Soviet Lviv: Jerzy continued lecturing at the university, Anna was a witness of political repressions (her brother was imprisoned, and her sister-in-law was deported to Siberia by Russians). In 1943, they moved to Warsaw where Kowalska joined the underground resistance. She was in the city during the Warsaw Uprising.

In 1945, Anna moved with her husband to Wrocław where Jerzy Kowalski organized classical philology at the University of Wrocław. They settled in Karłowice, in a villa at Samuel Bogumił Linde Street 10. After the death of her husband (he died of cancer in 1948) Kowalska remained in Wrocław.

=== After World War II ===
Anna participated in the literary and intellectual life of Wrocław, and from 1947 to 1952, she was a co-editor of the quarterly "Zeszyty Wrocławskie". A room in the house at Linde Street was rented by Czesław Hernas, then a student of Polish studies and a close friend of Kowalska and Maria Dąbrowska.

In 1954, Anna Kowalska moved to Warsaw and lived together with her daughter and Maria Dąbrowska (in a spacious apartment in a pre-war tenement house at Aleja Niepodległości). In 1963, they went together to Italy, Switzerland and Paris - visiting, among others Gustaw Herling-Grudziński, Jerzy Giedroyc and Jerzy Stempowski. She participated in the literary life of the capital, belonging to ZLP and Pen Club. She was one of the signatories of the so-called Letter of 34 to Prime Minister Józef Cyrankiewicz regarding freedom of culture. Despite having a progressing cancer, she followed the events of March 1968, bitterly journaling anti-democratic activities of the authorities.

=== Death ===
Anna died after long (journaled) struggles against cancer. She was buried at the Powązki Cemetery (Aleja Zasłużonych, grave 143).

== Personality ==
Kowalska was bisexual. In 1941, she met Maria Dąbrowska in Lviv, and when after two years she moved with her husband to Warsaw, they settled at home at Polna Street, in which Dąbrowska and Stanisław Stempowski had their apartment for years. Soon friendship and passionate love formed between women. Anna Kowalska remained a lifelong friend and companion of Dąbrowska's life. The bond lasted also during Kowalska's stay in Wrocław and regardless of her motherhood. Living together in Warsaw, however, Kowalska felt (which she reports in the diary) the tear between her daughter Tulcia and Dąbrowska, who disliked each other. During the last years of her life, Dąbrowska lived in her own home in Komorów near Warsaw. After Dąbrowska's death in 1965, Kowalska felt humiliated by her friend's will (in which she was omitted), before a later version was found, which included her and made her responsible for the legacy of writing.

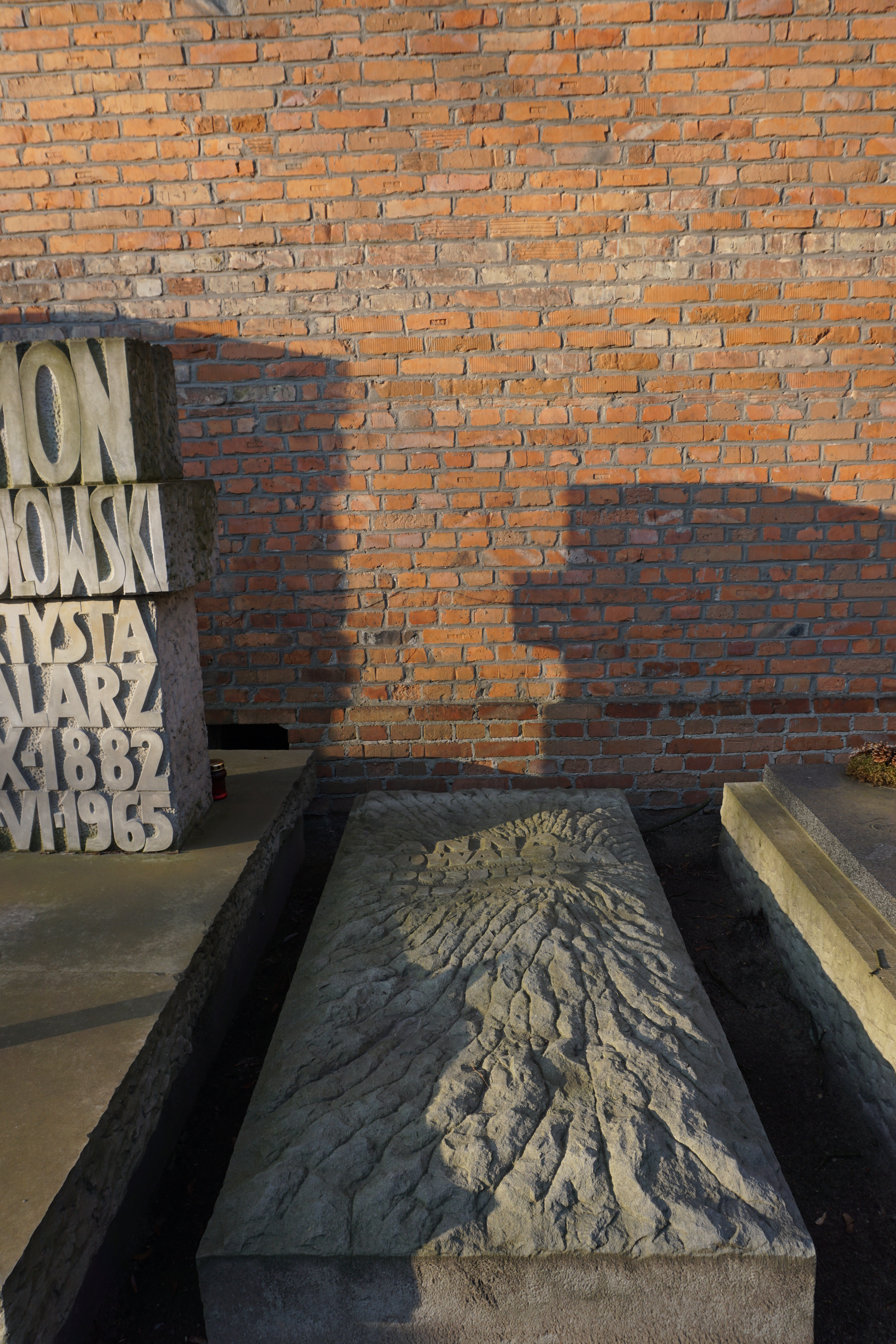
Anna Kowalska's grave at Powązki Cemetery

Anna Kowalska had left-wing (but not communist) views, while staying a Christian. She was considered a brilliant conversation partner, (Maria Dąbrowska mentioned her "impressive intellectuality") and a tolerant and open-minded person. She had many good friends among writers, who treated her as an authority (also with regards to resistance against the communist authorities). They were, among others. Jerzy Andrzejewski, Władysław Broniewski, Marian Czuchnowski, Paweł Hertz, Jarosław Iwaszkiewicz, Jan Parandowski, Antoni Słonimski, Julian Stryjkowski, Melchior Wańkowicz, Jerzy Zawieyski, Julia Hartwig. Despite that, according to her diaries, Anna always felt alone.

== Works ==
=== With Jerzy Kowalski ===
- Catalina – 1931
- Mijają nas – 1932
- Złota kula – 1933
- Gruce (subtitled Powieść o lwowskiej rodzinie) – 1936
- Gąszcz – 1961

=== As a sole author ===
- Opowiadania greckie – 1949
- Uliczka klasztorna – 1949
- Wielka próba –1951
- Na rogatce (autobiographical) – 1953
- Wójt wolborski – 1955
- Astrea – 1956
- Nimfa – 1958
- Safona – 1959
- Kandelabr efeski – 1960
- Ołtarze – 1962
- Figle pamięci – 1963
- Ptasznik – 1964
- Wieża – 1966
- Trzy boginie – 1966
- Szczelina – 1967
- Dzienniki 1927–1969

== Orders and decorations ==
- Commander's Cross, Order of Polonia Restituta
- Officer's Cross, Order of Polonia Restituta(1953)
- Silver Cross of Merit

== Bibliography ==
- Anna Kowalska: Dzienniki 1927–1969. Oprac. Paweł Kądziela. Wstęp: Julia Hartwig. Warszawa, Wydawnictwo Iskry, 2008, ISBN 978-83-244-0075-1.
