= Letter of 34 =

1964 Polish protest letter for freedom of expression

- Original title: List 34
- Presented: 14 March 1964
- Author: Antoni Słonimski
- Media type: Open Letter
- Subject: Protestation against censorship

The Letter of 34 (Polish: List 34) was a two-sentence protest letter by Polish intellectuals against censorship in Communist Poland, addressed to the Prime Minister Józef Cyrankiewicz, delivered on 14 March 1964 to the Council of Ministers by Antoni Słonimski. The name of the letter refers to the number of signatories.

== The letter ==
=== Original ===
Do Prezesa Rady Ministrów
Józefa Cyrankiewicza

Ograniczenia przydziału papieru na druk książek i czasopism oraz zaostrzenie cenzury prasowej stwarza sytuację zagrażającą rozwojowi kultury narodowej. Niżej podpisani, uznając istnienie opinii publicznej, prawa do krytyki, swobodnej dyskusji i rzetelnej informacji za konieczny element postępu, powodowani troską obywatelską, domagają się zmiany polskiej polityki kulturalnej w duchu praw zagwarantowanych przez konstytucję państwa polskiego i zgodnych z dobrem narodu.

=== Translation to English ===
To the prime minister
Józef Cyrankiewicz

Restrictions on the allocation of paper for printing books and magazines and the tightening of press censorship create a situation that threatens the development of national culture. The undersigned, recognizing the existence of public opinion, the right to criticism, free discussion and reliable information as a necessary element of progress, driven by civic concern, demand a change in Polish cultural policy in the spirit of rights guaranteed by the constitution of the Polish state and compatible with the good of the nation.

=== Signatories ===
1. Jerzy Andrzejewski
2. Maria Dąbrowska
3. Stanisław Dygat
4. Karol Estreicher
5. Marian Falski
6. Aleksander Gieysztor
7. Konrad Górski
8. Paweł Hertz
9. Leopold Infeld
10. Paweł Jasienica
11. Mieczysław Jastrun
12. Stefan Kisielewski
13. Zofia Kossak-Szczucka
14. Tadeusz Kotarbiński
15. Jan Kott
16. Anna Kowalska
17. Julian Krzyżanowski
18. Kazimierz Feliks Kumaniecki
19. Edward Lipiński
20. Maria Ossowska
21. Stanisław Cat Mackiewicz
22. Jan Parandowski
23. Stanisław Pigoń
24. Adolf Rudnicki
25. Artur Sandauer
26. Wacław Sierpiński
27. Antoni Słonimski
28. Jan Szczepański
29. Władysław Tatarkiewicz
30. Jerzy Turowicz
31. Melchior Wańkowicz
32. Adam Ważyk
33. Kazimierz Wyka
34. Jerzy Zagórski.

The author of the text was Antoni Słonimski, Jan Józef Lipski co-organized signing the letter.

== Reception ==
The letter caused a reaction in the West. The Times published a letter criticizing the authorities of the Polish People's Republic, signed by 21 British writers and artists, including Arthur Koestler and Alan Bullock. In addition, 15 Italian intellectuals including Alberto Moravia and 13 Harvard professors defended the signatories.

The letter caused the harassment and repression of its signatories and Tygodnik Powszechny by the authorities. Wańkowicz, was the most severely repressed, being arrested and accused of preparing and forwarding a text containing "false information slandering People's Poland". The writer was convicted and sentenced to three years in prison. However, the Communist authorities, wanting to avoid criticism, did not carry out the sentence, initially de facto, and later the ruling was formally suspended.

From 34 signatories of the Letter Konrad Górski withdrew his signature, after which he wrote a letter to Prime Minister Cyrankiewicz, in which he blamed Turowicz for drawing him into the matter. This letter was read by Zenon Kliszko at a meeting of the Writers' Union.

Ten of the signatories of Letter 34 then signed another letter addressed to The Times, stating that Letter 34 was to be internal and they criticized Radio Free Europe. The letter was signed by: Aleksander Gieysztor, Konrad Górski, Leopold Infeld, Julian Krzyżanowski, Kazimierz Kumaniecki, Edward Lipiński, Wacław Sierpiński, Jan Szczepański, Władysław Tatarkiewicz and Kazimierz Wyka.

Despite this, Polish intellectuals were supported by intellectuals from other countries and letters of support were published in the Italian Il Mondo and the French Le Figaro Littéraire. 13 Harvard professors signed a letter to the ambassador of the Polish People's Republic, and Berkeley professors did the same.

== Bibliography ==
- Jerzy Eisler, List 34, Wydawnictwo Naukowe PWN, Warszawa 1993, ISBN 83-01-11347-2.
- Aleksandra Ziółkowska Proces Melchiora Wańkowicza 1964, Nowe Wydawnictwo Polskie, Warszawa 1990, ISBN 83-85135-08-1.
- Aleksandra Ziółkowska-Boehm Na tropach Wańkowicza po latach, Prószyński i S-ka, Warszawa 1999, 2 wydanie 2009, ISBN 83-7180-349-4, ISBN 978-83-7648-261-3.
- Aleksandra Ziółkowska-Boehm Melchior Wańkowicz Poland’s Master of the Written Word, Rozdział: The Trial of Melchior Wańkowicz: 1964 (strony: 29–103), Lexington Books, USA 2013, ISBN 978-0-7391-7590-3.

== See also ==
- Letter of 59
- Open Letter to the Party
