= Russow =

Russow may refer to:

- Balthasar Russow, one of the most important Livonian and Estonian chroniclers.
- Edmund Russow, a Baltic German biologist.
- Joan Russow, a Canadian peace activist and former national leader of the Green Party of Canada.
- Lev Russov, a Soviet Russian painter, graphic artist, and sculptor
- Mike Russow, an American professional mixed martial artist.
- Russów, a village in Poland.
