= Edward Lipiński =

Edward Lipiński may refer to:

- Edward Lipiński (economist)
- Edward Lipiński (orientalist)
