= Mieczysław Klimowicz =

Polish historian

- Born: December 14, 1919; Sokal, Second Polish Republic
- Died: August 26, 2008 (aged 88); Wrocław, Lower Silesian Voivodeship, Third Polish Republic
- Board member of: International Comparative Literature Association

Academic background
- Education: Bolesław Bierut University of Wrocław

Academic work
- Discipline: History
- Sub-discipline: Age of Enlightenment
- World War II
- Allegiance: Home Army
- Service years: 1939-1947
- Units: ZWZ (1939-45); WiN (1945-47)

Sejm deputy
- In office 1972–1976

Mieczysław Klimowicz (December 14, 1919, Sokal – August 26, 2008 Wrocław) was a Polish World War II historian, statesman (Sejm deputy, 1972–1976), World War II fighter, and rector of the University of Wrocław (1987–1990).

His main interests included the history of Polish literature and theatre of the Age of Enlightenment.

== Major books ==
- 1953: Prekursorzy Oświecenia (with Roman Kaleta), Ossolineum Publishing House
- 1965: Początki teatru stanisławowskiego, State Publishing Institute PIW.
- 1988: Literatura Oświecenia, Polish Scientific Publishers PWN

== Awards ==
- Knight's and Officer's crosses of the Order of Polonia Restituta
- Silver Cross of Merit
- Knight's and Officer's crosses of the Ordre des Palmes Académiques
