= Paweł Hertz =

Polish writer (1918–2001)

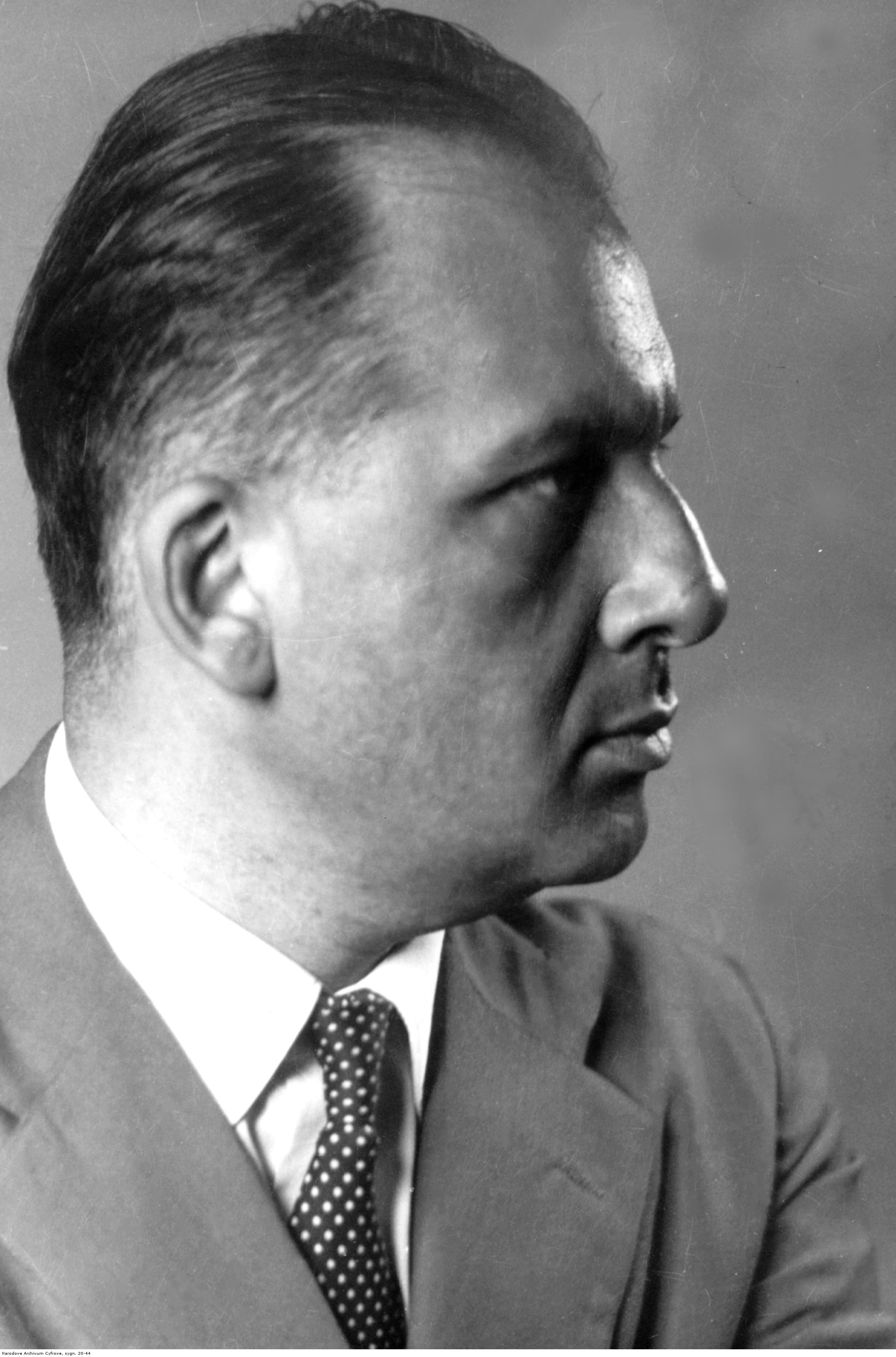
- Paweł Hertz between 1947–57
- Born: 29 October 1918; Warsaw
- Died: 13 May 2001 (aged 82); Warsaw
- Occupations: Writer; poet; translator; publisher

Paweł Hertz (29 October 1918 – 13 May 2001) was a Polish writer, poet, translator and publisher.

== Life ==
He was born in a family of Polish Jews to Michał Hertz and Paulina nee Turower. He attended Gimnazjum im. Mikołaja Reja in Warsaw, dropped out on his own volition and never attempted the final exams. In 1935–1937 he traveled through Austria and Italy, sometimes accompanied by people such as Jarosław Iwaszkiewicz. Late 1937 he started living in Paris where he attended lectures on Écoles des Hautes Études Internationales.

In the summer of 1939, he returned to Poland. After the outbreak of World War II, he reached Lviv via the Stradecz estate. There, in January 1940, he was arrested and imprisoned by the Russians in the Zamarstyniv prison, and then sentenced to eight years in the camp, after which he was sent to the camp in Ivdel in Siberia through the prisons in Kherson and Dnepropetrovsk. After the Sikorski–Mayski agreement and the amnesty, he reached the Polish delegation in Almaty. In 1942, at the request of the delegation of the Polish Embassy, he started organizing Polish schools in Kyrgyzstan, and then became a representative of the Polish embassy. After the break of diplomatic relations between the Polish government and the Soviet authorities, he was arrested again. After his release, he went to Samarkand, where until the fall of 1944 he worked as a librarian of the Samarkand District Museum and a bibliographer at the A. Pushkin. He described his experiences from this period, among others in the book Sedan (1948). He returned to Poland in December 1945 and initially settled in Łódź, in 1949 he moved permanently to Warsaw, where he continued his creative work and worked as an editor.

Since 1945, he was a member of staff of a weekly „Kuźnica", and became a member of PPR (in 1948 renamed to PZPR). Soon he took an oppositional stance to the party. In 1957 he left PZPR. In March 1964 he signed Letter of 34 in defense of freedom of speech. W 1969 he became a member of Polish PEN Club board. In the years 1975–1978 he was vice-president, and from December 1980 a member of the board of the Polish Writers' Union. He was a member of the Council for the Pastoral Care of Creative Communities (Rada Duszpasterstwa Środowisk Twórczych) and the Council for Polish-Jewish Relations (Rada do Spraw Stosunków Polsko-Żydowskich) under the President of the Republic of Poland (1991–1995). He was a correspondent member of the Institut für die Wissenschaften vom Menschen in Vienna. He was buried at the Powązki Cemetery in Warsaw (section 119–6–17). Czesław Miłosz based a character of Piotr Kwinto from the novel Zdobycie władzy (1955) on Hertz.

=== Private life ===
Hertz left no diaries or autobiographies, and in his interview Sposób Życia published in 1997 he posed as a heterosexual, old-fashioned misanthrope, never using the word "homosexual" in any context in the book. As an adult, Hertz tried to hide both his Jewish origins and sexual orientation. Both became known to the Polish People's Republic authorities, up to a point of a delation archived in IPN explicitly calling Hertz homosexual and drawing attention to his relationship with Henryk Krzeczkowski. Hertz was affiliated with Catholic Church for a long time, but became baptized only at the age of 60.

In gay circles he was sometimes called "the princess of Israel".

== Career ==
He debuted aged 16 with a poem Popiół (Ash) in „Wiadomości Literackie" (1934 issue 29), in the interwar period he published his poems also in „Skamander" magazine. His first volume of collected poems Nocna muzyka (Night music) was out when he was 17 (1935). Following years he published his poems in „Tygodnik Powszechny", „Nowa Kultura", „Kuźnica", „Więź", „Znaki czasu", „Zeszyty Literackie". His closest friends included Jarosław Iwaszkiewicz, Czesław Miłosz, Zygmunt Mycielski, Antoni Sobański, Stefan Kisielewski, Julian Stryjkowski, Henryk Krzeczkowski; he kept in touch with the staff of Paris' "Kultura" – incl. Józef Czapski, Zygmunt Hertz, Konstanty Jeleński. In 1945–48 he belonged to staff of „Kuźnica".In the years 1949–52 he was the head of the editorial board of classical Russian literature at the State Publishing Institute, 1954–1959 he was a member of the editorial committee of the Dictionary of the Polish Language, and in the years 1955–1978 and 1979–1982 he co-edited "Rocznik Literacki", in 1978 he joined the editorial board of the journal " Res Publica" (then "Nowa Res Publica "), in 1990 he belonged to the editorial board of Tygodnik „Solidarność". In 1957 he was one of the initiators and members of the editorial board of the monthly "Europa" (the magazine was suspended by the authorities before the first issue was published). He prepared a monumental 7-volume anthology of 19th-century Polish poetry, Zbiór poetów polskich XIX-wieku (Collection of 19th-century Polish poets) (vol. I – VII, 1959–1979). He compiled Księga cytatów z polskiej literatury pięknej (Book of citations from Polish literature) (with Władysław Kopaliński, 1975), and edited numerous editions of Polish writers and poets (incl. Kazimiera Iłłakowiczówna, Jan Kasprowicz, Zygmunt Krasiński, Teofil Lenartowicz, Juliusz Słowacki). He initiated the reprinting of books valuable for Polish culture (he was a member of the Program Council for Reprinting at the Art and Film Publishing House – Rada Programowa do Spraw Reprintów przy Wydawnictwach Artystycznych i Filmowych). 1977 he initiated in Państwowy Instytut Wydawniczy series „Podróże", (travels) where he redacted and published 18 volumes of classic travel literature. He redacted polish anthologies of Fyodor Dostoevsky, Alexander Pushkin, Leo Tolstoy. He has been awarded many times for his translation work, which included translating Anna Achmatowa, Joseph Brodsky, Jacob Burckhardt, Anton Chekhov, Fyodor Dostoevsky, Hugo von Hofmannsthal, Pavel Muratov, Marcel Proust, Ivan Turgenev.

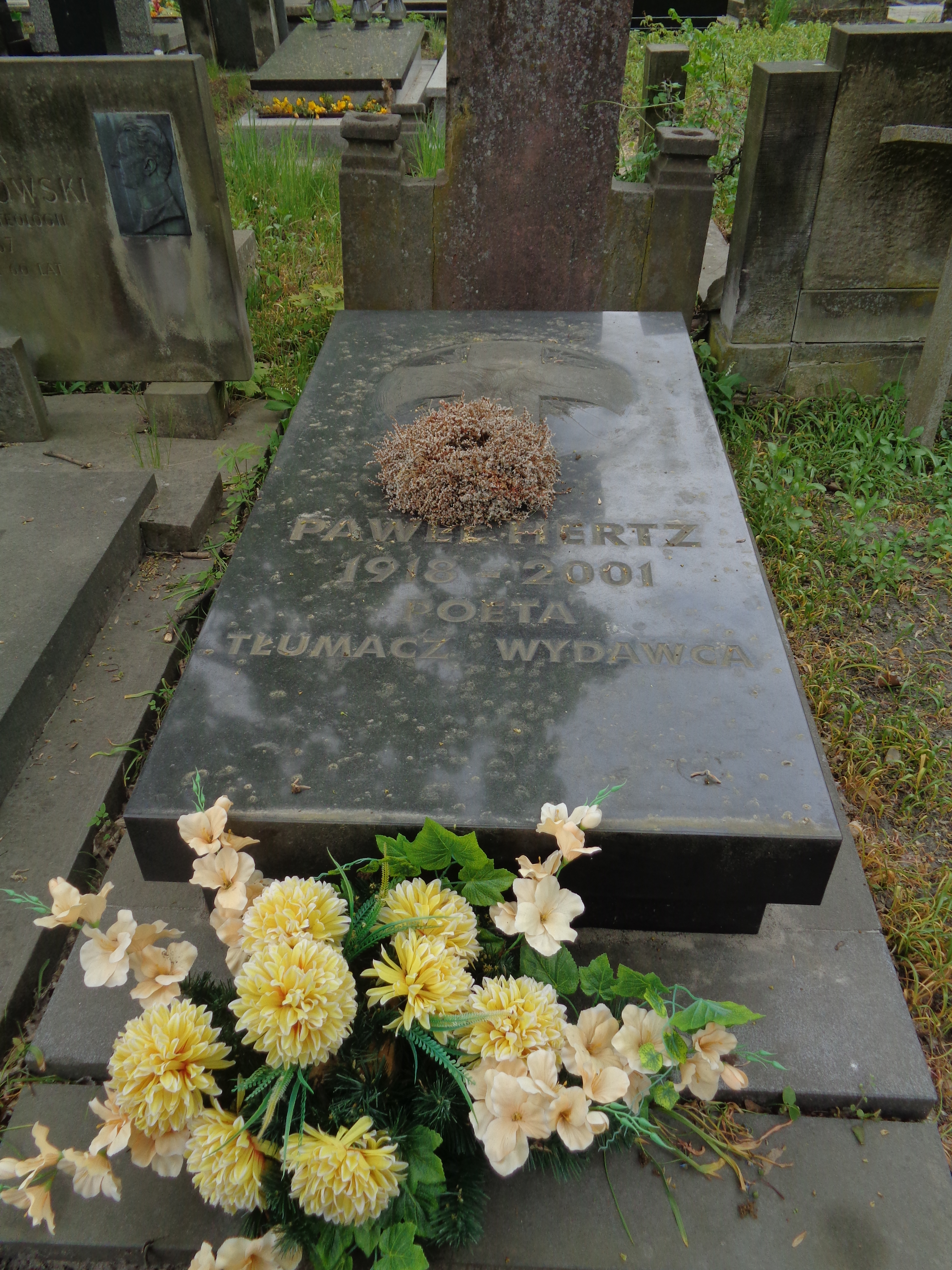
Grave of Paweł Hertz on Powązkowski Cemetery in Warsaw

== Works ==
=== Poetry ===
- Nocna muzyka (Night Music), Warszawa, Sfinks, 1935
- Szarfa ciemności, Warszawa, F. Hoesick, 1937
- Dwie podróże (Two Journeys), Warszawa, Czytelnik, 1946
- Małe ody i treny (Small Odes and Laments), Warszawa, KiW, 1949
- Nowy lirnik mazowiecki (New Mazovian Lyrist), Warszawa, Czytelnik, 1953
- Wiersze wybrane (Selected Poems), Warszawa, PIW, 1955
- Pieśni z rynku (Songs from the Market), Warszawa, PIW, 1957
- Śpiewnik podróżny i domowy (Travel and Home Songbook), Warszawa, PIW, 1969
- Poezje (Poems), Warszawa, PIW, 1983
- Poezje wybrane (Selected Poems), Warszawa, LSW, 1992

=== Prose and essays ===
- Z naszej loży (From Our Lounge) (with J. Rojewski), Łódź, Poligrafika, 1946
- Notatnik obserwatora (Notepad of an Observer), Łódź, W. Bąk, 1948
- Sedan, Warszawa, Książka, 1948
- Portret Słowackiego (Portrait of Słowacki), Warszawa, PIW, 1949 (last ed. Zeszyty Literackie, 2009)
- Dziennik lektury (Diary of a Lecture), Warszawa, PIW, 1954
- Notatki z obu brzegów Wisły (Notes from Both Banks of Vistula), Warszawa, Czytelnik, 1955
- Domena polska (Polish Domain), Warszawa, PIW, 1961
- Słowacki. Romans życia (Słowacki. Romance of Life), Warszawa, PIW, 1961
- Ład i nieład (Order and Disorder), Warszawa, PIW, 1964
- Wieczory warszawskie (Warsaw Evenings), Warszawa, Czytelnik, 1974
- Świat i dom (World and Home), Warszawa, PIW, 1977
- Miary i wagi (Measures and Weights), Warszawa, PIW, 1978
- Patrzę się inaczej (I Look Differently), Warszawa, Pavo, 1994
- Gra tego świata (Game of This World), Warszawa, Więź, 1997
- Sposób życia (Way of Life).Interview with Paweł Hertz by Barbara R. Łopieńska, Warszawa, PIW, 1997
- Szkice warszawskie. (Warsaw Sketches) selected and redacted by Marek Zagańczyk. Warszawa, Muzeum Warszawy, 2016

=== Letters ===
- Letters to Czesław Miłosz, in: Czesław Miłosz, Zaraz po wojnie. Korespondencja z pisarzami 1945–1950, Kraków, Znak, 1998.
- Correspondence with Jarosław Iwaszkiewicz, in: „Zeszyty Literackie” nr 81, 101, 103.
- Correspondence with Aleksander Wat, in: Aleksander Wat, Korespondencja, volume I and II, Warszawa, Czytelnik, 2005.
- Paweł Hertz / Anna and Jarosław Iwaszkiewicz, Korespondencja, Warszawa, Zeszyty Literackie, 2015

=== Selected translations ===
- Ilya Ehrenburg Upadek Paryża (The Fall of Paris), Warszawa, Książka, 1946
- Leo Tolstoy Dzieciństwo; Lata Chłopięce; Młodość (Childhood / Детство, Boyhood / Отрочество, Youth / Юность), Warszawa, Czytelnik, 1950
- Ivan Turgenev Opowiadania wybrane, Warszawa, KiW, 1951
- Anatole France Czerwona Lilia (Le Lys rouge / The Red Lily), Warszawa, Czytelnik, 1960
- Anatole France Historia komiczna (Histoire comique / A Mummer's Tale), Warszawa, Czytelnik, 1962
- Georges Lenôtre Ze starych papierów, Warszawa, Czytelnik, 1965
- Marcel Proust Jan Santeuil (Jean Santeuil), t. I–II, Warszawa, PIW, 1969
- Pavel Muratov Obrazy Włoch, t. I–II, Warszawa, PIW, 1972 (ostatnie wyd. Zeszyty Literackie, 2006–2012)
- Viktor Lazarev Dawni mistrzowie (Old Italian Masters / Старые итальянские мастера), Warszawa, PWN, 1984
- Martin Buber Opowieści chasydów (Die Erzählungen der Chassidim), Poznań, W Drodze, 1986 (last edition Zeszyty Literackie, 2005)
- Jacob Burckhardt Czasy Konstantyna Wielkiego (Die Zeit Constantins des Großen), Warszawa, PIW, 1992
- Astolphe de Custine Rosja w roku 1839 (La Russie en 1839), t. I–II, Warszawa, PIW, 1995
- Hugo von Hofmannsthal Księga przyjaciół i szkice wybrane (Buch der Freunde, Aphorismen), Kraków, WL, 1997

=== Selected editorial work ===
- Alexander Pushkin Dzieła wybrane (Selected Works), t. I–VI, Warszawa, PIW, 1953–1954
- Ivan Turgenev Z pism (From Writings), t. I–IX, Warszawa, PIW, 1953–1956
- Fyodor Dostoevsky Z pism (From Writings), t. I–X, Warszawa, PIW, 1955–1964
- Leo Tolstoy Dzieła (Works), t. I–XIV, Warszawa, PIW, 1956–1958
- Zbiór poetów polskich XIX-wieku (Anthology of Polish Poets of 19th Century), t. I–VII, Warszawa, PIW, 1959–1979
- Zygmunt Krasiński Dzieła literackie (Literary Works), t. I–III, Warszawa, PIW, 1973
- Księga cytatów z polskiej literatury pięknej (Book of Quotes from Polish Literature) (with Władysław Kopaliński), Warszawa, PIW, 1975
- Juliusz Słowacki Dzieła wybrane (Selected Works) (with Marian Bizan), t. I–III, Warszawa, PIW, 1986
- Portret młodego artysty. Listy Józefa Rajnfelda do Jarosława Iwaszkiewicza (Letters by Józef Rajnfeld to Jarosław Iwaszkiewicz) (with Marek Zagańczyk), Warszawa, Tenten, 1997

== Literary awards ==
- PEN Club award for translations of French literature (1971)
- Fundacja Alfreda Jurzykowskiego award (1972)
- PEN Club award for outstanding editorial work (1978)
- Literatura na Świecie award for translation work (1995)
- ZAiKS award for translation work (1996)

== Orders and decorations ==
- Knight's Cross of Order of Polonia Restituta (1974)
- Commander's Cross of Order of Polonia Restituta (1996)
