= Sokal =

City in Lviv Oblast, Ukraine

Sokal Сокаль
- City
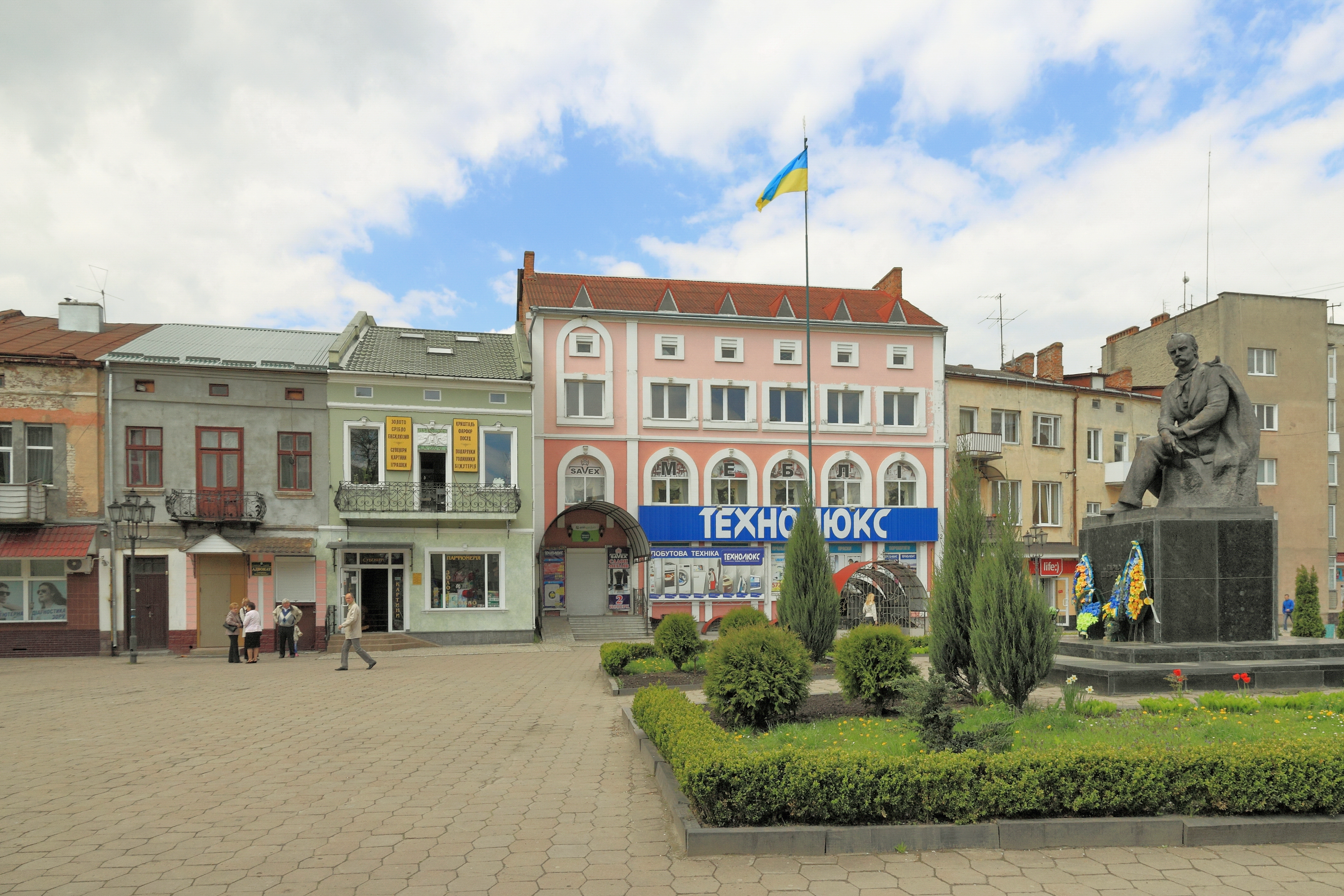
- Townhouses on the square in the city center

- Flag Coat of arms

- Location within Lviv Oblast Location within Ukraine
- Coordinates: 50°29′N 24°17′E
- Country: Ukraine
- Province: Lviv Oblast
- District: Sheptytskyi Raion
- Hromada: Sokal urban hromada
- First mentioned: 1377

Population (2022)
  - Total: 20,373
- Time zone: UTC+2 (EET)
  - Summer (DST): UTC+3 (EEST)

Sokal (Ukrainian: Сокаль, IPA: [soˈkɑlʲ]) is a city located on the Bug River in Sheptytskyi Raion, Lviv Oblast of western Ukraine. It hosts the administration of Sokal urban hromada, one of the hromadas of Ukraine. The population is approximately 20,373 (2022 estimate).

== History ==
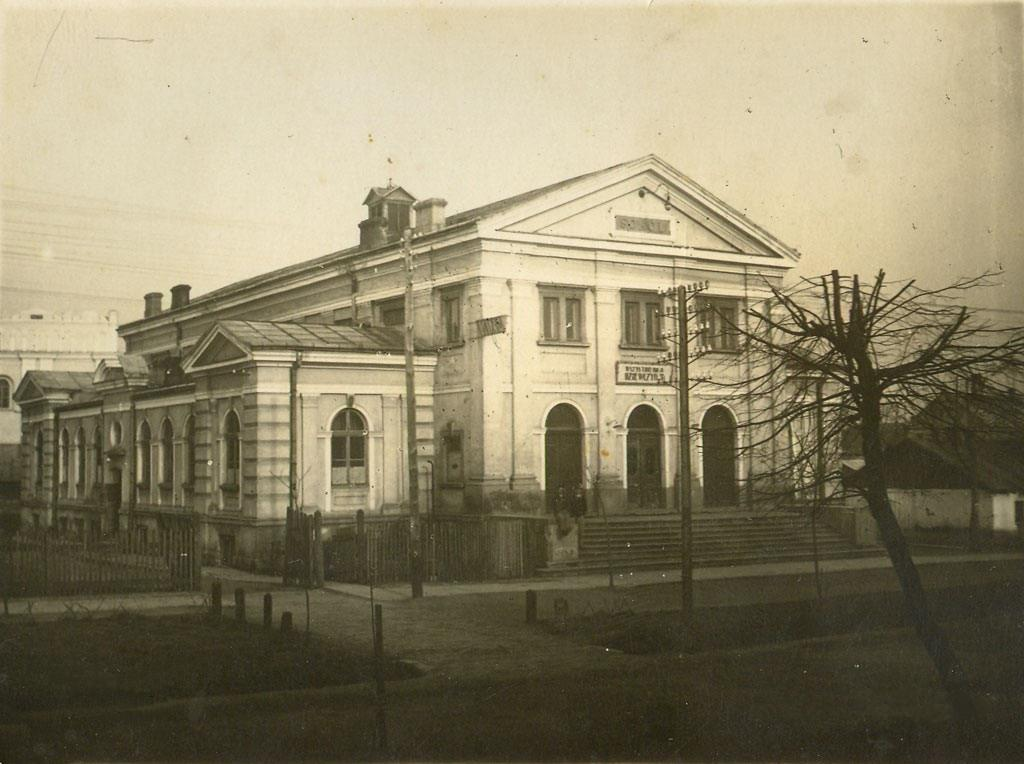
Building of the Sokół Polish Gymnastic Society in the 1930s

The first written mention of Sokal under its current name is usually dated to 1377, although the Encyclopedia of Ukraine gives 1411. In 1424, it received Magdeburg rights from Siemowit IV, Duke of Masovia, and in 1462, the town became part of Bełz Voivodeship, Lesser Poland Province. On August 2, 1519, following the defeat of a Polish-Lithuanian army under Hetman Konstanty Ostrogski by Crimean Tatars, the town was razed by the invaders. Mikołaj Sęp Szarzyński later dedicated one of his poems to this battle. In 1619, Armenians in Sokal were first mentioned.

The town remained part of Poland until the First Partition of Poland, when it was annexed by the Habsburg Empire, as part of Galicia. It was the capital of the Sokal district, one of the 78 Bezirkshauptmannschaften in the Austrian Galicia province (Crown land) in 1900. After World War I, possession of this province was disputed between Poland and Soviet Russia, until the 1921 Peace of Riga, which attributed Eastern Galicia to Poland. In the Second Polish Republic, Sokal was the seat of a county in Lwów Voivodeship.

Sokal was in Polish territory until the German invasion of Poland in September 1939. From September 1939 until June 1941 (see Operation Barbarossa), it was part of Soviet-occupied territory. Before the Holocaust, Sokal had a Jewish population of 5,200; in addition, thousands of refugees from other parts of Poland arrived in Sokal. On September 17, 1942, 2,000 Jews from Sokal were deported to Bełżec extermination camp. There was a severe water shortage in the Sokal ghetto. On October 24, 1942, a further 2,500 Jews from the town were deported to the Bełżec gas chambers. On May 27, 1943, the ghetto was liquidated and the town declared 'judenrein'. Only 30 Jews from the town survived the war, including 15 members of 3 families rescued by the Halamajowa family, consisting of the Polish Catholic grandmother Franciszka, her daughter and son (see No.4 Street of Our Lady). The Soviet army recaptured the town in July 1944, though the western part of the town (the former village of Zhvirka) remained part of Poland between 1944 and 1951 (see 1951 Polish–Soviet territorial exchange).

In the early 17th century, a large Baroque monastery of the Bernardine monks, together with the Roman Catholic church of the Virgin Mary was built in Sokal. The complex is located in the district of Zhvirka, and until World War II, it housed a painting of Our Lady of Sokal, which attracted Catholic pilgrims. Jan Ostroróg, one of the first Polish humanists was buried in the town. After World War II, the painting was moved to a church in Hrubieszów, while the monastery was turned into a prison. On March 27, 2012, the historic complex was almost completely destroyed by fire.

Until 18 July 2020, Sokal was the administrative center of Sokal Raion. The raion was abolished in July 2020 as part of the administrative reform of Ukraine, which reduced the number of raions of Lviv Oblast to seven. The area of Sokal Raion was merged into Chervonohrad Raion (modern Sheptytskyi Raion).

== Notable people ==
- Mieczyslaw Klimowicz, World War II historian
- Franciszka Halamajowa, subject of No. 4 Street of Our Lady
- Czesław Hernas, philologist and folklorist
- Omelan Pleszkewycz, co-founder of the Selfreliance Ukrainian American Credit Union in Chicago and president of the World Council of Ukrainian Credit Unions
- Walter Smishek, politician and labour leader in Saskatchewan

== In fiction ==
Sokal is the location of the opening of the 2009 novel The Kindly Ones by Jonathan Littell, which takes place immediately following the German invasion of Soviet-occupied Poland in June 1941. Sokal is mentioned in The Good Soldier Švejk by Jaroslav Hašek as the town passed by Austro-Hungarian soldiers on the way to the battlefields of World War I. The short story Squadron Commander Trunov by Isaac Babel centres around the burial of the title character in the public gardens next to Sokal's cathedral.

== In film ==
Sokal was the setting for two documentary films: One was the No.4 Street of Our Lady (2009) about the rescue of three Jewish families in Sokal by Franciczka Halamajowa family, and the other was The Same Snowy Ground (2020), that featured the ruined synagogue and the new park and told the tale of the town's Jewish community. In connection with the latter film, Haaretz reported on the production taking place in Sokal and on efforts to commemorate the town's destroyed Jewish community.

== Gallery ==
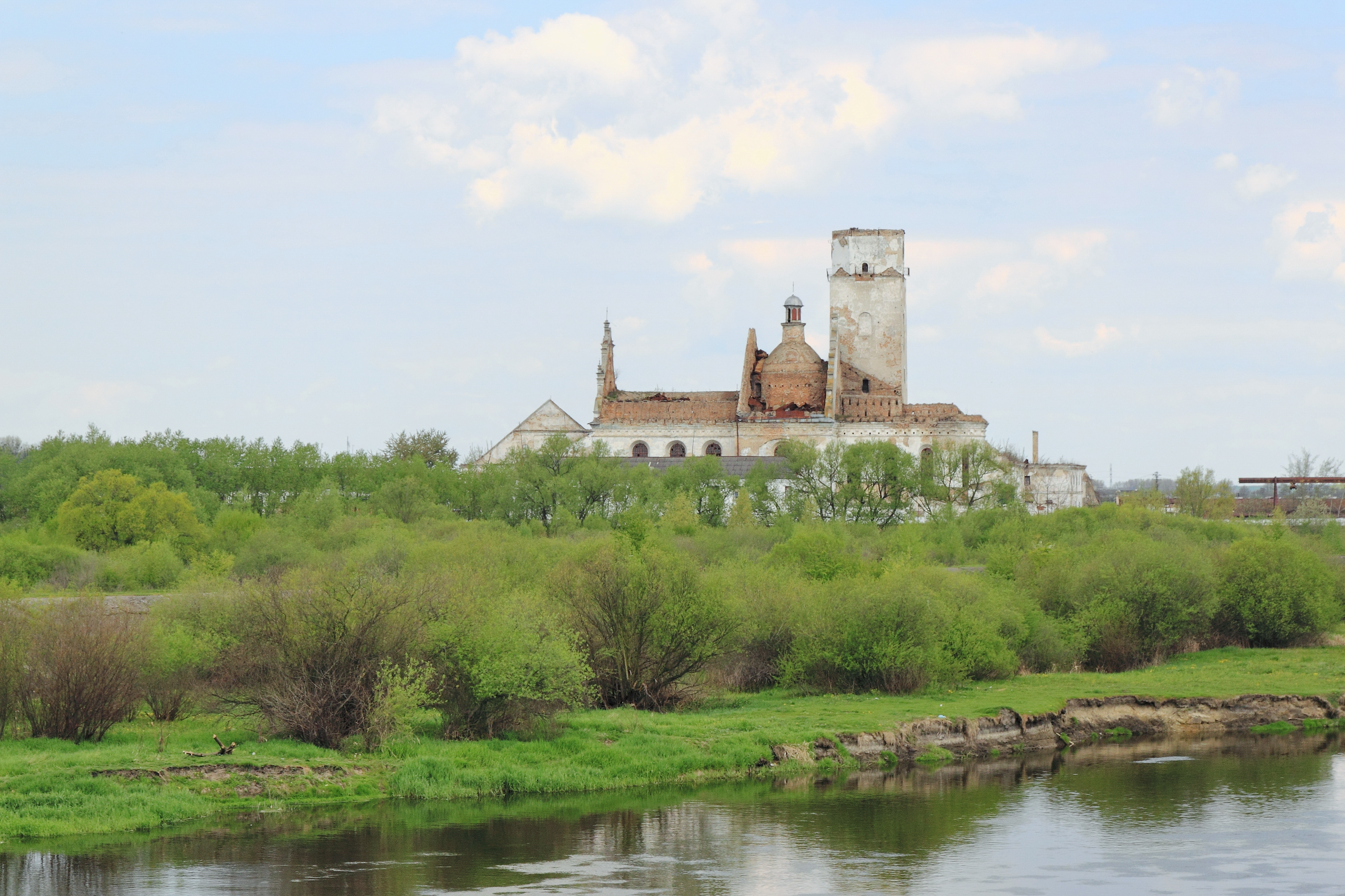
Bernardine Monastery

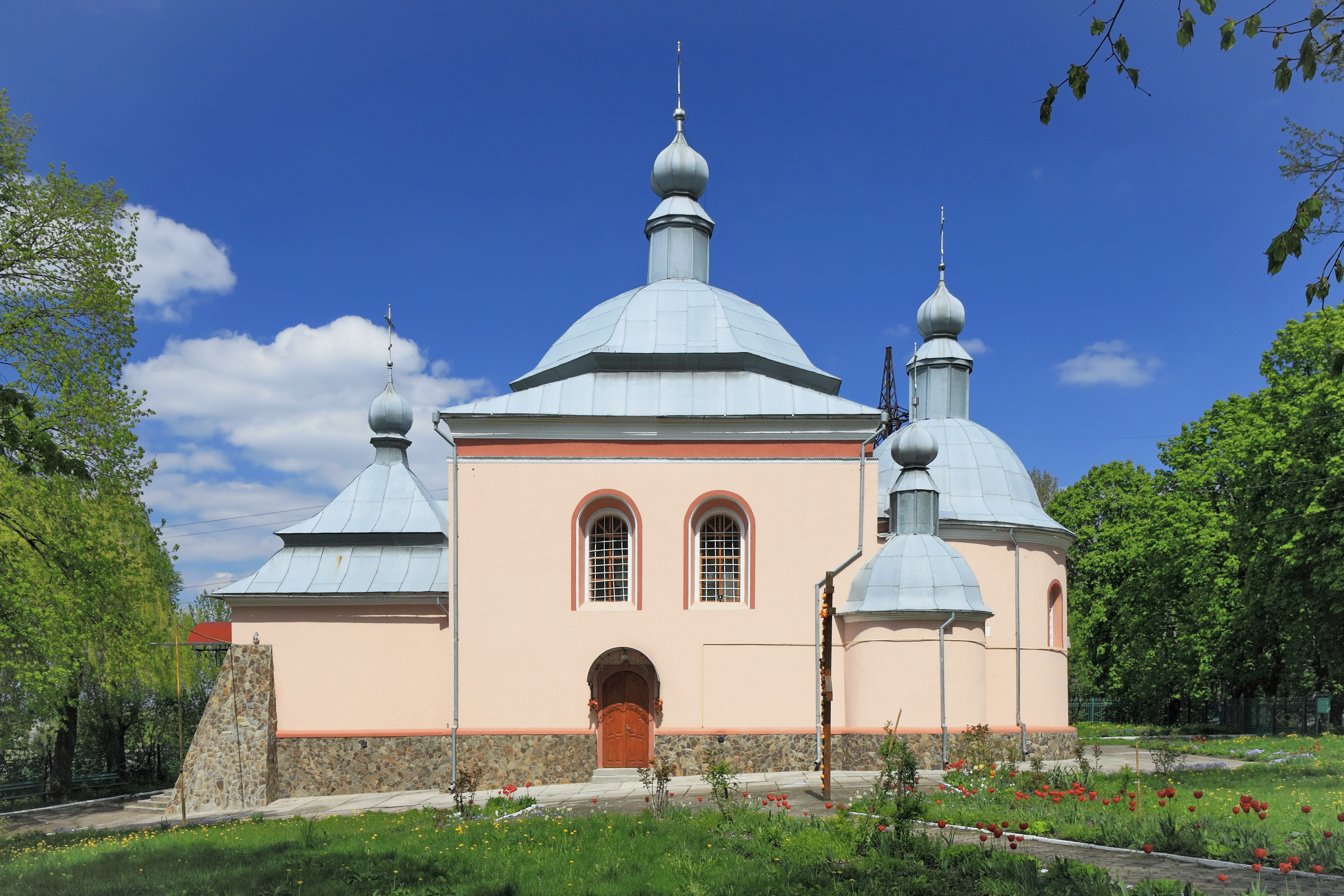
Saint Nicholas church

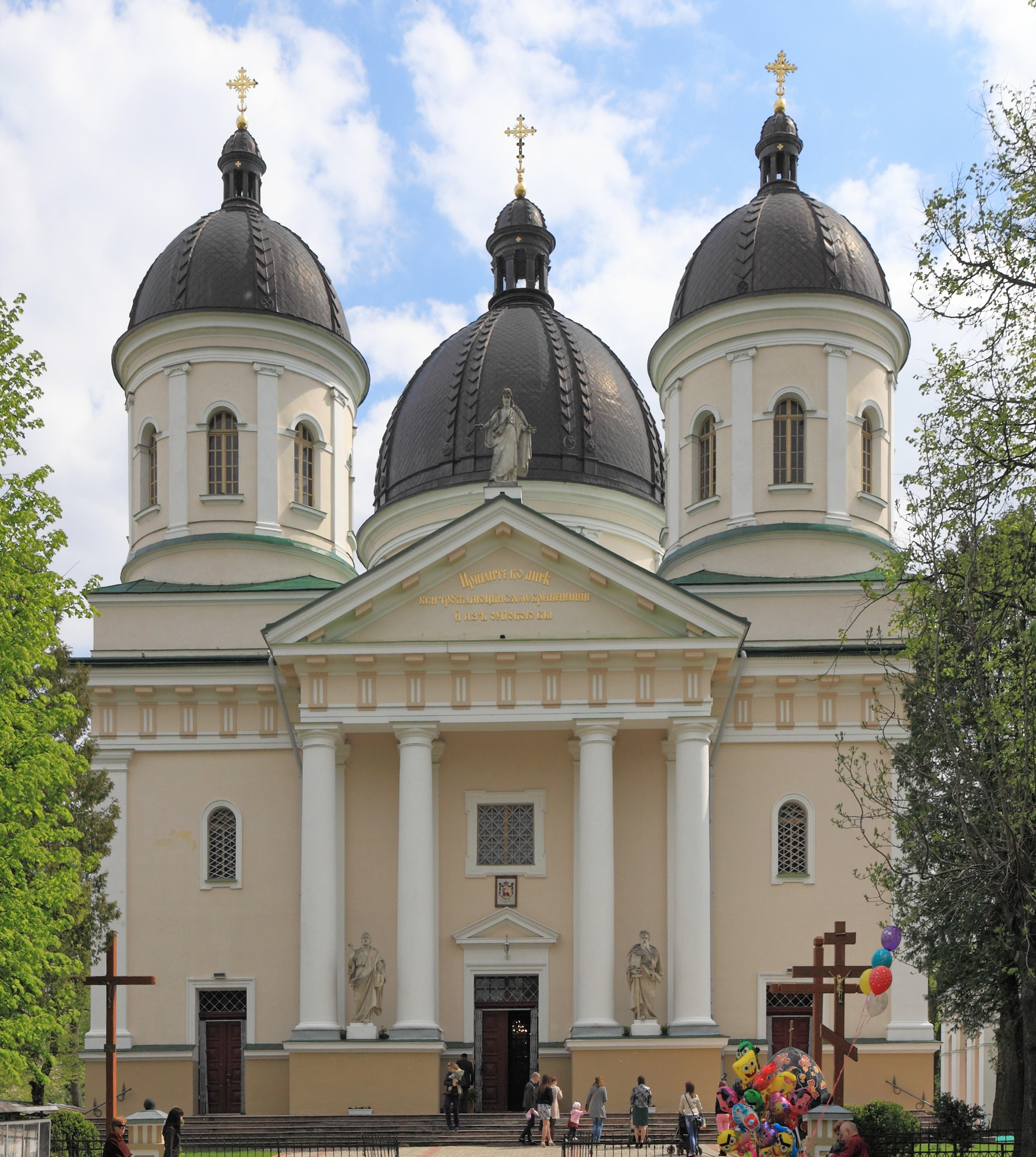
Cathedral of Saints Apostles Peter and Paul

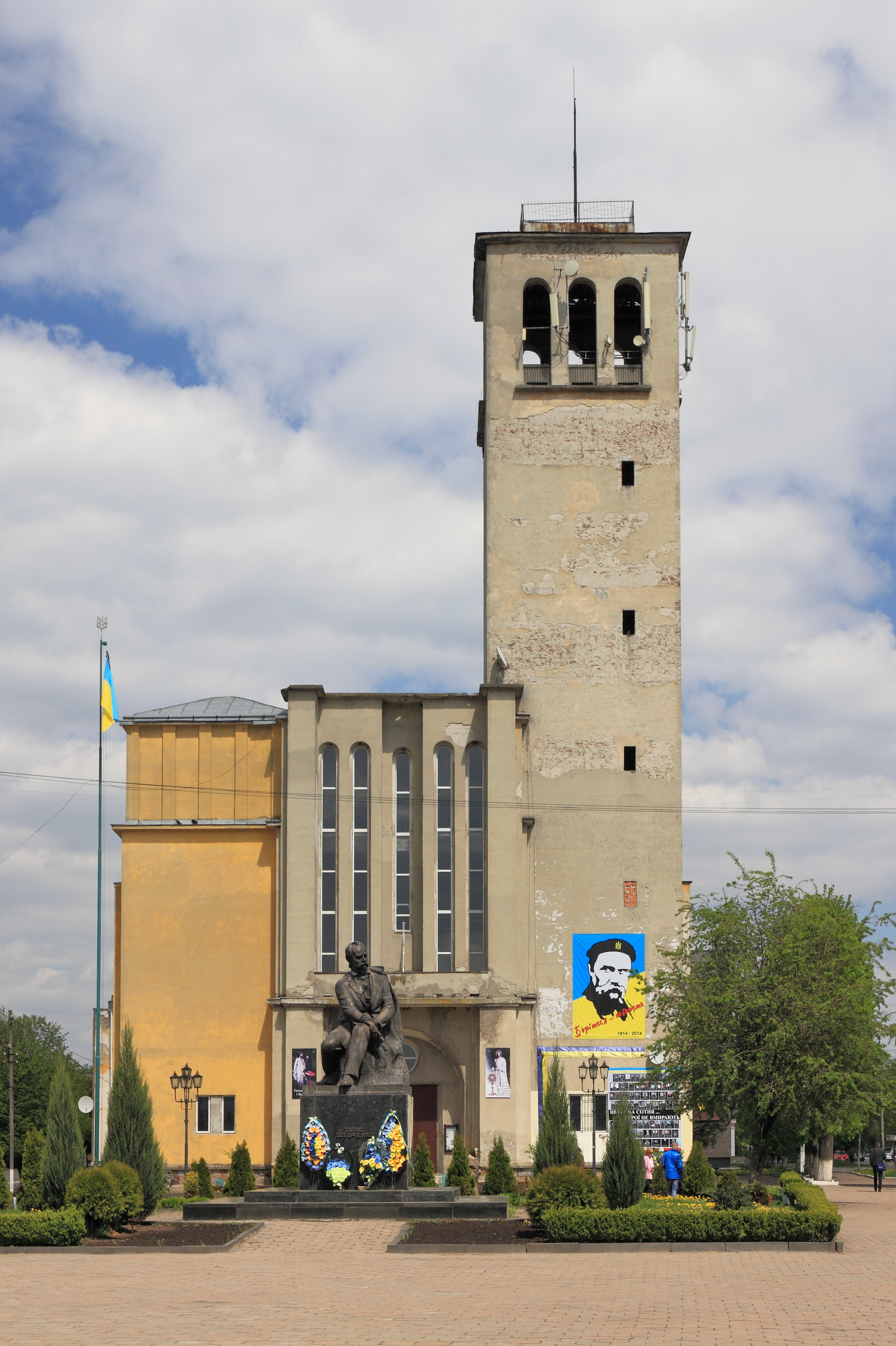
Roman Catholic Church

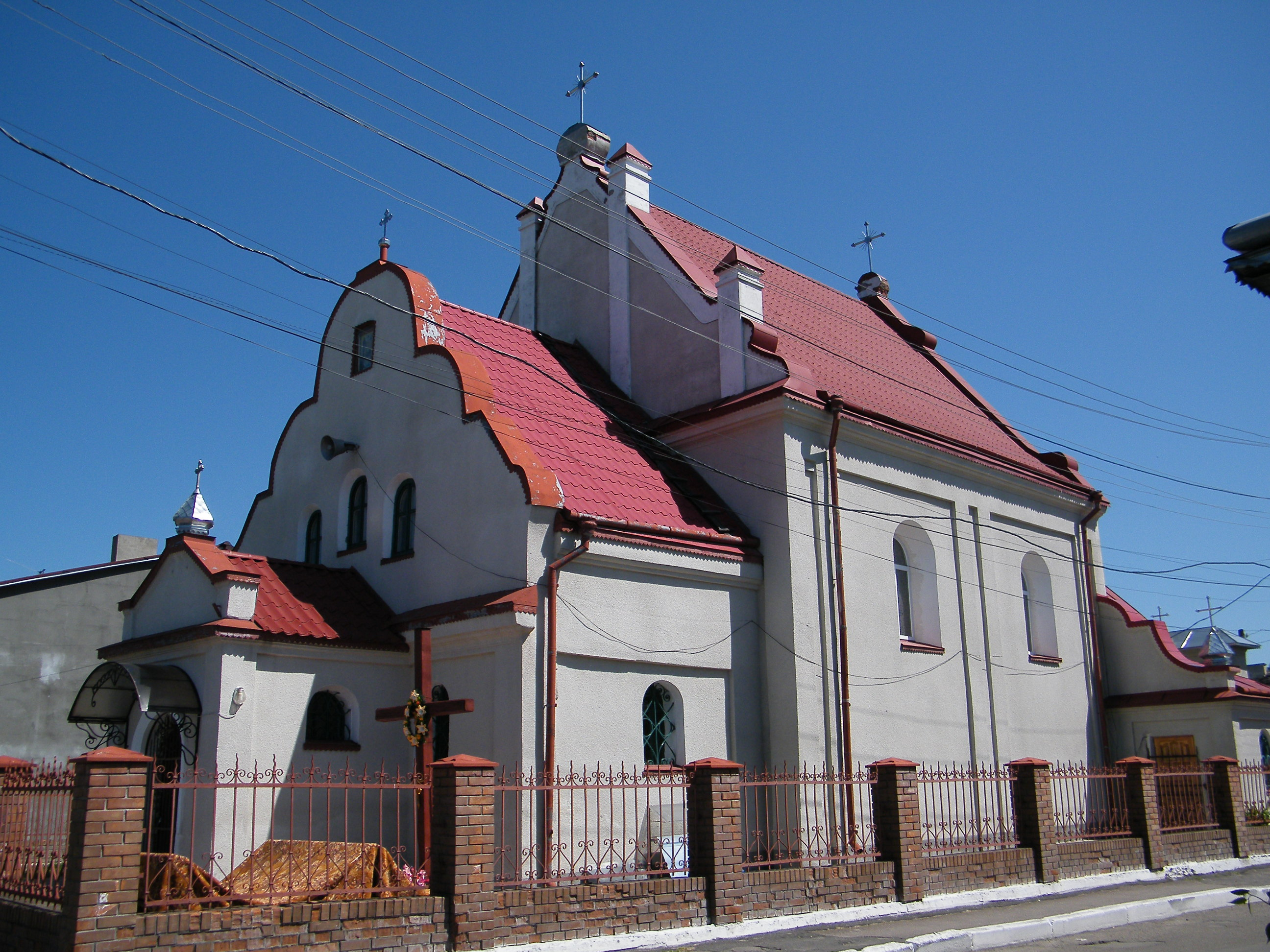
Church of Archangel Michael

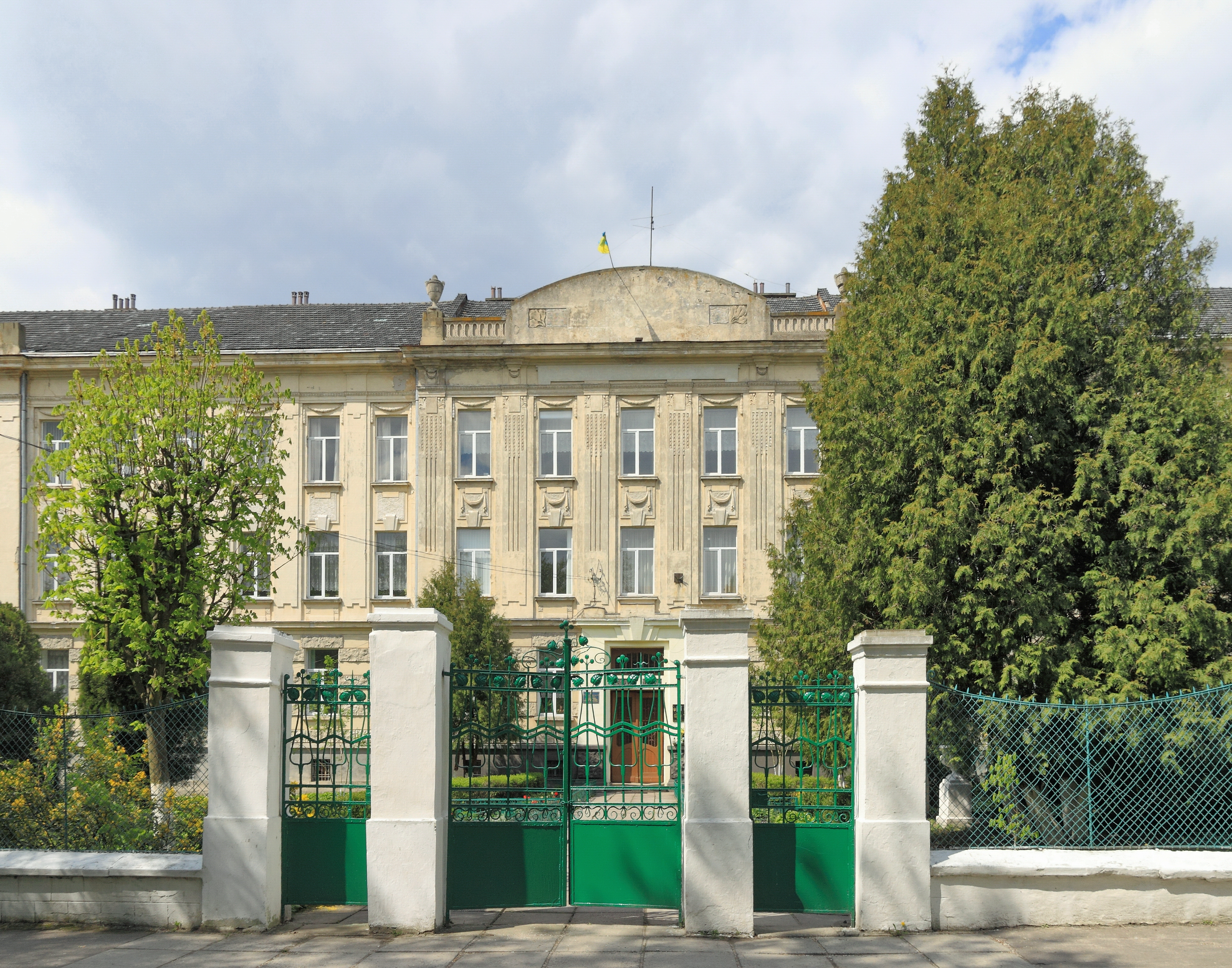
Gymnasium

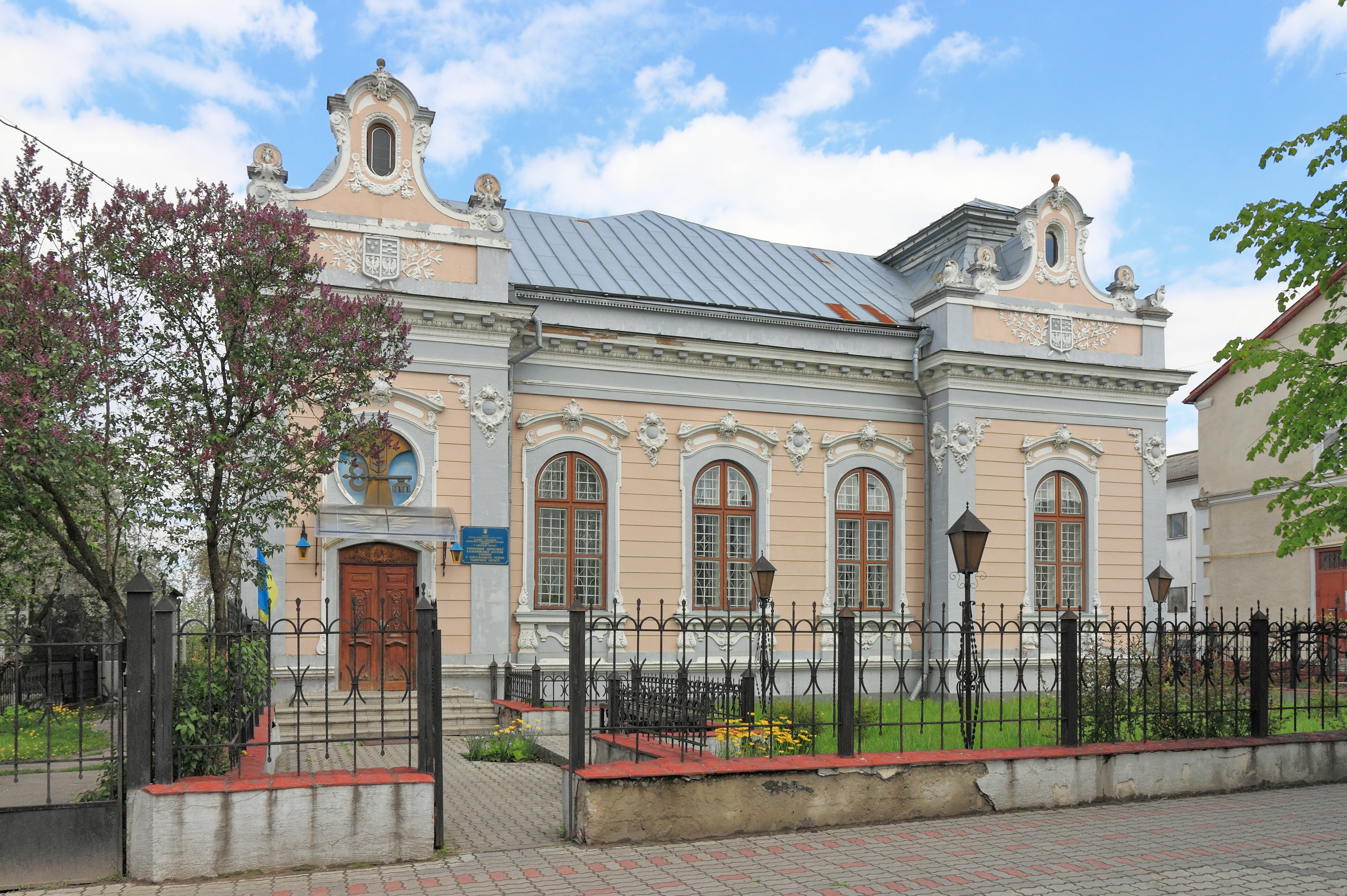
Department of State Treasury in Sokal district

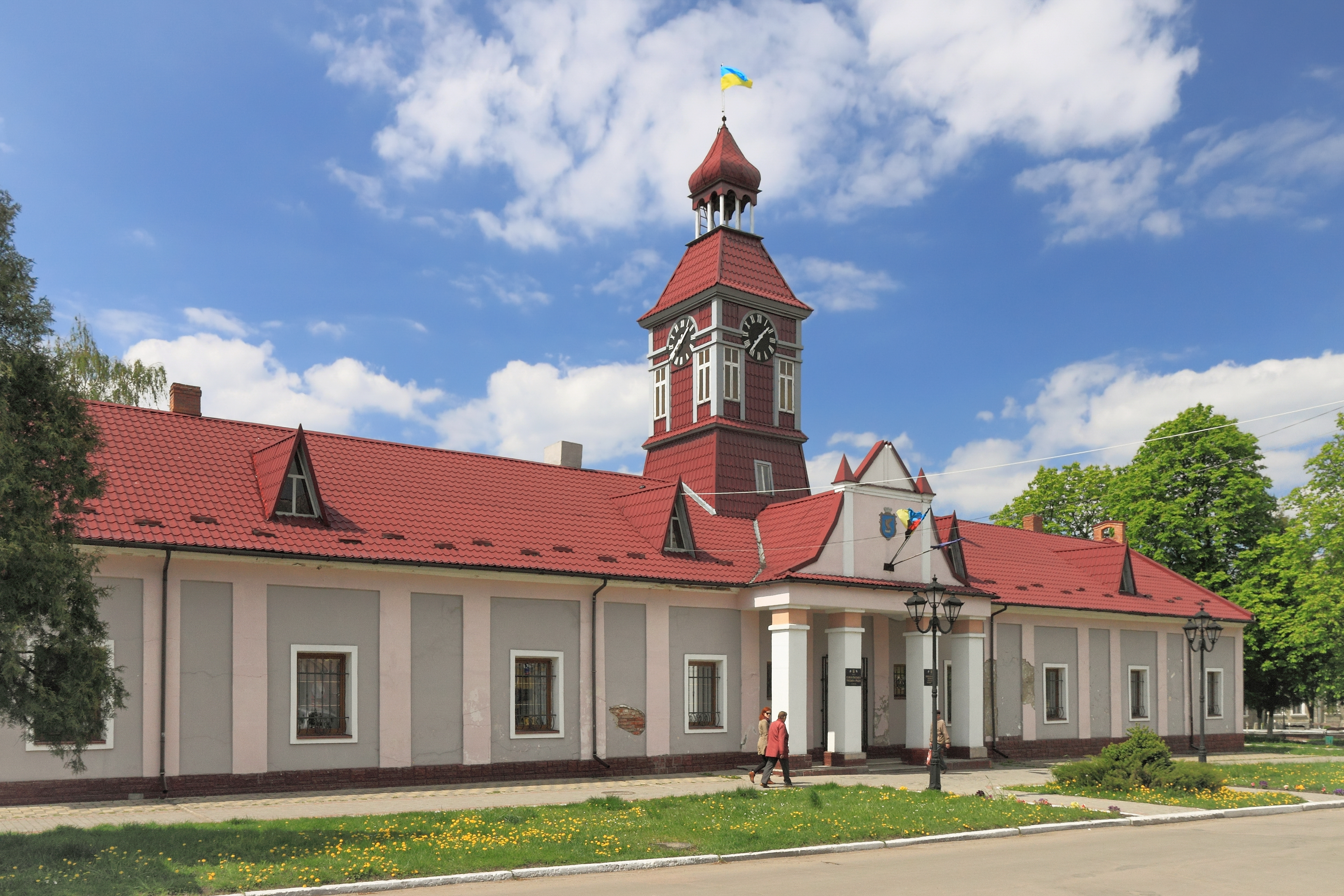
City hall of Sokal

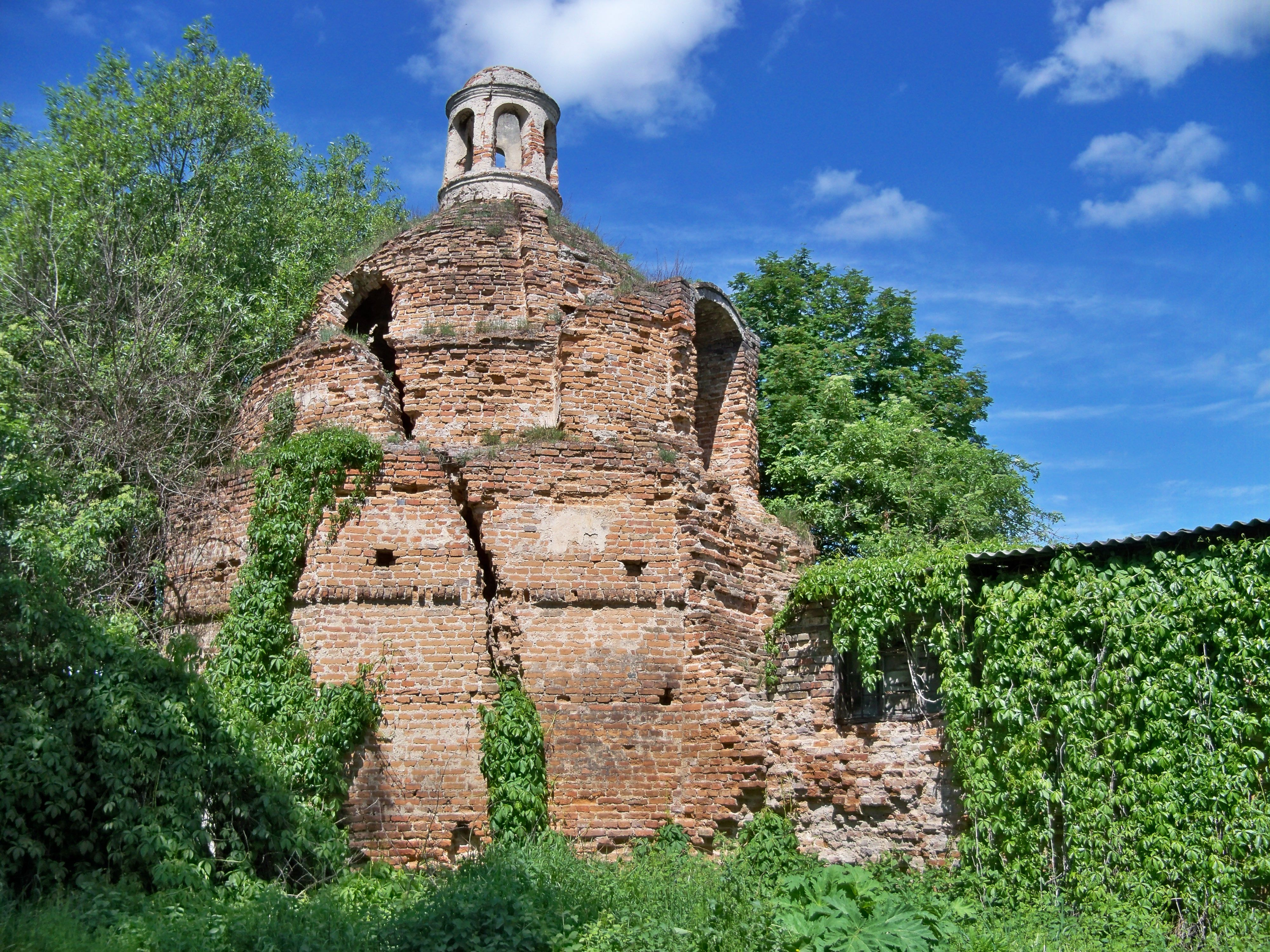
Tower and walls of Bridgettines convent
