= Maria Dąbrowska =

Polish writer, novelist, essayist, journalist and playwright

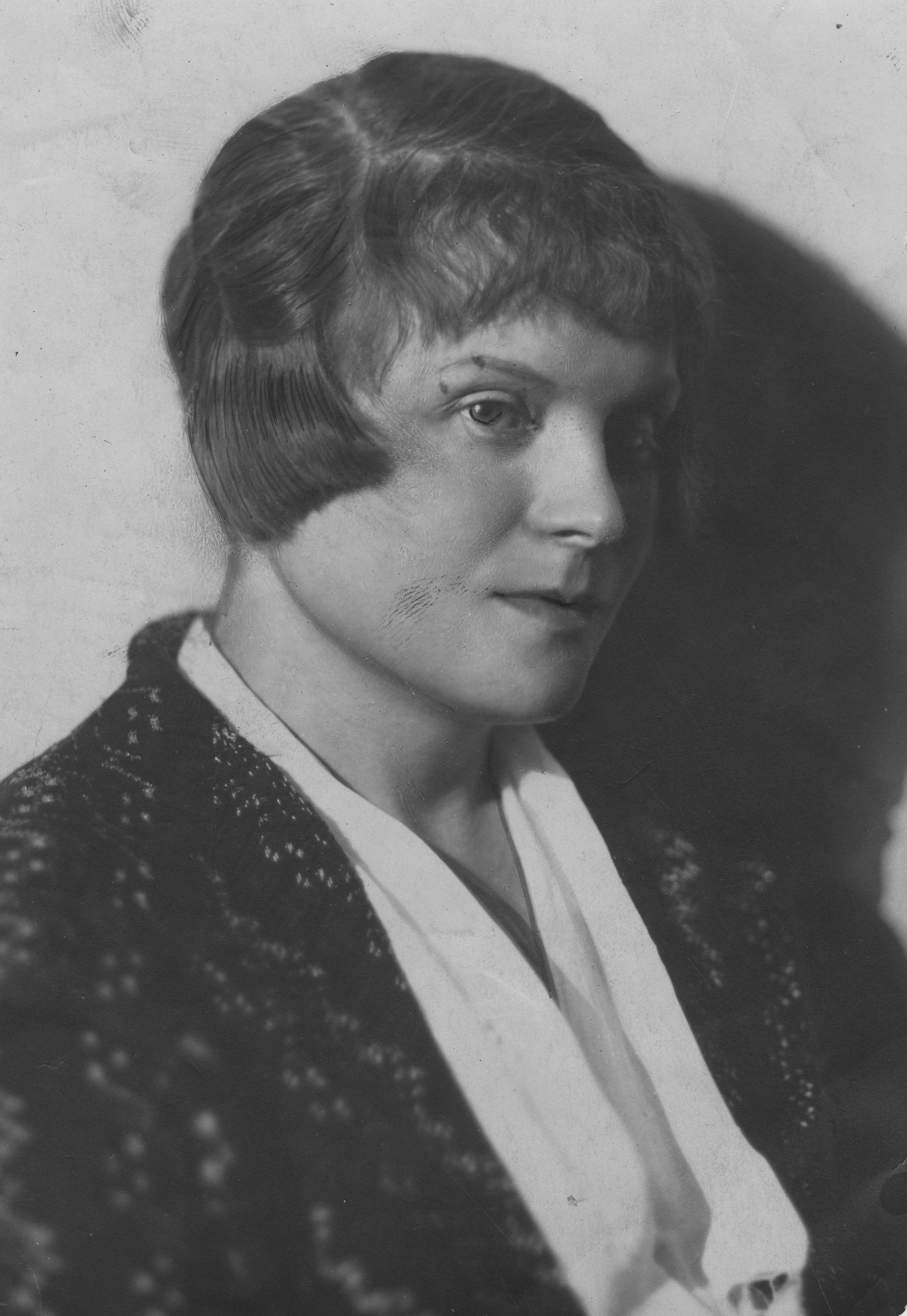
- Born: Maria Szumska; 6 October 1889; Russów, Congress Poland, Russian Empire (now Poland)
- Died: 19 May 1965 (aged 75); Warsaw, Poland
- Resting place: Powązki Cemetery
- Occupations: novelist; short story author; journalist; essayist; playwright
- Writing career
- Language: Polish
- Notable works: Noce i dnie (Nights and Days)

Maria Dąbrowska ([dɔmˈbrɔfska]; born Maria Szumska; 6 October 1889 – 19 May 1965) was a Polish writer, novelist, essayist, journalist and playwright, author of the popular Polish historical novel Noce i dnie (Nights and Days) written between 1932 and 1934 in four separate volumes. The novel was made into a film by the same title in 1975 by Jerzy Antczak. Besides her own work, she was also known for translating Samuel Pepys' Diary into Polish. In addition, Dąbrowska was awarded the Golden Laurel of the Polish Academy of Literature in 1935, and she was nominated for the Nobel Prize in Literature eleven times between 1939 and 1965.

== Biography ==
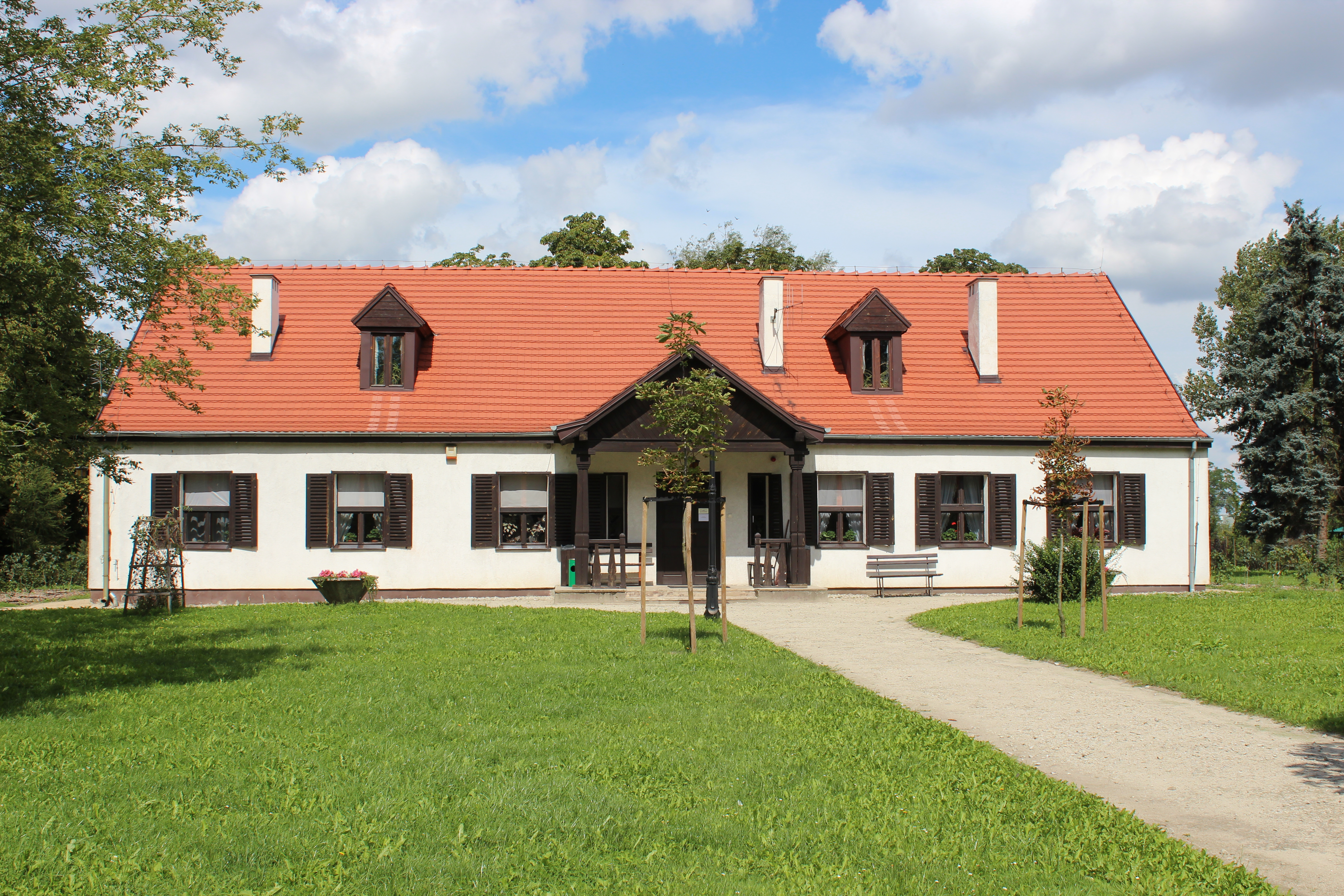
Family manor in Russów, where Dąbrowska was raised

Dąbrowska was born Maria Szumska in Russów near Kalisz, Congress Poland, under Tsarist military control. Her parents belonged to the impoverished landed gentry (ziemiaństwo). Maria suffered from esotropia, giving her a "cross-eyed" appearance. She studied sociology, philosophy, and natural sciences in Lausanne and Brussels, and settled in Warsaw in 1917. Interested in both literature and politics, she devoted herself to help those born into poverty. In the interwar period, Dąbrowska worked temporarily in the Polish Ministry of Agriculture while venturing more and more into newspaper reporting and public life. In 1927 she became more involved in writing about human rights. In her novels, plays and newspaper articles she analyzed the psychological consequences of hardship and life's traumas in the world of ordinary people.

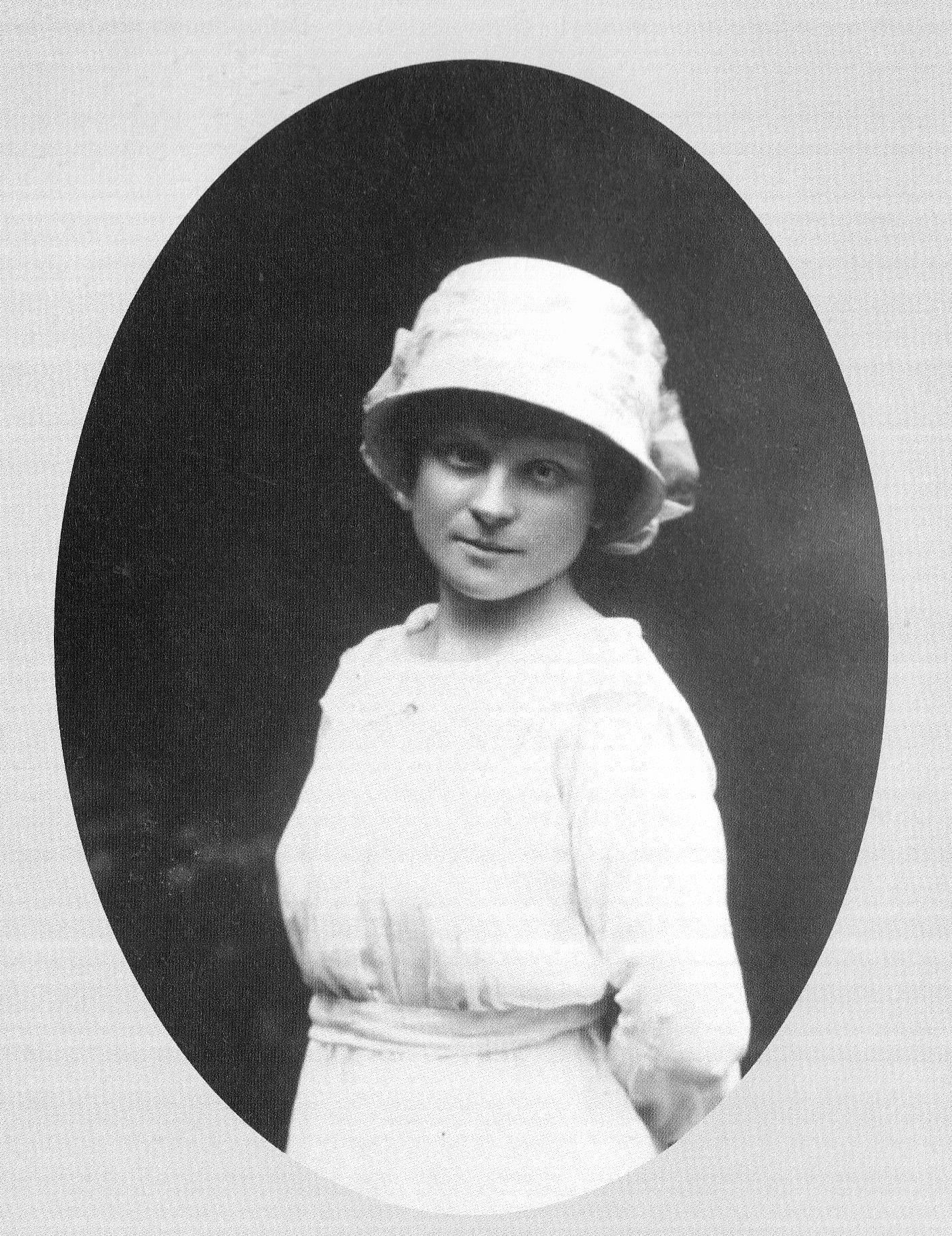
Dąbrowska in 1914

Maria married Marian Dąbrowski, who died suddenly when she was 36. Her second long-term partner was the 19-years-older Stanisław Stempowski, with whom she lived in a common-law marriage until the outbreak of World War II. After these relationships, she started becoming more and more independent, and even once said that Dąbrowski and Stempowski were more like her universities, and less like romantic relationships. During the occupation of Poland, she stayed in Warsaw and supported the cultural life of the Polish underground. At about that time, she met Anna Kowalska and Jerzy Kowalski, a literary couple. They formed a ménage à trois, and Maria had a child by Jerzy in 1946, but he died suddenly in 1948. The two women stayed together in a relationship for the next 20 years, although Maria tried to get Anna married off again. Dąbrowska was awarded the Order of Polonia Restituta during the Stalinist period. In 1964 she was one of the signatories of the so-called Letter of 34 to Prime Minister Józef Cyrankiewicz, regarding freedom of culture. She died on 19 May 1965, at the age of 75, at a clinic in Warsaw.

== Education ==
Dąbrowska's parents, Josef Szumski and Ludomira (née Galczynska) wanted her to receive a thorough education, and sent her to private schools for much of her early life. In 1901, she was sent to a boarding school at the private school of Mrs. Sedemani in Kalisz, which she attended in 1904. Then, in 1905, she attended the private boarding school of Miss Havelke in Warsaw. Here is where she received a lot of her education in literature from Ignacy Chrzanowski. She attended Miss Havelke's school until 1908. Then, from 1908 to 1909, she began studying natural science at a university in Lausanne, Switzerland. She later completed her studies at the University of Brussels in 1912, earning a degree of natural science, or candidat ès sciences naturelles.

== Politics ==
When Dąbrowska first met her husband Marian Dąbrowski, he was a political refugee and an active member of the Polish Socialist Party. This, along with rising tensions in Poland during her formative years, launched her into activism herself. One example of this is through two protest articles she wrote for Wiadomosci Literackie Nos. 3 & 4 in 1931: "Rozmova z przyjaciolmi" ("A Talk with Friends") & "Na ciezkiej drodze" ("On a Difficult Road"). These articles spoke out against the holding of the leaders of an initiative that opposed Polish government. These leaders were being held in the fortress of Brzesc under Józef Piłsudski's rule. Dąbrowska thought that this was unjust, and she aimed to contribute to the opposition through her articles. Another example of her activism was in another protest article she wrote in 1936 in Dziennik Popularny No. 43. This article was titled "Doroczny wstyd" ("The Yearly Disgrace"), and it spoke out against antisemitism in Polish universities and against the overpowered government.

Despite her activism, Dąbrowska did not explicitly identify with a political party. She once wrote in her diary, "I have no ideology. The only thing directing me is my love of people and life, and compassion."

== Writing style ==
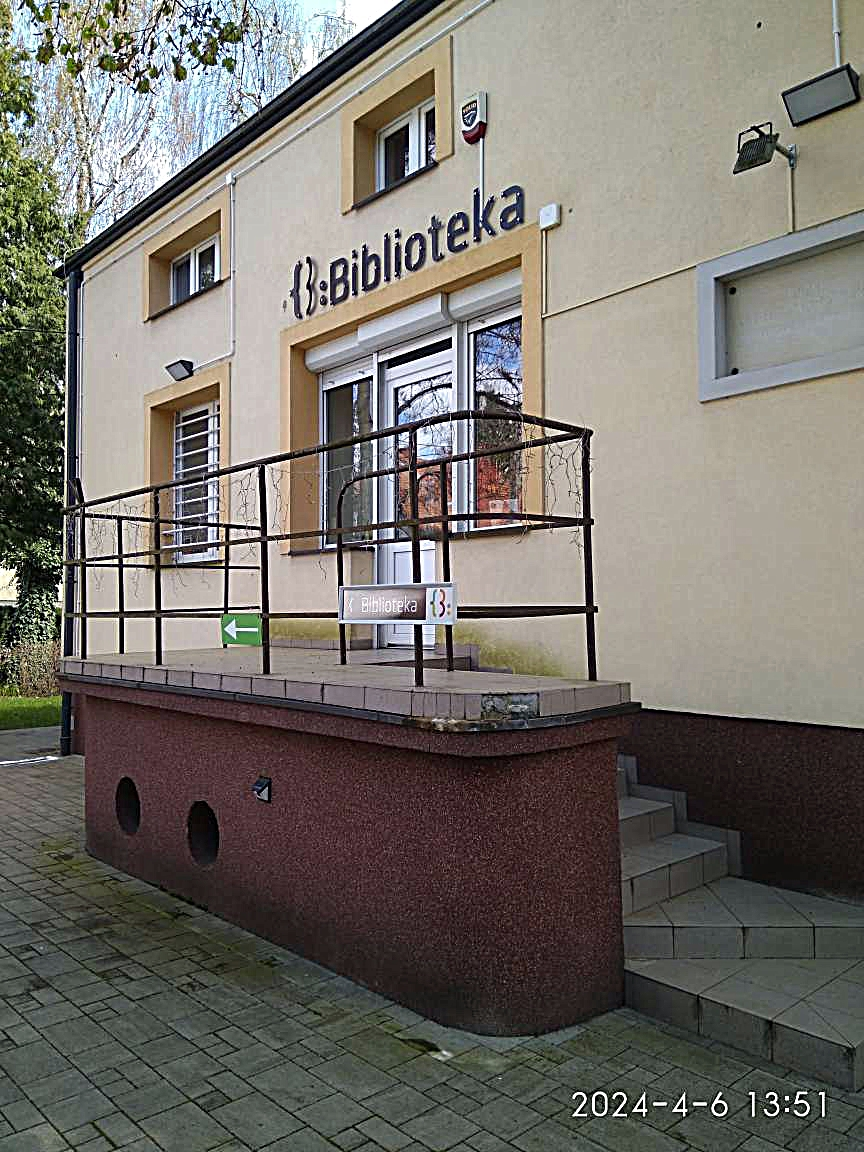
Maria Dąbrowska property at Komorów by Warsaw, Poland, 6 April 2024

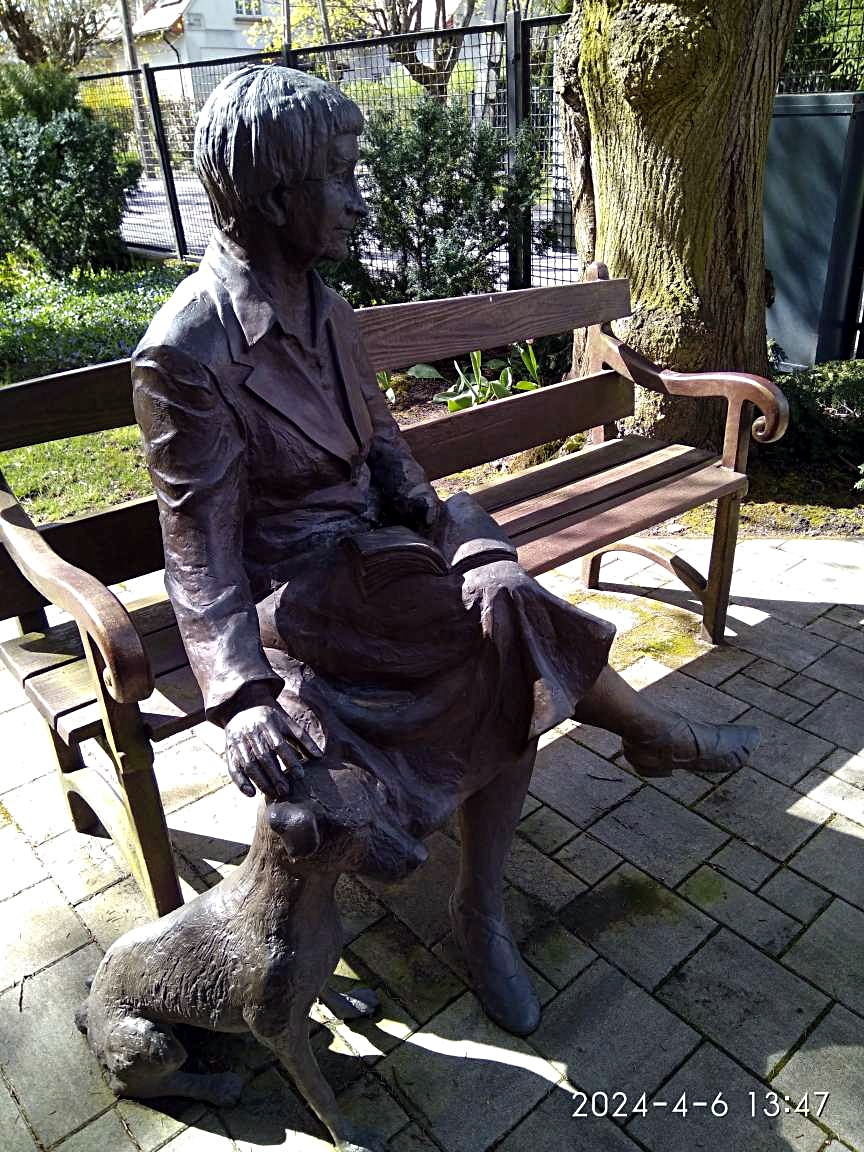
Maria Dąbrowska sitting, sculpture at her property, Komorów by Warsaw, 6 April 2024

Dąbrowska was known for having a very socially aware voice that seemed to be dependent on her surrounding world. This gave her a very mature and extroverted point of view. At the time she first started writing, there was a huge amount of historical events that were happening, since it was around the time of World War I. Historical events shaped her writing to the point that, sometimes, her writing was less about creativity and more about conveying information in a concise way (especially in her diaries). Then, as she continued writing, she also experienced World War II first hand, which was especially dangerous in Poland. Her works reflected these experiences. She would write about the journeys of underprivileged, homeless, and landless protagonists; she would paint the picture of their lives authentically and with compassion.

In addition, Dąbrowska wrote a novel – that was not published until after her death – that used a particular device. In Przygody człowieka myślącego (Adventures of a Thinking Man), she transposed her own life experiences onto two characters: Ewa Radgoska and Józef Tomyski. Notably, Józef was a male character. This is a technique that many queer female authors of the early twentieth century used; they would transpose their lives onto male characters in a way to make their lives more digestible to readers at the time.

== Works ==
- "Janek" ("Little John"), 1914, short story
  - published in Prawda, No. 23 (the Warsaw weekly)
- Dzieci ojczyzny (Fatherland's Children), 1918, short stories
- Gałąź czereśni (The Cherry Branch), 1922, short stories
- Uśmiech dzieciństwa (The Smile of Childhood), 1923, short stories
- Ludzie stamtąd (People from Yonder), 1926, short stories
- Marcin Kozera, 1927, short stories
- Dzikie ziele, 1925–1929, short stories
- "Rozmova z przyjaciolmi" ("A Talk with Friends") & "Na ciezkiej drodze" ("On a Difficult Road"), 1931, protest articles
  - published in Wiadomosci Literackie Nos. 3 & 4
- Noce i dnie (Nights and Days), 1932–1934, tetralogy of novels – English translation fragment
- "Doroczny wstyd" ("The Yearly Disgrace"), 1936, protest article
  - published in Dziennik Popularny No. 43
- Znaki życia (Signs of Life), 1938, short stories
- Geniusz sierocy (The Orphan Genius), 1939, drama
- Stanisław i Bogumił (Stanislaw and Bogumil), 1948, historical play
- Gwiazda zaranna (The Morning Star), 1955, short stories
  - included Pielgrzymka do Warszawy (Pilgrimage to Warsaw)
- Szkice o Conradzie (Essays on Conrad), 1959, essays
- Dzienniki (Journals), 1914–1965, diaries
- Przygody człowieka myślącego (Adventures of a Thinking Man), 1970, novel
  - published after her death, written sometime throughout the span of her diaries

== Awards and decorations ==
- Order of the Banner of Labour, 1st Class (1959)
- Commander's Cross with Star of Order of Polonia Restituta (15 July 1954)
- Cross of Independence (16 March 1963)
- Officer's Cross of Order of Polonia Restituta (1 October 1952)
- Golden Cross of Merit (three times, 11 listopada 1934, 15 czerwca 1946, 17 września 1946)
- Golden Academic Laurel (5 November 1935)
- Medal of the 10th Anniversary of People's Poland (19 January 1955)

== See also ==
- Polish literature
