= Adolf Rudnicki =

Polish author and essayist (1912–1990)

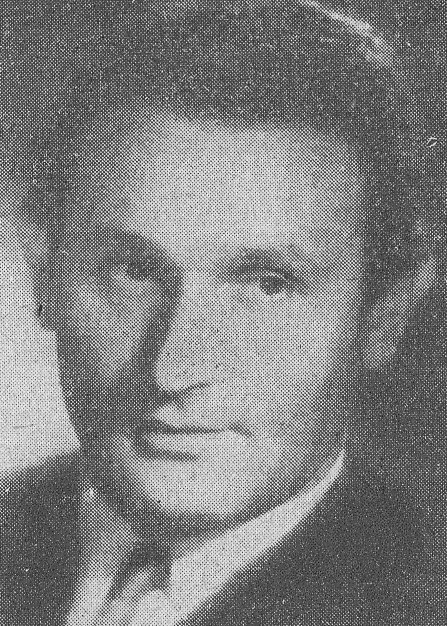
Adolf Rudnicki in 1950.

Adolf Rudnicki, born Aron Hirschhorn (February 19, 1912, Żabno − November 14, 1990, Warsaw) was a Polish author and essayist, best known for his works about The Holocaust and the Jewish resistance in Poland during World War II.

== Biography ==
He was born to a Hasidic Jewish family. After attended a trade school, he worked as a bank clerk. His writing career began in 1930 when he published his short novel Death of the Operator in the current events journal Kurier Poranny. He first gained popularity in Poland with his 1930s novels The Unloved and The Rats.

He was captured by the Nazis during the invasion of Poland, but managed to escape. After a brief period of service in the Polish Army, he went to Lwów and joined the National Jewish Committee. Around 1942, he returned to Warsaw and was active in the underground. After the war, he published the novels The Golden Windows and The Merchant of Lodz, and the short story collection Epoch of the Ovens, all concerning the Holocaust and the Jewish resistance. The widely used term "epoka pieców" (Age of the Stoves) comes from one of his works.

After 1953, he began writing essays on a wide range of topics which were ultimately collected in a series of volumes called the Blue Pages. During the 1960s, his works took on a mystical tone. In 1964 he was one of the signatories of the so-called Letter of 34 to Prime Minister Józef Cyrankiewicz regarding freedom of culture. He spent most of the 1970s in Paris, where he was married and had a son. He returned to Poland, largely forgotten, in the 1980s and lived in Warsaw until his death.

His story The Unloved was made into the film Niekochana (1966).
