= No. 4 Street of Our Lady =

2009 film

No. 4 Street of Our Lady is a 2009 documentary film about Franciszka Halamajowa, a Polish woman of Catholic faith, and her daughter Helena, who risked their life to save three Jewish families, 15 persons, during the Holocaust.

In 1984, Yad Vashem recognized Franciszka Halamajowa and Helena Liniewska-Halamajowa, as Righteous Among the Nations.

== Synopsis ==
On the eve of World War II, roughly 6,000 Jews lived in Sokal, a small town on the Bug River located in a region known as Eastern Galicia. She hid two families in the hayloft of her pigsty for close to two years, and another family in a hole dug under her kitchen floor. Toward the end of the war, she also sheltered a German soldier who had defected from the army.

== Release and reception ==
Directed by Barbara Bird, Judy Maltz and Richie Sherman, the film has been screened at dozens of film festivals around the world and broadcast on television in the United States, Israel and Poland. Among other accolades, It was the recipient of a Cine Golden Eagle Award, a Silver Telly Award the grand prize for Best Documentary Film at the Rhode Island International Film Festival in 2009 and Best Documentary at the Detroit Jewish Film Festival in 2010. Writing in The Jewish Week, film critic George Robinson called it a "Holocaust documentary with a subtle but very real difference, its structure combining the present with memory in a way that most such films cannot."

== Production ==
Many of the details of this rescue story were contained in a diary kept by one of the survivors, the late Moshe Maltz, whose granddaughter produced the film. The diary was translated into English and self-published in 1993. Shot largely on location in Sokal, the film also incorporates testimonies from other survivors, the descendants of the rescuer and local townspeople. Following the release of the film, the Anti-Defamation League post-humously honored Halamajowa with its "Courage to Care" award.

== Controversy ==
In March 2013, a Canadian money manager, J.L. Witterick, (also known as Jenny Witterick and Jennifer Witterick) published a book, "My Mother's Secret," which she said was inspired by the film. The book was originally self-published by iUniverse, but after entering the Globe and Mail bestseller list, it was picked up by the international Penguin group. In February 2014, the filmmakers filed a suit in the Canadian Federal Court against her and her publisher, Penguin Canada, for copyright and moral rights infringement. The suit lists 30 instances of copying or near copying from the film in the book.

On May 10, 2016, Judge Keith Boswell of the Canadian Federal Court ruled in favor of the respondents and said that the copyright of the filmmakers had not been infringed because the story told in the film was "common historical fact." He ordered the applicants to pay the respondents' costs. The judge dismissed an argument by Jack Granatstein, a Canadian historian who served as an expert witness for the applicants. Granatstein had argued that a distinction needs to be drawn between big and little facts when it comes to copyright protection. Little facts, like those included in the film, he said, deserved copyright protection. By contrast, the judge relied in his ruling on an affidavit submitted by Sara Horowitz, a professor of comparative literature at York University hired by J.L. Witterick and Penguin. In her affidavit, Horowitz suggested that there was nothing unique about the story told in "No. 4 Street of Our Lady."

Reporting on the ruling, Kate Taylor of The Globe and Mail wrote: "Whatever you think of Witterick’s fast-track approach to publishing – you could call it derivative, or impolite – it does not infringe Maltz’s copyright, according to a court decision this week."
