= Russów =

- Village
- Location within Poland
- Coordinates: 51°51′N 18°5′E
- Country: Poland
- Voivodeship: Greater Poland
- County: Kalisz
- Gmina: Żelazków

Russów [ˈrussuf] is a village in the administrative district of Gmina Żelazków, within Kalisz County, Greater Poland Voivodeship, in west-central Poland.

== Notable people ==
Russów is the birthplace of writer Maria Dąbrowska (1889–1965), the author of a popular Polish historical novel Noce i dnie (Nights and Days) written between 1932 and 1934. It was made into a film by the same title in 1975 by Jerzy Antczak. Her family belonged to local landed gentry (Ziemiaństwo).
