= Władysław Kopaliński =

Polish lexicographer (1907–2007)

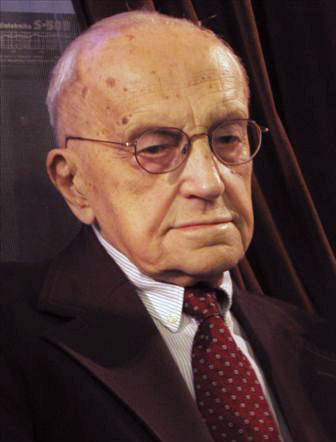
Władysław Kopaliński in Warsaw in 2006

Władysław Kopaliński (real name Władysław Jan Stefczyk; November 14, 1907 – October 5, 2007) was a Polish lexicographer, publisher, writer and translator. He was a prolific author and winner of numerous awards for his work.

== Life ==
He was born in Warsaw as Jan Sterling, a son of Jewish parents Stanisław Sterling and Regina Willer.

Kopaliński was a renowned lexicographer and contributed much to modern knowledge of the origins of the Polish language. He was considered an authority on the origins of Polish words, leading to a common expression, "Look it up in Kopaliński." His Polish dictionaries include Dictionary of Myths and Cultural Traditions and the Dictionary of Symbols. His most famous work was the Dictionary of Words and Phrases of Foreign Origin. An unabridged version of the latter dictionary has been published on the Internet.

Kopaliński also authored several books which are not dictionaries, including 125 Fairy Stories To Tell the Children, Lexicon of Love Themes, and the Book of Quotations from Polish Belles-Lettres.

Kopaliński was a member of the Polish Writers' Society. He also wrote a regular column in Życie Warszawy, ran a Polish radio station, and translated English-language books into Polish.

Kopaliński died in Warsaw on October 5, 2007 at the age of 99.

== See also ==
- List of Poles
