= Edward Lipiński (economist) =

Polish economist, intellectual, and human rights activist (1888–1986)

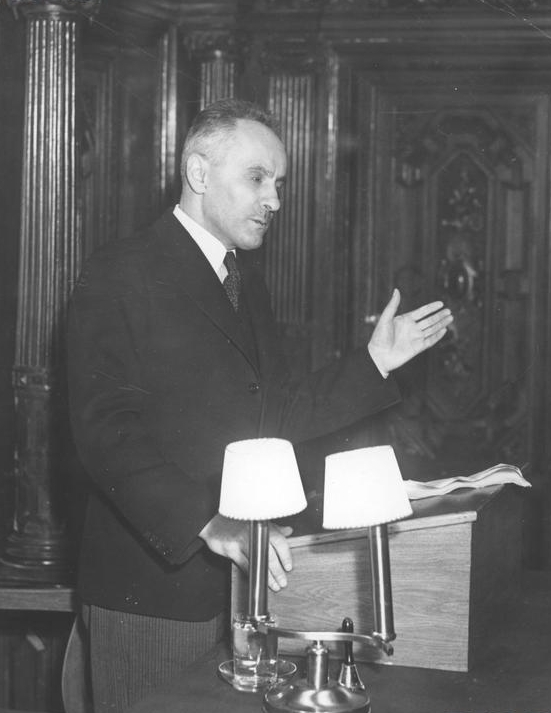
- Born: 18 October 1888; Nowe Miasto nad Pilicą
- Died: 13 July 1986; Warsaw
- Occupations: Economist, politician, university teacher
- Employer: SGH Warsaw School of Economics (1923–1962)

Edward Lipiński (October 18, 1888 – July 13, 1986) was a Polish economist, intellectual, social critic and human rights advocate. During the almost seven decades of his career, he held a series of academic and government advisory positions, founded several organizations, published books and essays on economic policy. His works concerned business cycles, growth theory, history of economic thought and other areas of economics. Lipiński was a fighter for Polish independence and a socialist activist in the Second Polish Republic. In the Polish People's Republic, Lipiński was an influential Marxian economist and a long-term member of the communist party. Outspoken in his criticism of government policies, he became active in opposition circles.

== Life, career and social activism ==
Lipiński was born at Nowe Miasto, Congress Poland in the Russian Empire. He was briefly jailed in 1906 for protesting Tsarist rule in Poland. Educated in Leipzig from 1909 to 1912, he obtained a doctorate in economics from the University of Zurich prior to World War I. After World War I, in early independent Poland, he participated in the Polish–Soviet War.

He organized and directed the Institute of Prices and Business Cycles in 1928. From 1929, he was professor in the Warsaw School of Economics. He founded the Central Statistical Office and the Polish Economic Association. He also served as president of the Economic Association (1945–65), was editor of the periodical Ekonomista ('The Economist'), and a member of the Polish Academy of Sciences. Being Poland's foremost economist, Lipiński was also a notable author whose works are widely read in his native Poland, though many have not yet been translated into English. In 1938, he actively opposed the antisemitic campaign carried out at institutions of higher learning by Polish nationalistic factions and supported by the Camp of National Unity party, which forced him to resign from his position at the School of Economics. During the occupation of Poland in World War II, Professor Lipiński held underground classes.

After the war, he was briefly the chair of economics at the University of Warsaw and became one of the economic advisors to the Polish government.

Lipiński was a member of the Polish Socialist Party (PPS-Lewica) since 1906. In 1948, when the PPS was merged with the communist Polish Workers' Party, he became a member of the new communist Polish United Workers' Party (PZPR).

Throughout his postwar career, he frequently clashed with communist government economists regarding their inflexibility in applying Karl Marx's economic principles. An outspoken critic of Stalinism, Lipinski warned that "over-organization" of economic policy and rigid adherence to the party line, even in the face of rapidly changing conditions that required immediate action beyond the scope of the routine, would stifle growth. Because of his criticism, when the hard line Stalinist faction of Bolesław Bierut gained power in 1949, Lipiński was forced to resign as chair of economics at the university and banned from delivering some of his lectures.

After the Polish October of 1956, Lipiński briefly returned as an economic advisor, but when the new government lost its zeal to reform, he became sidelined again. His candidature was one of many that were put forward by the people, but discarded by the government screening commission in the Polish legislative election in 1957.

Lipiński became one of the prominent critics of the government. His position as a known Marxist economist shielded him to certain extent from government persecution and allowed him to say things many others were unable to. Till the very end he remained convinced that some form of socialism is preferable to capitalism. He signed three public letters criticizing the communist government: the Letter of 34 in 1964, the Letter of 59 in 1975 and the Letter of 14 in 1976. In 1977 he was expelled from the PZPR.

In the spring of 1976, Lipiński sent an open letter to First Secretary Edward Gierek of the PZPR, criticizing the drastic price increase on foodstuffs that Gierek imposed in an attempt to balance Poland's import-based economy that relied heavily on Western loans. Gierek, who came to power after the overthrow of Władysław Gomułka, promised to improve the quality of life of Polish workers by raising wages and stabilizing prices. In his letter Lipiński wrote "Socialism cannot be decreed. It is and may only be born of free actions of free people" and pledged that "the movement of revival shall gain strength and the recently intensified repression will not contain it for much longer…" Lipinski's letter came at the time of renewal of massive strikes and riots in Poland.

The letter also coincided with the formation of the Workers' Defence Committee, which marked the beginning of successful cooperation of workers and intellectuals. Also known as the KOR, this group founded by Edward Lipiński, Stanisław Barańczak, Jan Józef Lipski and others gave assistance to worker protest participants jailed after the widespread strikes. Lipiński was one of the elder distinguished members of the organization, whose presence added a degree of protection from the authorities. The assistance provided by the KOR and the continual activities of its members helped, after another wave of strikes, make the Gdańsk Agreement of 1980 possible. On 23 September 1981, Lipiński gave a speech to Solidarity independent trade union first national congress, announcing the disbanding of the KOR. He heralded the arrival of Solidarity as a political force, saying "The KOR has recognized that its work has ended, and that other forces have arrived on a much more powerful scale. But the task of fighting for an independent Poland, for human and civil rights, is a fight that still must go on."

== Works ==
Lipiński is the author of nearly 200 books and essays on subjects ranging from the theory of economic fluctuations, a field upon which he wielded a great influence, to industrial performance, prices and planning, market structures, and in his early career, social issues. A great deal of his work was dedicated to socio-economic research. Never relying solely on mathematical models and theory to predict and explain economical phenomena, Lipiński is known for the emphasis on human creativity and spontaneity. In his seminal Karl Marx and Problems of Our Time, Lipiński posits that economics are a "complex social phenomena" and he draws on sociology and psychology to explain trends, as much as he relies on mathematics.

Selected bibliography of texts available in English:

- Studies in the History of Polish Economic Thought (1956)
- Karl Marx and the Problems of Our Time (1969)
- Development of Agriculture and Industry (1955)

== Memberships and positions held ==
- Member Polish Socialist Party
- Member Polish United Workers' Party
- President Bank of Economic Developments
- Minister of the Statistical Office
- Chair of Economics, Higher Academy of International Trade (1930-retirement)
- Chair of Economics, Warsaw University (post World War II)
- Founder and Head of the Institute of Trade Cycles and Prices (1928)
- Director of the Institute of National Economy (1956)
- Editor of The Economist (1928-1978)
- President Polish Academy of Economists
- Founding member Workers' Defense Committee, KOR (1976)
- Solidarity advisor (1981)
