= Czesław Hernas =

Polish philologist and folklorist (1928–2003)

- Born: July 12, 1928; Sokal, Lwów Voivodeship, Second Polish Republic
- Died: December 11, 2003 (aged 75); Wrocław, Lower Silesian Voivodeship, Third Polish Republic
- Resting place: Osobowice Cemetery
- Organization: Collegium Invisibile
- Awards: Order of Polonia Restituta

Czesław Hernas (July 12, 1928 – December 11, 2003) was a Polish philologist, folklorist and professor at the University of Wrocław.

Hernas was Director of the Institute of Polish Philology (1971–1885) and a member of the Wroclaw Citizen's Committee of Solidarity (1989–1990).

Hernas was born in Sokal and died in Wrocław.

== Books ==
- Barok. PWN 1972
- Literatura baroku. PWN 1985
- Polnischer Barock. Surkamp Verlag, Frankfurt am Main 1991
- Polska XVII wieku red. J. Tazbir, Wiedza powszechna, Warszawa 1977 (author of section Zarys rozwoju literatury barokowej)
- Hejnały polskie, Studia staropolskie, 1961
- W kalinowym lesie, volumes 1, 2, PIW 1965

== Awards ==
- 2001: Commander's Cross of the Order of Polonia Restituta
- 1991: Franciszek Kotula Medal (for achievements in ethnography)
