= Jan Szczepański (sociologist) =

Polish sociologist and politician

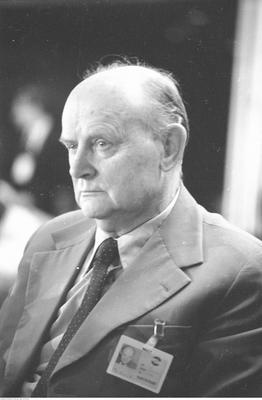

Jan Szczepański (14 September 1913 – 16 April 2004) was a Polish sociologist and politician. Professor of University of Łódź, its rector from 1952 to 1956. His works concentrated on theory of sociology, history of sociology, as well as studying of transformations of social structure.

He was a politician in People's Republic of Poland, deputy to Sejm and member of the Polish Council of State from 1977 to 1982. He was a member of the Polish Academy of Sciences. Szczepański retired in 1982.

He was the sixth president of the International Sociological Association (1966–1970).

== Biography ==
Szczepanski was born in Ustroń, in Cieszyn Silesia. He studied and received his doctorate at the University of Poznan, where he was a senior assistant to Florian Znaniecki. From 1945 to 1970 he worked at the University of Lodz. In 1951 he became a full professor there, and from 1952 to 1956 he was the rector.

== See also ==
- Piotr Sztompka
