= Antonia Lloyd-Jones =

British translator

Antonia Lloyd-Jones (born 1962) is a British translator of Polish literature based in London.

She is best known as the long-time translator of Olga Tokarczuk's works into English, including Drive Your Plow Over the Bones of the Dead, which was shortlisted for the International Booker Prize in 2019.

The former co-chair of the Translators Association in the United Kingdom from 2015 to 2017, she is also a mentor for the Emerging Translator Mentorship Programme in the National Centre for Writing and has mentored several early-career translators from Polish into English.

== Biography ==
Antonia Lloyd-Jones graduated from Oxford after studying Russian and Ancient Greek. After first travelling to Wrocław in 1983 during the period of martial law to visit friends who had been involved in protests, Lloyd-Jones intended to report on the social unrest as a journalist and began learning Polish. While working as the editor of the Polish-language magazine Brytania published by the Central Office of Information, she met author Paweł Huelle at an arts festival in Glasgow after the publication of his first novel in 1987, Weiser Dawidek. The English translation, Who Was David Weiser?, was published by Bloomsbury in 1991. Since 1991, she has published numerous works by Polish novelists, journalists, essayists, poets, and children's authors. She began translating from Polish full time in 2001.

Lloyd-Jones has frequently discussed the challenges of finding publishers willing to take the financial risk of publishing Polish and other "minor" languages compared to more mainstream languages, such as French or Spanish, and lauded the works of small, independent publishers, such as Open Letter Books, that take an interest in "commercially unviable" literature.

Lloyd-Jones was announced as the translator in one of the two initial acquisitions of Linden Editions, a new publishing house based in London founded by the Turkish literary agent Nermin Mollaoğlu.

== Translations ==
=== Fiction ===
- Constantine, Helen, ed. (2022). Warsaw Tales. Oxford: Oxford university press. ISBN 9780192855565.
- Dehnel, Jacek (2012). Saturn. Sawtry: Dedalus Books. ISBN 9781907650697.
- Dehnel, Jacek (2019). Lala. London: OneWorld. ISBN 9781786074980.
- Gombrowicz, Witold (2023). The Possessed. London: Fitzcarraldo Editions. ISBN 9781804270615.
- Huelle, Paweł (1991). Who was David Weiser?. London: Bloomsbury. ISBN 9780747508823.
- Huelle, Paweł (1996). Moving House and Other Stories. London: Bloomsbury. ISBN 9780156002516.
- Huelle, Paweł (2005). Mercedes-Benz: From Letters to Hrabal. London: Serpent's Tale. ISBN 9781852428693.
- Huelle, Paweł (2007). Castorp. London: Serpent's Tale. ISBN 9781852429454.
- Huelle, Paweł (2008). The Last Supper. London: Serpent's Tale. ISBN 9781852429805.
- Huelle, Paweł (2012). Cold Sea Stories. Manchester: Comma Press. ISBN 9781905583393.
- Iwaszkiewicz, Jarosław (2002). The Birch Grove and Other Stories. Budapest; New York: Central European University Press. ISBN 9789639241459.
- Lem, Stanisław (2020). "Professor A. Dońda" in Memoirs of a Space Traveler: Further Reminiscences of Ijon Tichy. Cambridge, Massachusetts: The MIT Press. ISBN 9780262538503.
- Lem, Stanisław (2021). The Truth and Other Stories. Cambridge, Massachusetts: The MIT Press. ISBN 9780262046084.
- Łozinski, Mikołaj (2025). My Name is Stramer. London: Pushkin Press. ISBN 9781805332138.
- Miłoszewski, Zygmunt (2010). Entanglement. London: Bitter Lemon. ISBN 9781904738442.
- Miłoszewski, Zygmunt (2012). A Grain of Truth. London: Bitter Lemon. ISBN 9781908524027.
- Miłoszewski, Zygmunt (2016). Rage. Seattle: Amazon Crossing. ISBN 9781503935860.
- Miłoszewski, Zygmunt (2018). Priceless. Seattle: Amazon Crossing. ISBN 9781503941434.
- Rudzka, Zyta (2024). Doctor Josef's Little Beauty. New York: Seven Stories. ISBN 9781644213759.
- Słoniowska, Żanna (2017). The House with the Stained-Glass Window. London: MacLehose. ISBN 9780857057136.
- Szymiczkowa, Maryla (2020). Mrs. Mohr Goes Missing. Boston: Mariner Books. ISBN 9780358274247.
- Szymiczkowa, Maryla (2021). Karolina and the Torn Curtain. Boston: Mariner Books. ISBN 9780358157571.
- Tokarczuk, Olga (2002). House of Day, House of Night. London: Granta Books. ISBN 9781862075146.
- Tokarczuk, Olga (2009). Primeval and Other Times. Prague: Twisted Spoon. ISBN 9788086264356.
- Tokarczuk, Olga (2019). Drive Your Plow Over the Bones of the Dead. New York: Riverhead Books. ISBN 9780525541332.
- Tokarczuk, Olga (2021). The Lost Soul. New York: Seven Stories Press. ISBN 9781644210345.
- Tokarczuk, Olga (2024). The Empusium. New York: Riverhead. ISBN 9780593712948.
- Wawszczyk, Wojtek (2022). Mr Lightbulb. Seattle: Fantagraphics. ISBN 9781683965244.
- Płaza, Maciej (2026). Golem. Pushkin Press. ISBN 9781805332169.

=== Poetry ===
- Dąbrowski, Tadeusz (2011). Black Square: Selected Poems. Brookline, MA: Zephyr Press. ISBN 9780981552163.
- Dąbrowski, Tadeusz (2018). Post. Brookline, MA: Zephyr Press. ISBN 9781938890994.
- Dąbrowska, Krystyna (2022). Tideline. Translated by Kovacik, Karen; Lloyd-Jones, Antonia; Rosenthal, Mira. Brookline, MA: Zephyr Press. ISBN 9781938890888.

=== Nonfiction ===
- Czapski, Józef (2018). Inhuman Land: A Wartime Journey through the USSR. New York: New York Review of Books. ISBN 9781681372563.
- Domosławski, Artur (2012). Ryszard Kapuściński. London: Verso. ISBN 9781844678587.
- Hugo-Bader, Jacek (2012). White Fever: A Journey to the Frozen Heart of Siberia. London: Granta Books. ISBN 9781846272707.
- Hugo-Bader, Jacek (2017). Kolyma Diaries: A Journey into Russia's Haunted Hinterland. London: Portobello Books. ISBN 9781846275029.
- Jagielski, Wojciech (2012). The Night Wanderers: Uganda's Children and the Lord's Resistance Army. New York: Seven Stories Press. ISBN 9781609803506.
- Jagielski, Wojciech (2015). Burning the Grass: At the Heart of Change in South Africa, 1990-2011. New York: Seven Stories Press. ISBN 9781609806477.
- Jagielski, Wojciech (2020). All Lara's War. New York: Seven Stories Press. ISBN 9781644210161.
- Kapuściński, Ryszard (2018). The Other. London: Verso. ISBN 9781786635969.
- Kizny, Tomasz (2004). Gulag. Buffalo, NY: Firefly. ISBN 9781552979648.
- Olczak-Ronikier, Joanna (2004). In the Garden of Memory : a Family Memoir. London: Weidenfeld and Nicolson. ISBN 9780297645498.
- Rejmer, Margo (2021). Mud Sweeter Than Honey: Voices of Communist Albania. London: MacLehose Press. ISBN 9781529411461. (co-translated with Zosia Krasodomska-Jones)
- Rudolf, Anthony (2016). Jerzyk : Diaries, Texts and Testimonies of the Urman Family. Exeter: Shearsman Books. ISBN 9781848613690.
- Szabłowski, Witold (2013). The Assassin from Apricot City: Reportage from Turkey. London: Stork Press. ISBN 9780957391253.
- Szabłowski, Witold (2018). Dancing Bears. New York: Penguin Books. ISBN 9780143129745.
- Szabłowski, Witold (2020). How to Feed a Dictator: Saddam Hussein, Idi Amin, Enver Hoxha, Fidel Castro, and Pol Pot Through the Eyes of Their Cooks. New York: Penguin Books. ISBN 9780143129752.
- Szczeklik, Andrzej (2005). Catharsis: On the Art of Medicine. Chicago: University of Chicago Press. ISBN 0226788695.
- Szczeklik, Andrzej (2012). Kore: On Sickness, the Sick, and the Search for the Soul of Medicine. Berkeley: Counterpoint. ISBN 9781619020191.
- Szczygieł, Mariusz (2014). Gottland. Brooklyn: Melville House. ISBN 9781612193137.
- Tochman, Wojciech (2009). Like Eating a Stone: Surviving the Past in Bosnia. London: Portobello. ISBN 9781846270888.
- Wittlin, Józef; Sands, Philippe (2016). City of Lions. London: Pushkin Press. ISBN 9781782271178.
- Szabłowski, Witold (2023). What's Cooking in the Kremlin?. New York: Penguin Books. ISBN 9780143137184.

=== Children's fiction ===
- Boglar, Krystyna (2017). Clementine Loves Red. London: Pushkin Children's Books. ISBN 9788373185289. (co-translated with Zosia Krasodomska-Jones)
- Korczak, Janusz (2012). Kaytek the Wizard. New York: Penlight. ISBN 9780983868507.
- Małkowski, Tomasz (2022). The Boy Who Sees with His Fingers. Milan: MIMebu. ISBN 9788869773389.
- Mizielińska, Aleksandra; Mizieliński, Daniel (2013). Maps. London: Big Picture Press. ISBN 9781848773011.
- Mizielińska, Aleksandra; Mizieliński, Daniel (2016). Under Earth, Under Water. London: Big Picture Press. ISBN 9781783703647.
- Mizielińska, Aleksandra; Mizieliński, Daniel (2017). Maps Special Edition. London: Big Picture Press. ISBN 9781783708048.
- Mizielińska, Aleksandra; Mizieliński, Daniel (2020). Maps Deluxe Edition. London: Big Picture Press. ISBN 9781787417199.
- Oziewicz, Tina (2024). What Feelings Like Best. London: Pushkin Press. ISBN 9781782694519.
- Pawlak, Pawel (2019). Oscar Seeks a Friend. London: Lantana Publishing. ISBN 9781911373797.
- Rusinek, Michał (2012). Little Chopin. Warsaw: Fryderyk Chopin Institute. ISBN 9788324011087.
- Rusinek, Michał (2014). 1989: A Small Book About a Curtain, About Chocolate, and About Freedom. Warsaw: Chancellery of the President of the Republic of Poland. ISBN 9788364626098.
- Rusinek, Michał (2015). The Presidential Palace for Children. Warsaw: Chancellery of the President of the Republic of Poland. ISBN 9788364626043.
- Tuwim, Julian (2014). Mr Miniscule and the Whale. Bristol: Book Island. ISBN 9780987669681.
- Wechterowicz, Przemyslaw (2017). The Secret Life of a Tiger. London: The Quarto Group. ISBN 9781910277812.
- Wilkoń, Józef (2014). Little Kitty Miaow Miaow. Warsaw: Hokus-Pokus. ISBN 9788360402634.

== Awards ==
- Found in Translation Award 2009 for The Last Supper by Paweł Huelle.
- Found in Translation Award 2013 for seven works published in 2012.
- ZAiKS prize for translation into English, 2017.
- Transatlantyk Prize for the best promoter of Polish literature abroad, 2018.
- Silver Medal for Merit to Culture – Gloria Artis awarded by the Polish Ministry of Culture for contribution to culture, 2019.
