= Beata Pawlak Award =

Beata Pawlak Memorial Award
- Awarded for: best books written in Polish dealing with the topics of religion, culture and society
- Country: Poland
- Presented by: Stefan Batory Foundation
- First award: 2003

The Beata Pawlak Memorial Award (Polish: Nagroda im. Beaty Pawlak) is an annual Polish literary prize founded in 2003 and awarded to authors publishing their works in the Polish language whose subject-matter concerns the themes of religion, culture and civilisation. The award was created to honour the last wish of a Polish award-winning writer and journalist Beata Pawlak who died in the 2002 Bali bombings in Indonesia.

The winner of the award is selected by a jury which has included such members as Adam Szostkiewicz, Wojciech Tochman, Olga Stanisławska, and Wojciech Jagielski.

== Laureates ==
- 2023 - Anna Goc for the book Głusza
- 2022 - Konstanty Gebert for the book Ostateczne rozwiązania. Ludobójcy i ich dzieło
- 2021 - Jagoda Grondecka for articles on Afghanistan published in Krytyka Polityczna and Aleksandra Lipczak for the book Lajla znaczy noc
- 2020 - Agnieszka Pajączkowska for Wędrowny Zakład Fotograficzny ("Wandering Photographic Institute")
- 2019 - Mirosław Wlekły for Raban! O kościele nie z tej ziemi ('Raban! About a Church out of This World")
- 2018 - Ewa Wanat for Deutsche nasz. Reportaże berlińskie ("Our Deutsche. Berlin Reports")
- 2017 - Krzysztof Kopczyński and Anna Sajewicz for Dybuk. Opowieść o nieważności świata ("The Dybbuk: A Tale of the Insignificance of the World")
- 2016 - Jarosław Mikołajewski for Wielki przypływ and Dariusz Rosiak for Ziarno i krew. Podróż śladami bliskowschodnich chrześcijan
- 2015 - Konrad Piskała for Dryland
- 2014 - Mateusz Janiszewski for Dom nad rzeką Loes ("House on the Loes River") and Adam Lach for Stigma
- 2013 - Wojciech Górecki for Abchazja ("Abkhazia")
- 2012 - Bartosz Jastrzębski and Jędrzej Morawiecki for Krasnojarsk Zero
- 2011 - Witold Szabłowski for Zabójca z miasta moreli. Reportaże z Turcji ("The Assassin From the Apricot City. Reportages From Turkey")
- 2010 - Marek Kęskrawiec for Czwarty pożar Teheranu ("The Fourth Fire of Tehran")
- 2009 - Jacek Milewski for Dym się rozwiewa and Max Cegielski for Oko świata. Od Konstantynopola do Stambułu ("The Eye of the World. From Constantinople to Istanbul")
- 2008 - Artur Domosławski for Zbuntowana Ameryka ("Rebellious America") and Cezary Michalski for Listy z Ameryki ("Letters from America")
- 2007 - Mariusz Szczygieł for Gottland
- 2006 - Beata Pawlikowska for Blondynka na Kubie. Na tropach prawdy i Ernesta Che Guevary and Paweł Smoleński for Izrael już nie frunie
- 2005 - Joanna Bator for Japoński wachlarz ("The Japanese Fan")
- 2004 - Piotr Kłodkowski for Doskonały smak orientu ("Exquisite Taste of the Orient") and Andrzej Stasiuk for Jadąc do Babadag ("Travelling to Babadag")
- 2003 - Anna Fostakowska for Spuść oczy, płacz
