= Jagoda Grondecka =

Polish iranologist and journalist (born 1993)

- Born: 28 May 1993 (age 33)
- Citizenship: Poland
- Education: University of Warsaw
- Occupations: journalist, iranologist

Jagoda Grondecka (born 28 May 1993) is a Polish iranologist and journalist specialized in Middle Eastern affairs.

== Life ==
Jagoda Grondecka comes from Głuszyca in Dolny Śląsk. She attended high school in the city of Wałbrzych and during this time, she became a finalist of a Polish Language Contest three times. Grondecka graduated in 2016 from University of Warsaw with a Bachelors degree in Iranian studies and later finished her MA degree at the faculty of Foreign Affairs. Grondecka did internships in Polish embassies in Tehran and Islamabad.

She has been working for Polish newspapers such as Krytyka Polityczna, Kultura Liberalna, Gazeta Wyborcza and Polityka as well as international media like The New Arab. Grondecka was the only Polish journalist reporting live from Afghanistan during the 2021 Taliban offensive. In her reports from Afghanistan she focused mainly on the daily life and the situation of women. Grondecka supported the evacuation of ten Afghans to Poland in August 2021. Since January 2026, she has been working with the editorial team of polish television TVP Info, commenting on international affairs. In May 2026, her first book "Emirat to My. Jak Talibowie zdobywali Afganistan" (We Are the Emirate: How the Taliban Retook Afghanistan) was published by Czarne Publishing House.

== Awards ==
- 2021 – The Feather of Hope, Amnesty International Poland
- 2021 – "Journalist Citizen 2021", Polish Journalists Association
- 2021 – nominated for award by Janina Paradowska and Jerzy Zimowski Foundation
- 2021 – Beata Pawlak Award by Stefan Batory Foundation
- 2021 – 2nd place in Grand Press Contest "Journalist of the Year 2021"
- 2022 – Readers Award of "Wysokie Obcasy"
