= Found in Translation Award =

Annual award for best translation of Polish literature into English

- Awarded for: The best translation of Polish literature into English.
- Sponsored by: The Book Institute, the Polish Cultural Institute in London, the Polish Cultural Institute in New York, and the Polish Institute in New Delhi.
- Country: Poland

The Found in Translation Award is an annual award for the best translation of Polish literature into English. The award is given to the translator(s) who also receive a cash prize of 16,000 zł.

The award was established by the Kraków-based Book Institute, the Polish Cultural Institute in London, the Polish Cultural Institute in New York and the W.A.B. Publishing House in Warsaw on 15 October 2007. Since 2015, the FIL Award has been awarded by the Book Institute, the Polish Cultural Institute in London and the Polish Cultural Institute in New York (in 2016, they were joined by the Polish Institute in New Delhi). The first winner of the award was announced in 2008.

== Winners ==
- 2008 – Bill Johnston, translator of Tadeusz Różewicz's New Poems (Archipelago Books, 2007)
- 2009 – Antonia Lloyd-Jones, translator of Paweł Huelle's The Last Supper (Serpent's Tail, 2008)
- 2010 – Danuta Borchardt, translator of Witold Gombrowicz's Pornografia (Grove/Atlantic, 2009)
- 2011 – Clare Cavanagh and Stanisław Barańczak, translators of Wisława Szymborska's Here (Houghton Mifflin Harcourt, 2010)
- 2012 – Joanna Trzeciak, translator of Tadeusz Różewicz's Sobbing Superpower (W. W. Norton, 2011)
- 2013 – Antonia Lloyd-Jones, translator of seven books published in 2012:
  - Paweł Huelle's Cold Sea Stories (Comma Press, 2012)
  - Jacek Dehnel's Saturn (Dedalus Press, 2012)
  - Zygmunt Miłoszewski's A Grain of Truth (Bitter Lemon Press, 2012)
  - Artur Domosławski's Ryszard Kapuściński, A Life (Verso Books, 2012)
  - Wojciech Jagielski's The Night Wanderers (Seven Stories & Old Street Publishing, 2012)
  - Andrzej Szczeklik's Kore: On Sickness, the Sick and the Search for the Soul of Medicine (Counterpoint Press, 2012)
  - Janusz Korczak's Kaytek the Wizard (Urim Publications/Penlight Press, 2012)
- 2014 – Philip Boehm, translator of Hanna Krall's Chasing the King of Hearts (Peirene Press, 2013)
- 2015 – Ursula Phillips, translator of Zofia Nałkowska's Choucas (Northern Illinois University Press, 2014)
- 2016 – Bill Johnston, translator of Tomasz Różycki's Twelve Stations (Zephyr Press, 2015)
- 2017 – Piotr Florczyk, translator of Anna Świrszczyńska's volume of poetry Building the Barricade (Tavern Books, 2016)
- 2018 – Jennifer Croft, translator of Olga Tokarczuk's Flights (Fitzcarraldo Editions/Text Publishing, 2017)
- 2019 – Madeline G. Levine, translator of Bruno Schulz's Collected Stories (Northwestern University Press, 2018)
- 2020 – Anna Zaranko, translator of Kornel Filipowicz's The Memoir of an Anti-Hero (Penguin Modern Classics, 2019)
- 2021 – Ewa Małachowska-Pasek and Megan Thomas, translators of Tadeusz Dołęga-Mostowicz's The Career of Nicodemus Dyzma (Northwestern University Press, 2020)
- 2022 – Jennifer Croft, translator of Olga Tokarczuk's The Books of Jacob (Fitzcarraldo Editions, 2021)
- 2023 – Anna Zaranko, translator of Władysław Reymont's The Peasants (Penguin Classics, 2022)
- 2024 – Alissa Valles, translator of Zuzanna Ginczanka's Firebird (New York Review Books Poets, 2023)
- 2025 – Mira Rosenthal, translator of Tomasz Różycki's To the Letter (Archipelago Books, 2024)
- 2026 – Ursula Phillips, translator of Jacek Dukaj's Ice (Head of Zeus, 2025)
