= Witold Szabłowski =

Polish journalist and author (born 1980)

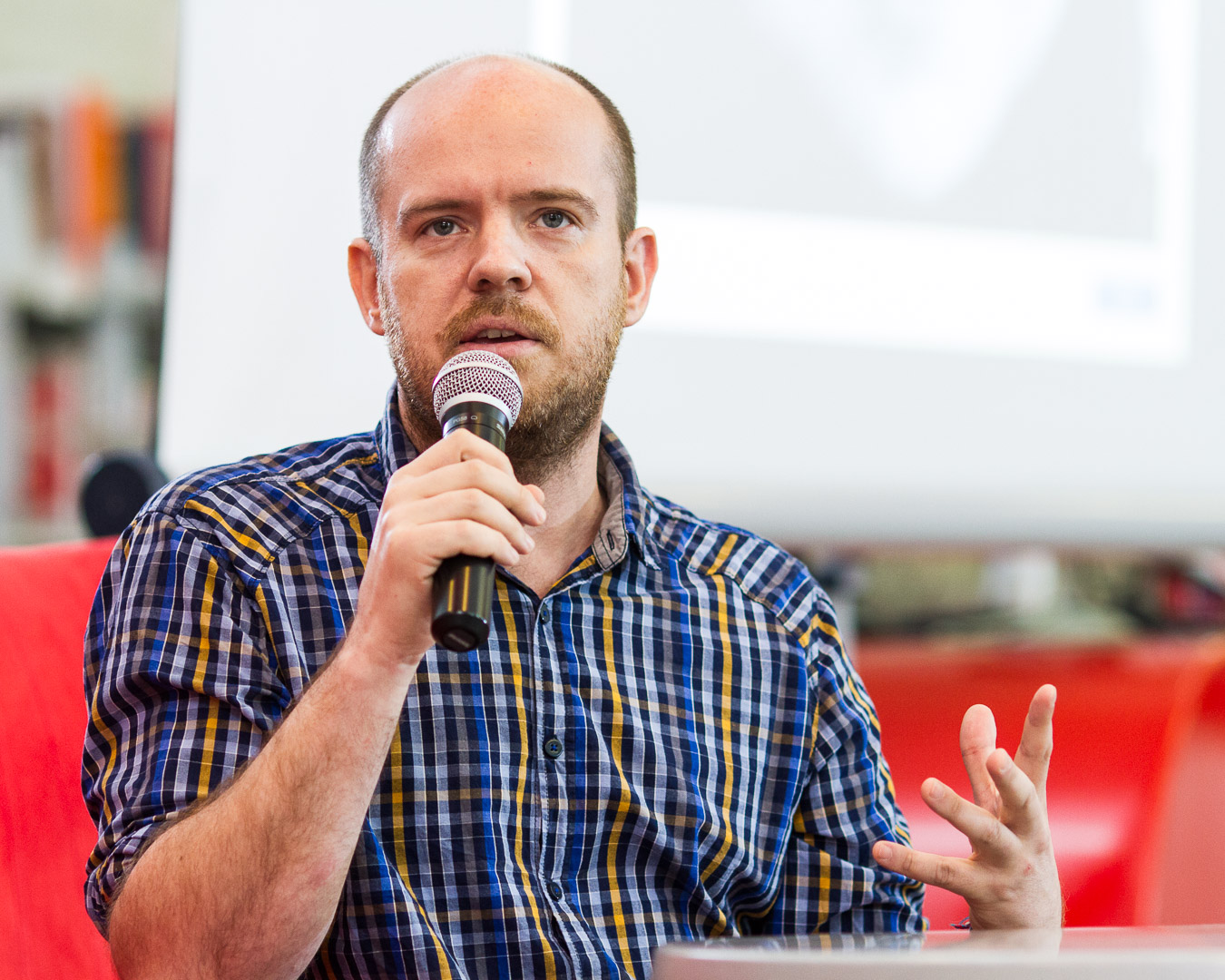
Witold Szabłowski, 2015

Witold Szabłowski (Polish: [ˈvitɔlt ʂaˈbwɔfskʲi]; born 1980 in Ostrów Mazowiecka) is a Polish journalist and author.

== Biography ==
Witold Szablowski was born in Ostrów Mazowiecka. He graduated from the Department of Journalism and Political Science at Warsaw University. Additionally, he pursued studies in political science in Istanbul.

While working as an intern at CNN Türk, he traveled throughout Turkey. He initiated his journalistic career with TVN24, one of Poland's premier news channels. In 2006, he began working for ”Gazeta Wyborcza” and its weekly supplement “Duży Format”, becoming the youngest reporter on its team. He remained there until 2016. Since 2018, he has been affiliated with "Dzień dobry TVN," a Polish morning show broadcast. Starting from April 2019, he has hosted his radio show about traveling on Newonce Radio.

In 2006, while in Malatya, he became the first Pole to interview Mehmet Ali Ağca's family, the Turkish gunman who attempted to assassinate Pope John Paul II. Additionally, he successfully established contact with Oral Celik, the lesser-known organizer of the attack, who also targeted the Polish Pope. In 2008 he won the 2007 Melchior Wańkowicz Award in the category of Inspiration of the Year for his “devotion to the best traditions of reportage – his honest documentation of aspects of Turkish society not widely known outside of the country, and his concise but vivid use of language”.

Also in 2008, he received an honourable mention from Amnesty International for the best human rights journalism – for his report on Turkish honour killings, "To z miłości, siostro" ("It's Out of Love, Sister"), which appeared in “Duży Format”. He wrote about the situation of women in Turkey who were subjected to rape and honour killing for the "sin" of wanting to decide their own fates.

In 2010 he was the first European journalist to interview Aung San Suu Kyi, the current Burmese Prime Minister, when she was released from home arrest (the one who helped him was Lech Wałęsa). Also in this year he published his first book The Assassin From Apricot City. Reportages from Turkey (Czarne Publishing House, 2010) for which he was awarded Beata Pawlak Award, the book was also nominated for the 2011 Nike Literary Award. The English-language publication received the British PEN-Club Award, and “World Literature Today” acknowledged it to be one of the most important books translated into English the previous year.

In 2012, he received a special mention for the Anna Lindh Mediterranean Journalist Award in the press category for his article titled Let Us In, You Bastards! The piece explored the fall of Communism in Albania and the subsequent immigration from Albania to EU countries. In order to write about Albanian border jumpers, he personally crossed the border illegally himself. The jury chaired by French philosopher Edgar Morin, wrote: "Easy and pleasant to read, but if you read more closely, you realize that his articles are very profound".

After a journey to Cuba, he wondered if something important had been lost in the change from communism to capitalism. He and his wife, Izabela Meyza, decided to live for the year of 2012 as if they were in Communist times. They wore clothes from Communist times, refrained from buying things not available in the Polish People's Republic, and sought out games and objects from the Communist era. Together they wrote a book about their experiences, Nasz mały PRL. Pół roku w M-3, z trwałą, wąsami i maluchem ("Our Little Polish People's Republic: Six Months in a Three-room Apartment with a Perm, a Moustache, and a Fiat 126p”)

In 2014 he published Tańczące niedźwiedzie ("Dancing Bears"), a collection of reportages about nations across Central Europe and their way to freedom, in which he writes about the creation of reserves for bears previously used as dancing bears to entertain people. He uses the experiences of the former dancing bears to explore differences between communist and capitalist systems. The book received rave reviews: The New York Times called it “a pearl” (in Orlando Figes's review) and Timothy Garton Ash (from “Foreign Affairs”) wrote: “This is a Milan Kundera remake of Dances With Wolves”. The book was called one of the best books of the year 2018 by National Public Radio (NPR), the biggest public radio network of the United States. In 2019 the book was nominated for The Edward Stanford Travel Writing Awards as the only non-English book.

In 2016 Szablowski's book Sprawiedliwi zdrajcy. Sąsiedzi z Wołynia (“Righteous Traitors. Neighbours from Volhynia”) was published. It depicts the fate of the victims and witnesses of the 1943-1944 massacres of Poles in Volhynia. Szabłowski's main focus is on Ukrainians who at great personal risk provided help to their neighbours, Polish or Jewish. The book was awarded Terena Torańska Newseek Prize in the same year and is considered some of the best reporting of the massacres of Poles in Volhynia.

In 2018 a new edition of "The Assassin From Apricot City" was published, under the new title of Merhaba (W.A.B. Publishing House) and supplemented with author's Turkish-Polish dictionary. In 2019 his new book will be published in Poland and US, under the Polish title "Kucharze dyktatorów" (“Dictators’ Chef”). For the last 3 years he has been reaching and interviewing chefs who cooked for 20th and 21st-century autocrats. The book is a result of the interviews and the recipes he collected.

== Awards ==
- Amnesty International – honourable mention for his report It's Out of Love, Sister, 2008
- Melchior Wańkowicz Award in the category of Inspiration of the Year, 2008
- European Parliament Journalism Prize for his reportage Today Two Corpses Will Float to This Place (2010)
- Nike Literary Award – nominated for The Assassin From Apricot City, 2011
- Beata Pawlak Award for The Assassin From Apricot City, 2011
- Angelus Central European Literature Award for The Assassin From Apricot City, 2011
- Anna Lindh Mediterranean Journalist Award in the press category for Let Us In, You Bastards!, 2012
- Polish Press Agency Ryszard Kapuściński Award for The House Full of Ukrainians, 2013
- British Pen Club Award for English edition of The Assassin From Apricot City, 2014
- Terena Torańska Newseek Prize for Righteous Traitors. Neighbours from Volhynia, 2016
- Edward Stanford Travel Writing Awards – nominated for Dancing Bears, 2019

== Bibliography ==
- Zabójca z miasta moreli (The Assassin from Apricot City), Wołowiec, Czarne, 2010.
- Nasz mały PLR. Pół roku w M- 3 z trwałą, wąsami i maluchem (Our Little Polish People's Republic: Six Months in a Three-room Apartment with a Perm, a Moustache and a Fiat 126p– with Izabela Meyza), Kraków, Znak, 2012.
- Tańczące niedźwiedzie (Dancing Bears), Warszawa, Agora SA, 2014.
- Sprawiedliwi zdrajcy. Sąsiedzi z Wołynia, Kraków, Znak, 2016.
- Merhaba, Warszawa, W.A.B., 2018.

== Translations ==
Zabójca z miasta moreli

- English:
  - The Assassin From Apricot City, transl. Antonia Lloyd-Jones, London, Stork Press, 2013.
- Estonian
  - Mõrtsukas aprikooside linnast, transl. Hendrik Lindepuu, Tartu, Hendrik Lindepuu kirjastus, 2015.
- German
  - Weil ich dich liebe, Schwester. Reportagen aus der Türkei, transl. Joanna Manc, Vliegen Verlag, 2015.
  - Wie man einen Diktator satt bekommt, transl. Paulina Schulz-Gruner, KATAPULT-Verlag, 2021.
- Russian
  - Убийца из города абрикосов, transl. Madina Alekseeva, Corpus, 2015.
- Ukrainian
  - Убивця з міста абрикосів, transl. Dzvinka Matiyash, Tempora, 2012.
- Traditional Chinese
  - 克里姆林的餐桌, transl. 葉祉君, 衛城出版, 2023.
