= Joanna Bator =

Polish novelist (born 1968)

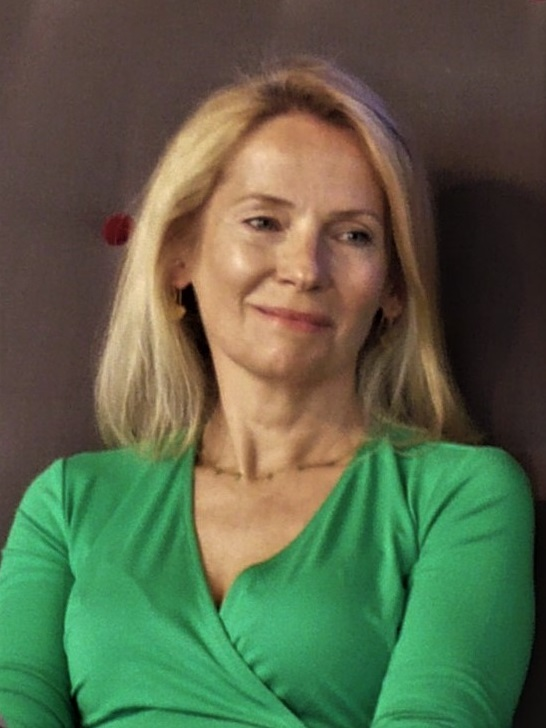
- Bator in 2023
- Born: 2 February 1968 (age 58); Wałbrzych, Poland
- Education: University of Wrocław
- Occupations: Novelist, journalist, academic
- Awards: Beata Pawlak Award (2005); Nike Award (2013); Gloria Artis Medal for Merit to Culture (2015); Calw Hermann Hesse Prize (2018)

Joanna Bator (born 2 February 1968) is a Polish novelist, journalist, feminist and academic. She specializes in cultural anthropology and gender studies. She is the recipient of the 2013 Nike Award, Poland's top literature prize.

== Life and career ==
Joanna Bator was born in the town of Wałbrzych in Lower Silesia, south-western Poland, to father Janusz Bator and mother Elżbieta (née Borowiecka). She studied cultural studies at the University of Wrocław. She also graduated from the School of Social Sciences affiliated with the Polish Academy of Sciences in Warsaw. Her doctoral dissertation concerned the philosophical aspects of the feminist theory and discourse relating to psychoanalysis and postmodernism.

In the years 1999–2008 she worked as an assistant professor at the Department of Philosophy and Sociology of the Polish Academy of Sciences. Between 2007–2011 she lectured at the Polish-Japanese Academy of Information Technology. She also took part in a number of scholarships including at the New School for Social Research in New York and Japan Foundation in Tokyo.

She is known for her keen interest in Japanese culture. Bator's first book on Japan was Japoński wachlarz (The Japanese Fan) written after her two-year stay in Japan.

She has written a number of books, both fiction and non-fiction. Her titles such as The Japanese Fan and Sandy Mountain have received wide acclaim in her native Poland. In 2010, she was nominated for Gdynia Literary Prize and Nike Award for her book Sandy Mountain. In 2013, her novel Ciemno, prawie noc (Eng: Dark, Almost Night) won the Nike Award, Poland's leading literary award.

She has also worked as a columnist for Gazeta Wyborcza daily as well as Pani and published articles in such magazines as Tygodnik Powszechny, Twórczość, Bluszcz, Czas kultury and Kultura i społeczeństwo. She has been a member of jury of the Ryszard Kapuściński Award.

In 2014 she was the second Friedrich Dürrenmatt Guest Professor for World Literature at the University of Bern.

In 2015, she was awarded the Silver Gloria Artis Medal for Merit to Culture. In 2018, together with her translator Esther Kinsky, she was awarded the Calw Hermann Hesse Prize.

== Works ==
- Feminizm, postmodernizm, psychoanaliza (Feminism, Postmodernism, Psychoanalysis), Gdańsk, 2001
- Kobieta (A Woman), Twój Styl, Warsaw, 2002
- Japoński wachlarz (The Japanese Fan), Twój Styl, Warsaw, 2004
- Piaskowa Góra (Sandy Mountain), Wydawnictwo W.A.B., Warsaw, 2009
- Chmurdalia (Cloudalia), Wydawnictwo W.A.B., Warsaw, 2010
- Japoński wachlarz. Powroty (The Japanese Fan. Returns), Wydawnictwo W.A.B., Warsaw, 2011
- Ciemno, prawie noc (Dark, Almost Night), Wydawnictwo W.A.B., Warsaw, 2013
- Rekin z parku Yoyogi (A Shark from Yoyogi Park), Wydawnictwo W.A.B., Warsaw, 2014
- Wyspa Łza (Tear Island), Wydawnictwo Znak, Kraków, 2015
- Rok królika (Year of the Rabbit), Wydawnictwo Znak, Kraków, 2016
- Purezento, Wydawnictwo Znak, Kraków, 2017
- Gorzko, gorzko, Wydawnictwo Znak, Kraków, 2020
- Ucieczka niedźwiedzicy, Wydawnictwo Znak, Kraków, 2022

== See also ==
- Nike Award
- Beata Pawlak Award
- Polish literature
- List of Polish-language authors
