= Adam Lach =

Polish photographer (born 1983)

Adam Lach (born in 1983 in Poznan) is a Polish photographer. He is the co-founder of Napo Images and vice president of the Napo Foundation. His photographs have been featured in The New York Times, Le Monde, GEO magazine, The New Yorker, and Vice. He is the winner of several photo contests, including Pictures of the Year International and International Photography Awards. His photo essays have appeared at international exhibitions, including Polka Galerie at HSBC in Paris, the Prague Biennale, and the World Photojournalism Festival in Beijing. Between 2010 and 2012, he taught two subjects, Press Photography and Reportage and New Media, at the Institute of Journalism at the University of Warsaw.

== Books ==
- Neverland - ISBN 978-83-924220-8-2
- Stigma - ISBN 978-83-939574-2-2

== Awards ==
- 2018 - Picture of the Year - Grand Press Photo
- 2017 - Photobook of the Year for book Neverland - Grand Press Photo, Warsaw, Poland
- 2014 – Winner of Beata Pawlak Award for Stigma organized by Stefan Batory Foundation
- 2014 – IPA 1st Prize Winner for Book Stigma in Self Published Professional category
- 2014 – Picture of the Year, Award of Excellence in Issue Reporting Picture Story for Stigma project
- 2011 – II prize in category Sport for single image "Sumo Twins" in Grand Press Photo
- 2010 – II prize in category Nature for picture story "The ecological Tragedy in Poland" in the BZWBK Press Photo Contest
- 2009 – Honorable mention for picture story "Sacred Refuge" in the BZWBK Press Photo Contest
- 2008 – Second Prize for the reportage "The Capital" in category Daily Life in the Newsreportage contest of the "Newsweek Polska"
- 2008 – Second Prize for the reportage "The Children of Bermuda Triangle" in category People in the Newsreportage contest of the "Newsweek Polska"
- 2008 – Third Prize for the reportage „8 Photographs of Warsaw" in the category „Civilisation" in the BZ WBK Press Photo Contest
- 2008 – Second Prize for the reportage „Bogdan Zietek – the Sculptor" in the category „Portrait" in the BZ WBK Press Photo Contest
- 2007 – Third Prize for the reportage „Yorkland" in the category „Culture" in the Newsreportaz Contest of the „Newsweek Polska"
- 2007 – Special Award of the „Rzeczpospolita" daily for „Suzuki Method" in the BZ WBK Press Photo Contest
- 2007 – First Prize for the reportage „World Hairdressing Centre" in the category „Civilisation" in the BZ WBK Press Photo Contest
- 2007 – First Prize for the reportage „Suzuki Method" in the category „Society" in the BZ WBK Press Photo Contest
- 2007 – Second Prize for the reportage „Suzuki Method" in the category „Culture and Art" Press Photography Contest
- 2007 – Third Prize for the reportage „World Hairdressing Centre" in the category „Contemporary Concerns" in the Press Photography Contest
