= Mikołajewski =

Mikołajewski (feminine Mikołajewska) is a Polish surname. Notable people with the surname include:

- Daniel Mikołajewski (born 1999), Polish football player
- Daniel Mikołajewski (born 2006), Polish football player
- Jarosław Mikołajewski (born 1960), Polish poet
- Krystyna Mikołajewska, Polish actress
- Pete Mikolajewski (born 1943), American football player
