= Joanna Skrzydlewska =

Polish politician (born 1977)

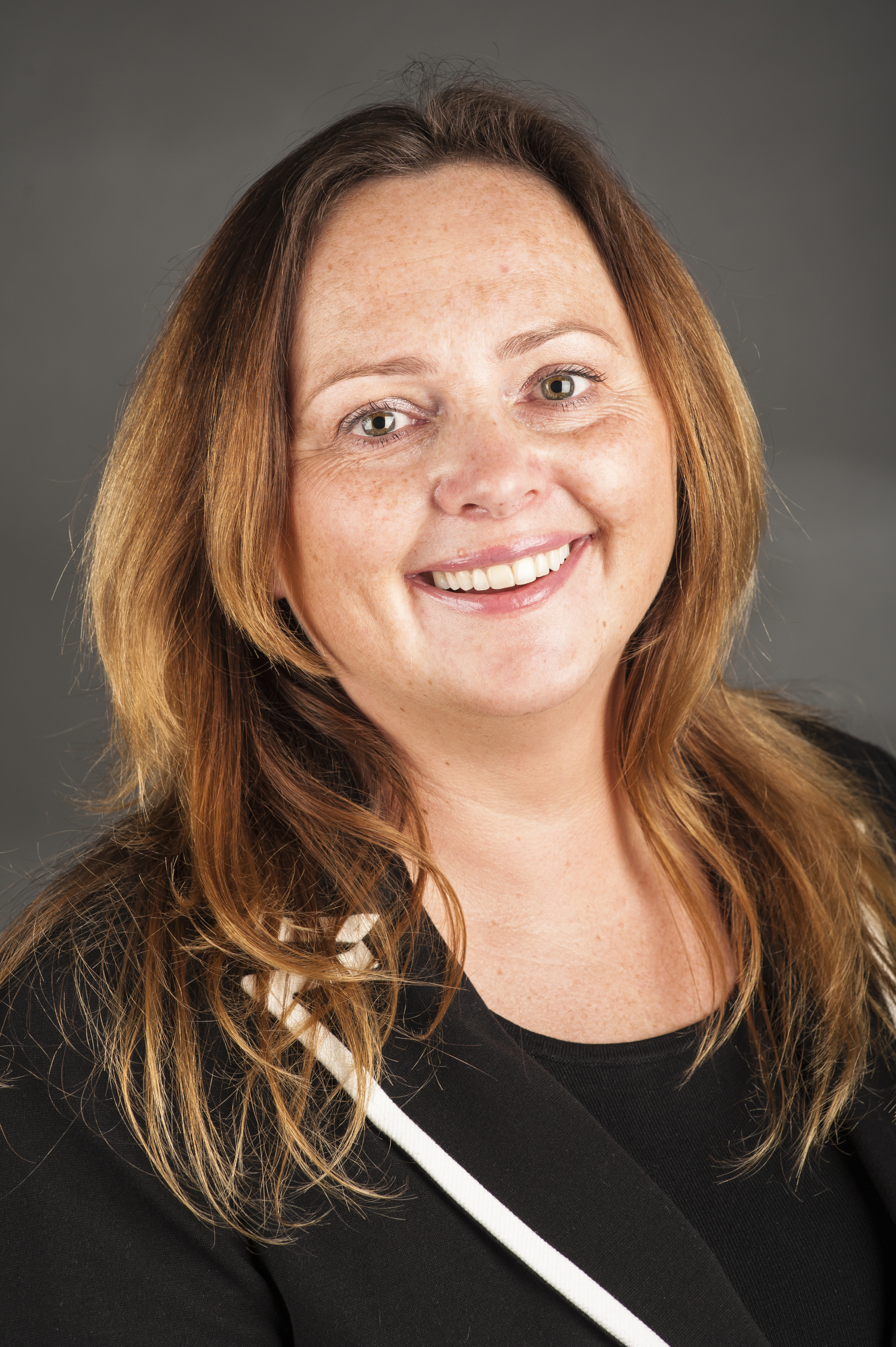

Marshal of Lodz Voivodeship
- Incumbent
- Assumed office 11 June 2024
- Preceded by: Grzegorz Schreiber

Member of the European Parliament
- In office 14 July 2009 – 1 July 2014
- Constituency: 6 – Łódź

Member of the Sejm
- In office 19 October 2005 – 10 June 2009
- Constituency: 9 – Łódź

Personal details
- Born: 17 February 1977 (age 49)
- Party: Civic Platform

Joanna Katarzyna Skrzydlewska (born 17 February 1977 in Łódź) is a Polish politician. She was elected to the Sejm on 25 September 2005, getting 11,822 votes in 9 Łódź district as a candidate from the Civic Platform list.

== Career ==
She is a member of Civic Platform. In 2009, she was elected to the European Parliament from Łódź constituency. She lost her re-election bid five years later. She ran again to the European Parliament in 2019 and 2024, but she didn't gain enough votes to win a seat.

She was elected to the Łódź Voivodeship Sejmik in 2014 and re-elected in 2018. She was a member of the voivodeship board until 2018. In 2019, she resigned from the Sejmik after being appointed as Vice-Mayor of Łódź. She returned to the Voivodeship Sejmik in April 2024. In June 2024, she was elected by Civic Coalition, Third Way and The Left as the 7th Marshal of Lodz Voivodeship. She is the first female Marshal of this voivodeship.

== Personal life ==
She is a member of the Skrzydlewski family that own the Lodz's largest florist and funeral home chains. Her father, Witold Skrzydlewski, was the subject of a documentary called Skin Hunters, where he was one of two funeral home operators accused of paying for information from paramedics so as to profit from patients' deaths. The other funeral home owner has been convicted and an investigation is ongoing regarding her father's involvement, if any.

== See also ==
- Members of Polish Sejm 2005-2007
