= Piotr Florczyk =

Polish poet, translator, essayist, and critic

Piotr Florczyk (born 18 May 1978 in Kraków, Poland) is a poet, translator, essayist, and critic. His honors include the 2017 Found in Translation Award (an annual prize for the best translation of Polish literature into English) and the 2017 Harold Morton Landon Translation Award from the Academy of American Poets for his translation of Anna Świrszczyńska's Building the Barricade.
