= Jarosław Mikołajewski =

Polish poet, writer and translator of the Italian language

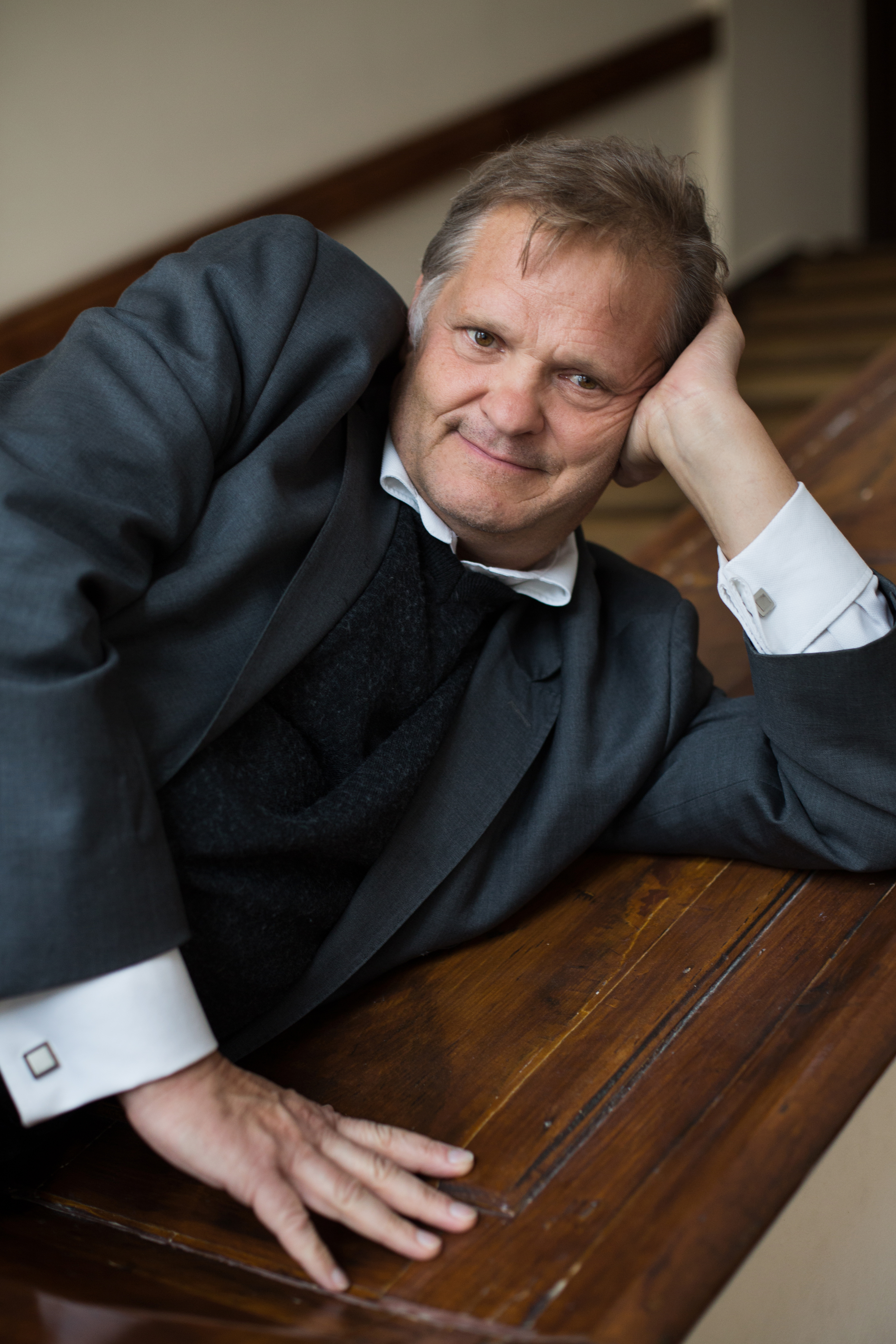
Image of Jaroslaw Mikołajewski

Jarosław Mikołajewski (born 20 March 1960 in Warsaw) is a Polish poet, writer and translator of the Italian language. He is also the author of children's books, essayist and journalist.

== Life and career ==
Between 1983-1998, he worked at the Faculty of Italian Studies of the University of Warsaw. Since 1998, he has been working for the Gazeta Wyborcza daily newspaper. Between 2006-2012, he served as head of the Polish Institute in Rome.

His books were published in Poland, Italy, the Netherlands, United States, Hungary, United Kingdom. His work is also translated to following languages: Albanian, German, Spanish, Croatian, Bulgarian, Czech, Ukrainian, Greek. He translated among others: Dante, Petrarch, Michelangelo, Leopardi, Montale, Ungaretti, Luzi, Penna, Pavese, Pasolini.

He also translated children's classic to Polish - among others: Carlo Collodi's Pinocchio (Polish title Pinokio: historia pajacyka, 2011) and some works of Gianni Rodari.

In several volumes, and especially in Którzy mnie znają / Those Who Know Me (2003), he reaches for the eternal subjects of poetry: love and death.

His Froth: Poems (Zbite szklanki: wybór wierszy, 2010) translated into English was named among the 75 best of the year 2013 by World Literature Today (WLT).

He is the recipient of the Kazimiera Iłłakowiczówna Poetry Award (1991), Literary Award of the Capital city of Warsaw (2011, 2012), Silver Medal for Merit to Culture - Gloria Artis (2014) Beata Pawlak Award (2016), and the Konstanty Ildefons Gałczyński Award (2019). He is also a juror for the Zbigniew Herbert International Literary Award.

In 2019, he published a book Cień w cień. Za cieniem Zuzanny Ginczanki which deals with the life and literary legacy of Zuzanna Ginczanka, one of the greatest poets of the interwar period in Poland.

== Selected works ==
=== Poetry ===
- A świadkiem śnieg (1991)
- Kołysanka dla ojca (1994)
- Zabójstwo z miłości (1997)
- Mój dom przestały nawiedzać duchy. Wiersze z lat 1988-1998 (1998)
- Nie dochodząc Pięknej (2000) - (Not Reaching Piękna)
- Którzy mnie znają (2003) - (Those Who Know Me)
- Któraś rano (2005)
- Coś mnie zmartwiło ale zapomniałem (2008)
- Zbite szklanki (2010) - (Froth: Poems)
- Na wdechu (2012)

=== Prose ===
- Herbata dla wielbłąda czyli Sprawy i sprawki detektywa McCoya (2004) – Crime fiction
- Męski zmysł (2005)
- Rzymska komedia (2011) - (Roman Comedy)
- Największe szczęście, największy ból (2014, a5) – conversations with Julia Hartwig
- Uśmiech Bambola (2015, Media Rodzina) – children's detective story
- Szklane oczy (2015, Media Rodzina) – children's detective story
- Zwycięski koń (2015, Media Rodzina) – children's detective story
- Wielki przypływ (2015, Dowody na istnienie) – reportage
- Syreni śpiew (2016, Media Rodzina) – children's detective story
- Kot w worku (2016, Media Rodzina) – children's detective story
- Wędrówka Nabu (2016, Austeria) – children's short story
- Terremoto (2017, Dowody na Istnienie) – reportage nominated to the Nike Award in 2018
- Szpitalne (2018, Austeria) - essay
- Syrakuzańskie (2019, Austeria) - a reportage
- Cień w cień. Za cieniem Zuzanny Ginczanki (2019, Dowody na Istnienie) - a biographic essay
