= Tadeusz Dąbrowski =

Polish poet, essayist and critic

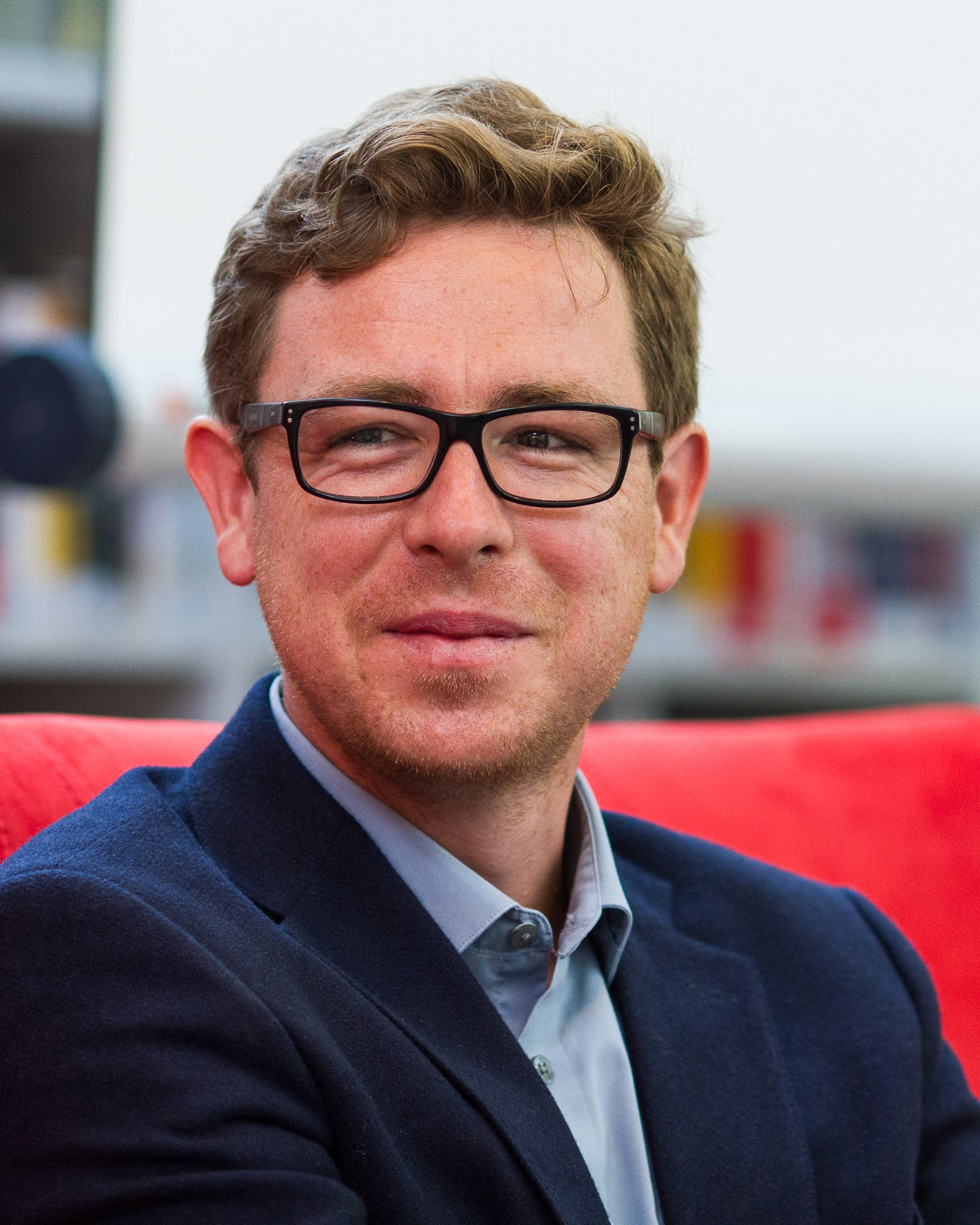
Tadeusz Dąbrowski, 2015

Tadeusz Dąbrowski (born 1979) is a Polish poet, essayist, and critic. He is also the editor of the literary bimonthly Topos and co-editor of the poetry podcast on Radio Gdańsk. He was (2012-2019) the art director of the European Poet of Freedom Festival.

Dąbrowski has been published in many journals in Poland (among others: Tygodnik Powszechny, Zeszyty Literackie, Polityka, Rzeczpospolita, Dziennik, Twórczość, Odra, Chimera, Res Publica Nowa, Kresy) and abroad (The New Yorker, Paris Review, Boston Review, Agni, American Poetry Review, Ploughshares, Tin House, Harvard Review, Crazyhorse, Little Star, Little Star Weekly, Guernica, The Common, Tikkun, Poetry Daily, 3 Quarks Daily, Image, Body, Arc Poetry Magazine, Poetry Review, Modern Poetry in Translation, Poetry Ireland, Poetry London, The Reader, Shearsman, Poetry Wales, 3:AM, Seam, Other Poetry, iota, Poetry Salzburg Review, Frankfurter Allgemeine Zeitung, Neue Zürcher Zeitung, Akzente, Sprache im technischen Zeitalter, EDIT, Ostragehege, manuskripte, Lichtungen, Karogs).

He has been a recipient of stipends awarded by Landis & Gyr (Switzerland, 2019), Literaturhaus Zürich (2016), Yaddo (USA, 2015), the Omi International Arts Center (USA, 2013), Vermont Studio Center (2011), Literatur Lana (Italy, 2011), Internationales Haus der Autoren Graz (2008), Polish Minister of Culture (2007, 2010), Literarisches Colloquium Berlin (2006, 2012), and the Baltic Centre for Writers and Translators (Visby, 2004, 2010).

He has also been the winner of numerous awards, among others, the Horst Bienek Prize (Germany, 2014), the Kościelski Prize (2009), the Literary Award of the Capital City of Warsaw (2014), the Hubert Burda Prize (Germany, 2008) and, from Tadeusz Różewicz, the Prize of the Foundation for Polish Culture (2006). He has been nominated for NIKE, the most important Polish literary award (2010).

He is the author of nine volumes of poetry, and edited the anthology Poza słowa. His work has been translated into 30 languages, and two collections of his poetry in English, Black Square (2011), and POSTS (2017), translated by Antonia Lloyd-Jones, were published by Zephyr Press.

He lives in Gdańsk.

== Bibliography ==
=== Poetry ===
Collections and anthologies

- Wypieki (Wydawnictwo UG, Gdańsk 1999)
- e-mail (Biblioteka Toposu, Sopot 2000)
- mazurek (Wydawnictwo Zielona Sowa, Kraków 2002)
- (ed.) Poza słowa. Antologia wierszy 1976–2006 (słowo/ obraz terytoria, Gdańsk 2006)
- Te Deum (Wydawnictwo a5, Kraków 2005, 2008)
- Czarny kwadrat (Wydawnictwo a5, Kraków 2009)
- Schwarzes Quadrat auf schwarzem Grund (Luxbooks, Wiesbaden 2010)
- Black Square, translated by Antonia Lloyd-Jones (Zephyr Press, Brookline 2011)
- Чорний квадрат (вибранi вiршi) (Meridian Czernowitz, Chernivtsi 2013)
- Pomiędzy (Wydawnictwo a5, Kraków 2013)
- (ed.) Zuzanna Ginczanka, Wniebowstąpienie Ziemi (Biuro Literackie, Wrocław 2014)
- Die Bäume spielen Wald (Carl Hanser Verlag, Munich 2014)
- Te Deum (Hendrik Lindepuu Kirjastus, Tartu 2015)
- Černý čtverec (Větrné mlýny, Brno 2015)
- Te Deum (Ediciones de la Isla de Siltolá, Sevilla 2016)
- (ed.) Henryk Cześnik i poeci / Henryk Cześnik and His Poets [bilingual edition], (Gdański Teatr Szekspirowski, Gdańsk 2016)
- Bezbronna kreska (Biuro Literackie, Stronie Śląskie 2016)
- Środek wyrazu (Wydawnictwo a5, Kraków 2016)
- Idag har jag åter hört tystnaden efter mig (Smockadoll förlag, Malmö 2017)
- Црни квадрат (Treći Trg, Belgrad 2019)
- Засіб вираження (Крок, Тarnopol 2019)
- Тишината след мен (Ergo, Sofia 2019)
- Eine Liebe in New York (Schöffling & Co., Frankfurt am Main 2019)
- Scrabble (PIW, Warszawa 2020)
- Wenn die Welt schläft (Schöffling & Co., Frankfurt am Main 2022)
- To jest fajka (collected poems, PIW, Warszawa 2022)

List of poems

Title	Year	First published	Reprinted/collected
People exchange words	2014	Dąbrowski, Tadeusz (March 31, 2014). "People exchange words". The New Yorker. Vol. 90, no. 6. Translated by Antonia Lloyd-Jones. p. 46.	
