= Grzegorz Sroczyński =

Polish journalist (born 1974)

- Born: 1974 (age 51–52)
- Occupation: Journalist

Grzegorz Sroczyński (born 1974) is a journalist.

== Biography ==
From 1999 until 2017 he worked in Gazeta Wyborcza. Later he worked in the Tok FM radio and Gazeta.pl. In September 2023 he started working at the RMF FM.

== Books ==
- Świat się chwieje: 20 rozmów o tym, co z nami dalej. Agora SA. 2015.

A collection of interviews concerning the social, political and mental condition of the Third Polish Republic, especially in the context of the political transformation; Sroczyński's interlocutors included Marcin Król, Andrzej Leder, Jan Krzysztof Bielecki, Karol Modzelewski, Jerzy Hausner, Janina Ochojska, and Piotr Ikonowicz.

== Accolades ==
- Grand Press Award for the interview Byliśmy głupi with Marcin Król (2014)
