= Leonard Nathan =

American poet and critic (1924–2007)

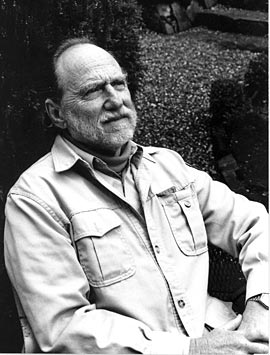
- Photo courtesy of Andrew Nathan
- Born: Edward Leonard Nathan; November 8, 1924; El Monte, California
- Died: June 3, 2007 (aged 82); Marin, California
- Occupations: Poet, professor of rhetoric and oral interpretation
- Spouse: Carol N. Nathan
- Children: Andrew Peter, Julia Irene, Miriam Abigail

Leonard E. Nathan, (November 8 1924 – June 3, 2007) was an American poet, critic, and professor emeritus of rhetoric at the University of California, Berkeley where he retired in 1991.

Born in El Monte, California, Nathan earned a bachelor's degree in English at UC Berkeley in 1950, a master's degree in English in 1952 and a Ph.D. in 1961. He was then hired as a lecturer in UC Berkeley's Department of Speech, and was promoted to associate professor in 1965 and to professor in 1968.

Among other honors, he received the National Institute of Arts and Letters prize for poetry, a Guggenheim Fellowship, the Phelan Award for Narrative Poetry, and three silver medals from the Commonwealth Club of California, including one for The Potato Eaters. His poems were also published in The New Yorker, The Atlantic, New England Review and The Georgia Review, among other publications.

== Overview ==
The author of 17 volumes of poetry, Nathan has been described as "a fixture for 50 years in literary circles both on and off the UC Berkeley campus." Ted Kooser, a recent U.S. poet laureate and an English professor at the University of Nebraska–Lincoln, counted Nathan among his mentors, particularly for his "economy of words."

"He was among the finest poets of his generation and will be missed by all of us who practice the art", said Kooser, who struck up a correspondence with Nathan in the 1970s after complimenting Nathan on a poem he had seen in a magazine.

Nathan's first book of poems, Western Reaches, brims with images of the California landscape. After a year in India, he published a book about his experiences there titled, The Likeness: Poems out of India. That same year, Princeton University Press published Nathan's Returning Your Call, which was nominated for a National Book Award.

His prose included Diary of a Left-Handed Bird Watcher and The Poet's Work, an Introduction to Czesław Miłosz. He also collaborated on a number of translations, most notably with Milosz on the poems of Anna Swir and Aleksander Wat.

Nathan died in Marin, California in 2007.

== Bibliography ==
- Western Reaches (Talisman Press, 1958)
- Glad and Sorry Seasons (Random House, 1964)
- The Tragic Drama of William Butler Yeats: Figures in a Dance (Columbia University Press, 1965)
- The Matchmaker's Lament (Gehenna Press, 1967)
- The Day the Perfect Speakers Left (Wesleyan University Press, 1969)
- Flight Plan (Cedar Hill Press, 1971)
- First Person, Second Person, A Selection from the Work of "Agyeya" (translation with Sachchidananda) (University of California, 1971)
- The Likeness: Poems out of India (Thorpe Springs Press, 1975)
- Returning Your Call (Princeton University Press, 1975)
- Teachings of Grandfather Fox (Serendipity Books Distribution, 1976)
- The Transport of Love: Kālidāsa's The Mēghadūa (University of California Press, 1977)
- Dear Blood (University of Pittsburgh Press, 1980)
- Holding Patterns (University of Pittsburgh Press, 1982)
- Songs of Something Else: Poems of Gunnar Eklöf (translation with James Larson) (Princeton University Press, 1982)
- Carrying On: New and Selected Poems (University of Pittsburgh Press, 1985)
- With the Skin: Poems of Aleksander Wat (translation with Czesław Miłosz) (Ecco, 1989)
- The Poet's Work, an Introduction to Czesław Miłosz (Harvard University Press, 1991)
- Talking to My Body: Poems of Anna Swir (translation with Czesław Miłosz) (Copper Canyon Press, 1996)
- Diary of a Left-Handed Birdwatcher (Graywolf Press, 1996)
- Captain of the Butterflies: Poems by Cees Nooteboom (translation with Herlinde Spahr) (Sun and Moon Press, 1997)
- The Potato Eaters (Orchises Press, 1998)
- Grace and Mercy in Her Wild Hair: Poems of Rāmprasād Sen (translation with Clinton Seely) (Hohm Press, 1999)
- Tears of the Old Magician (Orchises Press, 2003)
- Restarting the World (Orchises Press, 2006)
- Ragged Sonnets (Orchises Press, 2008)
