= Anna Świrszczyńska =

Polish poet (1909–1984)

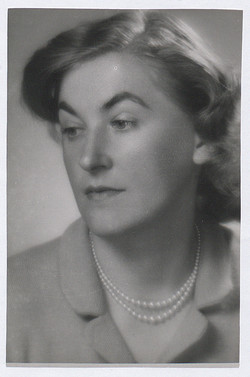
- Born: 1909; Warsaw, Poland
- Died: 1984 (aged 74–75); Kraków, Poland
- Occupation: Poet
- Writing career
- Pen name: Anna Swir
- Notable works: Happy as a Dog's Tail; Talking to My Body; Fat Like the Sun
- Notable awards: Knight's Cross of the Order of Polonia Restituta, 1957 Officer's Cross of the Order of Polonia Restituta, 1975 City of Kraków Award, 1976

Anna Świrszczyńska (Polish pronunciation: [ˈanna ɕvirʂˈt͡ʂɨj̃ska]; also known as Anna Swir) (1909–1984) was a Polish poet whose works deal with themes including her experiences during World War II, motherhood, the female body, and sensuality.

== Biography ==
Świrszczyńska was born in Warsaw and grew up in poverty as the daughter of an artist. She began publishing her poems in the 1930s. During the Nazi occupation of Poland she joined the Polish resistance movement in World War II and was a military nurse during the Warsaw Uprising. She wrote for underground publications and once waited 60 minutes to be executed. Czesław Miłosz writes of knowing her during this time and has translated a volume of her work. Her experiences during the war strongly influenced her poetry. In 1974 she published Building the Barricade, a volume which describes the suffering she witnessed and experienced during that time. She also writes frankly about the female body in various stages of life.

Some of Swir's poems are translated into Nepali by Suman Pokhrel and are collected in an anthology tilled Manpareka Kehi Kavita. Siddheshwar Singh, Manoj Patel and other translators have translated many of her poems into Hindi. Nine of Swir's poems were posthumously published by family, earlier translated in Dutch by Gerard Rasch, in his work Memento in 2005. Hendrik Lindepuu translated a collection of poems by Świrszczyńska into Estonian and published it as a separate book: Anna Świrszczyńska. Ma ehitasin barrikaadi. Halliste: Hendrik Lindepuu Kirjastus, 2019. 187 pages. ISBN 9789949736119.

The Spanish composer Luis de Pablo premiered in 2019 the Cantata femenina Anna Swir (Female Cantata Anna Swir), based on several poems by this author.

== Works ==
You will not tame this sea
either by humility or rapture.
But you can laugh
in its face.

— The Sea and the Man
Translated by Czeslaw Milosz and Leonard Nathan

=== Poetry collections ===
- Wiersze i proza (Poems and Prose) (1936)
- Liryki zebrane (Collected Poems) (1958)
- Czarne słowa (Black Words) (1967)
- Wiatr (Wind) (1970)
- Jestem baba (I am a Woman) (1972)
- Poezje wybrane (Selected Poems) (1973)
- Budowałam barykadę (Building the Barricade) (1974)
- Szczęśliwa jak psi ogon (Happy as a Dog's Tail) (1978)
- Cierpienie i radość (Suffering and Joy) (1985)

=== Collections in English translation ===
- Thirty-four Poems on the Warsaw Uprising (1977), New York. Transl.: Magnus Jan Kryński, Robert A. Maguire.
- Building the Barricade (1979), Kraków. Transl.: Magnus Jan Kryński, Robert A. Maguire.
- Happy as a Dog's Tail (1985), San Diego. Transl.: Czesław Miłosz & Leonard Nathan.
- Fat Like the Sun (1986), London. Transl.: M. Marshment, G. Baran.
- Talking to My Body (Copper Canyon Press, 1996) Transl.: Czesław Miłosz & Leonard Nathan.
- Building the Barricade and Other Poems of Anna Swir Tr. by Piotr Florczyk (Calypso Editions, 2011).
- Building the Barricade (2016), Portland, Oreg. Transl.: Piotr Florczyk.

== See also ==
- Found in Translation Award
