= Calw Hermann Hesse Prize =

German literary award

- Description: Literary prizes awarded in Calw to honor international literary achievement, translation, and scholarship related to Hermann Hesse
- Country: Germany
- Presented by: Hermann Hesse Foundation / International Hermann Hesse Society
- Website: https://www.hermann-hesse.de/en/foundation

The Calw Hermann Hesse Prize is a literary prize awarded since 1990. It is named after the German-Swiss poet, novelist, and painter Hermann Hesse. Alternating every year since 2017, the International Hermann Hesse Prize of the Foundation (awarded by the Hermann Hesse Foundation, worth: €15,000) and the Hermann Hesse Prize of the International Hermann Hesse Society (worth: €10,000) are awarded in Calw. The first prize is awarded for "a literary achievement of international standing in connection with its translation". The latter is intended to promote the examination of the work of the poet, who was born in Calw in 1877. In 2017, the first recipient was Adolf Muschg.

== Recipients ==
- 1990 literary magazine: "Verwendung" – editor Egmont Hesse, Berlin
- 1992 translator: Solomon Apt, Moscow
- 1994 literary magazine: "Schreibheft" – editor Norbert Wehr, Essen
- 1996 translator: Trond Winje, Norway
- 1998 literary magazine: "Am Erker" – editors Joachim Feldmann, Rudolf Gier, Michael Kofort, Münster
- 2000 translator: Jean Malaplate, France
- 2002 literary magazine: "EDIT", Leipzig
- 2004 translator: Juan José del Solar Bardelli, Peru
- 2006 literary magazine: "Sprache im technischen Zeitalter" – editor Joachim Neuß
- 2008 translator: Małgorzata Łukasiewicz, Poland
- 2010 literary magazine: POET, Leipzig
- 2012 translator: Susan Bernofsky, US
- 2014 Nicholson Baker (US) and his translator Eike Schönfeld (Germany) (International Hermann Hesse Prize)
- 2014 Honorary Award: Volker Michels
- 2016 Luiz Ruffato (Brazil) and his translator Michael Kegler (Germany) (International Hermann Hesse Prize)

- 2017 Adolf Muschg (Hermann Hesse Prize of the International Hermann Hesse Society)
- 2018 Joanna Bator (Poland) and her translator Esther Kinsky (Germany) (International Hermann Hesse Prize)
- 2019 Eugen Drewermann (Hermann Hesse Prize of the International Hermann Hesse Society)
- 2020 Chimamanda Ngozi Adichie (Nigeria and US) and her translator Judith Schwaab (Germany) (International Hermann Hesse Prize)
- 2021 Bärbel Reetz (Hermann Hesse Prize of the International Hermann Hesse Society)
- 2022 Hakan Günday and Sabine Adatepe
- 2024 Sofia Andrukhovych – Alexander Kratochvil, Maria Weissenböck
- 2026 Laurent Mauvignier – Claudia Kalscheuer
