= Olga Stanisławska =

Polish writer and freelance journalist

Olga Stanisławska is a Polish writer and freelance journalist who has studied American literature in Warsaw and Aix-en-Provence. She has lived in Paris since 2001.

She has worked with the newspapers Gazeta Wyborcza and Tygodnik Powszechny for a long time. Her two solo travels to Africa in 1994-1996 resulted in two series of reportages and a book, De Gaulle Roundabout (2001), which was awarded the literary award of the Fundacja Koscielskich. The book, born from a year-long trip between Casablanca and Kinshasa, attempted to capture local voices, combining political reportage, travel writing and essay. It addressed the heavy burden of clichés present in Western literature, philosophy and art history (Joseph Conrad, Carl Jung, Julien Green André Gide, Louis-Ferdinand Céline, Karen Blixen, André Malraux...), where Africa is nowhere to be seen, replaced with the Western projections of the childhood of humanity and the repressed, dark part of the human psyche.

In 1996-97, after the Bosnian War, she lived for a year in Sarajevo, writing about Bosnian Jews and the resurgence of religions. Since 1999 she has been travelling to the Middle East, following the routes of the Crusades, but investigating mainly present-day collective identities – national, ethnic, religious – from Clermont to Cairo and back to the suburbs of Paris. She concentrates on minority issues and various strategies of dealing with the Other both within a society and outside it. Her interest in multi-ethnic environments springs from the feeling of an amputated memory and aims ultimately at a more intimate understanding of mechanisms at work in the heterogeneous society of the pre-war Poland.

She has also organised a series of events devoted to Polish visions of Africa and the African as the symbolic Other, curated an exhibition illustrating the evolution of European images of Africa over the last century through the work of five Polish photographers, and co-curated another exhibition analysing the ideas underlying the powerful nostalgic vision of Kazimierz Zagorski's series Vanishing Africa (1924–44). In 2006 she made a documentary film about Muslims in France for the Polish Television.
