= Artur Domosławski =

Polish journalist and writer

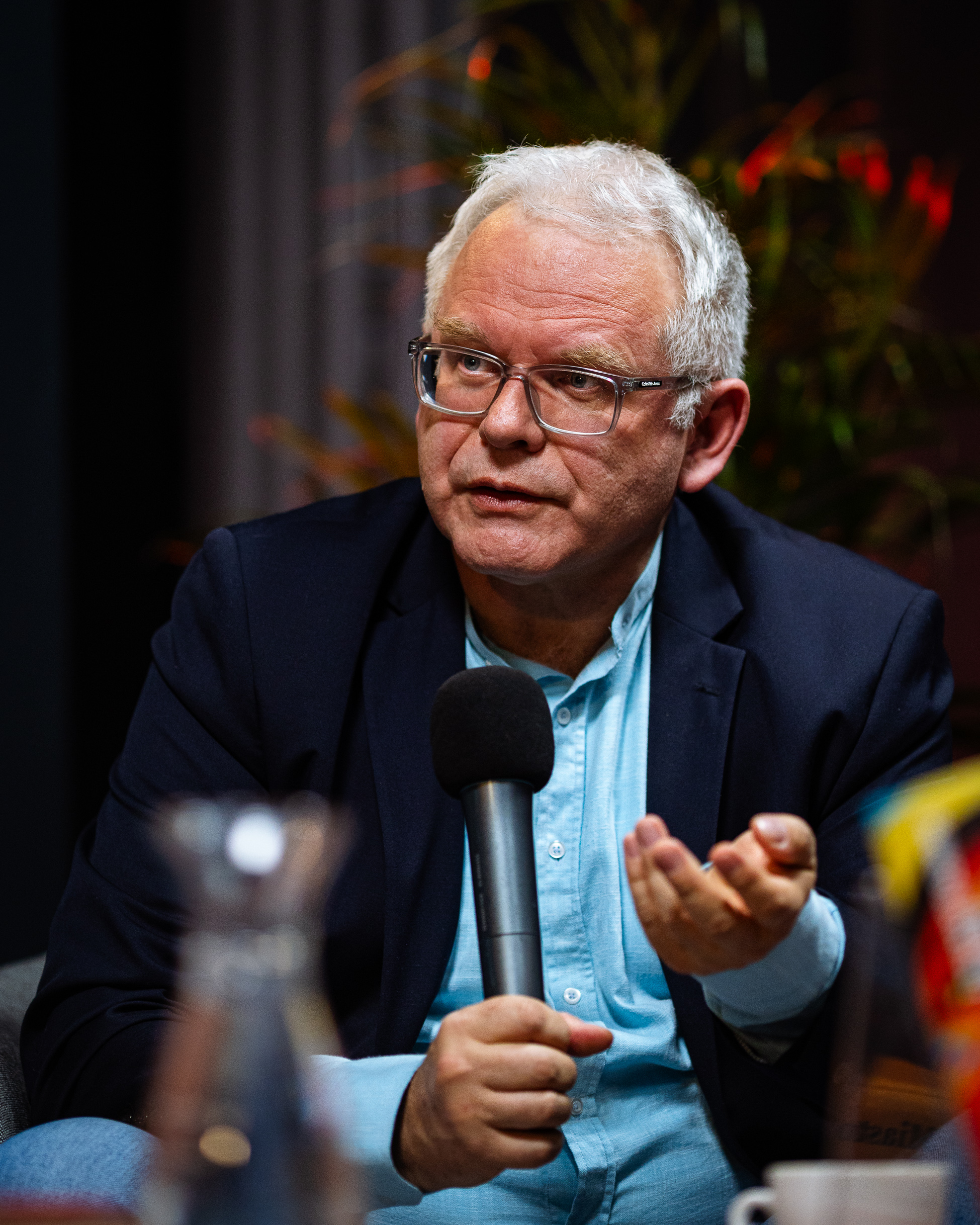
- Artur Domosławski (2025)
- Born: 1967 (age 58–59)
- Education: Aleksander Zelwerowicz National Academy of Dramatic Art in Warsaw
- Occupation: journalist
- Employer(s): Gazeta Wyborcza (1991–2011), Polityka (since 2011)

Artur Domosławski (born 1967) is a Polish journalist and writer.

== Life ==
Artur Domosławski graduated from the Theatre Studies Department at the Aleksander Zelwerowicz National Academy of Dramatic Art in Warsaw. Between 1991 and 2011, he worked as a journalist for the daily Gazeta Wyborcza. Since 2011, he has written for the weekly Polityka, and also for the Polish edition of the monthly Le Monde diplomatique.

As a writer Domosławski covers mostly topics related to Latin America, devoting two books to it: Latin American Fever (Gorączka latynoamerykańska, 2004) and Death in Amazonia (Śmierć w Amazonii, 2013). He has also covered the alter-globalization movement and North-South relations in The World is Not For Sale (Świat nie na sprzedaż, Rozmowy o globalizacji i kontestacji, 2002) and Rebellious America: Seventeen Dialogues on the Dark Sides of the Freedom Empire (Ameryka zbuntowana. Siedemnaście dialogów o ciemnych stronach imperium wolności). In his books, Domosławski exposes economic and political links by which Western countries inflict on the global South.

In 2010, Domosławski became widely recognised thanks to his biography of Ryszard Kapuściński titled Kapuściński non-fiction, which presented Kapuściński without omitting both positive and negative aspects of his work and details of personal life. Kapuściński's widow, Alicja Kapuścińska, sought an injunction against Domosławski's book, claiming defamation and invasion of privacy. The injunction was rejected by the Polish court on the grounds that she had chosen to give Domosławski access to her husband's archive. In an interview with The Guardian Domosławski said: "Kapuściński was experimenting in journalism. He wasn't aware he had crossed the line between journalism and literature. I still think his books are wonderful and precious. But ultimately, they belong to fiction." Domosławski's monograph was translated to English in 2012 by Antonia Lloyd-Jones and first published by Verso Books as Ryszard Kapuściński. A Life in 2012. Lloyd-Jones's translation received the 2013 Found in Translation Award. The book was also translated into French, Spanish, Hungarian, Dutch, and Italian, among others.

Domosławski received the Journalist of the Year Award from Press magazine (2010) and the 2008 Beata Pawlak Award. In 2017, he was nominated for the Nike Award.

== Works ==
- Chrystus bez karabinu: o pontyfikacie Jana Pawła [Christ Without a Rifle: On the Pontificate of John Paul II], Warszawa: Prószyński i S-ka, 1999.
- Świat nie na sprzedaż: rozmowy o globalizacji i kontestacji [The World is Not For Sale], Warszawa: Sic!, Gazeta Wyborcza, 2002.
- Gorączka latynoamerykańska [Latin American Fever], Warszawa: Świat Książki, 2004.
- Ameryka zbuntowana. Siedemnaście dialogów o ciemnych stronach imperium wolności [Rebellious America], Warszawa: Świat Książki, 2007.
- Kapuściński non-fiction [Ryszard Kapuściński: A Life], Warszawa: Świat Książki, 2010.
- Śmierć w Amazonii [Death in Amazonia], Warszawa: Wielka Litera, 2013.
- Wykluczeni, Warszawa: Wielka Litera, 2016.
