= Jacek Hugo-Bader =

Polish reporter and journalist

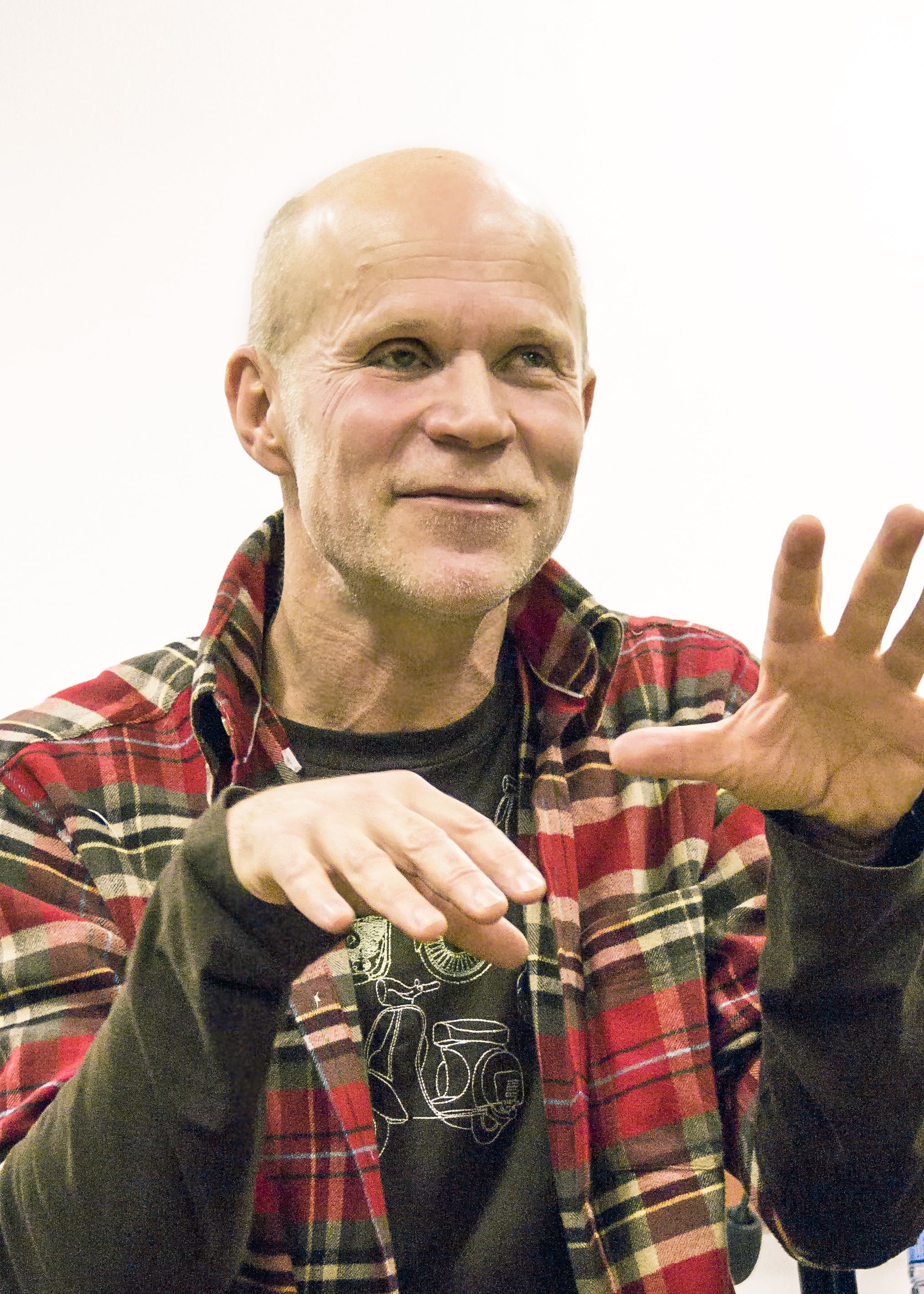
Jacek Hugo-Bader in 2010

Jacek Aleksander Hugo-Bader (born 9 March 1957 in Sochaczew) is a Polish journalist and journalist who mainly reports on matters related to Russia and former Soviet Republics. Since 1990 he has worked for the Gazeta Wyborcza newspaper.

== Life and career ==
He also used to work as a teacher, train loader, scale operator at a pig market, head of a distribution company, a part of the underground structure of Solidarity and a shopkeeper.

He travelled by bike through Central Asia, the Gobi Desert and China, and sailed through Lake Baikal in a canoe. In winter 2007 he made a lonely car journey from Moscow to Vladivostok which was the background of his first book White Fever: A Journey to the Frozen Heart of Siberia.

In 2011 he made a solitary hitchhike across Russia – from Magadan to Yakutsk. Reports describing encountered people's everyday lives were published in Gazeta Wyborcza during the journey and later gathered and released in the book Kolyma Diaries: A Journey into Russia's Haunted Hinterland.

He is a two-time laureate of Polish prize for the best journalists - Grand Press (in 1999 and 2003). Most of his works are about Russia: "(...) he describes the imperium from prospect of loitering dog, grasps mechanisms of thinking, behaviour, processes and a rat by its tail it addition."

The journalist appeared in blackface at a Polish Independence Day celebration on November 11, 2016, as part of a reporting project on street reactions to a black person.

== Books ==
- White Fever: A Journey to the Frozen Heart of Siberia (pol. Biała gorączka) (2009)
- (pol.) W rajskiej dolinie wśród zielska (2002)
- Kolyma Diaries: A Journey into Russia's Haunted Hinterland (pol. Dzienniki kołymskie) (2011)
- (pol.) Chłopcy z motylkami (2013)
- (pol.) Długi film o miłości. Powrót na Broad Peak (2014)
- (pol.) Skucha (2016)

== Films ==
- Jacek Hugo-Bader. Korespondent z Polszy (2007)
- Jak to się robi by Marcel Łoziński (2006)
- Zamek - series Nasz spis powszechny (2002)
- Ślad po meduzie (1998)
