= Skin Hunters =

Polish casualty workers convicted of killing patients

The "Skin Hunters" (Polish: Łowcy skór) is the media nickname for hospital casualty workers from the Polish city of Łódź responsible for murdering at least five elderly patients and then selling information regarding their deaths to competing funeral homes. While only four people were convicted, almost every casualty worker was involved in selling information and it is claimed that many more were killing patients (either directly or by slowing down the response/not doing due diligence). The price of the bribes paid to the killers was billed to the family of the deceased as an additional funeral charge.

The main perpetrators were arrested in 2002 and sentenced in 2007. Their descriptive designation was coined by investigative journalists writing for Gazeta Wyborcza, which first brought the story to the public's attention. It has been described as one of the "most macabre cases in Polish legal history".

== Case ==
On January 20, 2007, four employees from a hospital casualty department in Łódź were sentenced. The perpetrators were shown to have killed mostly elderly patients using the muscle relaxant pancuronium (brand name Pavulon). The four workers then sold information about the deceased patients to funeral homes, so they could contact the relatives before other funeral homes could. They exacted bribes ranging from 12,000 to over 70,000 złoty.

The killers are:

- Paramedic Andrzej Nowocień was sentenced to life in prison for the murder of four patients and for helping Karol Banaś in a further murder. He confessed to more than 50 murders to a cellmate.
- Paramedic Karol Banaś was sentenced to 25 years imprisonment for the "particularly cruel" (szczególnie okrutne) murder of Ludmiła Ś. and for helping Andrzej Nowocień murder the other patients.
- Doctor Janusz Kuliński was sentenced to six years and banned from practising medicine for 10 years, for willfully endangering 10 patients.
- Doctor Paweł Wasilewski was sentenced to five years and banned from practising medicine for 10 years for the willful endangering of four patients.

Their sentences were upheld by the Łódź Appeal Court in June 2008. Further appeal was rejected by the Supreme Court of Poland on October 27, 2009.

The investigation into the scandal is still ongoing and a total of forty other members of the casualty department are under investigation, as are the owners of a local funeral home for receiving information regarding the deaths of patients. The funeral home added the cost of the bribes it paid to the killers to the bills that the families of the deceased paid for their funerals.

== Discovery ==
The scandal was first brought to public attention on January 23, 2002, in an article in the Polish newspaper Gazeta Wyborcza by Tomasz Patora, Marcin Stelmasiak and Przemysław Witkowski. They described how the hospital workers or paramedics would call funeral homes regarding patient deaths in order to receive a bribe, and sometimes even killed patients. The dead patients were called "skins" and so the article was called "Skin Hunters". Łowcy skór). The man who originally told the journalists about this case is a well-known head of a local undertaker emporium named Witold Skrzydlewski, who was despite originally helping the journalist's investigation accused of starting and expanding the system. He was the main figure in the documentary "Necrobusiness". His company still has a stronghold in Polish undertaking business.

== In popular culture ==
In 2003, a film Skin Hunters (Łowcy skór) was made of the case starring Piotr Adamczyk. In 2008, a documentary of the events, Necrobusiness, was made by a Swedish company. In 2024, a documentary series, Skin Hunters, was made.

The Swedish novelist Arne Dahl also used the events as an inspiration in his book A Midsummer Night's Dream (2003)

== See also ==
- List of serial killers by country
