= Żanna Słoniowska =

Polish novelist and journalist

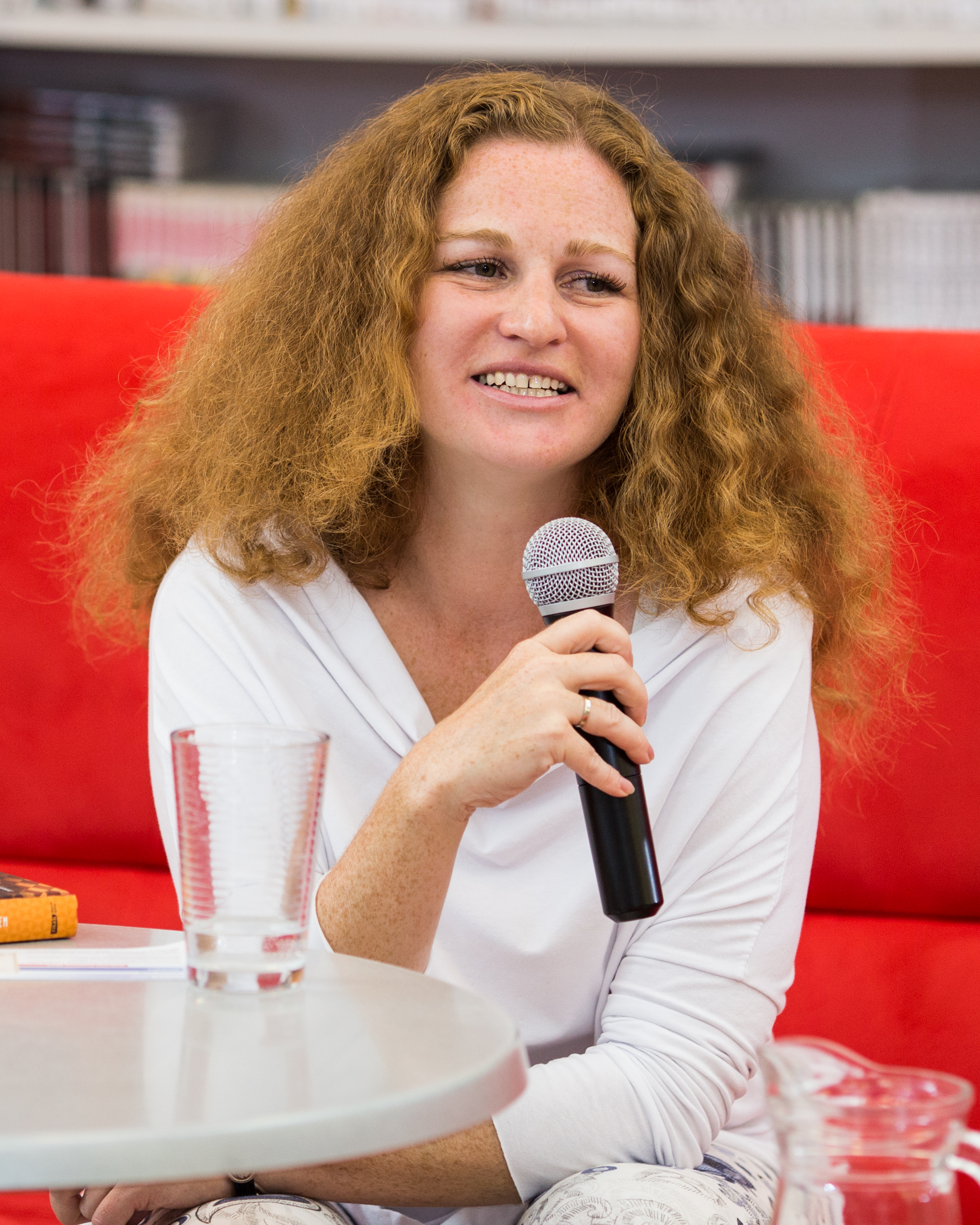
- Słoniowska in 2016
- Born: 1978 (age 47–48); Lviv, Ukraine
- Occupation: novelist
- Writing career
- Period: 2000s–present
- Notable work: The House with the Stained-Glass Window

Żanna Słoniowska (Ukrainian: Жанна Слоньовська; born 1978) is a Polish novelist and journalist. She was the first winner of the Znak literary prize for her novel The House with the Stained-Glass Window and a Conrad Prize winner.

== Biography ==
Słoniowska was born in Lviv in 1978, in a family with Polish antecedents. She attended the Ukrainian Academy of Printing, following which she worked as a journalist for the television channel NTA.

In 2002, she moved to Poland. She began doctoral studies in Warsaw's University of Social Sciences and Humanities. After her marriage, she moved to Kraków.

In 2013, she published a historical work The most beautiful photographs of pre-war Lviv, illustrated with fine photographs. The following year, her debut novel The House with the Stained-Glass Window (Polish: Dom z Witrażem) was published.

== Awards and recognition ==
The House with the Stained-Glass Window

- Znak publishing house's prize for best novel
- Conrad prize for new writers,
- Shortlisted for the Nike Award in 2016.

== Reception ==
For The House with the Stained-Glass Window

A reviewer in Polityka said that "the grandeur of the book is impressive - through a small family saga it depicts the history of Ukraine over the last hundred years". Another called it "a tale saturated with vivid colors, paintings, dreamy moments, ... it is, above all, a moving and insightful saga about women, entangled in history."

== Selected works ==
- Przedwojenny Lwów. Najpiękniejsze fotografie [The most beautiful photographs of pre-war Lviv]. RM. 2013. ISBN 978-83-7773-053-9.
- Dom z witrażem [The House with the Stained-Glass Window]. Translated by Lloyd-Jones, Antonia. London: MacLehose. 2017. ISBN 978-0857057136.
