= Paweł Huelle =

Polish writer (1957–2023)

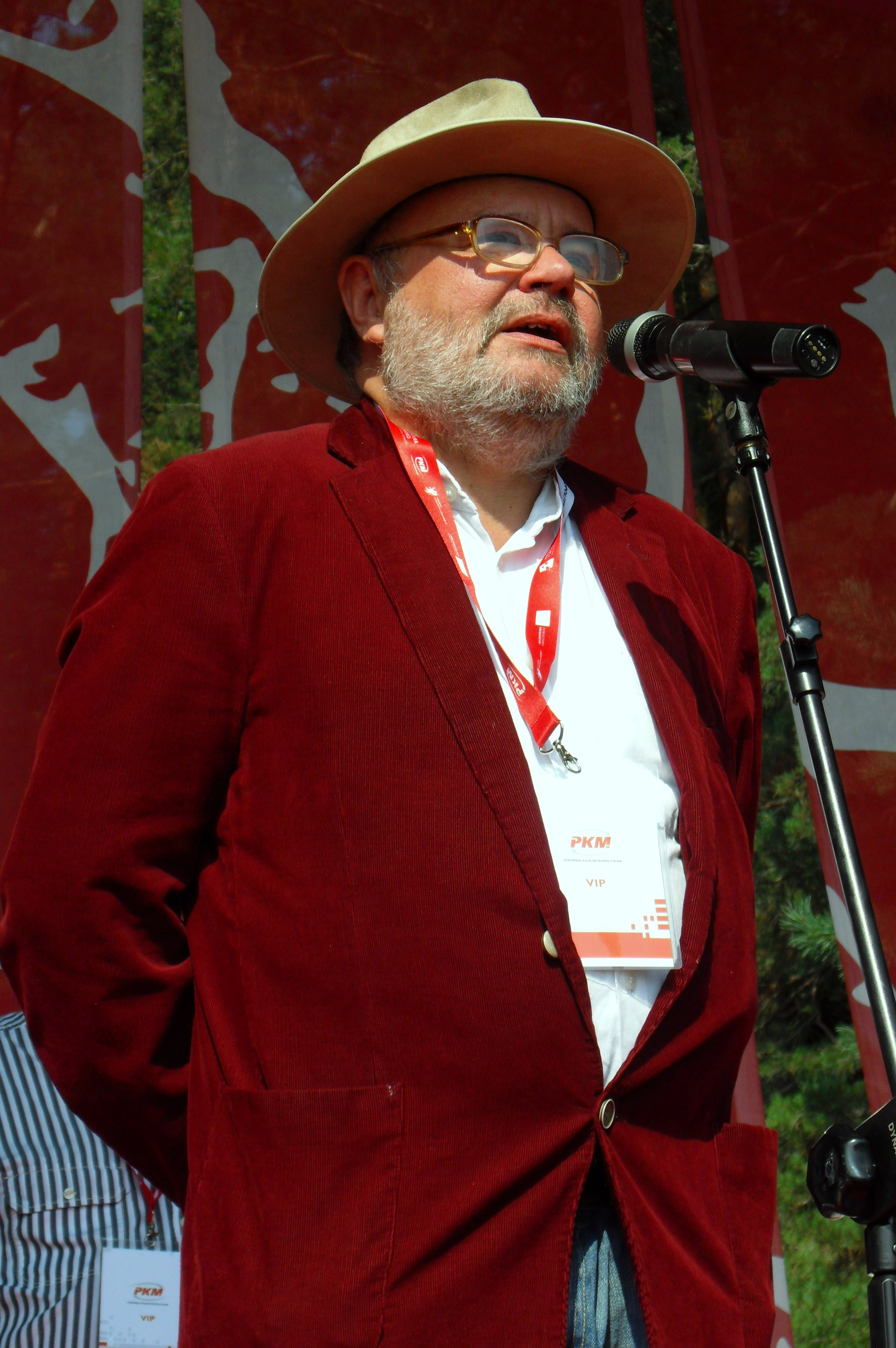
- Huelle in 2014
- Born: 10 September 1957; Gdańsk, Poland
- Died: 27 November 2023 (aged 66); Gdańsk, Poland
- Education: University of Gdańsk
- Occupation: Novelist
- Known for: Weiser Dawidek (1987); Ostatnia wieczerza (2007)
- Spouse: Ida Łotocka-Huelle
- Awards: Paszport Polityki (2001)
- Honours: Order of Polonia Restituta (2012); Medal for Merit to Culture – Gloria Artis (2014)

Paweł Marek Huelle (10 September 1957 – 27 November 2023) was a Polish prose writer.

== Life and career ==
Huelle studied Polish philology at Gdańsk University and, in 1980, participated in the efforts to establish an independent student organization. He later became a journalist and worked for the press service of Solidarność (Solidarity). After the declaration of martial law in 1981, he cooperated with the samizdat movement. He also taught literature, philosophy and history. He was the director of TVP3 Gdańsk from 1994 to 1999 and served as the literary manager for the Municipal Theater of Gdynia.

His literary debut came in 1987 with a novel Weiser Dawidek (translated as Who was David Weiser?), which was made into a film (Weiser) by Wojciech Marczewski in 2000. He was also a member of the Polish PEN Club.

In 2001, he won the Paszport Polityki Award for his book Mercedes-Benz. Z listów do Hrabala, and in 2008 was nominated for the Nike Award for his novel Ostatnia wieczerza ("The Last Supper").

In 2012, he was awarded the Officer's Cross of the Order of Polonia Restituta by President Bronisław Komorowski. In 2014, he received the Silver Medal for Merit to Culture – Gloria Artis.

His wife was painter Ida Łotocka-Huelle.

Huelle died in Gdańsk on 27 November 2023, at the age of 66.

== Bibliography ==
- Weiser Dawidek (1987)
- Opowiadania na czas przeprowadzki (1991) (trans. Moving House and Other Stories Bloomsbury 1994)
- Wiersze (1994)
- Pierwsza miłość i inne opowiadania (1996) (trans. "The first love and other stories")
- Mercedes-Benz. Z listów do Hrabala. (2001) (trans. Mercedes Benz Serpent's Tail 2005)
- Hans Castorp w Sopocie. Zaginiony rozdział z 'Czarodziejskiej Góry' (2002) (trans. Castorp Serpent's Tail 2007)
- Byłem samotny i szczęśliwy (2002) (trans. "I was lonely and happy")
- Ostatnia Wieczerza (2007) (trans. The Last Supper Serpent's Tail 2008)
- The Gift of Freedom, short essay, English, June 2009

Works in Translation

- Who Was David Weiser? Bloomsbury 1991 ISBN 978-0-7475-2346-8
- Castorp Serpent's Tail 2007, ISBN 978-1-85242-945-4
- Mercedes-Benz Serpent's Tail 2005, ISBN 978-1-85242-869-3
- The Last Supper Serpent's Tail 2008, ISBN 978-1-85242-980-5
- Moving House and Other Stories Bloomsbury 1996, ISBN 978-0-7475-2244-7
- Cold Sea Stories Comma Press 2012, ISBN 978-1-9055-8339-3
