= Wojciech Jagielski =

Polish journalist and author (born 1960)

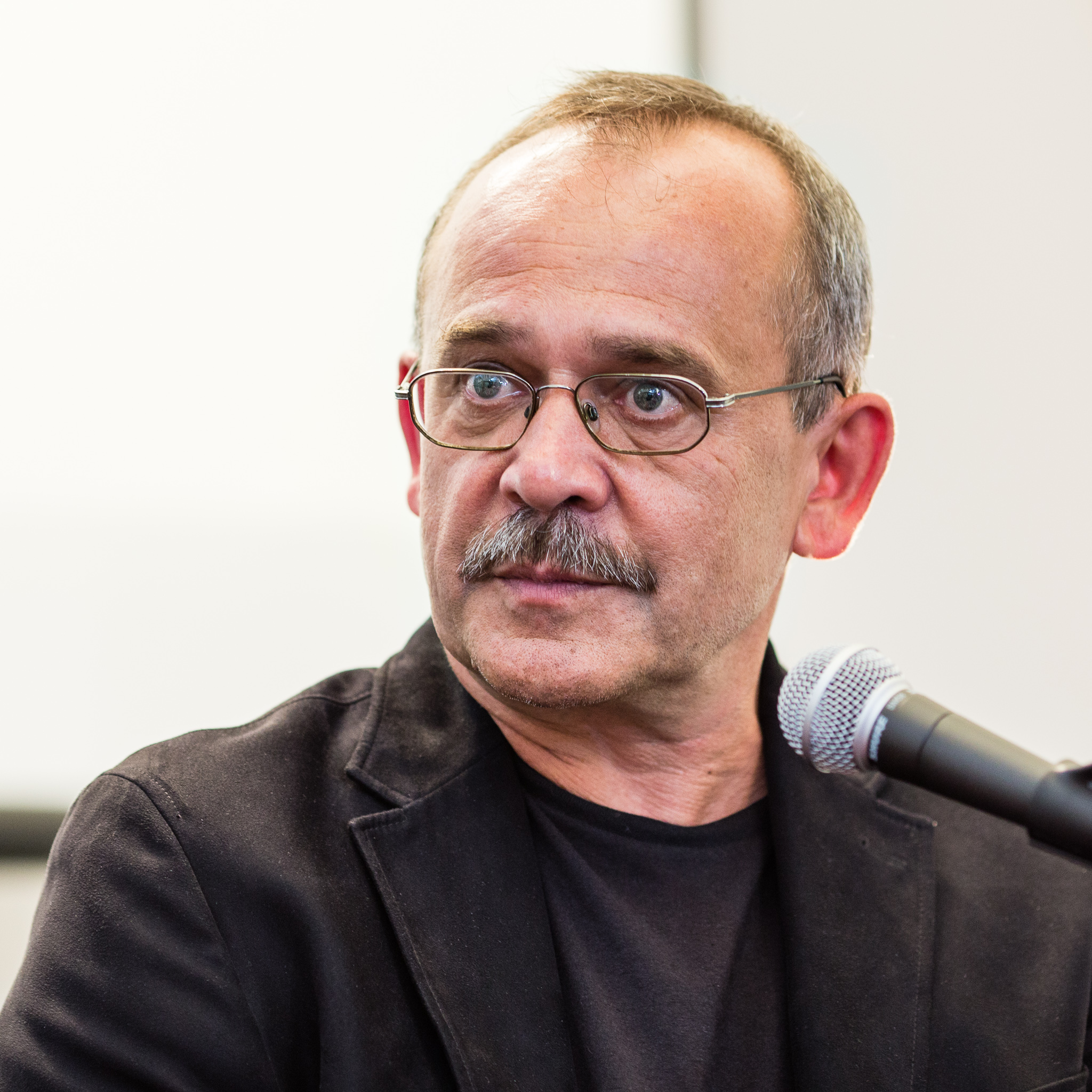
Wojciech Jagielski

Wojciech Jagielski (born 12 September 1960) is a Polish journalist and author. He has won acclaim for his reportage from conflict zones in the Transcaucasus, the Caucasus, Central Asia and Africa. He worked for Gazeta Wyborcza from 1991 to 2012, in addition to contributing to the BBC and Le Monde. He has written several books, including Towers of Stone, winner of the Italian Literatura Frontera Award. His book All Lara's Wars, was published in English by Seven Stories Press in 2020.

== Life ==
Jagielski graduated from a Warsaw high school named after Wladyslaw IV. He earned a degree from the Faculty of Political Science at Warsaw University. He studied political science, but when the declaration of martial law in Poland in 1981 introduced the obligation to attend all classes, he chose individual programs and took up African studies.

After graduation he briefly worked in television, then from December 1986 for the Polish Press Agency. He wanted to report on Africa, but the station managers were not too interested in this topic. From then, he decided that the Caucasus would become his second specialization. In 1991 he moved to the Gazeta Wyborcza, for which he wrote until the end of March 2012. He has also published several well-received books. He lives in Zalesie near Warsaw.

== Books ==
In 1994, Jagielski published A Good Place to Die (Dobre miejsce do umierania) about his years travelling through the Caucasus and Transcaucasian regions during the fall of the Soviet Empire and the creation of new independent countries.

Pray for the Rain (Modlitwa o deszcz), Jagielski's collection of writings about Afghanistan, was published in 2002. The result of eleven trips to Afghanistan between the spring of 1992 and the autumn of 2001, Pray for the Rain chronicles the bloody rise and fall of regimes in the region. Featuring well-known figures such as Osama bin Laden, Ahmad Shah Massoud, Gulbuddin Hekmatyar, Mullah Omar and Najibullah Zazi, the book was nominated for the NIKE Award 2003 and received an Amber Butterfly in the Arkady Fiedler Competition and the Józef Tischner Award.

In 2004, Jagielski published Towers of Stone: The Battle of Wills in Chechnya (Wieże z kamienia). It was translated into English by Soren A. Gauger and published by Seven Stories Press in 2009. The winner of the 2009 Letterature Dal Fronte, Jagielski presents the bitter story of war in Chechnya and the conflict between groups of warriors with their leaders: Shamil Basayev and Aslan Maskhadov, against the powerful Russian army.

Jagielski's next book to appear in English, The Night Wanderers: Uganda's Children and the Lord's Resistance Army (Nocni wędrowcy), was published by Seven Stories Press in 2012. The book chronicles the plight of child soldiers in Uganda as they flee the aggressive reach of the Lord's Resistance Army (LRA) and their brutal leader Joseph Kony.

In 2015, Seven Stories Press published Burning the Grass: At the Heart of Change in South Africa 1990-2011, which examines the 2010 murder of South African white supremacist and leader of the far-right political party Afrikaner Weerstandsbeweging, Eugène Terre'Blanche.

Jagielski's latest book to appear in English, All Lara's Wars, which studies the influence of the radical Islamic freedom fighters who had come to Georgia as refugees from the First and Second Chechen Wars, was published in 2020 by Seven Stories Press. The book focuses on the plight of a Chechen-Georgian woman as she travels to Syria to bring her radicalized son home.

== Honors and awards ==
- 2009: in recognition of his valuable and bold reporting of international issues, Radosław Sikorski, Minister of Foreign Affairs, awarded him with the Bene Merito honorary distinction.
- Polish Journalists Association (SDP) Awards (1996)
- The Ksawery Pruszyński Award of Polish PEN Club (1996)
- The Warsaw Literary Premiere Award (2002)
- Dariusz Fikus Award (2002)
- Józef Tischner Award (2003)
- Amber Butterfly in Arkady Fiedler Competition (2003)
- MediaTory Student Journalist Award (2008)
- Literatura Frontera Award (2009)
