= Hendrik Lindepuu =

Estonian translator, poet, and playwright

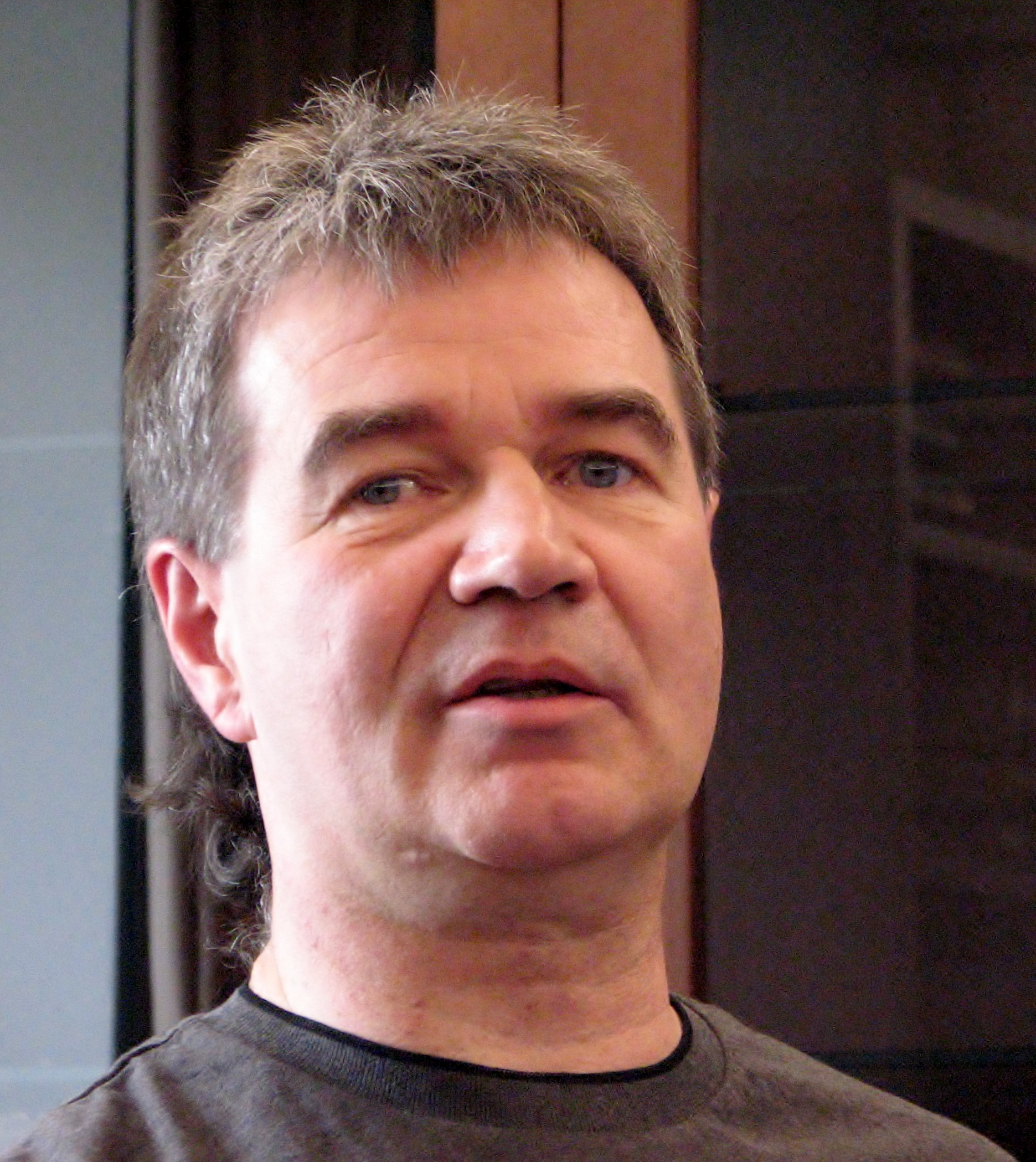
Hendrik Lindepuu

Hendrik Lindepuu (born 11 November 1958 in Mõisaküla) is an Estonian translator, poet, and playwright. He has translated mainly from the Polish language.

Lindepuu graduated from high school and began teaching himself Polish from a textbook in 1984. After three years of study, he began publishing translations from Polish into Estonian.

He established his own publishing house, Hendrik Lindepuu Kirjastus, in 2002, due to a lack of interest in translated Polish literature among larger Estonian publishing companies. Since 2003, the publishing house has published over 50 books, including works by Czesław Miłosz, Olga Tokarczuk, and Adam Zagajewski.

== Awards ==
- 2005: Cross of Merit (Poland)
- 2009 and 2014: Estonian State Cultural Prize
- 2009: Order of Merit of the Republic of Poland
- 2019: Transatlantyk Award

== Selected works ==
- "Ei haise ega lõhna" (2002; poetry collection)
- "Haisevad ja lõhnavad. Memmed ja taadid. Slavoween" (2002, plays)

== Translations ==
- Małgorzata Semil, Elżbieta Wysińska, "Tänapäeva teatri leksikon" (with addings by translator). SE & JS, Tallinn 1996, 422 pp
- Stanisław Ignacy Witkiewicz, "Näidendid". Eesti Draamateater 1997, 288 pp
