= Stefan Batory Foundation =

Polish non-government organization

- Formation: 1988
- Type: Non-profit NGO
- Purpose: Human rights, activism
- Location: ul. Sapieżyńska 10a 00-215 Warsaw Poland
- Region served: Poland
- Product: non profit human rights advocacy
- Website: https://www.batory.org.pl/

The Stefan Batory Foundation (Polish: Fundacja im. Stefana Batorego) is an independent Polish non-government organization established by American financier and philanthropist, George Soros, along with a group of Polish opposition leaders of 1980s, and registered in Poland since May 1988. It is named after Stephen Báthory, the 16th-century Polish king. The foundation's mission is to support the development of an open, democratic society in Poland along with other Central and East European countries.

Foundation's activity is financed from income on endowment and grants from foreign institutions, from gifts of individual donors and 1% personal income tax designations.

== History and beginnings ==
The Batory Foundation was founded in 1988 when the communist system in Central Europe was disintegrating. It was established by an American philanthropist of Hungarian extraction, George Soros, and Polish democratic opposition leaders of the 1980s. The mission of the foundation was to contribute to the preparation of Polish society in the transition from communism to democracy, civil society and a market economy.

Early on, the Batory Foundation invested in the preparation of cadres for the market economy and democratic system taking roots in Poland by funding hundreds of scholarships and travel grants for economists, bankers, physicians, teachers, and local government activists. It also made a significant contribution to the various reforms being implemented in the country after the collapse of communism, supporting the reform of local government, public administration, and social welfare policy. These reform-related initiatives eventually gave rise to the Institute of Public Affairs, a major think-tank in Warsaw, which the foundation helped to establish in 1995.

The foundation disbursed hundreds of micro-grants to a variety of local civic initiatives, contributing to the establishment of numerous local organizations.

Until 2007, the Stefan Batory Foundation has spent US$95.9 million on all its programs, US$71 million of which were assigned for grantmaking. Throughout 2007, the foundation provided 513 grants to institutions and organizations, 47 travel grants to cover costs of 169 participants attending events and projects abroad, as well as 5 awards; overall expenditure for grantmaking and operational activities in 2007 totaled EUR 4,9 million.

In January 2026, the Stefan Batory Foundation was declared an undesirable organization in Russia.

== Priorities of the Foundation ==
In 2016, the foundation ran three grantmaking, and five operational programs.

=== Grantmaking programs ===
- Citizens for Democracy – the aim of the Programme, planned for 2013-2016 is to strengthen civil society development and enhance the contribution of non-governmental organizations. The programme has a budget of EUR 37 million, financed from the Financial Mechanism of European Economic Area (the EEA Grants).
- Equal Opportunities – a local scholarship system for secondary school students run by the foundation since 2000.
- For Belarus – the program's objective is to support civic initiatives and preparing for democratic changes in Belarus.

=== Operational programs ===
- Batory Foundation Debates
- Your Vote, Your Choice – the program's goal is to increase public interest in local affairs and to encourage civic participation in public life, including participation in local and parliamentary elections.
- Public Integrity (prev. Anti-Corruption Program) – the goal of the program is to increase transparency and integrity in public life and to promote open, accountable governance.
- Open Europe
- Regional Drug and Alcohol Program – the aim of the program is to transfer the Polish experience in fighting alcohol, drug and other additions to Eastern European and Central Asian countries

Apart from running its own grantmaking programs, the foundation also administers funds entrusted by companies and individuals. The donors advised funds are created on the basis of donation agreements between a company or an individual donor and the foundation.

== The Council ==
Chair of Batory Council is Marcin Król, historian of ideas, head of Department of the History of Ideas and Cultural Anthropology, University of Warsaw. Members include: Jan Krzysztof Bielecki – economist, former Prime Minister of Poland, at present Chairman of the Partners Board at EY Poland; Bogdan Borusewicz – historian, vice-Marshal of the Senate; Agnieszka Holland – director, screenwriter, President of Polish Film Academy; Olga Krzyżanowska – MD, physician; Helena Łuczywo – editor, co-founder of Agora SA; Andrzej Olechowski – economist, Vice Chairman of the Supervisory Board of the City Handlowy Bank, former Minister of Foreign Affairs; Prof. Andrzej Rapaczyński – lawyer, Columbia University, USA; Henryk Woźniakowski – President of Znak Publishers

Among members of the Council there were also the late: Jerzy Turowicz (Chair of the Council, 1991–1999), Anna Radziwiłł (Chair of the Council, 1999–2009), Prof. Bronisław Geremek, Prof. Leszek Kołakowski, Prof. Krzysztof Michalski and Prof. Fr. Józef Tischner.

=== The Board ===
Chair of Batory Board of Directors is Aleksander Smolar, political scientist. Members include: Mikołaj Cześnik – sociologist and political scientist, Institute of Social Sciences (SWPS University of Social Sciences and Humanities).; Anna Materska-Sosnowska – political scientist, Institute of Political Science (University of Warsaw).

== Finances ==
The budget is published in the Annual Report, together with a list of grants awarded and projects implemented throughout the year. The work of the Batory Foundation is funded by donations of Polish and foreign private and public institutions, commercial organizations and individual donors, including taxpayers who donate 1% of their personal income tax.

The organization’s largest donor is the Foundation to Promote Open Society, associated with the Open Society Foundations founded by billionaire philanthropist George Soros. It contributes 6.3 million zlotys annually. The second-largest donor is the European Commission, which contributes just under 6 million zlotys each year.

Over the first 25 years of the foundation's existence, it spent more than 400 million zlotys on projects it implemented itself, as well as on projects carried out by other nongovernmental organizations (to which it allocated funds).

== Controversies ==
In 2017, the Ordo Iuris Institute published a report stating that, when distributing grants under a €37 million programme funded by Iceland, Norway, and Liechtenstein in Poland, the Foundation had allocated more than half of its funds to organizations based in Warsaw, while applications from other regions were approved less frequently. Ordo Iuris submitted an official request asking for details on exactly how the funds were allocated. The Foundation did not provide the requested information, arguing that the Norwegian grants did not constitute public funds, and Ordo Iuris sued the Foundation. On November 13, 2020, the Warsaw Provincial Administrative Court agreed with Ordo Iuris’s position regarding access to public information and ordered the Foundation to consider its request.
