= Gazeta Wyborcza =

Polish daily newspaper

- Nie ma wolności bez solidarności ("There Is No Freedom without Solidarity")
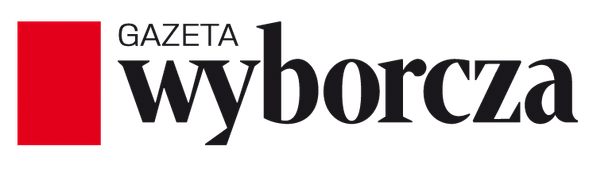

- Front page of the newspaper on 9 September 2025
- Type: Daily newspaper
- Format: Compact
- Founders: Adam Michnik; Helena Łuczywo; Piotr Niemczycki; Juliusz Rawicz; Ernest Skalski
- Publisher: Agora
- Editor-in-chief: Adam Michnik
- Deputy editor: Jarosław Kurski
- Associate editor: Mikołaj Chrzan; Roman Imielski; Aleksandra Sobczak; Piotr Stasiński; Bartosz T. Wieliński
- Managing editor: Wojciech Bartkowiak
- Founded: 8 May 1989; 37 years ago
- Political alignment: Liberal
- Language: Polish
- Headquarters: Warsaw
- City: Warsaw
- Country: Poland
- Circulation: 26,814 (Print, June 2025); 896 (Digital, 2025)
- ISSN: 0860-908X
- Website: wyborcza.pl

Gazeta Wyborcza (Polish pronunciation: [ɡaˈzɛta vɨˈbɔrtʂa]; The Electoral Gazette in English) is a Polish nationwide daily newspaper based in Warsaw, Poland. It was launched on 8 May 1989 on the basis of the Polish Round Table Agreement and as a press organ of the trade union Solidarity in the election campaign before the Contract Sejm. Initially created to cover Poland's first partially free parliamentary elections since the Second Polish Republic, it rapidly grew into a major publication, reaching a circulation of over 500,000 copies at its peak in the 1990s.

It is published by Agora, with its original editor-in-chief Adam Michnik, appointed by Lech Wałęsa, Gazeta Wyborcza is one of Poland's newspapers of record, covering the gamut of political, international and general news from a left-liberal perspective. Gazeta Wyborcza also publishes thematic supplements addressing topics such as economy, law, education, and health, including Duży Format, Co Jest Grane 24, and Wysokie Obcasy.

Since its founding, Gazeta Wyborcza's investigative journalism has played a key role in shaping the Polish public opinion, such as its coverage of the Rywin affair, the Skin Hunters scandal in 2002, and the PKN Orlen scandal in 2004. In recent years, Gazeta Wyborcza has emerged as a leading liberal voice on issues like the separation of church and state and civil liberties, including women's rights and LGBT rights, which has sometimes resulted in conflicts with Poland's conservative PiS-led government (which was in power between 2015 and 2023). As of June 2022, Gazeta Wyborcza had over 290,000 digital subscribers, and 80,000 print sales. In 2020, Gazeta Wyborcza was the 10th most read newspaper in Europe.

== History and profile ==
=== Founding ===
Gazeta Wyborcza was established in accordance with the arrangements of the Round Table, as a press organ of the Solidarity Civic Committee in the election campaign before the parliamentary elections in 1989. Initially, the daily was to be called Gazeta Codzienna, and the adjective "election" was to function only during the election campaign. The first eight-page issue was published on 8 May 1989, in a circulation of 150,000 copies.

Gazeta Wyborcza was first published on 8 May 1989, under the rhyming masthead motto, "Nie ma wolności bez Solidarności" ("There's no freedom without Solidarity"). The founders were Andrzej Wajda, Aleksander Paszyński and Zbigniew Bujak. Its founding was an outcome of the Polish Round Table Agreement between the communist government of the People's Republic of Poland and political opponents centred on the Solidarity movement. It was initially owned by Agora SA. Later the American company Cox Communications partially bought the daily.

The paper was to serve as the voice of the Solidarity movement during the run-up to the 1989 parliamentary elections (hence its title). As such, it was the first legal newspaper published outside the government's control since its founding of regime in the late 1940s.

It was prepared by 20 journalists, most previously associated with the underground weekly Tygodnik Mazowsze. Michnik convinced Wałęsa to name him the editor-in-chief. Helena Łuczywo and Ernest Skalski became Michnik's deputies. The first editorial office was located in a former kindergarten in Mokotów.

According to the editors, the first edition was small (150,000 copies) and relatively expensive due to the limited supplies of paper made available by the government. A year and a half later, the daily run had reached 500,000 copies. In September 1990, during the breakup of the Solidarity camp following the collapse of the communist government, Wałęsa revoked the paper's right to use the Solidarity logo on its masthead. Since then, the Gazeta Wyborcza has been an independent newspaper broadly aligned with the centre-left and liberal position.

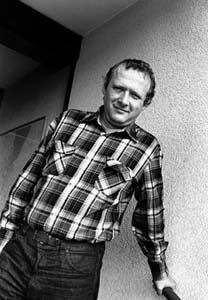
Adam Michnik in 1991

After the Round Table talks during the presidential crisis, on 3 July 1989, an article by Michnik, with the headline: "Your president, our prime minister," where he opted for the election of the president on the recommendation of the Polish United Workers' Party and at the same time entrusting the mission of forming a government to a representative of the "Solidarity," postulating "an alliance of the democratic opposition with the reformist wing of the ruling camp." This proposal is currently interpreted as a proof of sensing the aspirations of the Solidarity camp to take over more power than was agreed at the Round Table, but officially met with opposition. Nevertheless, it was actually implemented: while Wojciech Jaruzelski, the current First Secretary of the Central Committee of the Polish United Workers' Party, took over the position of president, the opposition, thanks to the votes of former allies of the communist party, formed the first non-communist government in Eastern Europe with Tadeusz Mazowiecki as prime minister.

From the second half of 1989, the environment concentrated in the editorial office of Wyborcza sympathized with the government of Tadeusz Mazowiecki, and at the same time was in conflict with the representatives of Tygodnik Solidarność. These antagonisms correlated with the political conflict known as the "War on the Mountain", during which Wałęsa allied himself with the Civic Committee faction represented by the brothers Lech and Jarosław Kaczyński against Mazowiecki. Adam Michnik supported the Prime Minister's environment, as a result of which, in September 1990, the National Commission of "Solidarity" adopted a resolution aimed at taking away Wyborcza the right to place the "Solidarity" stamp on the vignette. It was argued that "the bias of articles aimed at discrediting and ridiculing the chairman of Lech Wałęsa" and explaining that "Gazeta is not an information organ of "S", but a private company."

At that time, Tygodnik Solidarność, whose editor-in-chief at the time was Jarosław Kaczyński, published columns by columnists such as Romuald Szeremietiew, who accused the newspaper of manipulating information, including concealing events. As a result, the daily lost the right to use the union's logo and the slogan "There is no freedom without Solidarity". In addition, Wałęsa demanded the dismissal of Michnik (since July 1990 belonging to the Movement of Citizens, Democratic Action party) from the post of editor-in-chief. Michnik resigned, but his resignation was not accepted by the members of the editorial office, and therefore he remained in office. A group of former oppositionists associated with Lech Wałęsa left the editorial office, which was the result of a dispute within the editorial office with a group of post-Solidarity circles representing different views.

== Controversies ==
In the following years, Wyborcza's publications contributed to the disclosure of socio-political events in Poland. The daily began a journalistic investigation into the 1997 "gelatin scandal," a monopoly scam which included an entrepreneur Kazimierz Grabek.

=== Rywin affair ===
On 27 December 2002, Wyborcza published an article "An act for a bribe. Rywin comes to Michnik," related to an attempt to bribe the editor-in-chief of the newspaper by the film producer Lew Rywin. The aim of Rywin's actions, who presented himself as a representative of the "group holding power", was to persuade Michnik to support the law prepared by the ruling Alliance of the Democratic Left, preventing the expansion of media companies to electronic media. Smoleński's article initiated the Rywin affair, which resulted in the appointment of a parliamentary investigative commission. Together with other corruption scandals plaguing the country, the Rywin affair plunged the government of Leszek Miller, but Michnik himself—also screened by the commission in terms of business connections with Agora—met with a wave of criticism from other media.

In 2003, a Polish film producer Lew Rywin was accused by Gazeta Wyborcza of attempted bribery after he had allegedly solicited a bribe of $17.5 million from the editor Adam Michnik in exchange for amendments to a draft media legislation. The adoption of the draft law in the government's original form would have prevented Agora S.A. from purchasing Polsat, one of Poland's private TV stations. The case, dubbed the Rywin affair, led to an official inquiry by the Polish Parliament. Consequently, Lew Rywin was sentenced for attempting to influence the parliamentary legislative process aimed at enabling a Polish media company to buy a television station. The controversial draft legislation ended up being rejected by the Polish parliament.

=== Other major reports ===
A newspaper article from 23 January 2002 revealed an affair regarding the killing of patients by the employees of the Lodz ambulance service, which the labelled the Skin Hunters, and the sale of information about deaths to funeral parlors.

An April 2004 report revealed irregularities related to the detention by the State Protection Office of the president of PKN Orlen, Andrzej Modrzejewski, and depriving him of his position in February 2002, initiating the Orlen scandal. The parliamentary investigative committee showed unclear interests in the then attempted privatization of Orlen, and Zbigniew Siemiątkowski, the head of the UOP responsible for arresting Modrzejewski, was convicted by a final judgment for abuse of power.

As a result of the article from 4 December 2006 entitled "Work for sex in Self-Defense," another political and moral scandal called the sex scandal broke out. Kącki revealed that Andrzej Lepper, president of the Samoobrona RP party and incumbent deputy prime minister, allegedly employed young women in party offices in exchange for sex.

== Criticism ==
Gazeta Wyborcza used its influence to whitewash former communists, particularly General Jaruzelski. After the fall of real socialism, the paper was criticized for taking part in an "intensive propaganda campaign" and particularly for rigorously trying to revamp Jaruzelski's image.

== Circulation ==
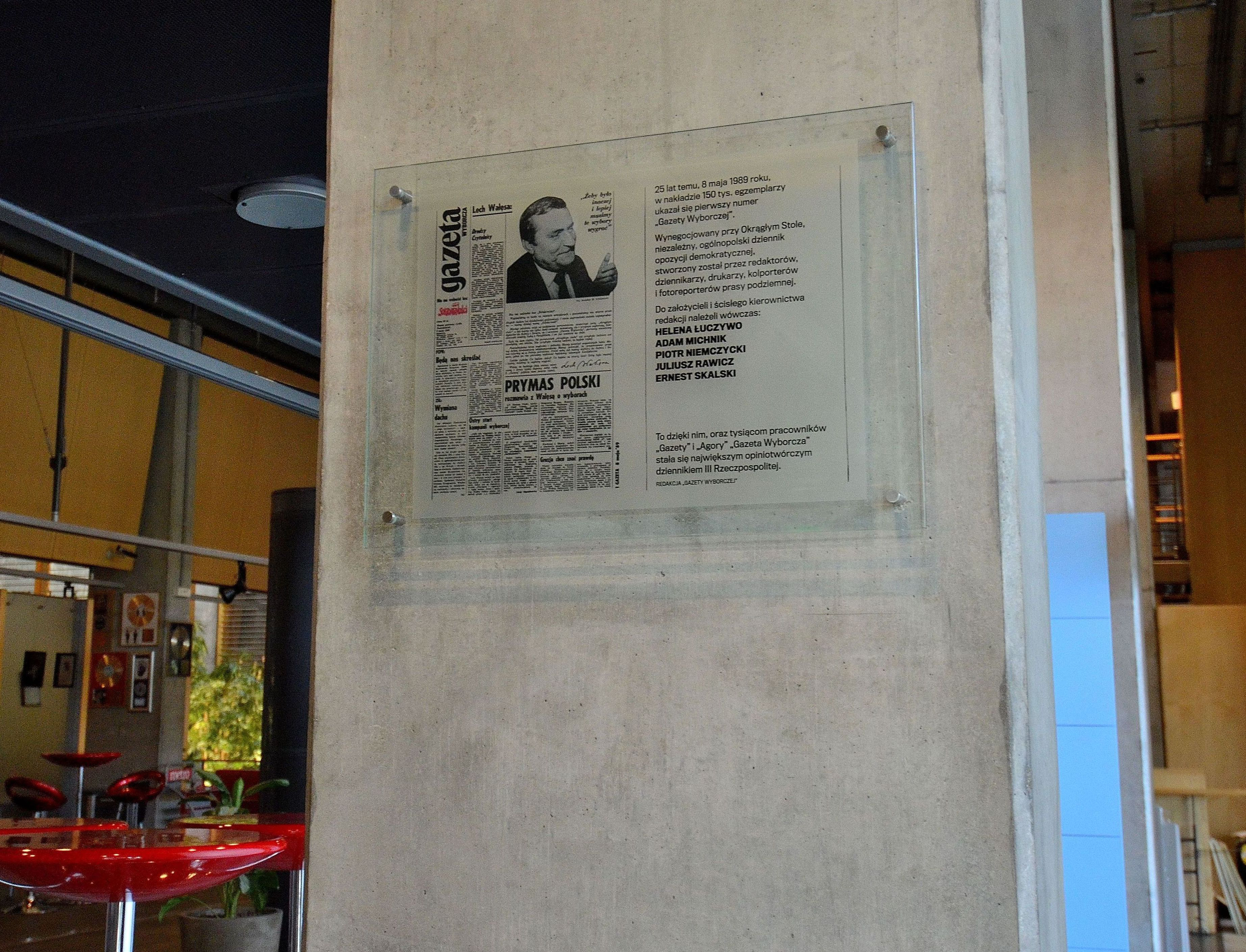
The plaque in the lobby of Gazeta Wyborcza commemorating the first front page of 8 May 1989, with a picture of Lech Wałęsa rooting for the pivotal election

The paper is a multi-section daily newspaper and it publishes daily local editions for the following cities: Warsaw, Białystok, Bydgoszcz, Częstochowa, Gdańsk, Gorzów Wielkopolski, Katowice, Kraków, Kielce, Lublin, Łódź, Olsztyn, Opole, Płock, Poznań, Radom, Rzeszów, Szczecin, Toruń, Wrocław, and Zielona Góra.

The Gazeta Wyborcza had a circulation of 432,000 copies during the first three quarters of 1998. The circulation of the paper reached 459,473 copies between January and February 2001. Its circulation was 542,000 copies in 2003, making it the second best selling newspaper in the country. The 2004 circulation of the paper was 516,000 copies on weekdays and 686,000 copies on weekends. The average circulation of the newspaper peaked at 672,000, making the Gazeta Wyborcza the largest-selling newspaper in Poland. However, by 2010 the circulation had declined by more than half, to 319,000, and Fakt overtook the Gazeta Wyborcza as Poland's leading newspaper. The decline continued in 2013 when circulation was down to 190,000. At this time, Wyborcza began to invest more in its electronic version, and launched a subscription service. Paper circulation dropped to 86,000 in 2019, and stabilised at 81,000 in early 2020. As of January 2021, average daily circulation is 62,000. In August 2021, average daily circulation dropped to 53,190. As of August 2025, average daily circulation is 26,814.

=== Changing the operating mode ===
In September 2020, the office space occupied by the editorial office at ul. Czerska in Warsaw has decreased by 40%, because the journalists of the newspaper and its website work outside the office: the employees of the paper edition can work homework, and most of the journalists and editors of the website work remotely.

== Sections ==
Front page in April 2006, with a headline announcing the minority cabinet of Jarosław Kaczyński

Gazeta Wyborcza is divided into several sections. On the other side of the diary there is a collection of columns written by people associated with the magazine's editorial office, entitled "On the other side". The following sections are arranged according to the topics covered:

- The Country and World sections apply to news coming from Poland and abroad, respectively.
- The Welcome to Poland section contains reports on social issues.
- The Opinions section is a collection of journalistic articles written by editorial staff and external experts.
- The Culture section is devoted to cultural events, interviews with artists and observations on a selected cultural field.
- The Science section consists of articles summarizing the latest scientific research in a journalistic form.
- The Sports section describes the latest sports events.

Almost every issue of "Gazeta Wyborcza" contains additional content appearing as part of thematic weeklies. They are: "Large Format", "Ale Historia", "My Business. People, work, innovations", "Wyborcza TV", "Co Jest Grane 24", "Magazyn Świąteczny" and "Wysokie Obcasy".

"Duży Format" is a magazine of reporters of "Gazeta Wyborcza". It is published on Mondays. Reports, social, cultural and historical texts are published.

On Tuesdays, "Mój Biznes. People, work, innovations" devoted to companies, entrepreneurship and innovations in the economy, as well as presenting nationwide and regional announcements from industries.

The Friday supplements of "Gazeta Wyborcza" are: "Wyborcza TV" – a weekly with programs of Polish and foreign stations, which additionally presents interviews with TV creators and regular columns, as well as "Co Jest Grane 24" – a magazine announcing the cultural events of the weekend and the coming week, whose editors write about film and theater premieres, concerts, exhibitions and present recommended restaurants and clubs.

Every Saturday, "Gazeta Wyborcza" publishes: "Wolna Sobota" – an opinion magazine in which readers will find 40 pages of reading, presenting various worldviews and worlds as well as controversial hypotheses; "Ale Historia" – a historical weekly where its editors reach previously unknown facts, present unique places and people, works of art and cultural events; "Wysokie Obcasy" – a women's magazine that deals with everyday and extraordinary matters, and also publishes portraits of women not necessarily known from the front pages of newspapers.

=== Print style ===
Gazeta Wyborcza is published in a five-column block format, which was adopted at the beginning of the daily's existence. The magazine is printed in color on white paper, and its cover exposes the most important subject of the day in the form of a large headline. The current style of the daily is based on the change made on 7 March 2006, when its graphic design was updated, taken over from Agora's closed daily Nowy Dzien. The primary typeface used in the articles is of the Tribune type, designed by the Boston-based company Font Bureau.

== Online presence ==
Online service logo

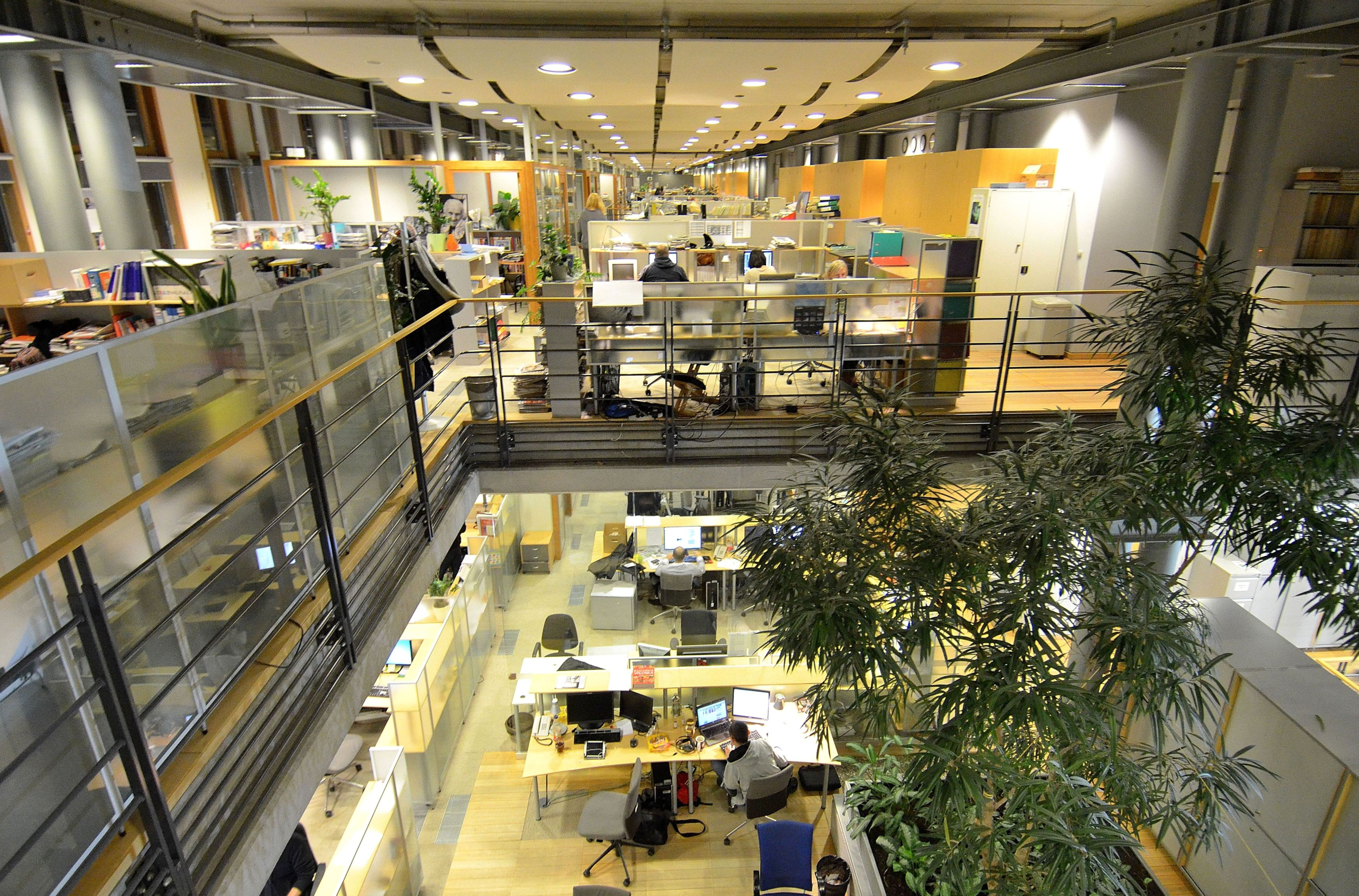
Gazeta Wyborcza editorial office in Warsaw

For the first time, content from supplements to Gazeta Wyborcza was made available by Agora on the Internet in 1994. The first archived pages of the magazine's information website come from December 1996 (located in the gazeta.pl domain), and from May 2001 (located in the Wyborcza.pl domain). As early as 2001, the website functioning in the gazeta.pl domain, initially being the Internet version of Wyborcza, was transformed into a separate informational Internet portal. In 2006, a separate website, gazetawyborcza.pl, was separated from the Gazeta.pl portal, being an electronic version of Gazeta Wyborcza. Currently, the website operates in the Wyborcza.pl domain, functioning as the name of the website. The first editor-in-chief of the website was Edward Krzemień. The Wyborcza.pl website publishes articles that were simultaneously published in the printed version of the daily and its supplements. In addition, the website publishes additional content not present in the printed Gazeta Wyborcza : video materials, thematically grouped photos, drawings. In 2012, an online archive of Gazeta Wyborcza was launched.

In addition to the Wyborcza.pl portal, the content of the magazine is also published on a separate website Wyborcza.biz, devoted to economics and the economy. The Wyborcza.pl website is linked to the BIQdata portal, where socio-political reports are published in the form of charts, infographics and other graphic representations of numerical values. Its opening took place on 23 September 2014.

Wysokie Obcasy.pl features content concerning women and includes section on psychology, health and beauty, food, and jobs. Biqdata.wyborcza.pl is dedicated to stories and developments as seen through the prism of big data and the wider world of information technology.

In 2014, Gazeta Wyborcza introduced a digital subscription. The basic package includes access to the news on the website and through the app. The premium package offers access to all of its content including 28 local editions. The club package offers access to its editorial team, special events, and two additional subscriptions for family members. The entire content of Gazeta Wyborcza on the Internet has been payable since 4 February 2014. The number of digital subscriptions in subsequent years was: 55,000 (2014), 77,000 (2015), 100,000 (2016), 200,000 (2019), 220,000 (2020), and 260,000 (2021).

=== Mobile app ===
Content from Gazeta Wyborcza is available both in the version for personal computers and via the mobile application. On 10 June 2009, iPhone owners were able to download the journal app from the App Store. On 20 July 2012, the iPad application was launched. In February 2012, viewing journal articles was made possible on the Kindle. The first version of the application for devices with the Android operating system, produced by the We Like Caps development studio, appeared on Google Play on 7 July 2014.

== Awards ==
Gazeta Wyborcza received many Grand Press awards; in 2014 it was honored with the title of the Newspaper of the Twenty-Five Years. The title of Journalist of the Year awarded during this ceremony was given in 2007 to Marcin Kącki, in 2010 – Artur Domosławski, in 2011 – Andrzej Poczobut, in 2013 – Mariusz Szczygieł, and in 2014 – Piotr Andrusieczko. In other categories, awards were given to Katarzyna Klukowska, Włodzimierz Kalicki, Jacek Hugo-Bader, Adam Wajrak, Ireneusz Dańko, Dariusz Janowski, Marcin Fabiański, Leszek Talko, Anna Bikont, Artur Włodarski, Tomasz Patora, Marcin Stelmasiak, Anna Fostalkowska, Roman Daszczyński, Krzysztof Wójcik, Angelika Kuźniak, Włodzimierz Nowak, Wojciech Staszewski, Magdalena Grochowska, Maciej Samcik, Joanna Wojciechowska, Paweł Wiejas, Piotr Głuchowski, Marcin Kowalski, Magdalena Grzebałkowska, Urszula Jabłońska, Agnieszka Kublik, Bartosz T. Wieliński, Donata Subbotko, Elżbieta Sidi, Anna Śmigulec, and Grzegorz Sroczyński. Journalists of the magazine were also awarded during four Sharp Pen awards ceremonies.

In 2004, the editorial office was awarded the "Drummer of the Greater Poland Uprising" statuette, awarded by the Main Board of the Society for the Remembrance of the Greater Poland Uprising 1918/1919.

In 2022, Gazeta Wyborcza and the Gazeta Wyborcza Foundation received the Golden Pen of Freedom award for fighting for independent journalism and carrying out its mission despite pressure from the authorities.

== Person of the Year ==
Person of the Year by "Gazeta Wyborcza"
- Native name: Polish: Człowiek Roku „Gazety Wyborczej"
- Country: Poland
- Hosted by: Gazeta Wyborcza
- Established: 1999
- First award: 1999

Highlights
- Total: 27
- Website: https://wyborcza.pl, http://www.gazeta.pl/

Person of the Year by "Gazeta Wyborcza" is an annual title awarded since 1999 by the editorial board of the newspaper. The award was established by Polish historian and intellectual Adam Michnik to mark the newspaper's 10th anniversary.

As the first independent daily newspaper in the Soviet bloc born out of the Solidarity movement, Gazeta Wyborcza used the award to signify a formal embrace of Western liberal values and the "Open Society" model.

The presentation ceremony often functions as a high-profile state event rather than a typical media gala. For example, on 8 May 2000, the ceremony honouring financier George Soros was attended by the President of Poland Aleksander Kwaśniewski, the Prime Minister Jerzy Buzek, and the Foreign Minister Bronisław Geremek. Notable laureates also include former Prime Minister Tadeusz Mazowiecki, who was named Person of the Year in 2009 and additionally recognized as the "Man of the Twenty-Year Period" to celebrate the newspaper's 20th anniversary.

== See also ==
- Michnikowszczyzna. Zapis choroby
- List of newspapers in Poland

== Bibliography ==
- Dudek, Antoni (2013). Historia polityczna Polski 1989–2012 [Political history of Poland 1989–2012] (in Polish). Kraków: Znak. ISBN 978-83-240-2130-7.
- Karpiński, Jakub (2001). Trzecia niepodległość. Najnowsza historia Polski [The third independence. The recent history of Poland]. Warszawa: Świat Książki. ISBN 83-7311-156-5.
