= Czarne (publishing house) =

Publishing house in Wołowiec founded in 1996

Czarne is a publishing house in Wołowiec founded in 1996 by Andrzej Stasiuk and Monika Sznajderman.

== History ==
Czarne was founded in 1996 by the writer Andrzej Stasiuk and anthropologist Monika Sznajder Man, who at the time lived in Czarne, an abandoned Lekko village in the Beskid Niski mountains from which the publisher takes its name. The couple had no publishing experience and set the house up in order to release Stasiuk's own book Przez rzekę; the manuscript was typeset and printed at the Redemptorist monastery printing house in Tuchów, and the first copies were distributed by the founders themselves.

== Books and authors ==
- Krzysztof Varga: Śmiertelność, 45 pomysłów na powieść. Strony B singli 1992–1996, Tequila, Karolina, Nagrobek z lastryko, Gulasz z turula, Aleja Niepodległości, Trociny, Czardasz z mangalicą, Langosz w jurcie, Sonnenberg, Ostrygi i kamienie. Opowieści o Normandii, Bretanii i Pikardii, Śmiejący się pies
- Ignacy Karpowicz: Niehalo, Cud
- Mózg i błazen, 2015
- To See a Moose, 2017
- Żeby nie było śladów. Sprawa Grzegorza Przemyka by Cezary Łazarewicz, 2016

The book received Nike Award.

- Kajś. Opowieść o Górnym Śląsku (Kajś: A Tale of Upper Silesia) by Zbigniew Rokita, 2020

The book received 2021 Nike Award, both the jury and audience choice.

- Moje zmory by Gwendoline Riley, translated by Maciej Stroiński, 2025

== Bibliography ==
- Lemańska, Magdalena (May 2024). "Wydawnictwo Czarne. Dobrze napisany biznes". Forbes Polska: 103.
