= Maurycy Mochnacki Memorial =

Monument in Warsaw, Poland

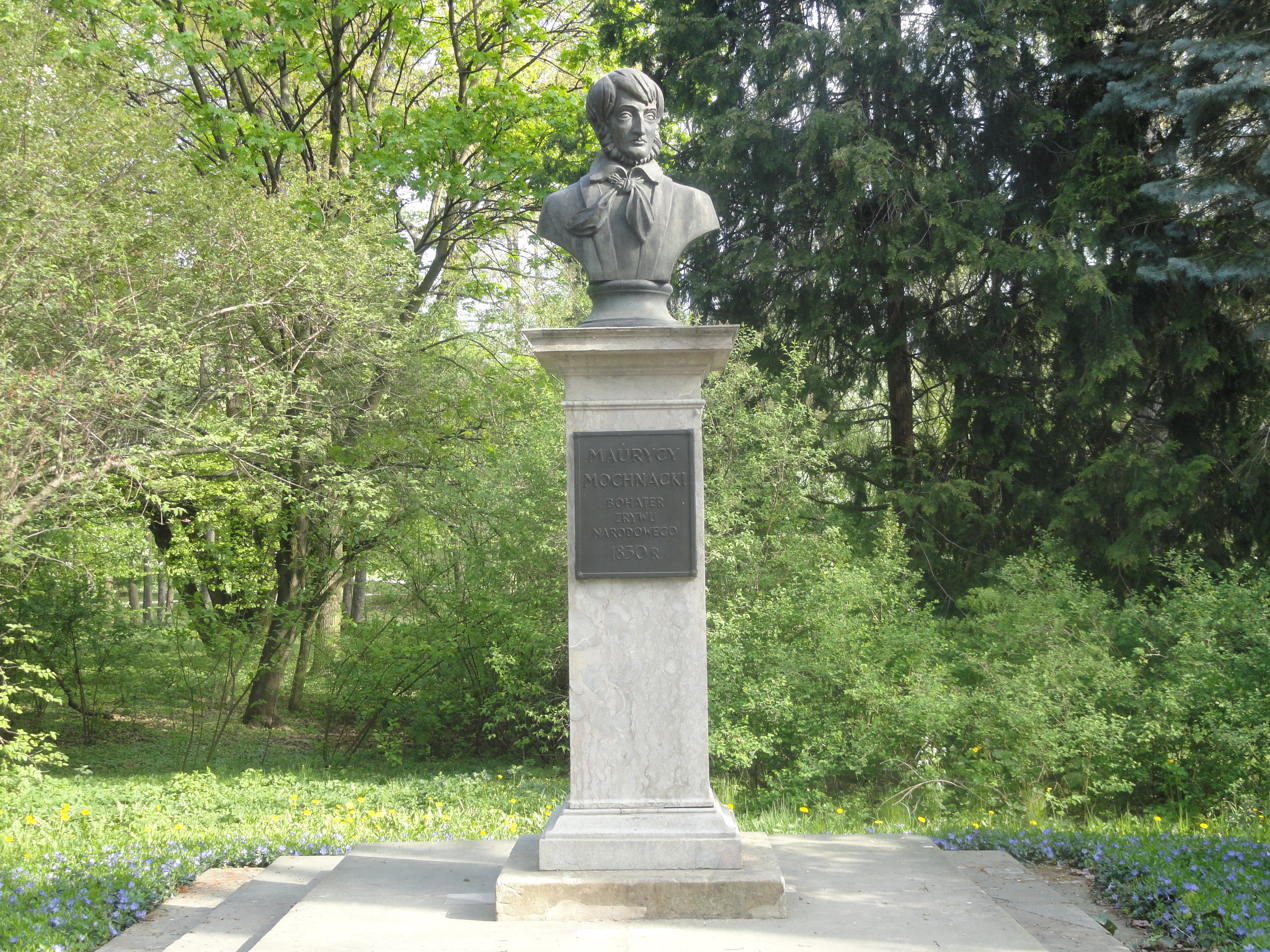
- The monument in 2019.
- Interactive map of Maurycy Mochnacki Memorial
- Location: Royal Barhs Park, Downtown, Warsaw, Poland
- Coordinates: 52°12′43.6″N 21°01′50.2″E
- Designer: Wiesław Winkler
- Type: Bust
- Material: Bronze (bust); marble (pedestal)
- Opening date: 2000
- Dedicated to: Maurycy Mochnacki

The Maurycy Mochnacki Memorial (Polish: Pomnik Maurycego Mochnackiego), also known as the bust of Maurycy Mochnacki (Polish: Popiersie Maurycego Mochnackiego), is a sculpture in Warsaw, Poland, placed in the Royal Baths Park, within the neighbourhood of Ujazdów, in the Downtown district. It is dedicated to Maurycy Mochnacki, a 19th-century literary, theatre and music critic, publicist, journalist, pianist, historian and independence activist, who was one of the leaders and combatants of the November Uprising. The sculpture was designed by Wiesław Winkler, and unveiled in 2000.

== History ==
The bust sculpture was designed by Wiesław Winkler, and unveiled in 2000. It was placed on a marble pedestal, previously used to display a bust Alexander I, the Emperor of Russia from 1801 to 1825, and King of Poland from 1815 to 1825. It was unveiled there in around 1822, and is currently considered a lost work of art.

== Design ==
The monument consists of a bronze bust of Maurycy Mochnacki, placed on a marble pedestal. It features a plaque with Polish inscription which reads: "Maurycy Mochnacki. Bohater zrywu narodowego 1830 r.", and translates to "Maurycy Mochnacki. The hero of the national uprising of 1830". It is located in the Royal Barhs Park, near the Egyptian Temple.
