= Michał Witkowski =

Polish novelist

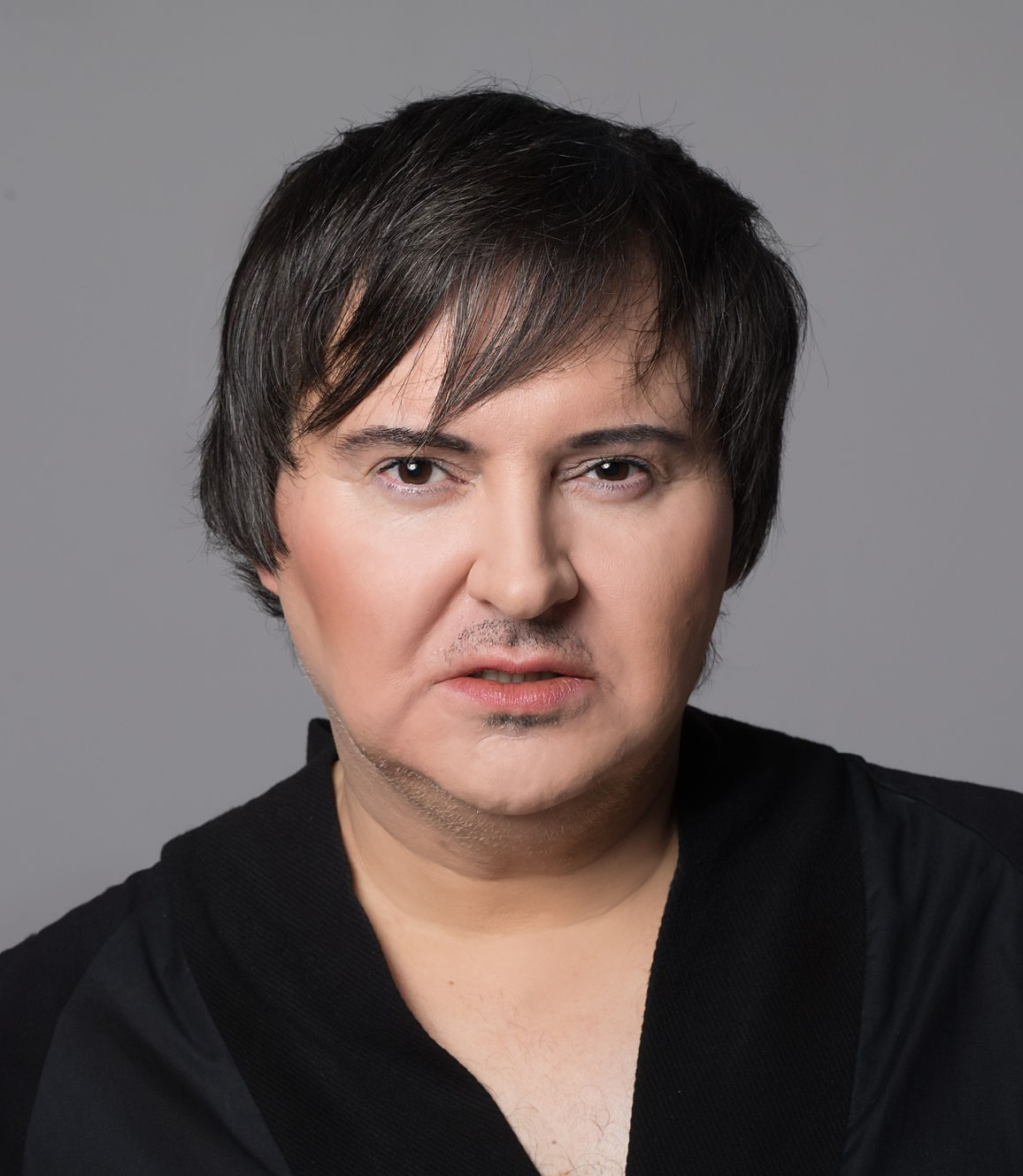
- Michał Witkowski (2023)
- Born: January 17, 1975 (age 51); Wrocław, Poland
- Occupation: Novelist
- Writing career
- Language: Polish

Michał Witkowski (born 17 January 1975) is a Polish novelist.

== Life and career ==
His first "official" work, Copyright, published in 2001, was a collection of short stories. However, he had previously published, Zgorszeni wstają od stołów in 1997 as Michał S. Witkowski, with the S. standing for Sebastian.

On December 17, 2004, Lubiewo was published — a radically queer novel that sold an estimated 15,000 copies. The novel has been translated into German, English (Lovetown), Spanish, Dutch, Finnish (2007), French, Russian, Czech, Lithuanian, Ukrainian, Slovenian (2010) and Hungarian (2010). His next collection of stories Fototapeta (Photo-wallpaper) was published in 2006 by W.A.B. More recently, Witkowski has published two "queer crime novels", in which a gay writer named Michał Witkowski acts as first-person narrator and detective: Drwal (The Woodcutter, 2011) and Zbrodniarz i dziewczyna (The Criminal and the Girl, 2014).

Witkowski was nominated three times for the Nike Award, Poland's best-known literary award: in 2006 for Lubiewo (shortlist), in 2007 for Barbara Radziwiłłówna z Jaworzna-Szczakowej (longlist), and in 2012 for Drwal (longlist). Lubiewo won the Gdynia Literary Prize in 2006, and Barbara Radziwiłłówna z Jaworzna-Szczakowej was awarded the Paszport Polityki in 2007. Lovetown, the English translation of Lubiewo was longlisted for the Independent Foreign Fiction Prize in 2011.

He has been a contributor to Wprost since July 2014. Previously he had worked for six years for Polityka. He is also author of a fashion blog, Fashion Pathology.

== Personal life ==
He describes himself as a homosexual. He rejects the label "gay" as a personal identity as referring to a subculture in the queer community, those commonly represented by popular culture.

== Works ==
- Copyright. Zielona Sowa. 2001. ISBN 83-7220-247-8.
- Lubiewo. Korporacja ha!art. 2005. ISBN 83-89911-04-3.
- Fototapeta. W.A.B. 2006. ISBN 83-7414-159-X.
- Barbara Radziwiłłówna z Jaworzna-Szczakowej. W.A.B. 2007. ISBN 978-83-7414-372-1.
- Margot. Świat Książki. 2009. ISBN 978-83-247-1745-3.
- Drwal. Świat Książki. 2011. ISBN 978-83-7799-483-2.
- Lubiewo bez cenzury (Lubiewo uncensored). Świat Książki. 2012. ISBN 978-83-7799-860-1.
- Zbrodniarz i dziewczyna. Świat Książki. 2014. ISBN 978-83-7943-284-4.
- Fynf und cfancyś. Znak. 2015. ISBN 978-83-240-2742-2.
- Wymazane. Znak. 2017.
- Wiara. Autobiografia. Znak. 2023.

== See also ==
- Polish literature
- List of Polish writers
