= To See a Moose =

2017 non-fiction book by Agnieszka Kościańska

To See a Moose: The History of Polish Sex Education
- Author: Agnieszka Kościańska
- Translator: Philip Palmer
- Language: Polish
- Publisher: Czarne Publishing House, Berghahn Books
- Publication date: 2017
- English publication date: 2021

To See a Moose: The History of Polish Sex Education (originally Polish: Zobaczyć łosia. Historia polskiej edukacji seksualnej od pierwszej lekcji do internetu) is a book by Polish anthropologist Agnieszka Kościańska. It was originally published in 2017 by the Czarne Publishing House. An English translation by Philip Palmer was published in 2021 by Berghahn Books.
