= Eliza Kącka =

Writer and academic

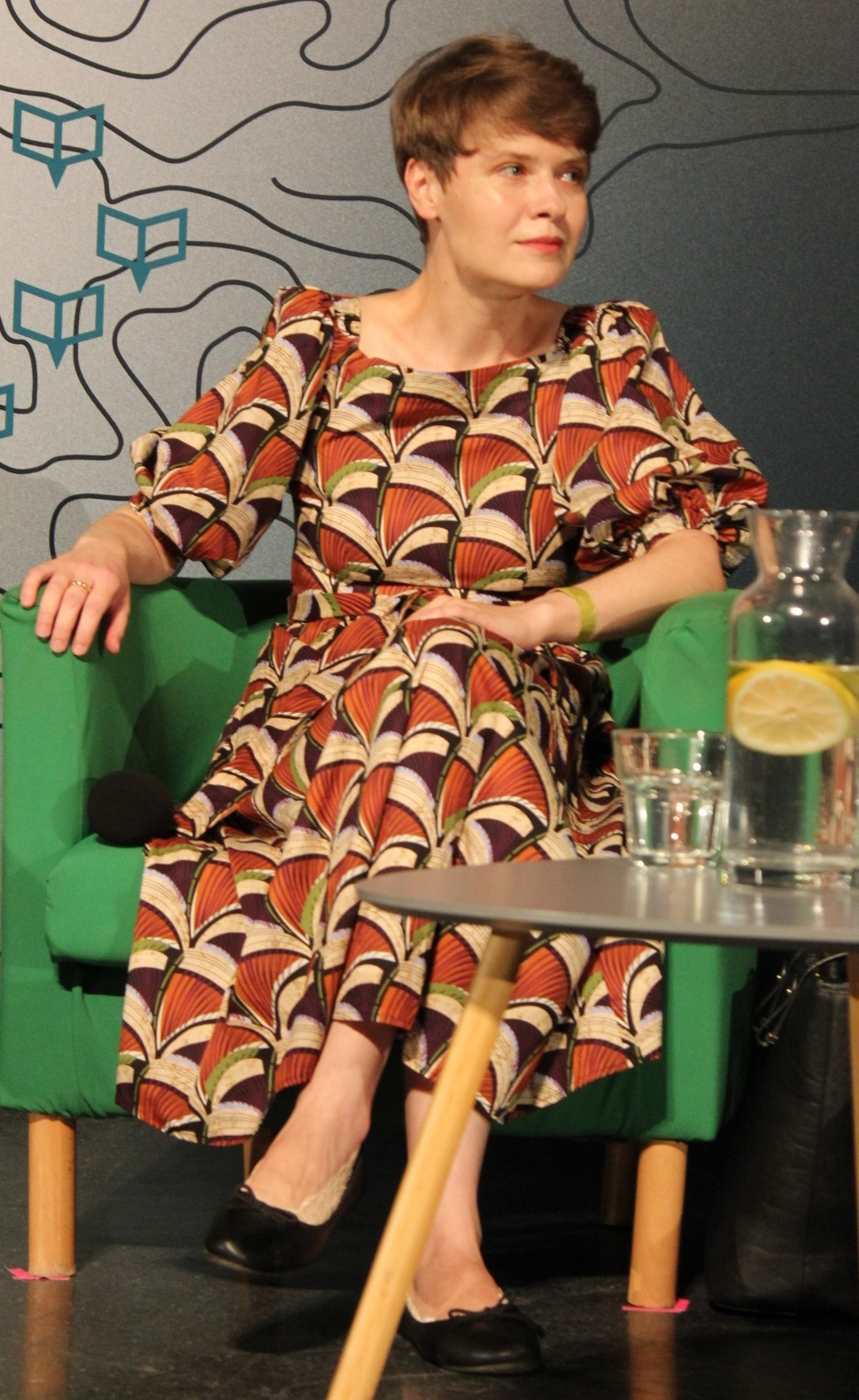
- Eliza Kącka, 2024
- Occupations: Writer, literary scholar

Eliza Maria Kącka is a writer and literary scholar.

== Biography ==
In 2016 she obtained doctorate in literature studies at the University of Warsaw. Also from 2016 she has been employed at the University of Warsaw. In 2024 it was announced that she would become columnist of Tygodnik Powszechny.

== Books ==
=== Monographs ===
- Stanisław Brzozowski wobec Cypriana Norwida. Warszawa: Wydawnictwo Wydziału Polonistyki Uniwersytetu Warszawskiego. 2012. ISBN 978-83-621-0073-6.
- Lektura jako spotkanie. Brzozowski – tekst – metoda. Kraków: Universitas. 2017. ISBN 978-83-242-3112-6.

=== Prose ===
- Wczoraj byłaś zła na zielono. Kraków: Wydawnictwo Karakter. 2024. ISBN 978-83-68059-15-1.

=== Editions ===
- Poeci i poetki przekraczają granice. Sto wierszy. Katowice: Wydawnictwo FA-art. 2011. ISBN 978-83-60406-18-2. Co-edited with Tomasz Gerszberg and Konrad Kęder.

== Awards ==
For her book Wczoraj byłaś zła na zielono she received Nike Award in 2025, both jury and audience choice; and Wawrzyn Literary Award of Warmia and Masuria in 2025, both jury and audience choice.
