= Canon of Polish literature =

Most important works in Polish literature

The canon of Polish literature (also known as the Polish canon) is a literary criticism term referring to attempts to define the most important works in Polish literature.

Piotr Wilczek broadly defines the Polish canon as based on compulsory reading lists, meaning it is national with a mix of nationalist-communist influences. According to Wilczek, the canon of Polish literature has never been clearly defined (i.e., there is no officially recognized list of works, although certain works, such as Adam Mickiewicz's Pan Tadeusz, are widely regarded as part of such a canon). There were some attempts to define and alter the canon during the Marxist period (post-World War II), but these efforts failed. The Polish canon is more traditional than the Western canon, which has undergone certain re-evaluations over the past few decades (e.g., including more works by women and previously marginalized minorities). According to Wilczek, the Polish canon continues in a conservative and traditionalist tradition (privileging patriarchal, male, ethnically Polish discourse, etc.).

Attempts to create canons of Polish literature are sometimes undertaken by media or organizations. In Poland, book publishers have undertaken the creation of a canon of literary works. Since 1919, the Biblioteka Narodowa (National Library) series has been published, presenting the most important works of Polish and world literature with extensive commentary, including the current state of knowledge about each work. Between 1971 and 1983, there was a joint series of publishers (individual volumes were released by different publishers in a common graphic design) – Biblioteka Klasyki Polskiej i Obcej (Library of Polish and Foreign Classics) – intended to present classic works of Polish and foreign literature.

== See also ==
- Classic book
- Compulsory reading
