= Zbigniew Rokita =

Writer (born 1989)

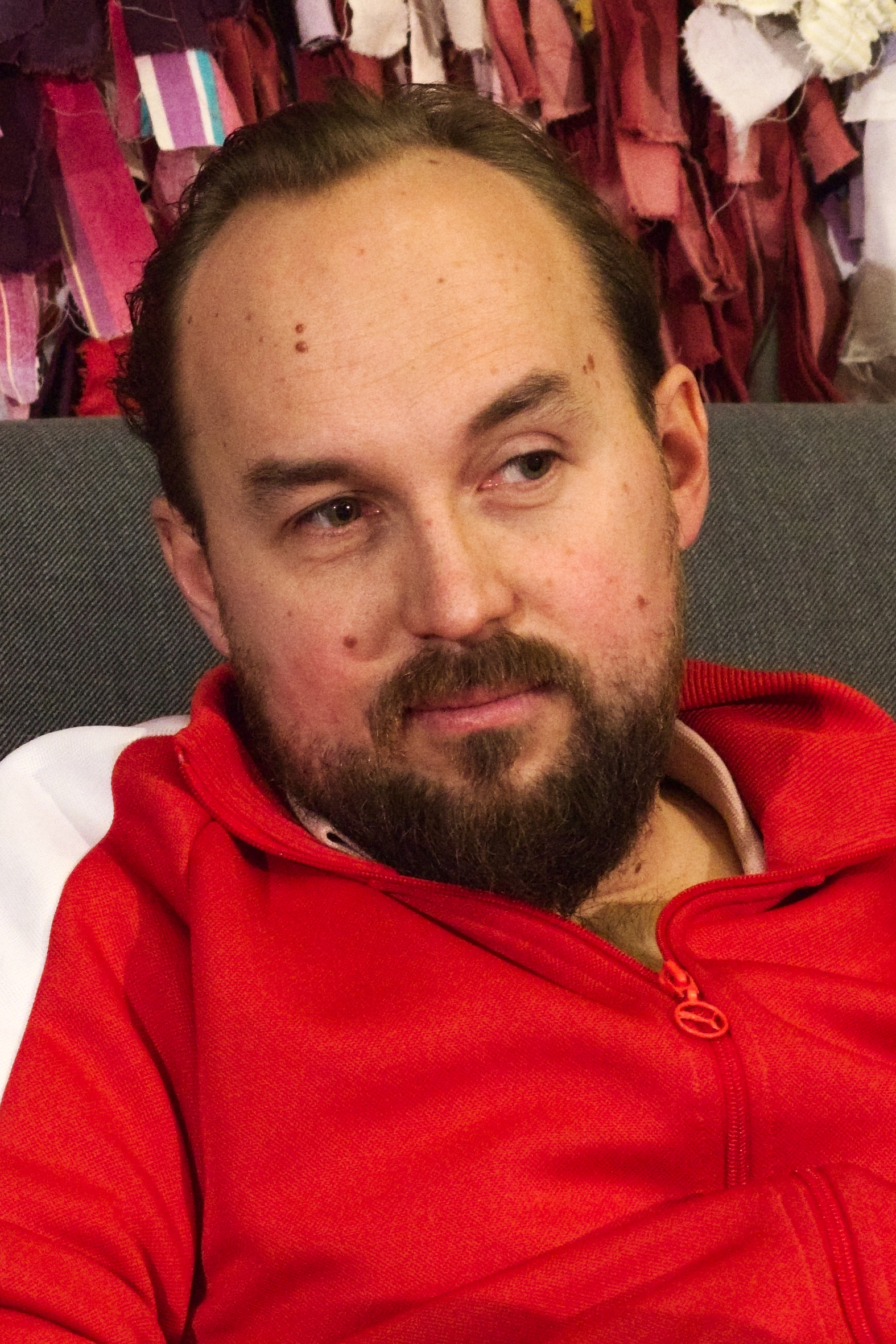
- Zbigniew Rokita, 2025
- Born: 1989
- Occupation: Writer

Zbigniew Rokita (born 1989) is a writer.

== Biography ==
He is a fan of Piast Gliwice.

== Books ==
- Na końcu języka. Białystok: Fundacja Sąsiedzi. 2015. ISBN 978-83-64505-12-6.
- Królowie strzelców. Piłka w cieniu imperium. Wołowiec: Wydawnictwo Czarne. 2018. ISBN 978-83-8049-644-6.
- Kajś. Opowieść o Górnym Śląsku. Wołowiec: Wydawnictwo Czarne. 2020. ISBN 978-83-8191-077-4.
- Odrzania. Podróż po ziemiach odzyskanych. Kraków: Wydawnictwo Znak Litera Nova. 2023. ISBN 978-83-240-9647-3.
- Aglo. Banką po Śląsku. Kraków: Wydawnictwo Znak Litera Nova. 2025. ISBN 978-83-8367-444-5.

== Awards ==
His book Kajś. Opowieść o Górnym Śląsku (Kajś: A Tale of Upper Silesia) won 2021 Nike Award, both the jury and audience choice.
