= Bronka Nowicka =

Polish writer and artist

Bronka Nowicka (born 1974) is a Polish writer and artist. She was born in Radomsk and studied film direction at Łódź Film School. She also studied painting at the Academy of Fine Arts in Kraków. She went on to pursue a PhD in fine art, focusing on multimedia. Nowicka's interest in new media has led her to experiment with tomographics and tomovideo.

Nowicka is also an accomplished writer. Her first book, a collection of prose poetry titled Nakarmić kamień (To Feed a Stone), appeared in 2015. It won the Nike Literary Award, Poland's most prestigious literary award. It was the first time that the prize had been given to a debut work. The book also won the Złoty Środek Poezji (Golden Mean of Poetry) Award.

In 2017, the New Voices From Europe project named Nowicka as one of the most promising writers in Europe. Her work has been translated into English, German, Russian and a variety of European languages.
