= Zyta Rudzka =

Polish novelist and screenwriter (born 1964)

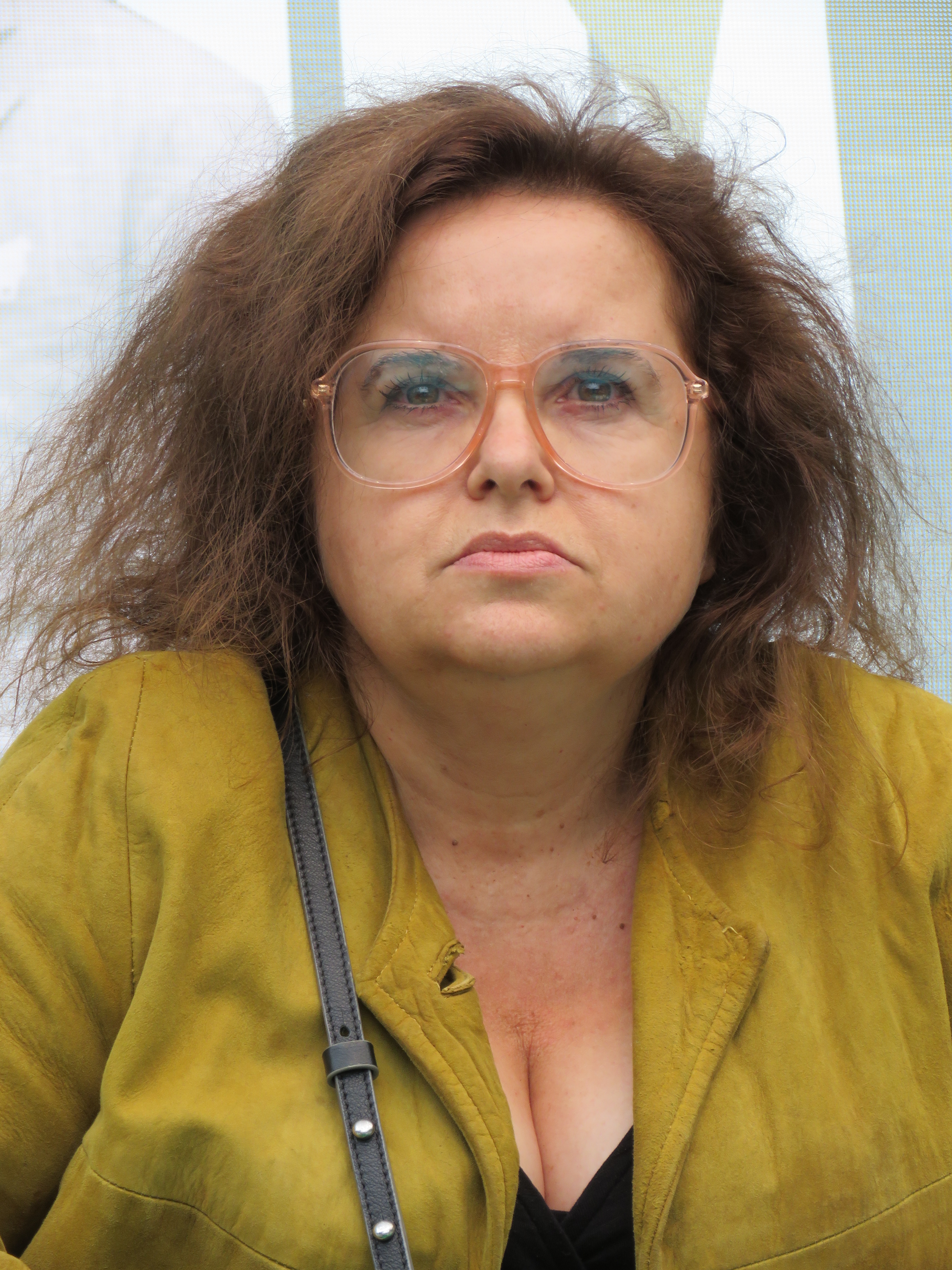
- Rudzka in 2018
- Born: 10 October 1964 (age 61); Warsaw, Poland
- Education: Cardinal Stefan Wyszyński University
- Occupations: Novelist; screenwriter; poet; psychologist
- Writing career
- Genre: fiction
- Notable works: Ten się śmieje kto ma zęby (2022); Tkanki miękkie (2020)
- Notable awards: Gdynia Literary Prize (2018); Nike Award (2023)

Zyta Rudzka (Polish pronunciation: [ˈzɨta ˈrud͡zka]; born 10 October 1964) is a Polish novelist, screenwriter, poet and psychologist. She is regarded as one of the most prominent contemporary Polish writers. In 2023, she received the Nike Award.

== Life and career ==
In 1991, she graduated in psychology from the Cardinal Stefan Wyszyński University in Warsaw. She debuted in 1989 with a poetry book Ruchoma rzeczywistość (Moving Reality). Her first novel, Białe klisze (White Films), was published in 1991.

In 1995, the film Erna Rosenstein. Wieczność dla Nikogo based on her script received an award at the Documentary Film Festival in Kraków.

In 2003, she was a jury member of the Debiut TV programme broadcast on Polsat.

In 2016, the theatrical performance of her play Cukier Stanik directed by Agata Puszcz won the Gold Remi Award at the WorldFest-Houston International Film Festival.

Her 2018 book Krótka wymiana ognia (A Brief Exchange of Fire) won the Gdynia Literary Prize and was shortlisted for Poland's top literature prize, the Nike Award. The book was included on the list of best Polish novels of the last decade by the Polityka weekly magazine.

In 2021, she was awarded the City of Warsaw Prize for her book Tkanki miękkie (Soft Tissues).

In 2023, she won the Nike Award for her novel Ten się śmieje, kto ma zęby (Only Those with Teeth Can Smile). In the same year, she received the Poznań Literary Award for Lifetime Achievement and was longlisted for the Angelus Award.

Her works have benn translated into numerous languages including German, Czech, Italian, French, English, Japanese, Croatian and Russian.

== Works ==
=== Novels ===
- Białe klisze (White Films, 1993)
- Uczty i głody (1995)
- Pałac Cezarów (1995)
- Mykwa (1999)
- Dziewczyny Bonda (2004)
- Ślicznotka doktora Josefa (Dr. Josef's Little Beauty, 2006)
- Krótka wymiana ognia (A Brief Exchange of Fire, 2018)
- Tkanki miękkie (Soft Tissues, 2020)
- Ten się śmieje, kto ma zęby (Only Those with Teeth Can Smile, 2022)

=== Plays ===
- Latanie dla ornitologów (2005)
- Fastryga (2006)
- Cukier Stanik (2007)
- Eskimos w podróży służbowej (2008)
- Pęknięta, obwiązana nitką (2010)
- Zimny Bufet (2011)

=== Poetry ===
- Ruchoma rzeczywistość (Moving Reality, 1989)

== See also ==
- Polish literature
- List of Polish writers
