= Ignacy Karpowicz =

Writer (1976–2026)

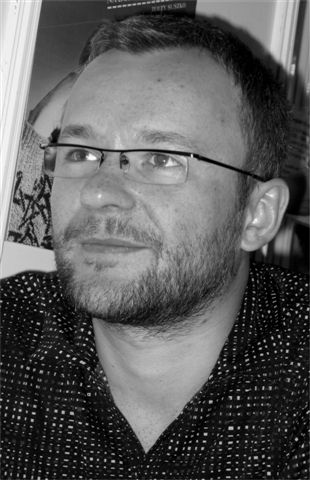
- Karpowicz in 2007
- Born: 26 July 1976; Białystok, Poland
- Died: 22 August 2026 (aged 50)
- Education: University of Warsaw (1995–1998)
- Occupation: Author
- Awards: Nike Readers' Award, Paszport Polityki

Ignacy Karpowicz (26 July 1976 – 22 August 2026) was a Polish writer.

== Biography ==
He spent his childhood in the village of Słuczanka near Białystok and in the city of Białystok. He studied on the Inter-area Individual Studies in the Humanities programme at the University of Warsaw between 1995 and 1998. He died on 22 August 2026.

== Books ==
- Niehalo. Wołowiec: Wydawnictwo Czarne. 2006. ISBN 978-83-89755-46-9.
- Cud. Wołowiec: Wydawnictwo Czarne. 2007. ISBN 978-83-89755-87-2.
- Nowy kwiat cesarza (i pszczoły). Warszawa: Państwowy Instytut Wydawniczy. 2007. ISBN 978-83-06-03077-8.
- Gesty. Kraków: Wydawnictwo Literackie. 2008. ISBN 978-83-08-04260-1.
- Balladyny i romanse. Kraków: Wydawnictwo Literackie. 2010. ISBN 978-83-08-04494-0.
- ości. Kraków: Wydawnictwo Literackie. 2013. ISBN 978-83-08-05117-7.
- Sońka. Kraków: Wydawnictwo Literackie. 2014. ISBN 978-83-08-05353-9.
- Miłość. Kraków: Wydawnictwo Literackie. 2017. ISBN 978-83-08-06410-8.
- Cicho, cichutko. Kraków: Wydawnictwo Literackie. 2021. ISBN 978-83-08-07374-2.
- Ludzie z nieba. Kraków: Wydawnictwo Literackie. 2024. ISBN 978-83-08-07994-2.

== Accolades ==
He was nominated five times for the Nike Award, including four times in the final of the award. In 2014 he received Nike Readers' Award for Ości. In 2011 he received Paszport Polityki for Balladyny i romanse; he was nominated also in 2007 for Niehalo.
