= Mariusz Szczygieł =

Polish journalist and writer (born 1966)

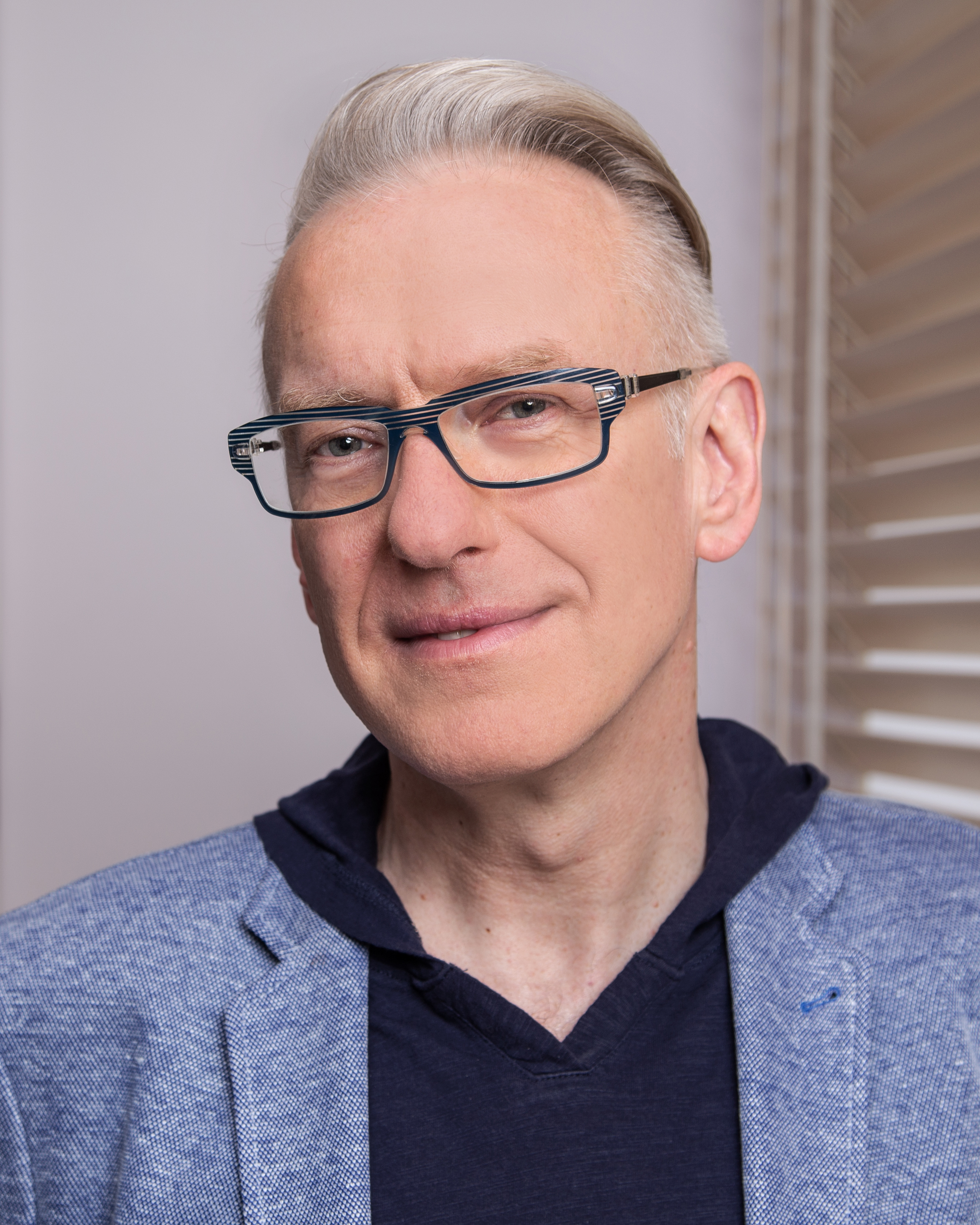
- Szczygieł in 2019
- Born: Mariusz Szczygieł; 5 September 1966 (age 59); Złotoryja, Poland
- Education: University of Warsaw
- Occupations: Journalist, writer
- Writing career
- Language: Polish
- Notable works: Gottland (2006); Nie ma (2018)
- Notable awards: Beata Pawlak Award (2007); European Book Prize (2009); Nike Award (2019)

Mariusz Adam Szczygieł (Polish pronunciation: [ˈmarjuʂ ˈadam ˈʂt͡ʂɨɡjɛw]; born 5 September 1966 Złotoryja, Poland) is a Polish journalist and writer. He is the winner of the 2009 European Book Prize for Gottland and the 2019 Nike Award, the most important prize in Polish literature.

== Life and career ==
At 16, Szczygieł began writing for the weekly-paper Na przełaj. In spite of communist-era censorship, he published a shocking collection of reports titled The Shrift, which were about gay and lesbian youth in Poland.

Szczygieł graduated in journalism and political science from the University of Warsaw in 2000.

As a presenter of the popular TV cultural and current affairs programme Na każdy temat (On Every Topic) Szczygieł became the first person to utter the word "orgasm" on Polish television.

In 2002, he stopped working for TV Polsat and concentrated on writing for Gazeta Wyborcza. Presently, he is the senior deputy editor of the weekly supplement Duży Format and deputy editor of its reportage-section.

His works are cited in most anthologies of contemporary Polish journalism. Most notable are his studies of the Czechoslovak, and especially Czech, culture and life-style. His best-selling book Gottland (2006), was described by Adam Michnik, as the first cubistic reportage of the world. Gottland received the European Book Prize, the Polish Booksellers Prize. and the Nike Audience Award.

In 2019 he won Nike Award, for his reportage Nie ma, which won both the Jury Prize and the Audience Poll.

His works have been translated into Czech, English, Estonian, German, Hebrew, Hungarian, Italian, Romanian, Russian, Slovak, Slovenian, Spanish, and Ukrainian.

== Personal life ==
Szczygieł is an outspoken atheist.

In his 2022 book Fakty muszą zatańczyć (The Facts Must Dance) he came out as a gay man.

== Awards and honours ==
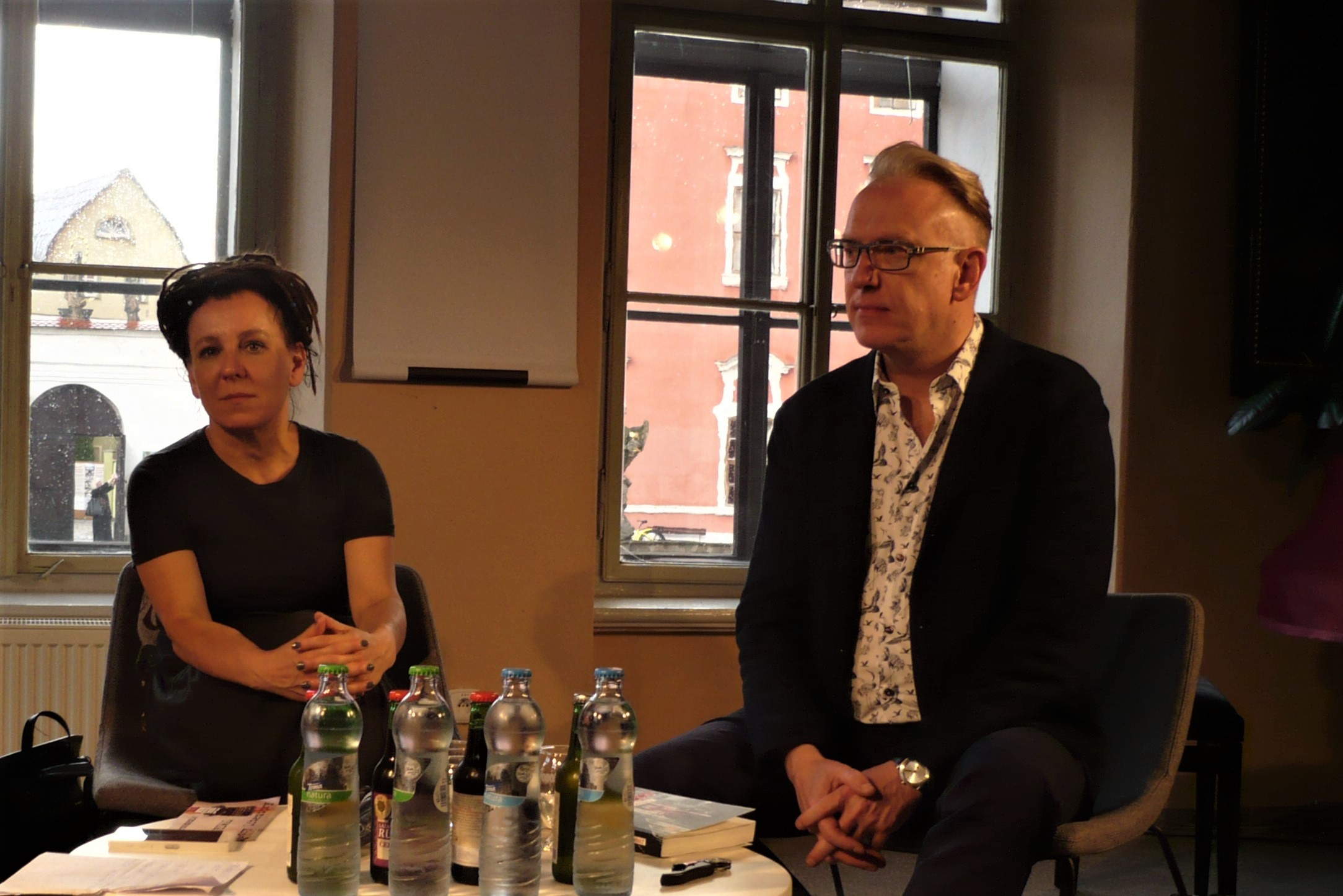
Szczygieł and Olga Tokarczuk in 2017

- 1993: Polish Journalists' Association Award
- 1996: Kryształowe Zwierciadło Award
- 1997: Polsat TV Award (Best Talk Show category)
- 2000: Award of the Polish Primate
- 2004: Melchior Award
- 2007: Beata Pawlak Award
- 2007: Nike Audience Award for Gottland
- 2007: Angelus Award finalist
- 2009: Prix Amphi in Lille
- 2009: European Book Prize for Gottland
- 2013: Journalist of the Year Award
- 2014: Knight's Cross of the Order of Polonia Restituta
- 2014: Bene Merito Honorary Badge
- 2019: Nike Award for Nie ma

== Works ==
- Niedziela, która zdarzyła się w środę (Sunday that Happened on Wednesday), Warsaw 1996;
- Na każdy temat – talk show do czytania, with Witold Orzechowski, (On Every Topic), Warsaw 1997;
- Gottland, Berlin 2008;
- 20 lat nowej Polski w reportażach według Mariusza Szczygła (20 Years of New Poland in Reportage Writing), Wołowiec 2009;
- Kaprysik. Damskie historie, Warszawa 2010;
- Zrób sobie raj (Make Your Own Paradise), Wołowiec 2010;
- Láska nebeská, Warsaw 2012;
- Projekt: prawda (Project: Truth), Warsaw 2016;
- Nie ma, Warsaw 2018
- Osobisty przewodnik po Pradze (A Personal Guide Through Praga), Warsaw 2020.
- Fakty muszą zatańczyć (The Facts Must Dance), Warsaw 2022.

In anthologies

- Kraj Raj (The Land Paradise), Warsaw 1993;
- Wysokie Obcasy. Twarze (High Heels. Faces), Warsaw 2003;
- Ouvertyr till livet, Stockholm 2003;
- La vie est un reportage. Anthologie du reportage litteraire polonais, Montricher 2005;
- Von Minsk nach Manhattan. Polnische reportagen, Vienna 2006.

== See also ==
- Polish literature
- List of Polish writers
