= Pola Gojawiczyńska =

Polish writer

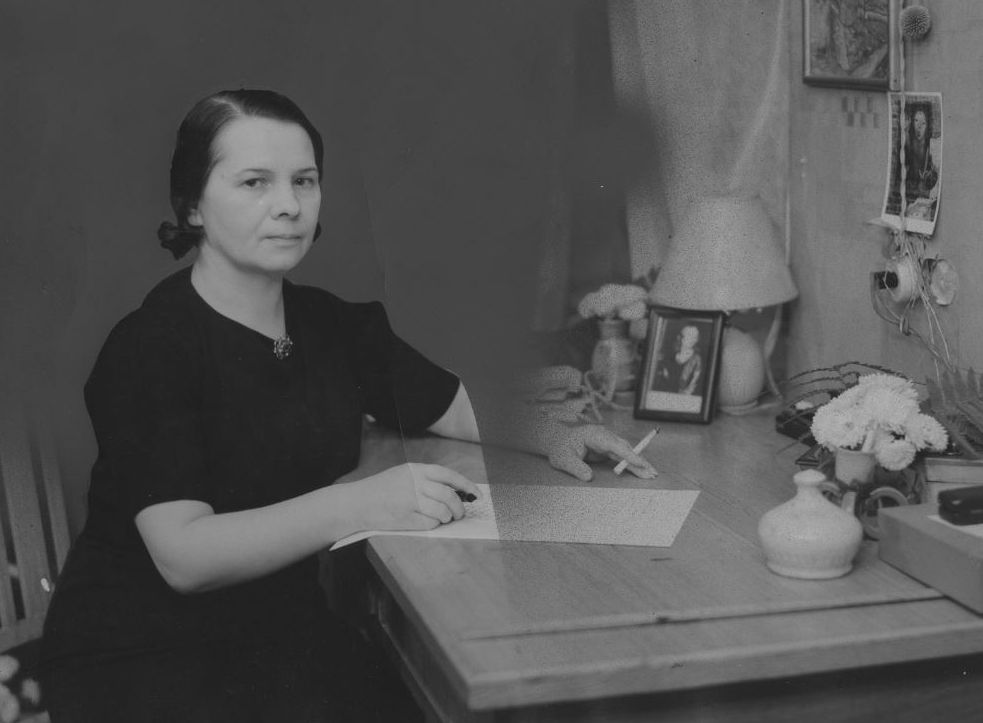
- Pola Gojawiczyńska, 1935
- Born: Apolonia Koźniewska; 1 April 1896; Warsaw, Congress Poland
- Died: 29 March 1963 (aged 66); Warsaw, Poland
- Resting place: Powązki Cemetery
- Occupation: Writer
- Writing career
- Notable works: Dziewczęta z Nowolipek; Rajska jabłoń

Pola Gojawiczyńska, real name Apolonia Gojawiczyńska, née Koźniewska (1 April 1896 – 29 March 1963) was a Polish writer.

== Biography ==
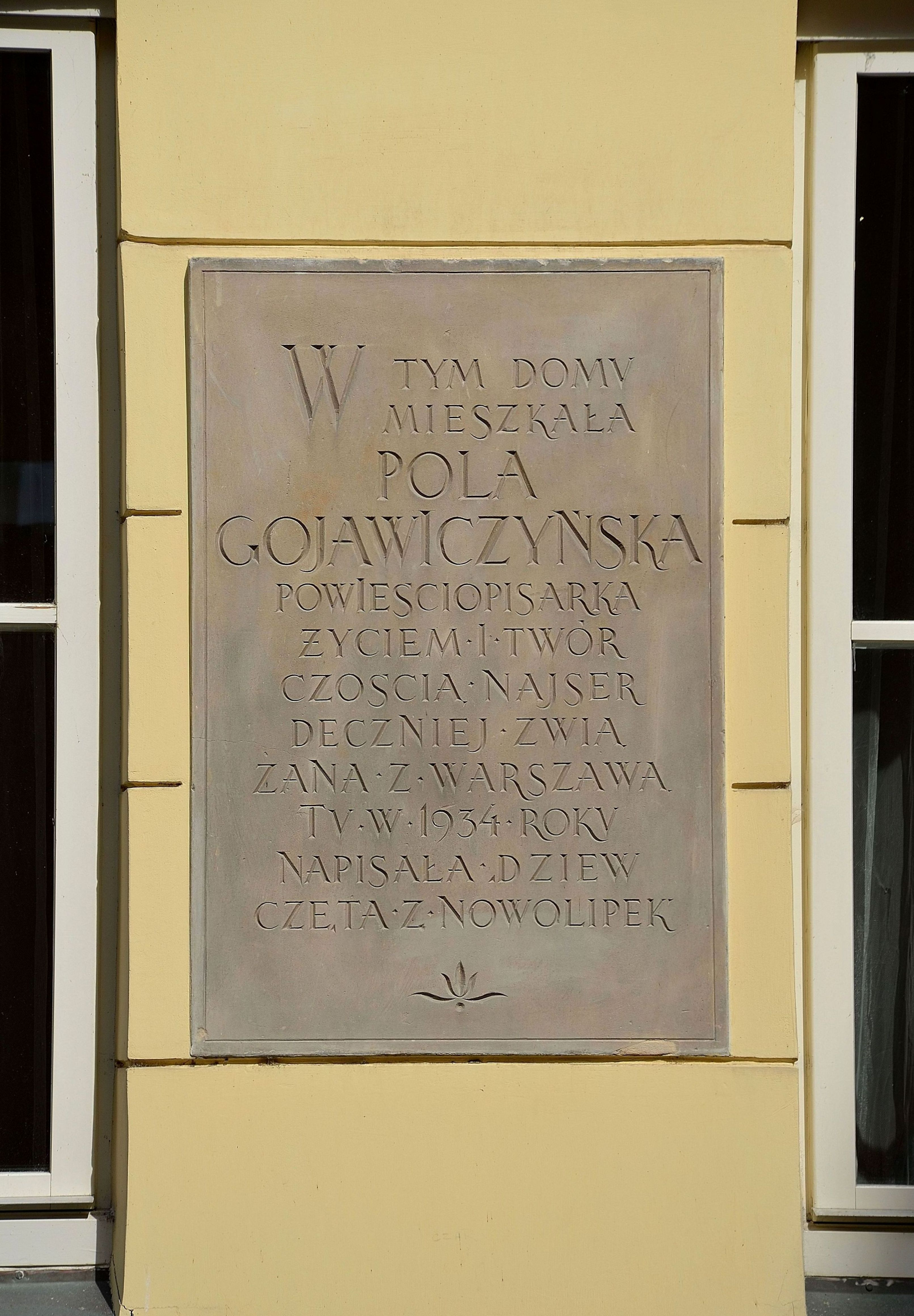
Plaque commemorating Pola Gojawiczyńska at 6/8 Brzozowa Street in Warsaw

=== Early life ===
She was born in Warsaw as a daughter of a craftsman-carpenter. She studied in a public school but was expelled in 1905 after school strike. In 1914 her family relocated to Russia.

Apolonia left alone on her own started to work as a teacher in kindergartens, libraries and amateur theatres in Warsaw and vicinities. She sent her first writing drafts to Gabriela Zapolska and gained her approval. During World War I she was active in the independence movement and was a member of Polish Military Organisation. Her first work was a short story Dwa fragmenty (Two Fragments), for which she was awarded by Echo Pragi magazine in 1915.

=== Literary progress ===
In 1920 she married Stanisław Gojawiczyński, and year later gave birth to daughter Wanda. Until 1926 lived in Bielsk Podlaski and worked in local administration. In 1931 Gojawiczyńska moved to Szarlej (currently neighbourhood of Piekary Śląskie). At that time Zofia Nałkowska read her short story Dzieciństwo (Childhood) and ensured her scholarship of National Culture Fund. In 1932 she published more works and began cooperation with Gazeta Polska.

=== During World War II ===
Gojawiczyńska spent World War II near Warsaw. In 1943 she was arrested and jailed in Pawiak prison in the section for women Serbia. She described her experience of that time in memories Krata. She was released from the prison as very ill, treated in the Saint Joseph Hospital. After the war she moved to Łódź.

She died on 29 March 1963 and is buried at Powązki Cemetery in Warsaw.

=== Summary ===
Pola Gojawiczyńska was one of the most popular women writers of the Polish literature of interwar period. Her works included psychological themes and social themes connected with proletarian and small town environment of Warsaw and Silesia. Her works Dziewczęta z Nowolipek (Girls from Nowolipki) and Rajska jabłoń (Heavenly Apple tree) were later filmed.

Gojawiczyńska was awarded Golden Cross of Merit and received award of the city of Warsaw for lifetime achievement, Commander's Cross of Polonia Restituta and Golden Badge of the Warsaw Renewal. She also received the Order of the Banner of Labour, 1st Class.

== Works ==
- Joanna (1930)
- Ucieczka (1930)
- Górnoślązaczka (1932)
- Powszedni dzień (1933)
- Ziemia Elżbiety (1934)
- Dziewczęta z Nowolipek (1935)
- Rozmowy z milczeniem (1936)
- Rajska jabłoń (1937)
- Dwoje ludzi (1938)
- Słupy ogniste (1938)
- Krata (1945)
- Stolica (1946)
- Dom na skarpie (1947)
- Miłość Gertrudy (1956)
- Opowiadania (1956)
- Stolica (1964)
- Z serca do serca (1971)
- Szybko zapomniane (1974)
