= Andrzej Stasiuk =

Polish writer & journalist (born 1960)

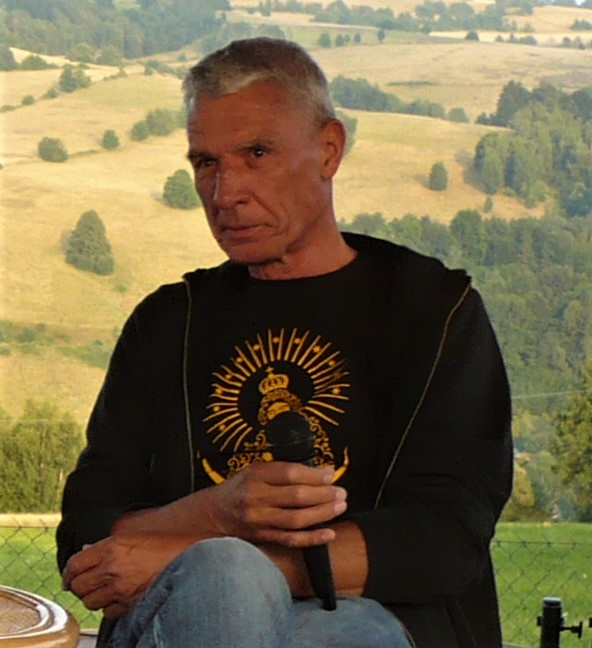
- Stasiuk in 2021
- Born: 25 September 1960 (age 65); Warsaw, Poland
- Occupations: Novelist, journalist, literary critic
- Writing career
- Language: Polish
- Period: 20th-21st century
- Notable works: The Walls of Hebron; White Raven; Tales of Galicia; Travelling to Babadag
- Notable awards: Nike Award (2005); Gdynia Literary Prize (2010); Austrian State Prize for European Literature (2016)

Andrzej Stasiuk (pronounced: [ˈand͡ʐɛj ˈstaɕuk]; born 25 September 1960 in Warsaw, Poland) is a contemporary Polish writer, journalist and literary critic. He published, among others, travel literature and essays that describe the reality of Eastern Europe and its relationship with the West. He won Kościelski Award (1995), Nike Award for Jadąc do Babadag (2005), Gdynia Literary Prize for Taksim (2010) and Austrian State Prize for European Literature (2016).

== Life and work ==
He was born on 25 September 1960 in Warsaw. After being dismissed from secondary school, Stasiuk dropped out of a vocational school too and drifted aimlessly, becoming active in the Polish pacifist movement and spending one and a half years in prison for deserting the army - in a tank, as legend has it. His experiences in prison provided him with the material for the stories in his literary debut of 1992. Entitled Mury Hebronu ("The Walls of Hebron"), it instantly established him as a premier literary talent. After a collection of Wiersze miłosne i nie ("Love and Non-Love Poems", 1994), Stasiuk's bestselling first full-length novel Biały kruk (published in English translation in 2000 as White Raven) appeared in 1995 and consolidated his position among the most successful authors in post-communist Poland.

In 1986, long before his literary breakthrough, Stasiuk left his native Warsaw and withdrew to the small hamlet of Czarne in the Beskids, a secluded part of the Carpathian mountain range in the south of Poland. Besides writing, he spends his time breeding sheep. Together with his wife, he also runs Wydawnictwo Czarne, named for its location. In addition to Stasiuk's own books, Czarne also publishes other East European authors. Czarne also re-published works by the émigré Polish author Zygmunt Haupt, thus initiating his rediscovery in Poland.

While White Raven had a straight adventure plot, Stasiuk's subsequent writing has become increasingly impressionistic and concentrated on atmospheric descriptions of his adopted home, the provincial south-east of Poland and Europe, and the lives of its inhabitants. Galician Tales, one of several works available in English (others include Nine, Dukla, Fado, and On the Road to Babadag), conveys an impression of the style developed by Stasiuk. A similar text is Dukla (1997), named after a small town near his home. Dukla marked Stasiuk's breakthrough in Germany and helped him build his most appreciative readership outside Poland, although a number of his books have been translated into several other languages.

In an interview, Stasiuk confessed his preoccupation with his area and a lack of interest in western Europe: "I haven't been to France or Spain and I've never thought about going there. I am simply interested in our part of the world, this central and eastern reality. My God, what would I be doing in France ..."

Stasiuk himself cites Marek Hłasko as a major influence; critics have compared his style of stream of consciousness travel literature to that of Jack Kerouac. Stasiuk admitted that he "always wanted to write a Slavonic On the Road and place it in a quite geographically limited and historically complicated space". Stasiuk's travelogue Jadąc do Babadag ("Travelling to Babadag"), describes a journey from the Baltic Sea down to Albania, and arguably comes close to this ideal. In Stasiuk's own words, "[t]here is no individual, human story in this book [...]. I wanted rather to write about geography, landscape, about the influence of material reality on the mind". Jadąc do Babadag received the Nike Award for the best Polish book of 2005.

A certain exception to the stylistic preferences in Stasiuk's more recent work is the 1998 novel Dziewięć ("Nine"), which is set in Warsaw and records the changes affecting urban Polish society after the collapse of communism.

Apart from (semi-) fictional writing, Stasiuk also tried his hand at literary criticism (in Tekturowy samolot / "Cardboard Aeroplane", 2000) and quasi-political essayism on the notion of Central Europe (together with the Ukrainian writer Yuri Andrukhovych) in Moja Europa. Dwa eseje o Europie zwanej środkową ("My Europe: Two essays on the Europe called 'Central'"). Stasiuk frequently contributes articles to Polish and German papers.

Stasiuk's least typical work is Noc ("Night"), subtitled "A Slavo-Germanic medical tragifarce", a stageplay commissioned by the Schauspielhaus of Düsseldorf, Germany, for a theatre festival to celebrate the enlargement of the European Union in 2004. In the guise of a grotesque crime story, Stasiuk presents two imaginary nations, symbolising Eastern and Western Europe and easily recognisable as Poles and Germans, who are entangled in an adversarial but at the same time strangely symbiotic relationship.

In 2007, Stasiuk continued to deal with the Polish-German topic in a travelogue titled Dojczland, in which he described his impressions of Germany from his reading tours there.

In an interview in 2007, Stasiuk commented on his fascination with the topic as follows:

I fear both the Germans and the Russians, I despise them both equally, and I admire them both. Maybe it's the Poles' fate to be constantly meditating on their own fate in Europe and in the world. Being a Pole means to live in perfect isolation. Being a Pole means to be the last human being east of the Rhine. Because for a Pole, the Germans are something like well-constructed machines, robots; while the Russians are already a bit like animals.

In an interview with Wprost at the close of 2011, he again discussed Europe and, in particular, Germany.

[The word Germany] has a heavy legacy, beginning with [its] etymology which means mute [in Polish], someone with which you cannot communicate because of his incomprehensible language. . . . They have really tried [to learn from the past] and are still trying, and I say this without irony and with respect, [but] when there is a group, someone has to dominate, that's how it is. Of course, the Poles would rather play this role but . . . Germany will dominate. . . . [The Germans] need to be the best at everything, and what is needed is to put them on the rails to good leadership. In other words, they need, how shall I put it, a bit of monitoring. . . .

I like Germany by contrast, it's a world that is the opposite of ours. . . . I don't admire Germany. I just like to go there from time to time to see how matter is tamed and organised. . . .

'Polishness' must also certainly be a sort of feeling of superiority. . . . Unjustified, of course. But still. . . . Without danger, without troubles, Poland is less alive[;] whenever nationalism comes knocking on the door, it feels better right away, it perks up and gets its strength back. So long live German nationalism. Which doesn't mean, does it, that we must not remain vigilant.

== Books ==
- 1992: Mury Hebronu, Warszawa: Wydawnictwo Głodnych Duchów. ("The Walls of Hebron")
- 1994: Wiersze miłosne i nie, Poznań: Biblioteka Czasu Kultury. ("Love and non-love poems")
- 1995: Biały kruk, Poznań: Biblioteka Czasu Kultury (Translated as White Raven, London: Serpent's Tail, 2000. ISBN 1-85242-667-5).
- 1995: Opowieści galicyjskie, Kraków: Znak. (Translated as Tales of Galicia, Prague: Twisted Spoon Press, 2003. ISBN 80-86264-05-X)
- 1996: Przez rzekę, Gładyszów: Czarne. ("Across the river"), ISBN 83-87391-39-5
- 1997: Dukla, Gładyszów: Czarne. ("Dukla")
- 1998: Dwie sztuki (telewizyjne) o śmierci, Gładyszów: Czarne. ("Two (television) dramas on death")
- 1998: Jak zostałem pisarzem. Próba biografii intelektualnej, Gładyszów: Czarne. ("How I became a writer: Attempt at an intellectual biography")
- 1999: Dziewięć, Gładyszów: Czarne. ISBN 83-87391-17-4 (Nine, San Diego: Harcourt Trade Publishers, 2007. ISBN 978-0-15-101064-6)
- 2000 (with Yuri Andrukhovych): Moje Europa. Dwa eseje o Europie zwanej środkową, Gładyszów: Czarne. ("My Europe: Two essays on the Europe called 'Central'"), ISBN 83-87391-44-1
- 2000: Tekturowy samolot, Gładyszów: Czarne ("Cardboard Aeroplane")
- 2000 (with Olga Tokarczuk and Jerzy Pilch): Opowieści wigilijne, Wałbrzych: Ruta. ("Christmas Tales")
- 2001: Zima, Gładyszów: Czarne ("Winter"), ISBN 83-87391-43-3
- 2004: Jadąc do Babadag, Gładyszów: Czarne ("On the Road to Babadag"), ISBN 83-89755-01-7
- 2005: Noc. Słowiańsko-germańska tragifarsa medyczna, Gładyszów: Czarne ("Night: A Slavo-Germanic medical tragifarce"), ISBN 83-89755-21-1
- 2006: Fado, Gładyszów: Czarne. ISBN 83-89755-75-0 (Fado, Champaign: Dalkey Archive Press, 2009.
- 2007: Dojczland, Gładyszów: Czarne. ISBN 978-83-7536-005-9
- 2009: Taksim, Gładyszów: Czarne. ISBN 978-83-7536-116-2
- 2010: Dziennik pisany później, Czarne. ISBN 978-83-7536-231-2
- 2012: Grochów, Czarne. ISBN 978-83-7536-288-6
- 2014: Wschód, Czarne. ISBN 978-83-7536-559-7 ("The East")
- 2021: Przewóz , Czarne. ISBN 978-83-8191-174-0

== See also ==
- Polish literature
- Gammarus stasiuki
