= Gammarus stasiuki =

Scientific classification
- Kingdom: Animalia
- Phylum: Arthropoda
- Clade: Pancrustacea
- Class: Malacostraca
- Order: Amphipoda
- Family: Gammaridae
- Genus: Gammarus
- Species: G. stasiuki

Binomial name
- Gammarus stasiuki Jażdżewski, Mamos & Grabowski, 2021

Species of crustacean

Gammarus stasiuki is a species of freshwater amphipod crustacean found in Poland, Ukraine and Romania. It was named in honour of Polish writer Andrzej Stasiuk.
