= Jarosław Marek Rymkiewicz =

Polish writer (1935–2022)

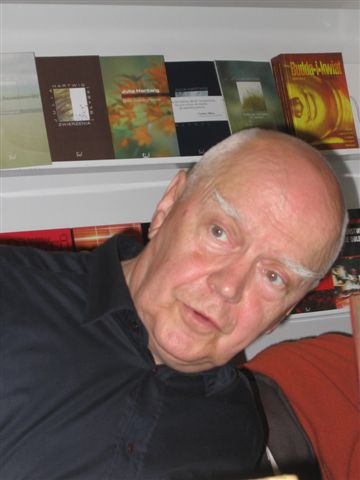
- Rymkiewicz in 2006
- Born: 13 July 1935; Warsaw, Poland
- Died: 3 February 2022 (aged 86); Warsaw, Poland
- Citizenship: Polish
- Education: University of Łódź
- Occupations: writer, critic, essayist, translator
- Writing career
- Notable awards: Nike Award (2003)

Jarosław Marek Rymkiewicz (né Szulc; 13 July 1935 – 3 February 2022) was a Polish poet, essayist, dramatist, translator and literary critic. He was the recipient of the 2003 Nike Award, Poland's most important literary prize.

== Life and work ==
Rymkiewicz was the son of Władysław Szulc, of German and Polish origin, who changed his last name to Rymkiewicz (a writer) and wife Hanna Baranowska, of German and Tatar origin (a physician).

He studied Polish philology at the University of Łódź and worked at the Literary Research Institute of Polish Academy of Sciences and Letters. As a poet, he was influenced by the traditions of classicism and the baroque. He has received multiple prizes for his novels, essays, and translations, including the Kościelski Prize (1967), S. Vincenz Prize (1985), and Polish PEN Club Prize. His volume of poetry Zachód słońca w Milanówku won the prestigious Nike Award in 2003.

Although Rymkiewicz was primarily a poet, he is better known as the author of two influential novels that contributed to the two most important debates of the 1980s: that involving the 1981 martial law and Polish-Jewish relations. His novel Rozmowy polskie latem, 1983 (Polish Conversations in Summer 1983) discusses the meaning of being Polish and the preoccupation with achieving independence. Rymkiewicz’s second novel, entitled Umschlagplatz (1988), had a greater impact. Instytut Literacki, the largest Polish émigré publishing house, originally published the novel in Paris in 1988 as it could not appear in communist Poland. It was reprinted a few times by underground publishing houses in Poland but officially appeared only in 1992 after the communists lost power in 1989. It was translated into French (1989), German (1993), and English (1994).

The novel focuses on the symbolic meaning of Umschlagplatz, which denotes a small square in German-occupied Warsaw (1939–1945) from which the Germans sent more than 300,000 Jews to their deaths, and thus a place which "may well be the only place of its kind" in the world. (p. 7, Umschlagplatz). He attempts to understand the implication of the existence of such a place for the contemporary Warsaw and the contemporary Poles. It took Rymkiewicz two years of study and research to create a detailed plan of the square. He concluded that Germans introduced the name Umschlagplatz sometime before July 1942; in pre-war Poland the place was called Transfer Square and was the centre for the Jewish wholesale trade.

He is also known as a translator, particularly of American poetry (T. S. Eliot and Wallace Stevens) and of Spanish poetry (Federico García Lorca and Pedro Calderón de la Barca).

As an essayist, Rymkiewicz concentrated on Polish history (the partition period, World War II).

He supported the conservative Law and Justice political party. Rymkiewicz died on 3 February 2022, at the age of 86.

== Publications ==
=== Poetry ===
Each year links to its corresponding "[year] in poetry" article:

- 1957: Konwencje ("Conventions")
- 1983: Ulica Mandelsztama ("Mandelstam Street")
- 1984: Mogila Ordona ("Ordon's Grave")
- 1993: Moje dzielo posmiertne ("My Posthumous Works") Krakow: Znak
- 1999: Znak niejasny, baśń półżywa ("The Unclear sign, a Half-living Legend"), Warsaw: Państwowy Instytut Wydawniczy
- 2002: Zachód słońca w Milanówku ("Sunset in Milanówek"), Warsaw: Sic!
- 2006: Do widzenia gawrony ("Good-bye, Rooks"), Warsaw: Sic!

=== Prose ===
Each year links to its corresponding "[year] in literature" article:

==== Books of Essays ====
- 1967: Czym jest klasycyzm ("What is Classicism?")
- 1968: Mysli rozne o ogrodach ("Various Thoughts about Gardens")
- 1977: Aleksander Fredro jest w zlym humorze ("Aleksander Fredro is in a Bad Mood")
- 1982: Juliusz Slowacki pyta o gozine ("Juliusz Slowacki Inquires about the Time"). Warsaw: Czytelnik
- 1983: Wielki Ksiaze ("Archduke"). Warsaw: PIW
- 1987: Zmut Warsaw: Niezalezna Oficyna Wydawnicza
- 1989: Baket
- 1994: Kilka szczegolow ("A Few Particulars"). Cracow: Arcana
- 1996: Do Snowia i dalej ("To Snow and Beyond"). Cracow: Arcana
- 2001: Lesmian. Encyklopedia ("Lesmian. Encyclopedia"). Warsaw: Sic!
- 2004: Słowacki. Encyklopedia ("Słowacki: The Encyclopaedia"), Warsaw: Sic!
- 2007: Wieszanie ("Hanging"), Warszawa: Sic!
- 2008: Kinderszenen, Warszawa: Sic!

==== Novels ====
- 1983: Rozmowy polskie latem roku 1983 ("Polish Conversations during 1983 Summer")
- 1988: Umschlagplatz

==== Comedies ====
- 1970: Krol Miesopust ("The King of Meat")
- 1971: Porwanie Europy ("The Abduction of Europe")
- 1972: Kochankowie pieklo ("The Lovers of Hell")
- 1973: Niebianskie bliznieta ("The Heavenly Twins")
- 1979: Dwor nad Narwia ("Country House on the Narwa")
