= Wojciech Kuczok =

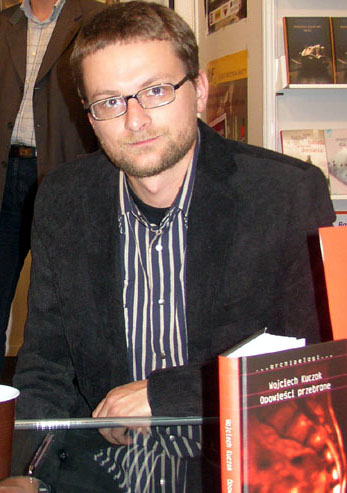
- Wojciech Kuczok in 2005
- Born: October 18, 1972; Chorzów, Poland
- Occupations: novelist, poet, screenwriter, film critic, speleologist
- Awards: Nike Award (2004); Paszport Polityki (2003)

Wojciech Kuczok (born 18 October 1972 in Chorzów) is a Polish novelist, poet, screenwriter, film critic and speleologist.

== Life and work ==
He graduated from Stefan Batory High School No. 3 in Chorzów. Previously, he attended Juliusz Słowacki High School No. 1 from which he was expelled. He graduated in film studies from the University of Silesia in Katowice.

In the 1990s he was a member of the Na Dziko poetry group. In the years 2009–2010 he was a fellow at the German Academic Exchange Service. His novel Gnój ("Muck") won Paszport Polityki Award in 2003 and the prestigious Nike Award in 2004. The book was filmed as Pręgi, with his script, and the movie won the Gdynia Film Festival, also in 2004.

Since 1992, he has published his poems and short stories in various literary magazines and newspapers including Gazeta Wyborcza, Newsweek Polska, Odra, Twórczość, Rzeczpospolita Plus Minus, Dziennik Polska-Europa-Świat, Kresy and NaGłos. Between 2000 and 2004 he worked for Tygodnik Powszechny and Kino magazines. In the years 2004–2005 he was a sports columnist at Rzeczpospolita. He also worked as a columnist for Metropol, Zwierciadło and Przegląd Sportowy.

He is also a speleologist and among his notable achievements in this field are the discoveries of the Dująca Cave in Beskid Śląski in 2005 and Twarda Cave in Kraków-Częstochowa Upland in 2010. He also took part in the exploration of the Cisęć Cave in Kraków-Częstochowa Upland as well as Lodowa Małołącka Cave in the Tatra Mountains in 1997.

The author is strongly connected with his home region of Silesia and personally is a supporter of Ruch Chorzów football club. In 2013, he married journalist and writer Agata Passent.

== Selected works ==
- Opowieści samowite, 1996
- Larmo, 1998
- Opowieści słychane, 1999
- Gnój, ("Muck"), 2003
- Widmokrąg, 2004
- Opowieści przebrane, 2005
- Senność, ("Sleepiness") 2008
- Moje projekcje, ("My Projections"), 2009
- Spiski. Przygody tatrzańskie, 2010
- Poza światłem, ("Beyond Light"), 2012
- Obscenariusz, (a collection of short stories) 2013
- Prosze mnie nie budzić, ("Please Don't Wake Me Up"), 2016
- Czarna, ("Black"), 2017
