= Tadeusz Różewicz =

Polish poet, playwright, writer, and translator (1921–2014)

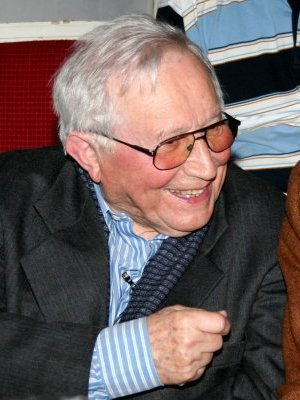
- Tadeusz Różewicz in 2006
- Born: 9 October 1921; Radomsko, Poland
- Died: 24 April 2014 (aged 92); Wrocław, Poland
- Education: Jagiellonian University
- Occupation: Writer
- Writing career
- Language: Polish
- Notable works: The Card Index; Mother Departs; The White Wedding
- Notable awards: Austrian State Prize for European Literature (1982); Struga Poetry Evenings Golden Wreath (1987); Nike Award (2000); European Prize for Literature (2007)

Tadeusz Różewicz (9 October 1921 – 24 April 2014) was a Polish poet, playwright, writer, and translator. Różewicz was in the first generation of Polish writers born after Poland regained its independence in 1918, following the century of foreign partitions. He was born in Radomsko, near Łódź, in 1921. He first published his poetry in 1938. During World War II, he served in the Polish underground Home Army. His elder brother, Janusz, also a poet, was executed by the Gestapo in 1944 for serving in the Polish resistance movement. His younger brother, Stanisław, became a noted film director and screenwriter.

== Biography and career ==
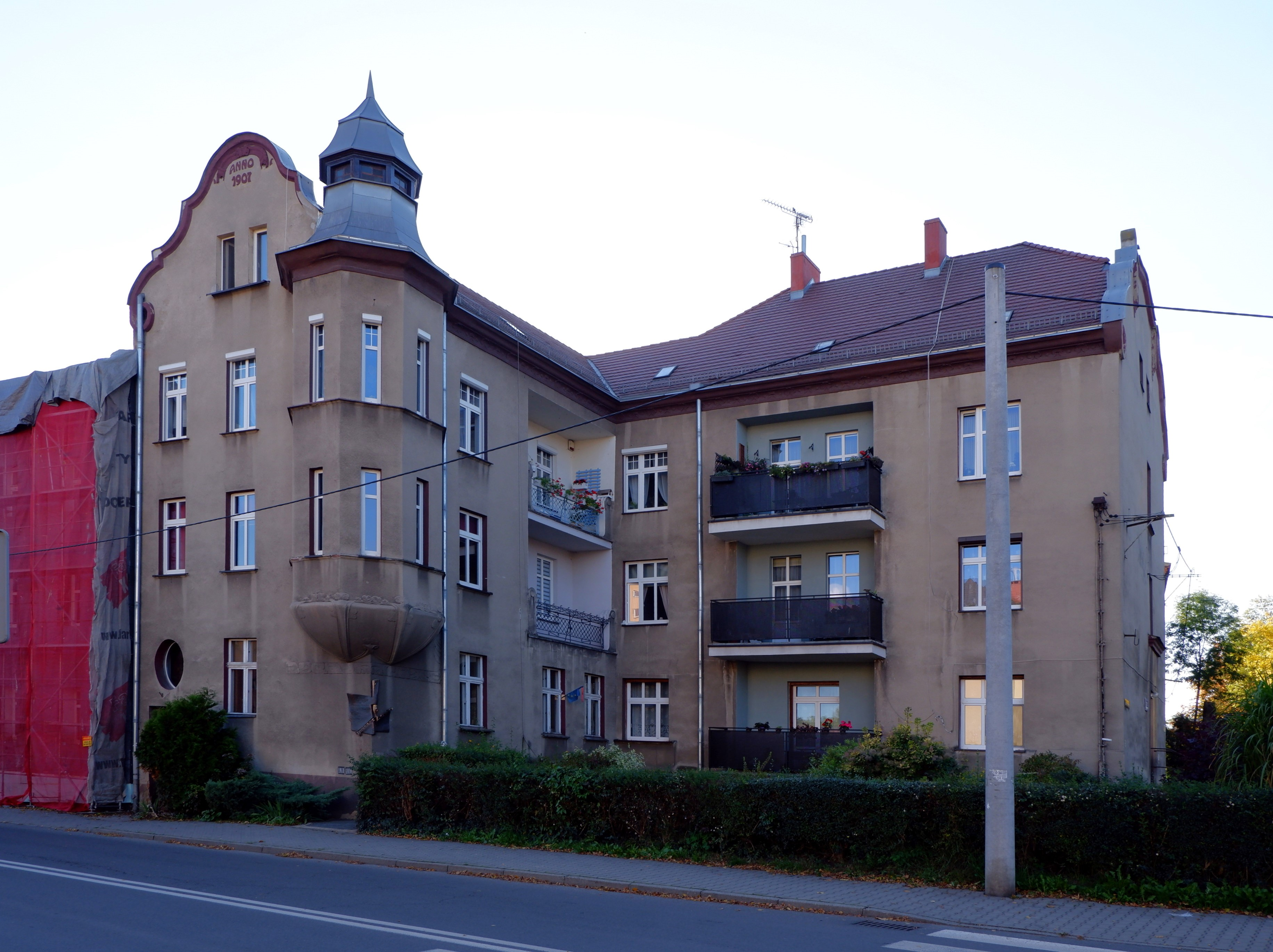
House at 28 Zygmunta Starego Street in Gliwice, where Tadeusz Różewicz lived between 1949–1968

Tadeusz Różewicz was the son of Władysław and Stefania Różewicz (née Gelbard, a Jewish convert to Catholicism). After finishing high school, Różewicz enrolled at Jagiellonian University in Kraków. He then served in World War II. After the war, he moved to Gliwice, where he lived for the following two years. In 1968, he moved to Wrocław, where he lived for the rest of his life.

Różewicz wrote and published fifteen volumes of poetry between 1944 and 1960. Czesław Miłosz wrote a poem dedicated to Różewicz and his poetry in 1948. Różewicz's debut as a playwright was in 1960, with The Card Index (Kartoteka).

He wrote over a dozen plays and several screenplays. His dramaturgical work continued to be accompanied by volumes of poetry and prose. Some of Różewicz's best known plays, other than The Card Index, include: The Interrupted Act (Akt przerywany, 1970), Birth Certificate (Świadectwo urodzenia, screenplay to an award-winning film by the same title, 1961), Left Home (Wyszedł z domu, 1965), and The White Wedding (Białe małżeństwo, 1975). His New Poems collection was nominated for the National Book Critics Circle Award in 2008.

Różewicz's works have been translated into nearly all major languages. Two of his plays were translated into English and produced at La MaMa Experimental Theatre Club in New York City during the 1960s and 1970s. In 1965, Karen Cross and Johan Holm directed a series of Różewicz's three short plays, collectively titled The Witnesses. A Village Voice review of the production reads: The first play, the most abstract, is a string of metaphors meant... to convey a view of man's condition... The second play presents a young married couple at breakfast planning their day. They work very hard at it, as if a night of sleep cuts them off drastically from life and contact must be reestablished. By means of a forced calm, a dedicated attention to trivia, and a patronizing attitude toward other people, they organize the day's activity... The key to the piece is the husband's matter-of-fact account, as he watches at the window, or two children tormenting and then destroying a kitten... The children quite coldly mutilate and murder the animal and the husband blandly but not indifferently reports the event to his wife who isn't listening. In the third play two men facing in opposite directions have a conversation of sorts. Constantly demanding attention of each other, they deliver up monologues of self-revelation which reveal next to nothing and on top of it are not being listened to. Through it all an injured dog suffers an elaborate death agony at the feet of one of the men, whose only response is to intersperse his fatuous self-revelations with bulletins on the progress of the dog's demise." In 1972, Mavis Taylor directed a production of Różewicz's The Old Woman Broods. The piece was partially funded by the New York State Council on the Arts and was performed at the College of White Plains, Hudson River Museum, and Community Action Program in Mamaroneck in addition to La MaMa's theatre in the East Village, Manhattan.

Różewicz has been regarded as "one of the most versatile and creative continuators of the Polish and international avant-garde". He was a member of the Polish Writers' Union and was nominated multiple times for the Nobel Prize in Literature. In 1987, he received the Golden Wreath at the Struga Poetry Evenings festival in Struga, Macedonia. In 2000, Różewicz received Poland's top literary prize, the Nike Award, for his book Matka odchodzi (Mother Is Leaving).

Różewicz died in Wrocław from natural causes on 24 April 2014 from. He was 92.

== Awards and decorations ==
- 1948 – Army Medal for War 1939-45
- 1955 – Gold Cross of Merit
- 1955 – State Prize, 2nd class
- 1966 – State Prize, 1st class
- 1974 – Home Army Cross
- 1974 – Polish Army Medal
- 1977 – Order of the Banner of Work, 2nd class; for his entire literary work
- 1981 – Operation Tempest medal
- 1982 – Austrian State Prize for European Literature
- 1987 – Struga Poetry Evenings Golden Wreath
- 1991 – Honorary degree from the University of Wroclaw
- 1996 – Grand Cross of the Order of Polonia Restituta
- 1997 – Golden Ball award
- 1997 – Polish PEN Club award (Jan Parandowski)
- 1999 – Honorary degree from the University of Silesia
- 2000 – Order Ecce Homo: Polish church decoration awarded by the Chapter of the Order of the Ecce Homo, "by exploring the dark side of a world full of chaos and divisions, the hope of beating the assessment everyday, seemingly impassive gray, for coming to terms with the inevitability and consistency in the pursuit of the truth about man, even worst"; for poetry that "touches the hearts and stuff".
- 2000 – Honorary doctorate from the University of Opole
- 2000 – Honorary degree from the Jagiellonian University
- 2000 – Nike Award (Polish literary award)
- 2001 – Honorary degree from the University of Warsaw
- 2005 - Gold Medal for Merit to Culture – Gloria Artis
- 2006 – Honorary doctorate from the University of Gdansk
- 2006 – Golden Sceptre award
- 2007 – Honorary degree from the Academy of Fine Arts in Wroclaw
- 2007 – European Prize for Literature
- 2008 – Laurel Award in poetry
- 2009 – Honorary degree from the Jan Kochanowski University in Kielce
- 2011 – Policy Wizard special Culture 2010 award – "Award for the fidelity of poetry and themselves. Certificate data for several subsequent epochs and questions that included the Polish literature and theater in the European debate on the most important experiences of modern man".
- 2012 – Griffin Poetry Prize international shortlist for Sobbing Superpower: Selected Poems of Tadeusz Różewicz (translated by Joanna Trzeciak)

== Selected bibliography ==
Różewicz' works include:

- 1947: Niepokój ("Anxiety")
- 1948: Czerwona rękawiczka ("The Red Glove")
- 1955: Opadly liscie z drzew ("The Leaves Have Fallen from the Trees")
- 1960: Rozmowa z księciem ("Conversation with a Prince")
- 1961: Głos Anonima ("The Anonymous Voice")
- 1962: Nic w płaszczu Prospera ("Nothing Dressed in Prospero's Cloak")
- 1964: Twarz ("The Face")
- 1968: Twarz trzecia ("The Third Face")
- 1968: Kartoteka ("The Card Index")
- 1969: Stara kobieta wysiaduje ("The Old Lady Sits Waiting")
- 1972: Na czworakach ("On All Fours")
- 1975: Białe małżeństwo ("White Wedding")
- 1979: Próba rekonstrukcji ("An Attempt to Reconstruct")
- 1982: Pułapka ("The Trap"), Warszawa: Czytelnik
- 1991: Płaskorzeźba ("Bas-Relief"), Wrocław: Wydawnictwo Dolnośląskie
- 1992: Nasz starszy brat ("Our Elder Brother")
- 1996: Zawsze fragment. Recycling ("Always a Fragment: Recycling"), Wrocław: Wydawnictwo Dolnośląskie
- 1999: Matka odchodzi ("Mother Departs"), Wrocław: Wydawnictwo Dolnośląskie
- 2001: Nożyk profesora ("The Professor's Knife"), Wrocław: Wydawnictwo Dolnośląskie
- 2002: Szara strefa ("Gray Zone"), Wrocław: Wydawnictwo Dolnośląskie
- 2004: Wyjście ("Exit"), Wrocław: Wydawnictwo Dolnośląskie
- 2007: Nauka chodzenia, Wrocław: Biuro Literackie
- 2008: Kup kota w worku, Wrocław: Biuro Literackie

== In pop culture ==
Slovenian punk band Niet used parts of Rozewicz's poem Pierwsza miłość and recreated it in their 1984 punk balade Lep dan za smrt (A Nice Day for Death). Filmmaker Werner Herzog paraphrased a line from Rozewicz's "Draft of a Modern Love Poem" in his 2007 film Encounters at the End of the World, observing that "For me, the best description of hunger is a description of bread. A poet said that once, I think." In 2008, mainstream Slovenian band Dan D remade the Niet's song for what was to become one of the 2008 top hits on Slovenian radio stations.

== Sources ==
- Wojciech Browarny: Tadeusz Różewicz and Modern Identity in Poland since the Second World War (transl. by P. Zazula, Wrocław 2019).
- Stanisław Burkot: Tadeusz Różewicz. Warszawa: Wydawnictwa Szkolne i Pedagogiczne, 1987; ISBN 978-83-02-03249-3.
- Robert Cieślak: "Oko poety". Poezja Tadeusza Różewicza wobec sztuk wizualnych. Gdańsk: słowo-obraz terytoria, 1999.
- Ewangelia odrzuconego. Szkice w 90. rocznicę urodzin Tadeusza Różewicza, red. J.M. Ruszar, Narodowe Centrum Kultury, Warszawa 2011.
- Halina Filipowicz, A Laboratory of Impure Forms: The Plays of Tadeusz Różewicz, Greenwood Publishing Group, Incorporated, 1991.
- Grażyna Sztukiecka, Umrę cały? Rozmowy w cieniu śmierci. Senilna poezja Czesława Miłosza, Tadeusza Różewicza, Zbigniewa Herberta i Jarosława Marka Rymkiewicza, Narodowe Centrum Kultury, Warszawa 2011.
- Kazimierz Wyka: Różewicz parokrotnie. Warszawa: PIW, 1977. OCLC 14677617
- Katarzyna Zechenter, 'Poet and dramatist haunted by the second world war and the suffering of Poland. Tadeusz Różewicz's obituary'. The Guardian, 4 May 2014, www.theguardian.com/books/2014/may/04/tadeusz-rozewicz
