= Krzysztof Varga =

Writer and journalist (born 1968)

- Krzysztof Varga, 2015
- Born: 21 March 1968 (age 58); Warszawa
- Occupations: Writer, journalist
- Notable work: Nagrobek z lastryko, Gulasz z turula

Krzysztof Varga (born 21 March 1968) is a writer, columnist and literary critic.

== Biography ==
He was born in Warsaw, the son of Béla Varga and Jadwiga Staniszewska. From 1987 to 1992, he studied Polish philology at the University of Warsaw. From 1991 to 1994 he worked at the Staromiejski Dom Kultury in Warsaw. From 1992 he worked at Gazeta Wyborcza as literary reviewer and columnist. From 2017 he published in Newsweek Polska; from 2020 he has been running a column there.

== Books ==
Source.

- Pijany anioł na skrzyżowaniu ulic. Warszawa: Staromiejski Dom Kultury. 1993.
- Chłopaki nie płaczą. Warszawa: Lampa i Iskra Boża. 1996.
- Bildungsroman. Warszawa: Lampa i Iskra Boża. 1997.
- Śmiertelność. Wołowiec: Wydawnictwo Czarne. 1998.
- 45 pomysłów na powieść. Strony B singli 1992–1996. Wołowiec: Wydawnictwo Czarne. 1998.
- Tequila. Warszawa-Wołowiec: Wydawnictwo Czarne oraz Lampa i Iskra Boża. 2001.
- Karolina. Wołowiec: Wydawnictwo Czarne. 2002.
- Nagrobek z lastryko. Wołowiec: Wydawnictwo Czarne. 2007. ISBN 978838975592-6.
- Gulasz z turula. Wołowiec: Wydawnictwo Czarne. 2008. ISBN 978-83-7536-040-0.
- Aleja Niepodległości. Wołowiec: Wydawnictwo Czarne. 2010. ISBN 978-83-7536-135-3.
- Trociny. Wołowiec: Wydawnictwo Czarne. 2012. ISBN 978-83-7536-366-1.
- Polska mistrzem Polski. Warszawa: Wydawnictwo Agora. 2013.
- Czardasz z mangalicą. Wołowiec: Wydawnictwo Czarne. 2014. ISBN 978-83-7536-732-4.
- Masakra. Warszawa: Wydawnictwo Wielka Litera. 2015.
- Langosz w jurcie. Wołowiec: Wydawnictwo Czarne. 2016. ISBN 978-83-8049-375-9.
- Egzorcyzmy księdza Wojciecha. Warszawa: Wielka Litera. 2017.
- Sonnenberg. Wołowiec: Wydawnictwo Czarne. 2018. ISBN 978-83-8049-655-2.
- Księga dla starych urwisów. Wszystko, czego jeszcze nie wiecie o Edmundzie Niziurskim. Warszawa: Wydawnictwo Czerwone i Czarne. 2019.
- Dziennik hipopotama. Warszawa: Iskry. 2020.
- Ostrygi i kamienie. Opowieści o Normandii, Bretanii i Pikardii. Sękowa: Czarne. 2024. ISBN 978-83-8191-906-7.
- Śmiejący się pies. Czarne. 2025. ISBN 978-83-8396-056-2.

== Accolades ==
In 2014 he was awarded Knight's Cross of the Order of Polonia Restituta. He earned three nominations to Nike Award; in 2008 he was a finalist of the Nike Award for Nagrobek z lastryko; in 2009 he received Nike Readers' Award for Gulasz z turula.
