= Nike Award =

Polish literary award

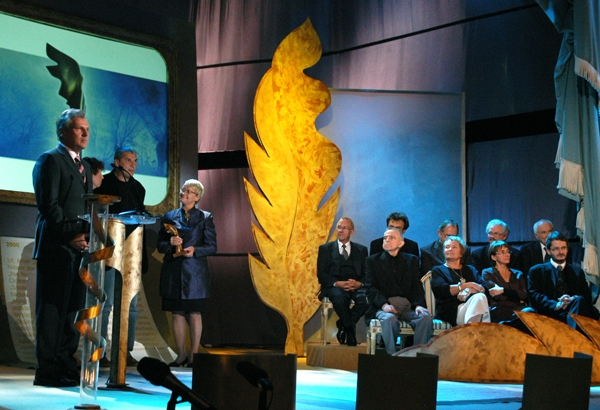
- 2005 Nike Award ceremony with former Polish president Aleksander Kwaśniewski
- Awarded for: best book of a single living author writing in the Polish language published the previous year
- Country: Poland
- Presented by: Gazeta Wyborcza and Agora Foundation
- Reward: PLN 100,000 ($25,000)
- First award: 1997; 29 years ago

The Nike Literary Award (Polish: Nagroda Literacka „Nike", pronounced [ˈnikɛ]) is a literary prize awarded each year for the best book of a single living author writing in Polish and published the previous year. It is widely considered the most important award for Polish literature. Established in 1997 and funded by Gazeta Wyborcza, Poland's second largest daily paper, and the consulting company NICOM, it is conferred annually in October. It is open for nominees from all literary genres, including non-fiction essays and autobiographies.

Each year, a nine-member jury selects the laureate in a three-stage process. Twenty official nominees are accepted in May, out of which seven finalists are declared in September. The final decision does not take place until the day of the award ceremony in October. The award consists of a statuette referring to the Greek goddess Nike, designed by the prominent Polish sculptor Kazimierz Gustaw Zemła, and a cash prize of currently PLN 100,000 (ca. $25,000).

In addition to the main jury award, there is an audience award based on the outcome of a vote on the seven official finalists conducted by Gazeta Wyborcza. The verdicts of the audience and jury have converged only occasionally (2000, 2001, 2004, 2015, 2018, 2019 and 2021). Two laureates of the award have been awarded the Nobel Prize in Literature: Czesław Miłosz (1980) and Olga Tokarczuk (2018). Tokarczuk and Wiesław Myśliwski are the only individuals to date to have received the Nike Award twice.

== Laureates ==
Title and details of English translation stated where available.

=== Jury award ===
Year	Author	Picture	Title	English title	Genre(s)	Ref.
2026	Szczepan Twardoch		Null	Null	Novel	
2025	Eliza Kącka		Wczoraj byłaś zła na zielono	Yesterday You Were Angry In Green	Essay	
2024	Urszula Kozioł		Raptularz	– Diary	Poetry	
2023	Zyta Rudzka		Ten się śmieje kto ma zęby	Only Those with Teeth Can Smile	Novel	
2022	Jerzy Jarniewicz		Mondo Cane	Mondo Cane	Poetry	
2021	Zbigniew Rokita		Kajś. Opowieść o Górnym Śląsku	Kajś: A Tale of Upper Silesia	Reportage	
2020	Radek Rak		Baśń o wężowym sercu	The Snake Heart Fairy Tale	Fantasy novel	
2019	Mariusz Szczygieł		Nie ma	No There	Reportage	
2018	Marcin Wicha		Rzeczy, których nie wyrzuciłem	Things I Didn't Throw Out	Collection of essays	
2017	Cezary Łazarewicz		Żeby nie było śladów. Sprawa Grzegorza Przemyka	So There'll Be No Traces. Grzegorz Przemyk's Case	Reportage	
2016	Bronka Nowicka	–	Nakarmić kamień	To Feed a Stone	Poetry	
2015	Olga Tokarczuk		Księgi Jakubowe	The Books of Jacob	Novel	
2014	Karol Modzelewski		Zajeździmy kobyłę historii. Wyznania poobijanego jeźdźca	We'll Ride the Mare of History to the Ground: Confessions of a Bruised Rider	Autobiography	
2013	Joanna Bator		Ciemno, prawie noc	Dark, Almost Night	Novel	
2012	Marek Bieńczyk		Książka twarzy	Book of Faces	Collection of essays	
2011	Marian Pilot		Pióropusz	Plume	Novel	
2010	Tadeusz Słobodzianek	–	Nasza klasa	Our Class	Play	
2009	Eugeniusz Tkaczyszyn-Dycki		Piosenka o zależnościach i uzależnieniach	A Song of Dependencies and Addictions	Poetry	
2008	Olga Tokarczuk		Bieguni	Flights	Novel	
2007	Wiesław Myśliwski		Traktat o łuskaniu fasoli	Treatise on Shelling Beans	Novel	
2006	Dorota Masłowska		Paw królowej	The Queen's Peacock	Novel	
2005	Andrzej Stasiuk		Jadąc do Babadag	Travelling to Babadag	Novel	
2004	Wojciech Kuczok		Gnój	Muck	Novel	
2003	Jarosław Marek Rymkiewicz		Zachód słońca w Milanówku	Sunset in Milanówek	Poetry	
2002	Joanna Olczak-Roniker		W ogrodzie pamięci	In the Garden of Memory	Novel	
2001	Jerzy Pilch		Pod Mocnym Aniołem	The Strong Angel Inn	Novel	
2000	Tadeusz Różewicz		Matka odchodzi	Mother Is Leaving	Poetry	
1999	Stanisław Barańczak		Chirurgiczna precyzja. Elegie i piosenki z lat 1995–1997	Surgical Precision	Poetry	
1998	Czesław Miłosz		Piesek przydrożny	Road-side Dog	Poetry	
1997	Wiesław Myśliwski		Widnokrąg	Horizon	Novel	

=== Audience award ===
Year	Author	Title	English title	Genre(s)
2026	Szczepan Twardoch	Null	Null	Novel
2025	Eliza Kącka	Wczoraj byłaś zła na zielono	Yesterday You Were Angry In Green	Essay
2024	Michał Witkowski	Wiara. Autobiografia	Faith: An Autobiography	Autobiography
2023	Grzegorz Piątek	Gdynia obiecana. Miasto, modernizm, modernizacja 1920-1939	Gdynia Promised: City, Modernism, Modernization 1920-1939	Reportage
2022	Joanna Ostrowska	Oni. Homoseksualiści w czasie II wojny światowej	Them. Homosexuals in WWII	Reportage
2021	Zbigniew Rokita	Kajś. Opowieść o Górnym Śląsku	Kajś. A Tale of Upper Silesia	Reportage
2020	Joanna Gierak-Onoszko	27 śmierci Toby'ego Obeda	27 Deaths of Toby Obed	Collection of reportages
2019	Mariusz Szczygieł	Nie ma	No There	Reportage
2018	Marcin Wicha	Rzeczy, których nie wyrzuciłem	The Things I Didn't Throw Away	Collection of essays
2017	Stanisław Łubieński	Dwanaście srok za ogon	The Birds They Sang	Collection of essays
2016	Magdalena Grzebałkowska	1945. Wojna i pokój	1945. War and Peace	Reportage
2015	Olga Tokarczuk	Księgi Jakubowe	The Books of Jacob	Novel
2014	Ignacy Karpowicz	Ości	Bones	Novel
2013	Szczepan Twardoch	Morfina	Morphine	Novel
2012	Andrzej Franaszek	Miłosz: biografia	Miłosz: A Biography	Biography
2011	Sławomir Mrożek	Dziennik 1962–1969	Journals 1962–1969	Diary
2010	Magdalena Grochowska	Jerzy Giedroyc. Do Polski ze snu	Jerzy Giedroyc. To Poland from Dream	Biography
2009	Krzysztof Varga	Gulasz z turula	Turul Goulash	Collection of essays
2008	Olga Tokarczuk	Bieguni	Flights	Novel
2007	Mariusz Szczygieł	Gottland	Gottland	Collection of reportages
2006	Wisława Szymborska	Dwukropek	Colon	Poetry
2005	Ryszard Kapuściński	Podróże z Herodotem	Journeys with Herodotus	Autobiography
2004	Wojciech Kuczok	Gnój	Muck	Novel
2003	Dorota Masłowska	Wojna polsko-ruska pod flagą biało-czerwoną	Snow White and Russian Red	Novel
2002	Olga Tokarczuk	Gra na wielu bębenkach	Playing on Many Drums	Collection of short stories
2001	Jerzy Pilch	Pod Mocnym Aniołem	The Strong Angel Inn	Novel
2000	Tadeusz Różewicz	Matka odchodzi	Mother Is Leaving	Poetry
1999	Olga Tokarczuk	Dom dzienny, dom nocny	House of Day, House of Night	Novel
1998	Zygmunt Kubiak	Mitologia Greków i Rzymian	The Mythology of the Greeks and Romans	History
1997	Olga Tokarczuk	Prawiek i inne czasy	Primeval and Other Times	Novel

== Most nominations (1997–2022) ==
- 10 nominations – Jerzy Pilch
- 9 nominations – Andrzej Stasiuk
- 7 nominations – Tadeusz Różewicz
- 6 nominations – Julia Hartwig, Ewa Lipska, Olga Tokarczuk
- 5 nominations – Jacek Dehnel, Piotr Matywiecki, Czesław Miłosz, Jacek Podsiadło, Ryszard Przybylski, Jarosław Marek Rymkiewicz, Magdalena Tulli
- 4 nominations – Marek Bieńczyk, Michał Głowiński, Henryk Grynberg, Ignacy Karpowicz, Urszula Kozioł, Marcin Świetlicki, Eugeniusz Tkaczyszyn-Dycki, Krzysztof Varga, Adam Zagajewski
- 3 nominations – Justyna Bargielska, Joanna Bator, Wojciech Bonowicz, Sylwia Chutnik, Włodzimierz Kowalewski, Zbigniew Kruszyński, Dorota Masłowska, Wiesław Myśliwski, Joanna Olczak-Roniker, Tomasz Różycki, Małgorzata Szejnert, Wisława Szymborska, Adam Wiedemann, Michał Witkowski

== Jury ==
Members of the jury included, among others Przemysław Czapliński (1997–2001 and 2011–2013) and Masza Potocka (2016–2017 and 2023–2024)

== See also ==
- Polish literature
- List of Polish writers
- List of Polish poets
- Angelus Award
- Zbigniew Herbert International Literary Award
- Ryszard Kapuściński Award for Literary Reportage
