= Maurycy Mochnacki =

Polish literary critic, historian and activist (1803–1834)

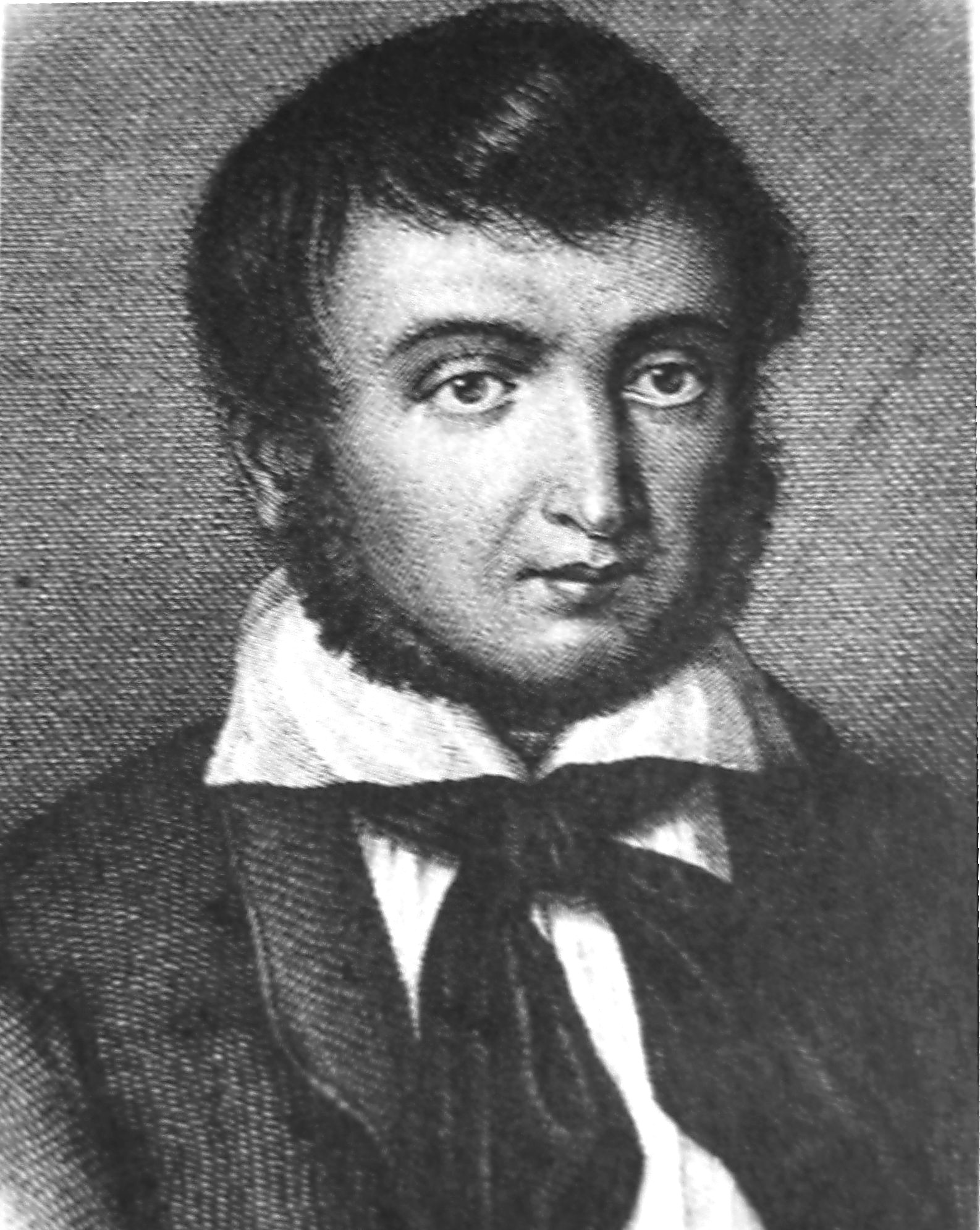
- Mochnacki ca. 1834
- Born: 13 September 1803; Bojaniec, Habsburg Monarchy
- Died: 20 December 1834 (aged 31); Auxerre, France
- Resting place: Powązki Military Cemetery
- Education: University of Warsaw
- Occupations: literary critic, publicist, journalist

Maurycy Mochnacki (13 September 1803 in Bojaniec near Żółkiew – 20 December 1834 in Auxerre) was a Polish literary, theatre and music critic, publicist, journalist, pianist, historian and independence activist. One of the main theorists of Polish Romanticism. He joined the November Uprising in 1830 taking part in several battles for example at Stoczek, Ostrołęka, Grochów and Wawer. For that activity he was promoted to officer rank and awarded the War Order of Virtuti Militari, which is the highest Polish military decoration.

== Life ==
Maurycy Mochnacki was born in Bojaniec, which after the partitions of Poland became part of the Austrian Habsburg Monarchy and is now western Ukraine. Mochnacki came from a patriotic and politically active family. Mochnacki's father, a lawyer, land-owner, and participant of the Kościuszko Insurrection, facilitated the education of his children. Maurycy learned classical and contemporary literature, history and foreign languages from home. In 1815, the family moved to Lwów (Lemberg, Lviv), where he took music classes and also played the piano and violin. In 1819, the family had moved again, this time down in Czersk near Warsaw. There, Maurycy studied at a prestigious high school, and continued into law studies at Warsaw University, but was subsequently expelled for striking a policeman who requested him to extinguish his pipe. In a further blow to the family's reputation, he was sentenced to 14 days hard labour, working with criminal offenders in the Belweder Park. At the end of 1823, he was arrested and imprisoned in a Carmelite Convent for belonging to a secret organization called ‘the Union of Free Polish Brothers’. To get the freedom, he had to write a memorial in which he accused the education system in Congress Poland of political indoctrination of the youth and the advocacy of liberalism. Shortly after his release, he was forced to work at censorship office but lost the job after six months. Those episodes would have a profound influence on his future life.

A legal career now impossible, Maurycy Mochnacki concentrated on art and political activity. His family flat in Warsaw became a meeting place for Polish patriots, writers and musicians, such as Fryderyk Chopin or Maria Szymanowska. Mochnacki was considered a fine pianist but preferred writing essays on Mozart, Beethoven or Weber to performing. At the time he started writing an essay titled 'On the Spirit and the Sources of poetry in Poland', in which he argued that a national literature could only grow from Romantic roots. He also believed that Polish literature should not be a copy of French or German models; instead, writers would have to find Polish version of Romanticism, rooted in national tradition, history and spirit. Mochnacki had a strong influence on the birth of modern literary criticism in Poland. He noted the connection between literary criticism, philosophy and aesthetics. He introduced philosophical notion, for example Georg Wilhelm Friedrich Hegel's, into literary criticism. He wrote about novels and poetry of great Polish Romantic writers such as Adam Mickiewicz. Mochnacki believed that literature played a major role in society and was capable of changing people's thinking, and also it could play a role in creating a new country.

Mochnacki worked in several magazines. From 1827 until 1829 he was an editor at Kurier Polski where he criticized established writers. In 1830 he took part in preparations for the November Uprising against Russian rule in Poland. During the November Uprising he set up a political club, called the Patriotic Society and Mochnacki was once again was imprisoned for being against an insurrection's leader Józef Chłopicki. At the same time he studied German philosophy, especially books by Schlegel and Schiller. He thought that literature was more than just an artistic pursuit, it had a mission and a real influence on the political situation.

In 1831, after fighting in numerous battles, Mochnacki was wounded. During his military service, he was promoted to an officer's rank and awarded Poland's highest military order – the Virtuti Militari medal. After the failure of the uprising he emigrated with his brother to France where he died of tuberculosis in 1834.

In 2021, Mochnacki's remains were transferred to Poland from France and were buried at the Powązki Military Cemetery in Warsaw after a ceremonial service held at the Field Cathedral of the Polish Army attended by Polish PM Mateusz Morawiecki.

== See also ==
- Great Emigration
- Kazimierz Brodziński
- Adam Jerzy Czartoryski
- Stanisław Kostka Potocki
- Juliusz Słowacki

== Bibliography ==
- Davies, N. (1982). God's playground, a history of Poland (Volume II, 1795 to the Present). New York: Columbia University Press.
- Krzyżanowski, J. (1978). History of Polish literature. Warszawa: Polish Scientific Publishers.
- Strzyżewski, M. (2004). Maurycy Mochnacki Rozprawy Literackie. Wrocław: Ossolineum.
