= Olga Tokarczuk bibliography =

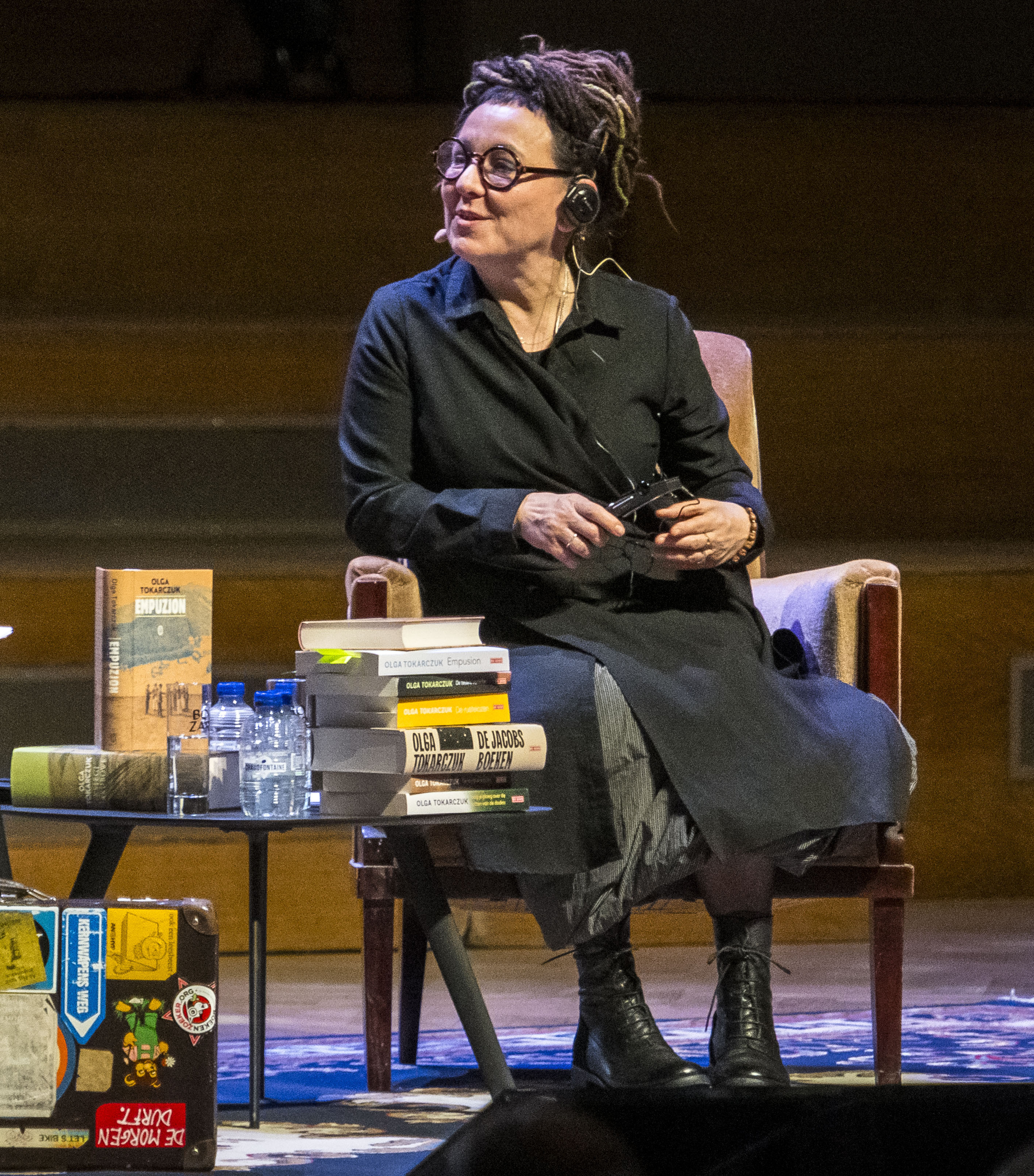
- Olga Tokarczuk with a stack of her books during an interview in 2025
- Novels↙: 10
- Collections↙: 5

This is a list of works by the Polish Nobel Prize winning writer Olga Tokarczuk. Among her publications are ten novels, of which only six were translated to English (by Antonia Lloyd-Jones and Jennifer Croft), and multiple short stories collections, none of which were translated to English. She also wrote several non-fiction, poetry, children's books and other works.

== List of publications ==
=== Novels ===
Title	Publisher	Year of publication
Podróż ludzi Księgi (English: The Journey of the Book-People, not translated)	Przedświt	1993
Podróż ludzi Księgi (English: The Journey of the Book-People, not translated)	W.A.B.	1996, 1998
Podróż ludzi Księgi (English: The Journey of the Book-People, not translated)	Wydawnictwo Literackie	2019
E.E. (not translated into English)	State Publishing Institute	1995
E.E. (not translated into English)	Ruta	1999
E.E. (not translated into English)	Wydawnictwo Literackie	2005, 2015, 2020
Prawiek i inne czasy (English: Primeval and Other Times)	W.A.B.	1996, 1998
Prawiek i inne czasy (English: Primeval and Other Times)	Świat Książki	1997
Prawiek i inne czasy (English: Primeval and Other Times)	Ruta	2000
Prawiek i inne czasy (English: Primeval and Other Times)	Polityka (weekly)	2005
Prawiek i inne czasy (English: Primeval and Other Times)	Wydawnictwo Literackie	2007, 2015, 2020
Prawiek i inne czasy (English: Primeval and Other Times)	Twisted Spoon Press, Prague (English; trans. Antonia Lloyd-Jones)	2010
Dom dzienny, dom nocny (English: House of Day, House of Night)	Ruta	1998
Dom dzienny, dom nocny (English: House of Day, House of Night)	Wydawnictwo Literackie	2015, 2020
Dom dzienny, dom nocny (English: House of Day, House of Night)	Granta Books, London (English; trans. Antonia Lloyd-Jones)	2002
Dom dzienny, dom nocny (English: House of Day, House of Night)	Northwestern University Press, Evanston (English; trans. Antonia Lloyd-Jones)	2003
Dom dzienny, dom nocny (English: House of Day, House of Night)	Fitzcarraldo Editions, London (English; trans. Antonia Lloyd-Jones)	2025
Ostatnie historie (English: Final Stories, not translated)	Wydawnictwo Literackie	2004, 2015, 2020
Anna In w grobowcach świata (English: Anna In in the Tombs of the World, not translated)	Znak (publisher)	2006
Anna In w grobowcach świata (English: Anna In in the Tombs of the World, not translated)	Wydawnictwo Literackie	2015, 2020
Bieguni (English: Flights)	Wydawnictwo Literackie	2007, 2015, 2019
Bieguni (English: Flights)	Fitzcarraldo Editions, London (English; trans. Jennifer Croft)	2017
Bieguni (English: Flights)	Riverhead Books, New York (English; trans. Jennifer Croft)	2018
Prowadź swój pług przez kości umarłych (English: Drive Your Plow Over the Bones of the Dead)	Wydawnictwo Literackie	2009, 2017, 2022
Prowadź swój pług przez kości umarłych (English: Drive Your Plow Over the Bones of the Dead)	Fitzcarraldo Editions, London (English; trans. Antonia Lloyd-Jones)	2018
Prowadź swój pług przez kości umarłych (English: Drive Your Plow Over the Bones of the Dead)	Riverhead Books, New York (English; trans. Antonia Lloyd-Jones)	2019
Księgi Jakubowe (English: The Books of Jacob)	Wydawnictwo Literackie	2014, 2021, 2024
Księgi Jakubowe (English: The Books of Jacob)	Fitzcarraldo Editions, London (English; trans. Jennifer Croft)	2021
Księgi Jakubowe (English: The Books of Jacob)	Riverhead Books, New York (English; trans. Jennifer Croft)	2022
Empuzjon (English: The Empusium)	Wydawnictwo Literackie	2022
Empuzjon (English: The Empusium)	Fitzcarraldo Editions, London (English; trans. Antonia Lloyd-Jones)	2024
Empuzjon (English: The Empusium)	Riverhead Books, New York (English; trans. Antonia Lloyd-Jones)	2024

=== Short story collections ===
Title	Publisher	Year of publication	Contents
Szafa (książka) (English: The Wardrobe, collection not translated)	Ruta	1997	Szafa; Numery; Deus Ex
Szafa (książka) (English: The Wardrobe, collection not translated)	Wydawnictwo Literackie	2005, 2016, 2020	Szafa; Numery; Deus Ex
Opowieści wigilijne (Christmas Tales)	Czarna Ruta, Wałbrzych	2000	Pastorałka Don Juana – Jerzy Pilch; Opowieść wigilijna – Andrzej Stasiuk; Profesor Andrews w Warszawie – Olga Tokarczuk
Gra na wielu bębenkach (English: Playing on Many Drums: 19 Stories, collection not translated)	Ruta	2001	Otwórz oczy, już nie żyjesz; Szkocki miesiąc; Podmiot; Wyspa; Bardo. Szopka; Najbrzydsza Kobieta Świata; Wieczór autorski; Zdobycie Jerozolimy. Raten 1675; Che Guevara; Skoczek; Profesor Andrews w Warszawie; Ariadna na Naksos; Glicynia; Tancerka; Wróżenie z fasoli; Żurek; Życzenie Sabiny; Próba generalna; Gra na wielu bębenkach
Gra na wielu bębenkach (English: Playing on Many Drums: 19 Stories, collection not translated)	Wydawnictwo Literackie	2015, 2020	Otwórz oczy, już nie żyjesz; Szkocki miesiąc; Podmiot; Wyspa; Bardo. Szopka; Najbrzydsza Kobieta Świata; Wieczór autorski; Zdobycie Jerozolimy. Raten 1675; Che Guevara; Skoczek; Profesor Andrews w Warszawie; Ariadna na Naksos; Glicynia; Tancerka; Wróżenie z fasoli; Żurek; Życzenie Sabiny; Próba generalna; Gra na wielu bębenkach
Opowiadania bizarne (English: Tales of the Bizarre, collection not translated)	Wydawnictwo Literackie	2018	Pasażer; Zielone dzieci; Przetwory; Szwy; Wizyta; Prawdziwa historia; Serce; Transfugium; Góra Wszystkich Świętych; Kalendarz ludzkich świąt
Profesor Andrews w Warszawie. Wyspa	Wydawnictwo Literackie	2018	Profesor Andrews w Warszawie; Wyspa

=== Short stories ===
Title	Place of publication	Year of publication
Grzech, o którym śnili prawosławni	Ex Libris 83	1995
Grzech, o którym śnili prawosławni	Nowy Nurt 13	1995
Obcy	Arkusz 1/1995	1995
Obcy	Stronica Śnieżnicka 1/2000	2000
Nasz dom na końcu i w środku świata	Odra (magazine) 3/1995	1995
Wielka podróż z Wałbrzycha do Warszawy w ważnych interesach (Opowiadanie znalezione w Skrzynce)	Fraza (magazine) 9/1995	1995
Von Magnus	Fraza 27-28/2000	2000
Palec Stalina	Kafka 3/2001	2001
Najbrzydsza Kobieta Świata	Studium 4/2001	2001
Przejście	Pogranicza 5/2001	2001
Fryzjer	Arkusz 6/2002	2002
Loteria	Wysokie Obcasy 23	2002
Warszawa. Silnik diesla	Pomosty 8/2003	2003
Rubież	anthology PL +50. Historie przyszłości, Wydawnictwo Literackie	2004
Rubież	anthology NieObcy, Agora	2015
Głosy, śmiechy, rozmowy	Lampa (magazine) 3/2004	2004
Głosy, śmiechy, rozmowy	anthology Spotkania z Jungiem, Eneteia	2007
Notatki o Franku	Twórczość 7/2006	2006
Psy kochane stają się bardzo „ludzkie”	anthology O psach, kotach i aniołach, Wydawnictwo Literackie	2006
Droga chlebowa	Tygodnik Powszechny 51-52/2007	2007
Pomiędzy	catalog Zuzanna Janin. All that music, Arsenal Municipal Gallery in Poznań	2009
Człowiek, który nie lubił swojej pracy	anthology 1989. Dziesięć opowiadań o burzeniu murów, Hokus Pokus	2009
Przetwory na życie (na niestrawność)	2011. Antologia współczesnych polskich opowiadań, Wydawnictwo Forma	2011
Gość	website of the "Jeszcze żywy KARP" campaign, Klub Gaja	2011
Psiakrew	anthology Zapomniane słowa, Wydawnictwo Czarne	2014
Yente (English; trans. Jennifer Croft; excerpted from The Books of Jacob)	The New Yorker 97 (29), pp. 60–65	2021

=== Other works ===
Title	Publisher / Place of publication	Year of publication	Notes
Miasto w lustrach (City in Mirrors)	Zarząd Główny Związku Socjalistycznej Młodzieży Polskiej, Warsaw (as supplement to Okolice 10/1989)	1989	poetry chapbook
Lekcja pisania (collective work)	Wydawnictwo Czarne	1998	essay
Skarb	Dialog 4/2000	2000	screenplay
Lalka i perła (The Doll and the Pearl)	Wydawnictwo Literackie	2001	essay
Lalka i perła (The Doll and the Pearl)	Wydawnictwo Literackie (with Czesław Miłosz)	2019	essay, joint edition with Miłosz
Moment niedźwiedzia (The Moment of the Bear)	Krytyka Polityczna Publishing	2012	essay collection
Zgubiona dusza (English: The Lost Soul)	Format (publisher), Wrocław	2017	Picture book, illustrations by Joanna Concejo
Zgubiona dusza (English: The Lost Soul)	Seven Stories Press, New York (English; trans. Antonia Lloyd-Jones)	2021	English edition, ISBN 978-1-64421-035-2
Wielogłos o Zagładzie (collective work)	MOCAK	2018	answers to 8 questions about the Holocaust
Nieswojość (collective work)	Wydawnictwo Warstwy	2019	essay Bezimienny krajobraz
Czuły narrator (The Tender Narrator)	Wydawnictwo Literackie	2020	collection of essays and lectures, including the Nobel lecture
Erotica 2022	Netflix	2020	screenplay for the segment Znikanie pani B.
Pan Wyrazisty (English: Mr. Distinctive)	Format	2023	word-and-image book with illustrations by Joanna Concejo
Pan Wyrazisty (English: Mr. Distinctive)	Seven Stories Press, New York (English; trans. Antonia Lloyd-Jones)	2025	English edition, illustrations by Joanna Concejo
ahat ilī. Siostra bogów	słowo/obraz terytoria	2024	opera libretto with commentary by Zbigniew Mikołejko

=== Interviews and conversations ===
Title	Author	Publisher	Year of publication	Notes
Kontrapunkt: Rozmowy o książkach	Przemysław Czapliński Piotr Śliwiński	Obserwator	1999	transcript of conversation Chciałabym pilnować środka
Historia literatury polskiej w rozmowach. XX–XXI wiek	Stanisław Bereś	W.A.B.	2002	
Rozmowy na nowy wiek II	Katarzyna Janowska Piotr Mucharski	Znak (publisher)	2002	
Próbka reprezentatywna	Katarzyna Janowska Piotr Mucharski	Świat Książki	2008	
Po co jest sztuka? Rozmowy z pisarzami cz. 1	Tadeusz Nyczek	MOCAK	2012	
Słowo i sens: Rozmowy Janiny Koźbiel	Janina Koźbiel	Wydawnictwo JanKa	2016	
Pod podszewką. Prawdziwy wizerunek pisarza	Sylwia Stano-Strzałkowska Zofia Karaszewska	Wydawnictwo Marginesy	2018	
Rozmawiamy we wszystkich kierunkach	collective work	Klub Filmowy im. Jolanty Słobodzian	2018	transcript of conversation Jedyny Żyd, który żył jak Pan (participants: Maja Garlińska and Mariusz Koryciński with Paweł Maciejko, Adrian Panek and Olga Tokarczuk)
Rozmowy o przyszłości. W którą stronę zmierza świat?	Katarzyna Janowska Grzegorz Jankowicz Michał Sowiński	Wydawnictwo Mando	2020	
Z niejednej półki. Wywiady	Michał Nogaś	Agora (company)	2020	
