= 2018 Nobel Prize in Literature =

- Olga Tokarczuk
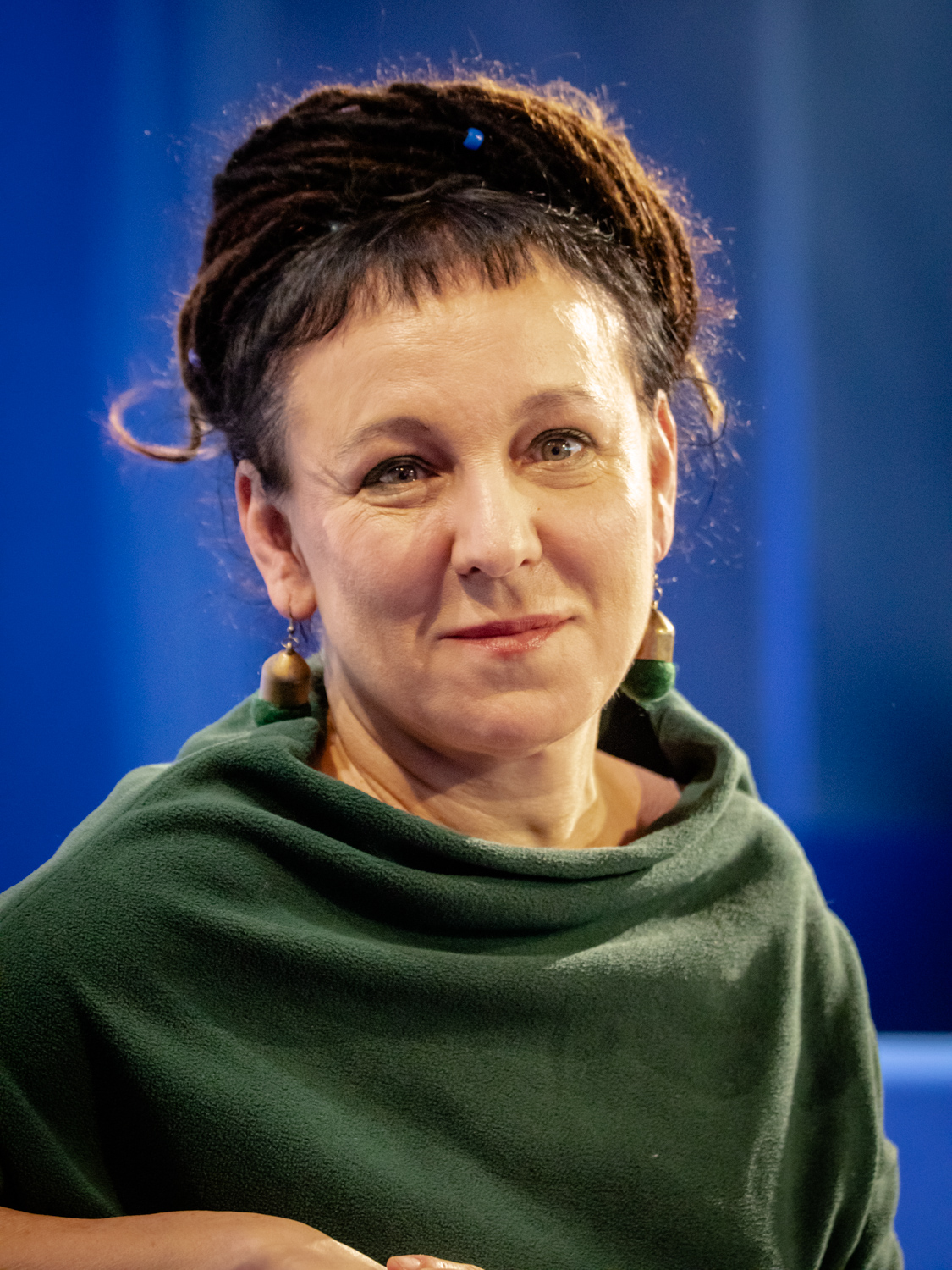
- "for a narrative imagination that with encyclopedic passion represents the crossing of boundaries as a form of life."
- Date: 10 October 2019 (announcement); 10 December 2019 (ceremony)
- Location: Stockholm, Sweden
- Presented by: Swedish Academy
- First award: 1901
- Website: Official website

The 2018 Nobel Prize in Literature was awarded to the Polish writer Olga Tokarczuk (born 1962) "for a narrative imagination that with encyclopedic passion represents the crossing of boundaries as a form of life." The prize was announced the following year by the Swedish Academy on 10 October 2019. Tokarczuk is the fifth Nobel laureate in Literature from Poland writing in Polish, after the poet Wisława Szymborska in 1996, and Czesław Miłosz in 1980.

== Laureate ==
Olga Tokarczuk is inspired by maps and bird's-eye view perspective, which tends to make her microcosmos a mirror of macrocosmos. She constructs her novels in a tension between cultural opposites: nature versus culture, reason versus madness, male versus female, home versus alienation. Her magnum opus is the historical novel Ksiegi Jakubowe ("The Books of Jacob", 2014), portraying the 18th-century mystic and sect leader Jacob Frank. Among her other significant novels include Prawiek i inne czasy ("Primeval and Other Times", 1997), Bieguni ("Flights", 2007), and Prowadź swój pług przez kości umarłych ("Drive Your Plow Over the Bones of the Dead", 2009).

== Candidates ==
According to the site Nicer Odds, who compile odds from various betting sites, favourites to win the prize were the Canadian poet and essayist Anne Carson, French-Guadeloupe author Maryse Condé, Chinese Can Xue, Russian Lyudmila Ulitskaya, Japanese Haruki Murakami and Kenyan Ngugi Wa Thiong’o, closely followed by Olga Tokarczuk, Canadian Margaret Atwood, American Marilynne Robinson and Hungarian Péter Nádas with joint 10/1 odds to win the prize.

== Reactions ==
=== Personal reactions ===
Tokarczuk received the news from the Swedish Academy while driving on a book tour in Germany for the launch the German version of The Books of Jacob. Interviewed by Adam Smith, Chief Scientific Officer of Nobel Media, on 10 October 2019, asking how she reacted to the news of earning the Nobel Prize in Literature, she responded:

"Funny situation because I am, as I told you, on the road. We are driving in Germany, so they called me from Nobel Academy just 15 minutes before and... and then I was so surprised, and I'm still very surprised. And I cannot find out, you know... the right words, how to express, and … which is very new for me, that there are thousands of telephones calls and texts. So I would like to reach a stable place somewhere, a hotel or whatever, and, yeah, just to take my time to... for reaction."

During Smith's phone call, she spoke of the importance of the 2018 Nobel Prize in Literature as a symbol of hope for those worried about the "crisis in democracy" she sees facing central Europe. She also expressed her happiness winning alongside the controversial Austrian author Peter Handke.

=== International reactions ===
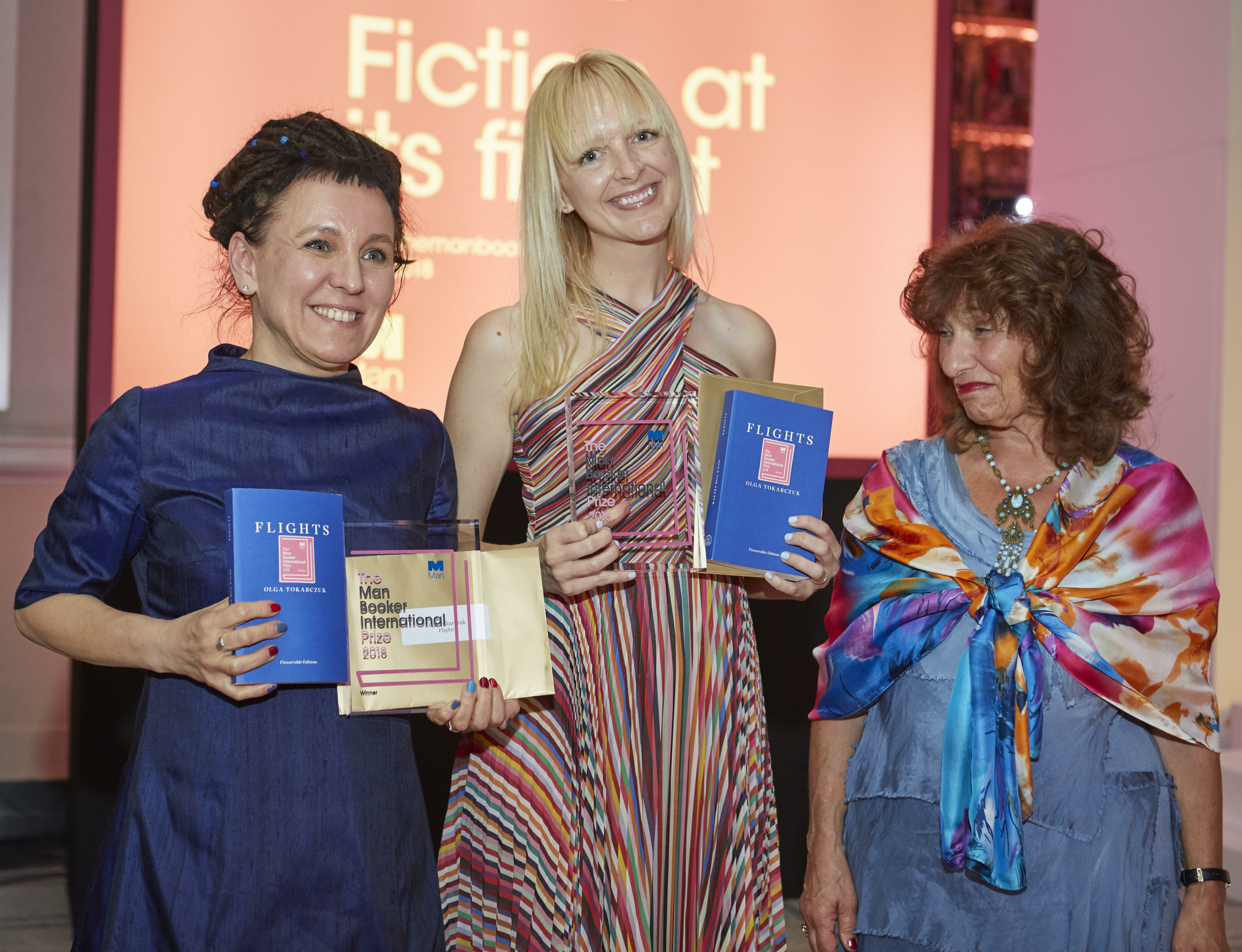
Olga Tokarczuk and her translator Jennifer Croft with Lisa Appignanesi, Chair of the judges for the 2018 Man Booker International Prize.

The choice of Olga Tokarczuk as Nobel Prize Laureate was generally well received. "The Swedish Academy has made many mistakes in recent years", wrote Claire Armitstead, "but in the Polish writer Olga Tokarczuk, it has found not only a fine winner but a culturally important one." Jennifer Croft, who translated Tokarczuk's novel Flights expressed her delight, saying "I'm so thrilled for Olga and so excited for all the new readers who are bound to discover her delicate, powerful, beautifully nuanced novels and short stories thanks to the prize."

In Poland, there was a division after Tokarczuk's win. Tokarczuk outraged rightwing patriots by saying that, contrary to its self-image as a plucky survivor of oppression, Poland itself had committed "horrendous acts" of colonisation at times in its history. Henceforth, she was branded a targowiczanin (traitor) and vilified by right-wing nationalists, among them the national-conservative political party Law and Justice. Krystyna Sliwinska, a Law and Justice councilwoman in Kłodzko, once questioned Tokarczuk's view of Polish history saying: "Who invented the history of Poland that you question? What are those false facts? Ms. Tokarczuk speaks on behalf of all Poles as 'we', but what right does she have to generalize like that? This false message is translated into foreign languages and goes out into the world and the awards follow." Despite the backlash, some politicians welcomed happily the news and celebrated the announcement. Jacek Czaputowicz, Poland's Minister of Foreign Affairs, congratulated her: "We sincerely congratulate Ms. Olga Tokarczuk, an unquestioned ambassador of Polish culture."

== Nobel lecture ==
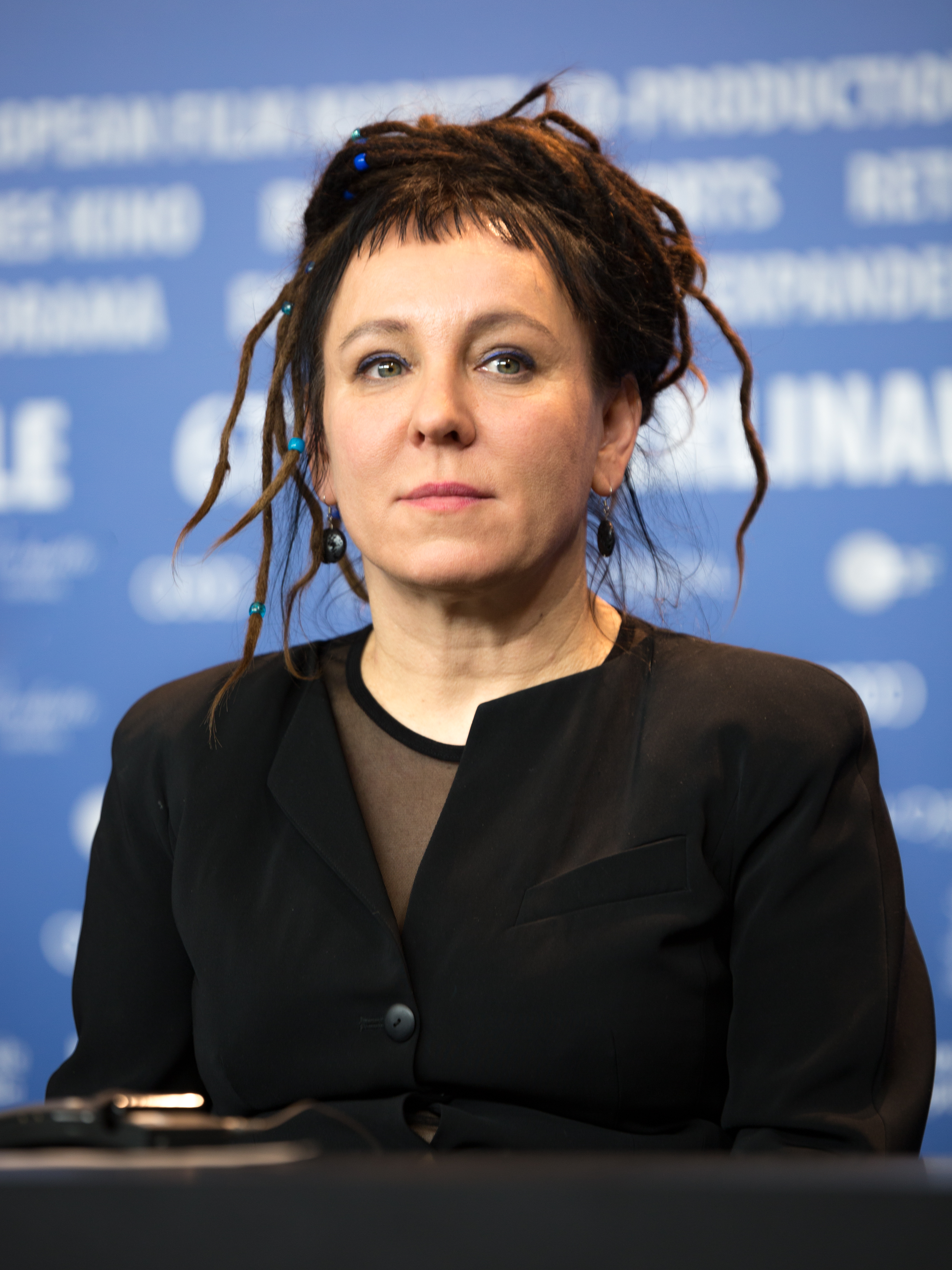
Author Olga Tokarczuk at the presentation of the Polish movie Spoor at the 67th Berlin International Film Festival.

In her Nobel lecture The Tender Narrator, delivered at the Swedish Academy on 7 December 2019, Olga Tokarczuk spoke about her belief in the power of literature in a world of information overload and divisive narratives. According to her, literature is

"built on tenderness toward any being other than ourselves... Literature is one of the few spheres that try to keep us close to the hard facts of the world, because by its very nature it is always psychological, because it focuses on the internal reasoning and motives of the characters, reveals their otherwise inaccessible experience to another person, or simply provokes the reader into a psychological interpretation of their conduct. Only literature is capable of letting us go deep into the life of another being, understand their reasons, share their emotions and experience their fate."

The lecture was named "Emerging Europe's Artistic Achievement 2020" by the organization Emerging Europe.

== Award ceremony ==
=== Prize presentation ===
At the prize presentation on 10 December 2019, Per Wästberg, member of the Swedish Academy, said of Tokarczuk:

"Her fusion of intensive embodiment and ephemeral unreality, intimate observation and mythological obsession, make her one of our time's most original prose writers, with new ways of viewing reality. She is a virtuoso of instant portraiture, capturing characters in the act of escaping daily life. She writes of what no one else does: "the world's excruciating strangeness". "Her prose – drastic, rich in ideas – is in nomadic movement throughout her fifteen or so books. Her villages are centres of the universe, the place a protagonist, its singular destinies woven into a fresco of fable and myth."

=== Banquet speech ===
According to Tokarczuk in her banquet speech, she did not know how the Nobel celebrations are being held annually at Stockholm. Wanting to learn something about the event, she came upon Björn Runge's film The Wife which features the story of an American novelist's wife who questions her life choices and who is later revealed to be behind her husband's Nobel Prize success, being the true author of his acclaimed novels. Tokarczuk immediately clarifies, causing her audience to laugh, that her winning was nothing similar to the film by saying: "No, no, please don't worry – I can solemnly declare that I wrote all my own books myself." Though, she agrees that the laureates' success are greatly rooted in the people who supported, helped and inspired them. "The movie demonstrates a particular phenomenon," she said "which is that prizes treat their laureates as individuals, by ascribing one-hundred-percent of the merit to them. When in fact there are always lots of other people behind their success – those who support, help and inspire." She concluded her speech by stating:

"Today, it is exactly one hundred ten years since the first woman won the Nobel Prize in Literature – Selma Lagerlöf. I bow low to her across time, and to all the other women, all the female creators who boldly exceeded the limiting roles society imposed on them, and had the courage to tell their story to the world loud and clear. I can feel them standing behind me. We really have won the Nobel!"

== 2018 award postponement ==
The awarding of the 2018 Nobel Prize in Literature was postponed to the following year due to a scandal within the Swedish Academy when the husband of member Katarina Frostenson was accused of sexual assault and harassment of at least 18 women, and the couple also accused of leaking the names of prize recipients on at least seven occasions.

In lieu of a 2018 Nobel laureate in literature, the alternative New Academy Prize in Literature, affiliated with neither the Nobel Foundation nor the Swedish Academy, and in no way supported by them, was established as an alternative literary prize. It was awarded to the Guadeloupan-French Maryse Condé.

== Nobel Committee ==
The Swedish Academy's Nobel Committee for the 2018 Nobel Prize in Literature were the following members:

Committee Members
Seat No.	Picture	Name	Elected	Position	Profession
12		Per Wästberg (b. 1933)	1997	committee member	novelist, journalist, poet, essayist
7		Sara Danius (1962–2019)	2013	associate member permanent secretary (resigned)	literary critic, philosopher
4		Anders Olsson (b. 1949)	2008	associate member permanent secretary (pro temporare)	literary critic, literary historian
14		Kristina Lugn (1948–2020)	2006	member	poet, dramatist, writer
8		Jesper Svenbro (b. 1944)	2006	member	poet, classical philologist
