= Katarzyna Kossakowska =

Polish noblewoman and politician in mid 18th-century

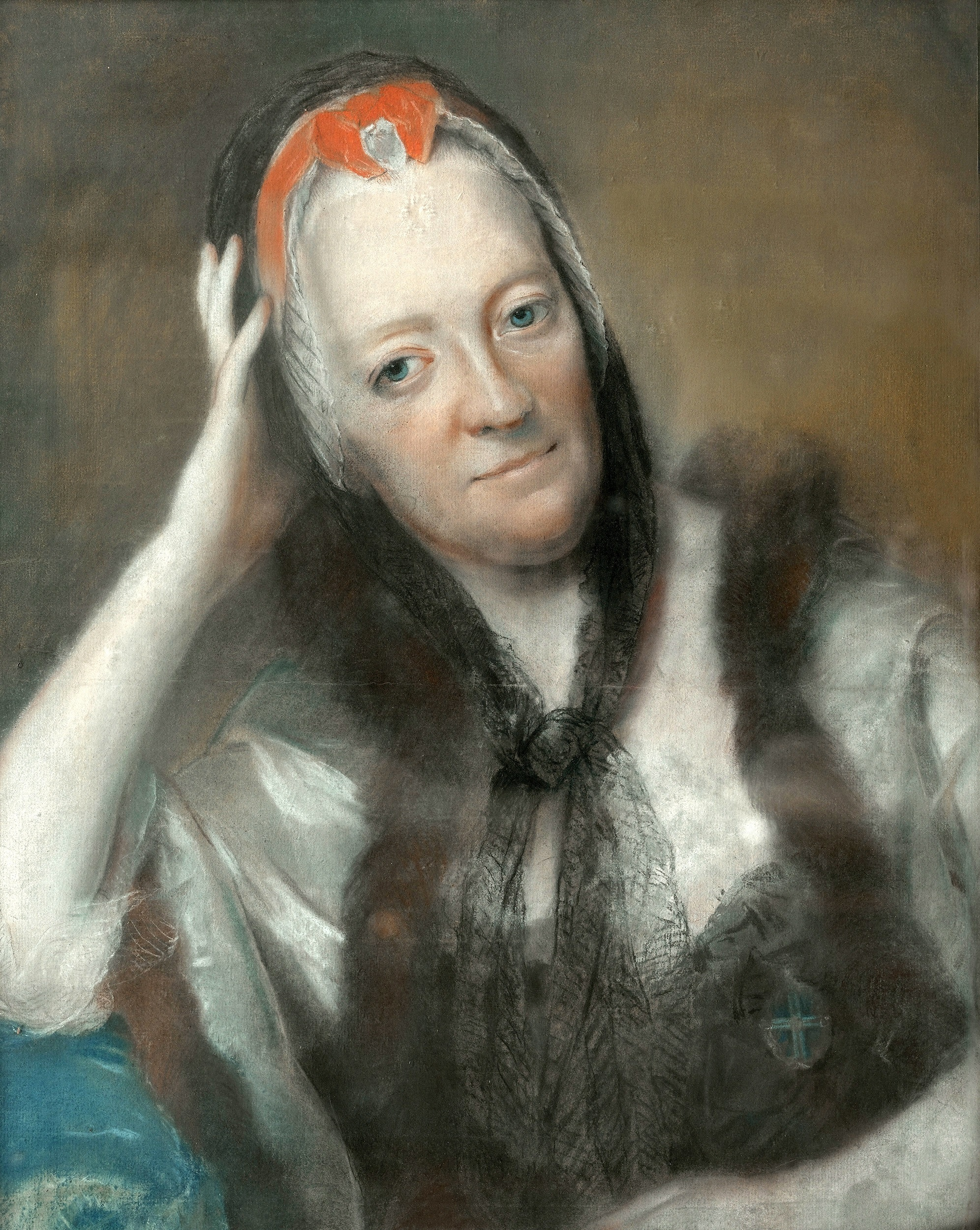
Katarzyna Kossakowska

Katarzyna Kossakowska (died 1803) was a Polish noblewoman and politician. She was an important politician in mid 18th-century Poland, and known for her opposition to King Stanislaw. She was known as a wit.

Her correspondence has been preserved.

She has been portrayed in literature, for example she features in Nobel prize laureate Olga Tokarczuk's The Books of Jacob.
