= Europese Literatuurprijs =

Dutch literature prize

The Europese Literatuurprijs (in English European Literature Prize) is a Dutch literature prize awarded annually since 2011 to the best contemporary European novel that was published in the previous year and translated into Dutch. The author of the winning novel receives €10,000, and the translator €5,000.

The prize is an initiative of the Dutch Foundation for Literature, the academic-cultural center SPUI25, the weekly newspaper De Groene Amsterdammer and the Athenaeum Boekhandel bookstore. It is sponsored by the Lira Fund and various independent bookshops. The book suggestions come from Dutch and Flemish bookshops, though the decision on who ultimately receives the prize is made by a specialist jury.

== Winners ==
Year	Author	Dutch Title	Original Title	Translator(s)	Ref
2011	(France) Marie NDiaye	Drie sterke vrouwen	Trois femmes puissantes	Jeanne Holierhoek	
2012	(United Kingdom) Julian Barnes	Alsof het voorbij is	The Sense of an Ending	Ronald Vlek	
2013	(France) Emmanuel Carrère	Limonov	Limonov	Katrien Vandenberghe, Katelijne de Vuyst	
2014	(France) Jérôme Ferrari	De preek over de val van Rome	Le Sermon sur la chute de Rome	Jan Pieter van der Sterre, Reintje Goos	
2015	(Germany) Jenny Erpenbeck	Een handvol sneeuw	Aller Tage Abend	Elly Schippers	
2016	(Italy) Sandro Veronesi	Zeldzame aarden	Terre rare	Rob Gerritsen	
2017	(United Kingdom) Max Porter	Verdriet is het ding met veren	Grief Is the Thing with Feathers	Saskia van der Lingen	
2018	(Norway) Johan Harstad	Max, Mischa & het Tet-offensief	Max, Mischa & Tetoffensiven	Edith Koenders, Paula Stevens	
2019	(Austria) Arno Geiger	Onder de Drachenwand	Unter der Drachenwand	Wil Hansen	
2020	(Senegal) David Diop	Meer dan een broer	Frère d’âme	Martine Woudt	
2020	(United Kingdom) Ali Smith	Lente	Spring	Karina van Santen, Martine Vosmaer	
2021	(Bosnia and Herzegovina) (Germany) Saša Stanišić	Herkomst	Herkunft	Annemarie Vlaming	
2022	(Spain) Agustín Fernández Mallo	Nocilla trilogie: Nocilla Dream, Nocilla Experience, Nocilla Lab	Proyecto Nocilla: Nocilla Dream, Nocilla Experience, Nocilla Lab	Adri Boon	
2023	(United Kingdom) Claire-Louise Bennett	Kassa 19	Checkout 19	Karina van Santen, Martine Vosmaer	
2024	(Poland) Olga Tokarczuk	Empusion: Een natuurgeneeskundig griezelverhaal	Empuzjon: Horror przyrodoleczniczy	Karol Lesman	
2025	(Spain) Irene Solà	Ik gaf je ogen en je keek in de duisternis	Et vaig donar ulls i vas mirar les tenebres	Adri Boon	
