= Primeval and Other Times =

1996 novel by Olga Tokarczuk

- First edition cover (W.A.B., 1996)
- Author: Olga Tokarczuk
- Original title: Prawiek i inne czasy
- Translator: Antonia Lloyd-Jones
- Language: Polish
- Genre: Postmodern; fantasy; magic realism
- Set in: Prawiek, Poland
- Publisher: Wydawnictwo W.A.B.
- Publication date: 1996
- Publication place: Poland
- English publication date: 2010
- Pages: 268
- ISBN: 978-83-87021-01-6

Primeval and Other Times (Polish: Prawiek i inne czasy) is a fragmentary novel by Olga Tokarczuk, published by Wydawnictwo W.A.B. in 1996.

It is Tokarczuk's third novel and was highly critically successful. It is set in the fictitious village of Prawiek (Primeval) at the very heart of Poland, which is populated by some eccentric, archetypical characters. The novel chronicles the lives of Prawiek's inhabitants over a period of eight decades, beginning in 1914. It has been translated into many languages and established Tokarczuk's international reputation as one of the most important Polish authors of her generation.

== Structure ==
The novel is divided into 60 short vignettes, each focusing one or more fictional characters in different periods of time. According to Tokarczuk, this fragmentary form of storytelling, which she further explored in House of Day, House of Night (1998), is representative of the novel's perception of reality. According to the author, the style of writing arouses this fragmentary perception and conveys that the separate vignettes are part of something greater. Tokarczuk was not fully conscious of the structure's purpose when she wrote the novel, but she strongly defended it against the publisher who suggested changing it.

The novel contains elements of fantasy mixed with magic realism.

== Setting ==
The setting for the novel was inspired by the village of Zagrody, located in the Kielce region, where Tokarczuk spent her childhood holidays. She emphasized, however, that although the fictional village in the book owes its topography to that of Zagrody, it is a fictional locale of her own creation. Tokarczuk rejected the idea that characters in the book could be linked to real inhabitants of Zagrody, and criticised journalists who attempted to do so in the late 1990s. In 2012, inhabitants of Staszów County organized a project to document the locations presented in the novel through photography.

== Reception ==
After its publication, the novel was reviewed by many Polish critics. Ewa Kraskowska wrote that "Olga's time" in literature had come, describing her prose as one of the most captivating phenomena in literature and compared it to the writings of Bolesław Leśmian and Bruno Schulz. Dariusz Nowacki criticized Tokarczuk's prose as being conformist and having a quality more typical of the entertainment industry. Wojciech Browarny considered there to be a feminist element in Tokarczuk's writing, but said she should not be categorised as a feminist writer. Anna Tatarkiewicz praised Tokarczuk for being representative of the prose of young women. The novel was also reviewed by Przemysław Czapliński and Kinga Dunin.

Tokarczuk was awarded the 1996 Paszport Polityki in the literature category and the 1997 Kościelski Award for Primeval. The novel was nominated for the 1997 Nike Award jury prize. While it did not receive the main prize it was, however, awarded their audience award that year. The novel was popular among readers in Poland and abroad, and has been translated into over twenty languages. In 2010, it was published in English as Primeval and Other Times by Twisted Spoon Press, translated by Antonia Lloyd-Jones. The novel was included in the official reading list of Poland's Ministry of National Education.

The book has also been reviewed by Kirsten Lodge for the Slavic and East European Journal.

== Adaptations ==
A stage adaptation of Prawiek i inne czasy, performed by Białostockie Towarzystwo Wierszalin, directed by Sebastian Majewski, premiered in 1997

== Publication history ==
- Prawiek i inne czasy (in Polish). Warsaw: Wydawnictwo W.A.B. 1996. ISBN 978-83-87021-01-6.
- Oer en andere tijden (in Dutch). Translated by Lesman, Karol. Breda: De Geus. 1998. ISBN 978-90-5226-558-2.
- Dieu, le temps, les hommes et les anges (in French). Translated by Glogowski, Christophe. Paris: Éditions Robert Laffont. 1998. ISBN 978-2-221-08615-5.
- Pravěk a jiné časy (in Czech). Translated by Vidlák, Petr. Brno: Host. 1999. ISBN 9788086055831.
- Dio, il tempo, gli uomini e gli angeli (in Italian). Translated by Belletti, Raffaella. Rome: Edizioni e/o. 1999. ISBN 978-88-7641-387-2.
- Ur und andere Zeiten (in German). Translated by Kinsky, Esther. Berlin: Berlin Verlag. 2000. ISBN 9783827003409.
- Praamžiai ir kiti laikai (in Lithuanian). Translated by Jarutis, Vyturys. Vilnius: Strofa. 2000. ISBN 978-9986-751-31-1.
- Un lloc anomenat Antany (in Catalan). Translated by Rubió, Anna; Sławomirski, Jerzy. Barcelona: Edicions Proa. 2001. ISBN 978-84-8256-964-2.
- Pravijek i ostala vremena (in Croatian). Translated by Mioč, Pero. Zagreb: Nakladni zavod Matice hrvatske. 2001. ISBN 978-953-185-049-0.
- Un lugar llamado Antaño (in Spanish). Translated by Rabasco Macías, Ester; Wyrzykowska, Bogumila. Barcelona: Editorial Lumen. 2001. ISBN 978-84-264-1293-5.
- Străveacul și alte vremi (in Romanian). Translated by Zaicik, Olga. Iași: Polirom. 2002. ISBN 9789736810084.
- Правек и другие времена (in Russian). Translated by Изотова, Татьяна. Moscow: Новое литературное обозрение. 2004. ISBN 5867933067.
- Правік та інші часи (in Ukrainian). Translated by Дмитрук, Віктор. Lviv: Кальварія. 2004. ISBN 9666631369.
- Pravek in drugi časi (in Slovenian). Translated by Šuler-Galos, Jasmina. Maribor: Litera. 2005. ISBN 961-6422-87-1.
- 太古和其他的時間 (in Chinese). Translated by 易麗君&袁漢鎔. Taipei: 大塊文化. 2006. ISBN 978-986-797-599-7.
- Gammeltida och andra tider (in Swedish). Translated by Ilke, Lennart. Sweden: Ariel förlag. 2006. ISBN 978-91-975540-0-8.
- Alku ja muut ajat (in Finnish). Translated by Kärkkäinen, Tapani. Helsinki: Otava. 2007. ISBN 978-951-1-21067-2.
- Правек и другите времиња (in Macedonian). Translated by Tanushevska, Lidija. Skopje: Македонска реч. 2007. ISBN 978-9989-163-46-3.
- Правек и други времена (in Bulgarian). Translated by Кръстев, Георги. Sofia: Алтера. 2008. ISBN 978-954-9757-07-1.
- Primeval and Other Times. Translated by Lloyd-Jones, Antonia. Prague: Twisted Spoon Press. 2010. ISBN 978-80-86264-35-6.
- Őskor és más idők (in Hungarian). Translated by Gábor, Körner. Budapest: L'Harmattan Kiadó. 2011. ISBN 978-963-236-333-2.
- Algus ja teised ajad (in Estonian). Translated by Lindepuu, Hendrik. Tartu: Hendrik Lindepuu Kirjastus. 2012. ISBN 9789949933334.
- Pamtivek i druga doba (in Serbian). Translated by Markić, Milica. Belgrade: Paideia. 2013. ISBN 978-86-7448-571-2.
- Pravek a iné časy (in Slovak). Translated by Chmel, Karol. Bratislava: Premedia. 2015. ISBN 978-80-8159-329-1.
- Το Αρχέγονο και άλλοι καιροί (in Greek). Translated by Ιωαννίδου, Αλεξάνδρα Δ. Athens: Εκδόσεις Καστανιώτη. 2017. ISBN 978-960-03-6165-0.
- 태고의 시간들 (in Korean). Translated by 최성은. Seoul: 은행나무. 2019. ISBN 979-11-88810-89-5.
- Outrora e Outros Tempos (in Portuguese). Translated by Fernandes Swiatkiewicz, Teresa. Amadora: Cavalo de Ferro. 2020. ISBN 9789895640690.
- หมู่บ้านบรรพกาลและห้วงกาลอื่นๆ (in Thai). Translated by ฐาปณี ทับหนองฮี. Bangkok: บทจร. 2025. ISBN 9786168250372.
