= The Empusium =

2022 novel by Olga Tokarczuk

- First edition cover
- Author: Olga Tokarczuk
- Audio read by: Kinga Preis
- Original title: Empuzjon. Horror przyrodoleczniczy
- Translator: Antonia Lloyd-Jones
- Language: Polish
- Publisher: Wydawnictwo Literackie
- Publication date: 1 June 2022
- Publication place: Kraków
- English publication date: 24 September 2024 (US); 26 September 2024 (UK)
- Media type: Print (hardback), e-book, audiobook
- Pages: 400 pp.
- ISBN: 978-83-08-07577-7
- OCLC: 1331408258
- Dewey Decimal: 891.8/538
- LC Class: PG7179.O37 E67 2022

The Empusium: A Health Resort Horror Story (Polish: Empuzjon. Horror przyrodoleczniczy) is a 2022 historical novel by Olga Tokarczuk. Originally published in Polish by Wydawnictwo Literackie, it was later translated to English by Antonia Lloyd-Jones and published in 2024 by Riverhead Books (US) and Fitzcarraldo Editions (UK). It was Tokarczuk's first new novel in eight years, and her first since winning the Nobel Prize in Literature.

== Plot ==
The story takes place in 1913 at Görbersdorf, a sanatorium in Lower Silesia. This medical complex, created by Dr. Hermann Brehmer in a valley in the Sudetes, is one of the first to treat tuberculosis. The young Mieczysław Wojnicz, a hydraulic engineering student from Lwów, arrives at the sanatorium on a cold September night to treat his lungs with the purity of the mountain air and a healthy lifestyle. During his treatment, he takes up a room in a guesthouse for gentlemen run by a man named Wilhelm Opitz and meets other patients including the Catholic professor Longin Lukas, the Romanian-born socialist August August, the German student of Fine Arts Thilo von Hahn and even a secret police adviser. In this place cut off from the world and its occupations, these men discuss religion, culture, politics and especially their favorite subject, the nature of women. Listening to them in the shadows, the mysterious empousae observe them and lie in wait.

== Background ==
The Empusium shares several literary qualities with Thomas Mann's 1924 novel The Magic Mountain, as well as reprising several exact plot elements: a sanatorium for the treatment of tuberculosis; a time setting of 1913 which precedes World War I; and a protagonist who is a young engineer. Olga Tokarczuk acknowledges that The Empusium is "a conscious, carefully thought-out reference" to The Magic Mountain. The Wall Street Journal assessed Tokarczuk's novel as an "homage and part rejoinder" to Mann's original work and one which glides from "playful pastiche to feminist polemic". The Magic Mountain centers on the young Hans Castorp and his sojourn at the tuberculosis sanatorium Berghof in Davos in the Swiss Alps, which eventually morphs into a seven-year residence for Castorp. In a 2022 interview, Tokarczuk mentioned that she rereads Mann's novel every few years: "It's interesting to see a book change with time, and that is one that must be read differently with age." The Atlantic likewise classified The Empusium as a bildungsroman, as it charts the growth and development of the young Mieczysław Wojnicz.

Contrasting its qualities from that of Mann's novel, the New York Journal of Books wrote that The Empusium "falls into the ambiguous category of literary suspense and is woven through with magical realism, disconcerting point-of-view switches involving unexplained "we" observers, and verb-tense changes from past to present". Dustin Illingworth in The Washington Post similarly interrogated the novel's genre as suggested in its subtitle: "The novel never fully commits to horror. With its sequential discoveries and prolonged tension, it hews more closely to the contours of a psychological thriller." Wojnicz's passages are narrated in past-tense third-person, whereas the mysterious "we" narration is first-person plural, and seemingly comes from the ghostly entities.

Olga Tokarczuk defines The Empusium as a "horror story of the patriarchate" that deals with themes such as a black-and-white gender binary view of the world and misogyny that are historically embedded in culture. All of the misogynistic views expressed in the novel paraphrase actual quotes by historical persons and authors such as Augustine of Hippo, William S. Burroughs, Bernard of Cluny, Joseph Conrad, Charles Darwin, Henry Fielding, Sigmund Freud, Hesiod, Jack Kerouac, D. H. Lawrence, William Somerset Maugham, John Milton, Friedrich Nietzsche, Ovid, Plato, Ezra Pound, Jean Racine, Jean-Paul Sartre, Arthur Schopenhauer, William Shakespeare, Simonides of Ceos, August Strindberg, Jonathan Swift, Algernon Charles Swinburne, Tertullian, Thomas Aquinas, and others.

The novel's title (Empuzjon in Polish) is a neologism by Tokarczuk derived from the name for a shapeshifting female demon called Empusa who was thought, in Greek mythology, to prey upon men. The spectre was understood as being commanded and sent by the night goddess Hecate. Empusa is mentioned in a scene from Aristophanes's play The Frogs, which one of Tokarczuk's characters recites for the others. The term "empusium" is not fully explained within the book and only explored more deeply in its final pages.

The book's epigraph reproduces a passage from Fernando Pessoa's The Book of Disquiet:

Such is the law by which things that can't be explained must be forgotten. The visible world goes on as usual in the broad daylight. Otherness watches us from the shadows.

== Publication ==
The book, originally titled Empuzjon. Horror przyrodoleczniczy, was first published on 1 June 2022, by the Kraków publishing house Wydawnictwo Literackie. Antonia Lloyd-Jones completed the English translation, which was titled The Empusium: A Health Resort Horror Story. It was first published by Riverhead Books in the U.S. on 24 September 2024, and two days later by Fitzcarraldo Editions in the UK.

== Reception ==
Bekah Waalkes of The Atlantic wrote, "The Empusium is a masterful novel, with a breadth of possible readings." In his review for The Wall Street Journal, Sam Sacks called it an "absorbing if often mystifying reading, but what stands out most is the philosophical conflict it stages between rationality and folk belief." Chris Power in The Guardian said that Tokarczuk's "riff on The Magic Mountain takes on a darkly surreal life of its own". Power noted "a cursory feel to the way scenes begin and end, and details are fed to the reader in an odd, out-of-order way", which is "giving the novel a haphazard quality." "Having The Empusium embody, on a structural level, this idea of reality as 'blurred, out of focus, flickering, now like this, now like that' is a brave and interesting move."

== Awards ==
In September 2024, the work won the Europese Literatuurprijs.

Year	Award	Category	Result	Ref.
2022	Janusz A. Zajdel Award	Powieść	Nominated	
2024	Europese Literatuurprijs	—	Won	
2024	Foyles Book of the Year	—	Shortlisted	
2025	EBRD Literature Prize	—	Pending	

== Stage adaptation ==
On 12 May 2023, a stage adaptation of the novel directed by Robert Talarczyk premiered at the Silesian Theatre in Katowice.
