= Fragmentary novel =

Type of literary work

A fragmentary novel is a novel made of fragments, vignettes, segments, documents or chapters that can be read in isolation and/or as part of the greater whole of the book. These novels typically lack a traditional plot or set of characters and often are the product of a cultural crisis. The oldest fragmentary novels are part of the (proto)-picaresque novel tradition. Some of these fragmented novels are also categorized as short story collections or epistolary novels. Some fragmentary novels are (posthumously) published unfinished novels or are partially lost novels.

== Examples in chronological order ==
=== Pre-2000 ===
- Petronius – Satyricon (Late 1st century AD) (incomplete)
- Apuleius – The Golden Ass (Late second century AD)
- François Rabelais – The Life of Gargantua and of Pantagruel (1532-1564)
- Laurence Sterne – Tristram Shandy (1759)
- Friedrich Schiller – The Ghost-Seer (1789)
- Novalis – Heinrich von Ofterdingen (1802)
- Karl Marx – Skorpion und Felix, Humoristischer Roman (Scorpion and Felix) (1837)
- Henri Murger – Scenes of Bohemian Life (1849)
- William Makepeace Thackeray – A Shabby Genteel Story (1857) (unfinished)
- Jane Austen – The Watsons (1871) (unfinished in 1805)
- Gustave Flaubert – Bouvard et Pécuchet (1881)
- Sherwood Anderson – Winesburg, Ohio (1919)
- Ernest Hemingway – In Our Time (1925)
- John Dos Passos – Manhattan Transfer (1925)
- Franz Kafka – Amerika (1927) (unfinished)
- Giorgio de Chirico – Hebdomeros (Hebdomeros, the Metaphysician) (1929)
- Evelyn Waugh – Vile Bodies (1930)
- Flann O'Brien – At Swim-Two-Birds (1939)
- Thomas Wolfe – The Hills Beyond (1941)
- William Faulkner – Go Down, Moses (1942)
- Robert Musil – The Man Without Qualities (1943)
- Raymond Queneau – Exercises in Style (1947)
- Ray Bradbury – The Martian Chronicles (1950)
- A.E. van Vogt – The Voyage of the Space Beagle (1950)
- William S. Burroughs – Naked Lunch (1959)
- Vladimir Nabokov – Pale Fire (1962)
- Julio Cortázar – Hopscotch (1963)
- Mikhail Bulgakov – The Master and Margarita (1967) (unfinished in 1940)
- Jerzy Kosiński – Steps (1968)
- Tomás Rivera – …y no se lo tragó la tierra (…And the Earth Did Not Devour Him) (1971)
- Italo Calvino – Invisible Cities (1972)
- Renata Adler – Speedboat (1976)
- Georges Perec – Life a User's Manual (1978)
- Sandra Cisneros – The House on Mango Street (1983)
- Milorad Pavić – Dictionary of the Khazars (1984)
- Truman Capote – Answered Prayers (1986)
- David Markson – Wittgenstein's Mistress (1988)
- W. G. Sebald – Vertigo (1990)
- A. S. Byatt – Possession (1990)
- Tim O'Brien – The Things They Carried (1990)
- Michael Ondaatje – The English Patient (1992)
- Mark Z. Danielewski – House of Leaves (2000)

=== 2000—present ===
- Ian McEwan – Atonement (2001)
- David Mitchell – Cloud Atlas (2004)
- Roberto Bolaño – 2666 (2004)
- Olga Tokarczuk – Flights (2007)
- David Foster Wallace – The Pale King (2011) (unfinished in 2008)
- Zadie Smith – NW (2012)
- Michael Chabon – Moonglow (2016)
- Jenny Offill – Weather (2020)
- Dimitris Lyacos – Until the Victim Becomes our Own (2025)
