= Brückepreis =

The Brückepreis (Bridge prize; Upper Sorbian: Móst-płaćizna) is an international prize given annually to a person who contributed by a life's work to better understanding between peoples (Völkerverständigung, Cultural diplomacy) in Europe. It is awarded annually, beginning in 1993, by the town of Görlitz/Zgorzelec. The Europastadt (Town of Europe) lies in both Germany and Poland, connected by a bridge across the Neisse river, and not far from the Czech Republic. The bridge appears in the prize name also for building bridges among peoples and states, as Norbert Lammert, the president of the Bundestag, expressed in his laudatio for Arvo Pärt in 2007. The official name is Internationaler Brückepreis der Europastadt Görlitz/Zgorzelec. The prize money is €2,500. The prize is managed by an association, Gesellschaft zur Verleihung des Internationalen Brückepreises der Europastadt Görlitz/Zgorzelec.

The Euro-Mediterranean Human Rights Monitor (Euro-Med) & Hamas called on the Brückepreis Prize to withdraw the 2020 prize awarded to former Israeli official Tzipi Livni who’s accused of alleged war crimes and crimes against humanity committed in the blockaded Gaza Strip during Operation Case Lead 2008/9 when she was Israel’s Foreign Minister.

== Recipients ==
- 1993 Marion Gräfin Dönhoff, journalist, editor of the weekly Die Zeit
- 1995 Adam Michnik, chef editor of the daily Gazeta Wyborcza
- 1998 Jiří Gruša, president of P.E.N. International, former Czech ambassador, and writer
- 1999 Freya von Moltke, founder of the Internationale Jugendbegegnungsstätte Kreisau "Stiftung Kreisau für europäische Verständigung" (Kreisau foundation for cultural diplomacy)
- 2000 Arno Lustiger, publisher
- 2001 Miloslav Vlk, Cardinal, Archbishop of Prague
- 2002 Władysław Bartoszewski, former Polish Foreign minister
- 2003 Kurt Biedenkopf, former prime minister
- 2004 Valdas Adamkus, President of Lituania
- 2005 Giora Feidman, musician engaged in reconciliation between cultures
- 2006 Günter Grass, writer (not accepted)
- 2007 Arvo Pärt, composer
- 2008 Fritz Stern, German-born US-American historian
- 2009 Norman Davies, British historian
- 2010 Tadeusz Mazowiecki, former Polish Prime Minister
- 2011 Gesine Schwan, former president of the Viadrina European University
- 2012 Vitali Klitschko, boxer and Ukrainian politician
- 2013 Steffen Möller, actor and cabarettist
- 2014 Jean-Claude Juncker, politician in Luxembourg and Europe
- 2015 Olga Tokarczuk, Polish writer
- 2016 Timothy Garton Ash, British historian and writer
- 2017 Alfons Nossol, former bishop of Opole
- 2018 Daniel Libeskind, architect
- 2019 Bente Kahan, musician and actor
- 2020 Tzipi Livni, Israeli politician, former Israeli Foreign Minister
- 2022 Herta Müller, German novelist, poet and essayist
- 2023 Dieter Bingen, political scientist
- 2024 Mirjana Spoljaric Egger, Swiss-Croatian diplomat
- 2025 Joachim Gauck, former President of Germany
