= E.E. (novel) =

1995 psychological novel by Olga Tokarczuk

- Author: Olga Tokarczuk
- Language: Polish
- Publisher: PIW
- Publication date: 1995
- Publication place: Poland
- Pages: 206 pages
- ISBN: 8306024443
- OCLC: 751189316

E.E. is a 1995 psychological novel by the Polish author Olga Tokarczuk. Set in Wrocław at the turn of the 20th century, it tells the story of a teenaged Erna Eltzer, who suddenly gains paranormal skills and is used as a medium. The novel draws from Carl Jung's doctoral dissertation On the Psychology and Pathology of So-Called Occult Phenomena.

== Plot ==
E.E. is a psychological novel with an omniscient narrator, set in Wrocław at the beginning of the 20th century. The main character is Erna Eltzer, the eponymous E.E., who belongs to the Polish-German bourgeoisie. The novel tells the story of Erna undergoing puberty, when she suddenly gains paranormal skills. Thanks to her new abilities, she begins to be perceived as someone special compared to her siblings, which helps her gain the interest of her mother, who is everything to her. Erna's mother, an unfulfilled actress who does not enjoy being a housewife, uses her daughter as a medium to attract attention in her milieu. With the interest generated by her psychic abilities, Erna loses her agency and turns into a medical case under the alias "E.E.", an object of doctors' examinations. Her only means of escaping the situation are walks in the park and contact with nature.

== Background ==
The novel was based on elements of Carl Jung's doctoral dissertation entitled On the Psychology and Pathology of So-Called Occult Phenomena. Characterization of the heroine of E.E. alludes to a patient called "S.W.", while the plot of the novel draws elements of the dissertation. Jung's scientific distance to the object of his study is noticeable in the notes of one of the novel's characters, the young psychoanalyst Artur Schatzmann, who is a parody of Jung himself.

== Reception ==
According to Rafał Grupiński and Izolda Kiec, the novel is a parable of human fate which speaks of unfulfillment and dreams. In the opinion of Brigitta Helbig-Mischewski, the novel describes a "woman's tragedy of lacking agency". Katarzyna Kantner notes that Tokarczuk skillfully uses the convention of the psychological novel, transforming it into her own spin on the genre. She also draws attention to the fact that E.E. is the first novel by the author in which she explores the relationship between the body and the mind.

The book has been translated into Danish, Norwegian, Macedonian, Ukrainian and Estonian.

== Adaptations ==
In 1998, the Polish public service broadcaster Telewizja Polska produced a TV play adaptation under the same title, directed by Maria Zmarz-Koczanowicz. The role of Erna Eltzner was played by Agata Buzek. Tokarczuk co-wrote the screenplay.
