= Olga Tokarczuk =

Polish writer and activist (born 1962)

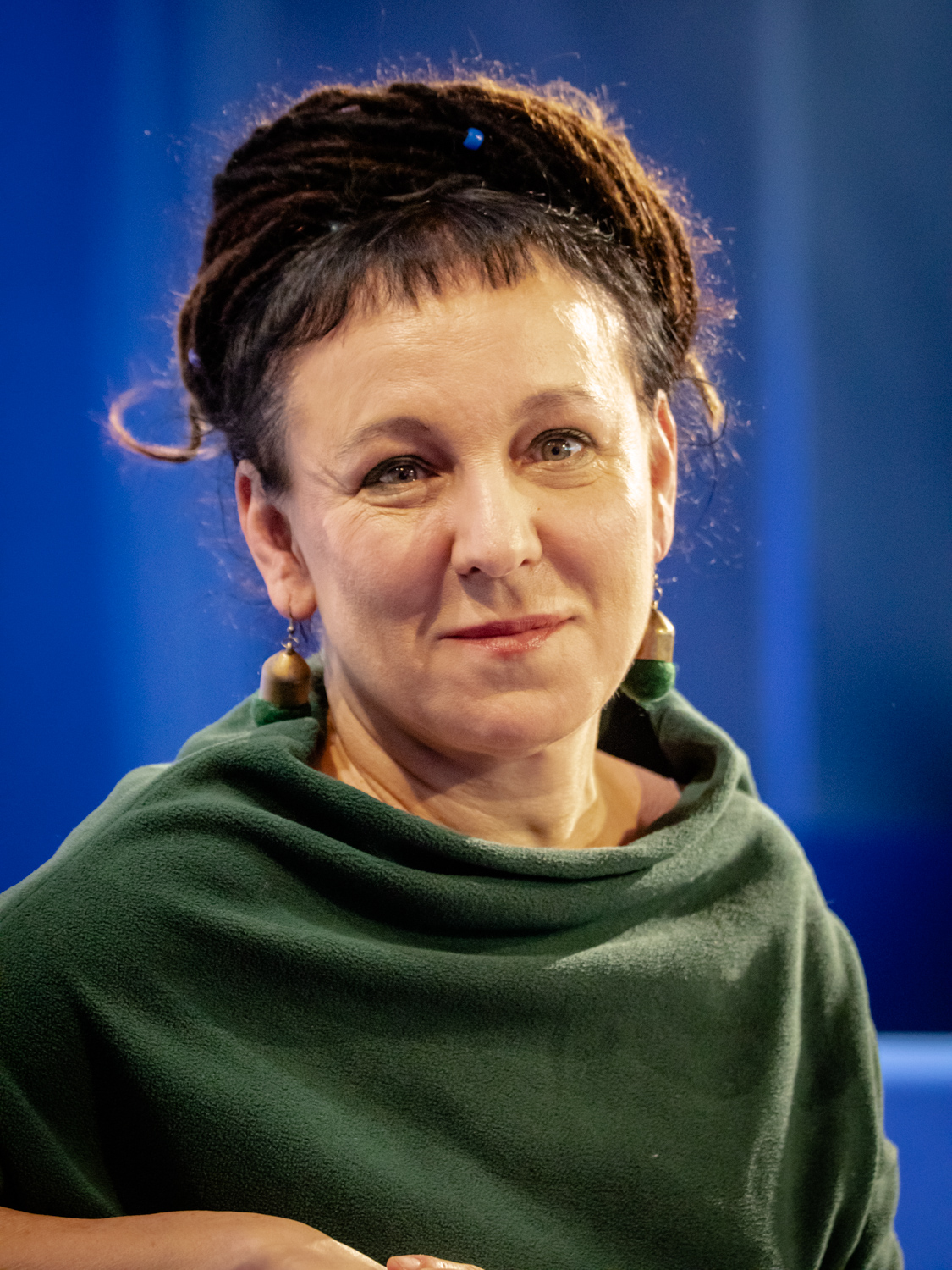
- Tokarczuk in 2019
- Born: Olga Nawoja Tokarczuk; 29 January 1962 (age 64); Sulechów, Poland
- Education: University of Warsaw (MA)
- Occupations: Writer; psychologist; screenwriter
- Writing career
- Language: Polish
- Years active: 1989–present
- Period: Contemporary
- Genres: Novel; travelogue; essay; poetry
- Notable works: Primeval and Other Times (1996); Flights (2007); Drive Your Plow Over the Bones of the Dead (2009); The Books of Jacob (2014)
- Notable awards: Nike Award (2008, 2015); Vilenica Prize (2013); Brückepreis (2015); The Man Booker International Prize (2018); Jan Michalski Prize (2018); Nobel Prize in Literature (2018); Prix Laure Bataillon (2019)
- Movement: Magic realism

Olga Nawoja Tokarczuk (Polish: [tɔˈkart͡ʂuk]; born 29 January 1962) is a Polish writer, activist, and public intellectual.

Tokarczuk is one of the most critically acclaimed and successful Polish authors of her generation. In 2019, she was awarded the 2018 Nobel Prize in Literature for "a narrative imagination that with encyclopedic passion represents the crossing of boundaries as a form of life".

For her novel Flights, Tokarczuk was awarded the 2018 Man Booker International Prize. Her works include Primeval and Other Times, Drive Your Plow Over the Bones of the Dead, and The Books of Jacob.

Tokarczuk is noted for the mythical tone of her writing. A clinical psychologist from the University of Warsaw, she has published a collection of poems, several novels, and books of shorter prose works.

For Flights and The Books of Jacob, she won the Nike Award, Poland's top literary prize, among other accolades; she won the Nike audience award five times. In 2015, she received the German-Polish Bridge Prize for her contribution to mutual understanding between European nations.

Her works have been translated into almost 40 languages, making her one of the most translated contemporary Polish writers. The Books of Jacob, regarded as her magnum opus, was released in the UK in November 2021 after seven years of translation work, followed by release in the US in February 2022. In March, it was shortlisted for the 2022 International Booker Prize.

== Biography ==
=== Early life, and education ===
Olga Tokarczuk was born in Sulechów near Zielona Góra, in western Poland. She is the daughter of two teachers, Wanda Słabowska and Józef Tokarczuk, and has a sister. Her parents were resettled from former Polish eastern regions after World War II; one of her grandmothers was of Ukrainian origin. The family lived in the countryside in Klenica, 11 miles from Zielona Góra, where her parents taught at the People's University and her father ran a school library where she found her love of literature. Her father was a member of the Polish United Workers' Party. As a child, Tokarczuk liked Henryk Sienkiewicz's novel In Desert and Wilderness and fairy tales, among others. Her family later moved to Kietrz in Opolian Silesia, where she graduated from the C.K. Norwid high school. In 1979, she debuted with two short stories published in the youth scouting magazine Na Przełaj (No. 39, under the pseudonym Natasza Borodin).

Tokarczuk went on to study clinical psychology at the University of Warsaw in 1980, and during her studies, she volunteered in an asylum for adolescents with behavioral problems. After graduation in 1985, she moved to Wrocław and later Wałbrzych, where she worked as a psychotherapist in 1986–89 and teachers' trainer in 1989–96. In the meantime, she published poems and reviews in the press and a book of poetry in 1989. Her works were awarded at Walbrzych Literary Paths (1988, 1990). Tokarczuk quit to concentrate on literature. She said she felt "more neurotic than my clients". She did odd jobs in London for a while, improving her English, and had literary scholarships in the United States (1996) and in Berlin (2001/02).

=== Inspiration and family ===
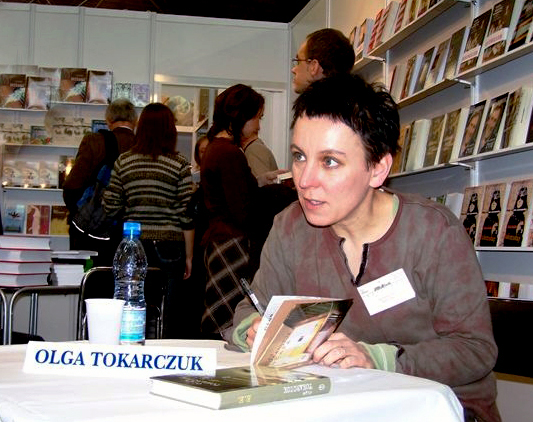
Tokarczuk in Kraków, Poland (2005)

Tokarczuk considers herself a disciple of Carl Jung and cites his psychology as an inspiration for her writing.

Since 1998, she has lived between Krajanów and Wrocław, in Lower Silesia. Her home in Krajanów near Nowa Ruda is in the Sudetes mountains at the multicultural Polish-Czech borderland. The locale has influenced her literary work; the novel House of Day, House of Night touches on life in the region, and the action of Drive Your Plow Over the Bones of the Dead takes place in the picturesque Kłodzko Valley. In 1998, together with her first husband, Tokarczuk founded the Ruta publishing house, which operated until 2004. She was an organizer of the International Short Story Festival, which was inaugurated in Wrocław in 2004. As a guest lecturer, she conducted prose workshops at universities in Kraków and Opole. Tokarczuk joined the editorial team of Krytyka Polityczna (Eng. ed. Political Critique), a magazine as well as a large pan-regional network of institutions and activists, and currently serves on the board of trustees of its academic and research unit, the Institute for Advance Study in Warsaw.

In 2009, Tokarczuk received a literary scholarship from the Netherlands Academy of Arts and Sciences, and during her stay at the NIAS campus in Wassenaar, she wrote Drive Your Plow Over the Bones of the Dead, which was published that year.

Roman Fingas, a fellow psychologist, was Tokarczuk's first husband. They married when she was 23 and later divorced; their son Zbigniew was born in 1986. Grzegorz Zygadło is her second husband. She is a vegetarian.

=== Literary career ===
==== Early works ====
Tokarczuk's first book, the poetry collection Miasta w lustrach (Cities in Mirrors), was published in 1989. Her debut novel, Podróż ludzi księgi (The Journey of the Book-People), was published in 1993. A parable on two lovers' quest for the "secret of the Book"—a metaphor for the meaning of life—it is set in the 17th century and portrays an expedition to a monastery in the Pyrenees on the trail of a book that reveals the mystery of life, ending with an ironic twist. It was well received by critics and won the Polish Publisher's Prize for best debut.

Tokarczuk's next novel, E.E. (1995), plays with the conventions of the modernist psychological novel, and takes its title from the initials of its protagonist, the adolescent Erna Eltzner, who develops psychic abilities. Growing up in a wealthy German-Polish family in the 1920s in Wrocław, at that time a German city named Breslau, she allegedly becomes a medium, a fact her mother begins to take advantage of by organizing spiritual sessions. Tokarczuk introduces the characters of scientists, the psychiatrist-patient relationship, and despite elements of spiritualism, occultism, and gnosticism, she represents psychological realism and cognitive scepticism. Katarzyna Kantner, a literary scholar who defended her PhD thesis on Tokarczuk's work, points to Jung's doctoral dissertation On the Psychology and Pathology of So-Called Occult Phenomena as an inspiration.

==== Primeval and Other Times ====
Tokarczuk's third novel, Primeval and Other Times (Prawiek i inne czasy, Eng. 2010), was published in 1996 and was highly successful. It is set in the fictitious village of Primeval at the very heart of Poland, which is populated by eccentric, archetypical characters. The village, a microcosm of Europe, is guarded by four archangels, from whose perspective the book chronicles its inhabitants' lives over eight decades, beginning in the year World War I broke out. The book presents the creation of a myth emerging before the reader's eyes. "This is Primeval: an enclosed snow globe, a world in itself, which it may or may not be possible to ever leave. [...] And yet, as much as the town of Primeval is devastated, over and over, by history, there is also a counter dream, full of creaturely magic and wonder." Translated into many languages, with an English version by Antonia Lloyd-Jones, Primeval and Other Times established Tokarczuk's reputation as one of the most important representatives of Polish literature in her generation.

After Primeval and Other Times, her work began drifting away from the novel genre toward shorter prose texts and essays. Tokarczuk's next book, Szafa (The Wardrobe, 1997) was a collection of three novella-type stories.

==== House of Day, House of Night and other works ====
House of Day, House of Night (Dom dzienny, dom nocny, 1998, Eng. 2003) is what Tokarczuk calls a "constellation novel", a patchwork of loosely connected, disparate stories, sketches, and essays about life past and present in her adopted home in Krajanów, which allow various interpretations and enable communication at a deeper, psychological level. Her goal is to make those images, fragments of narrative and motif, merge only on entering the reader's consciousness. While some, at least those unfamiliar with Central European history, have called it Tokarczuk's most "difficult" book, it was her first to be published in English and was shortlisted for the International Dublin Literary Award in 2004.

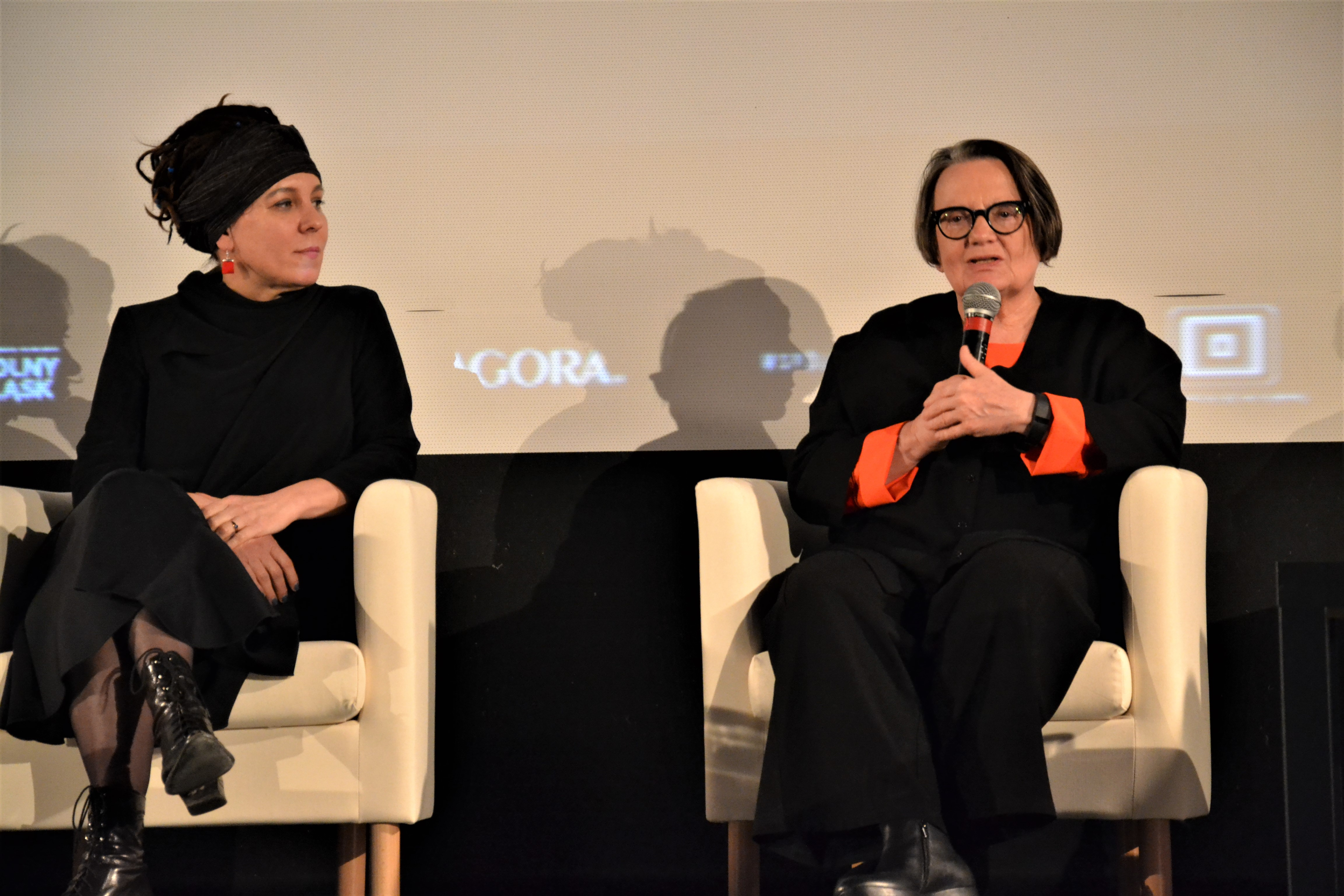
Tokarczuk (left) and director Agnieszka Holland in 2017

House of Day, House of Night was followed by a collection of short stories, Gra na wielu bębenkach (Playing on Many Drums, 2001) and a book-length nonfiction essay, Lalka i perła (The Doll and the Pearl, 2000), about Bolesław Prus's classic novel The Doll. She also published a volume with three modern Christmas tales, together with Jerzy Pilch and Andrzej Stasiuk (Opowieści wigilijne, 2000). Ostatnie historie (The Last Stories, 2004) is an exploration of death from the perspectives of three generations, while the novel Anna In w grobowcach świata (Anna In in the Tombs of the World, 2006) was a contribution to the Canongate Myth Series by Polish publisher Znak.

==== Flights ====
Tokarczuk's novel Flights (Bieguni, 2007, Eng. 2018) returns to the patchwork approach of essay and fiction, the major theme of which is modern-day nomads. The book explores how a person moves through time and space as well as the psychology of traveling. Flights received both the jury and the readers' prize of the 2008 Nike Awards, and then the 2018 Man Booker International Prize (translation by Jennifer Croft). The novel landed on the short list for the U.S. National Book Award in the "Translated Literature" category; a panel of judges wrote:

Through [...] brilliantly imagined characters and stories, interwoven with haunting, playful, and revelatory meditations, Flights explores what it means to be a traveler, a wanderer, a body in motion not only through space but through time. Where are you from? Where are you coming in from? Where are you going? we call to the traveler. Enchanting, unsettling, and wholly original, Flights is a master storyteller’s answer.

==== Drive Your Plow Over the Bones of The Dead ====
In 2009, Tokarczuk published the existential, noir thriller novel Drive Your Plow Over the Bones of the Dead (Prowadź swój pług przez kości umarłych, Eng. 2019), an acid social satire that is not a conventional crime story. The main character and narrator is Janina Duszejko, a woman in her 60s living in a rural area in the Polish Kłodzko Valley, eccentric in perception of others through astrology and fond of the poetry of William Blake, from whose work the book's title is taken. She decides to investigate the murders of members of the local hunting club and initially explains them as having been caused by wild animals taking revenge on hunters. The novel was a bestseller in Poland. It was the basis of the crime film Spoor (2017), directed by Agnieszka Holland, which won the Alfred Bauer Prize (Silver Bear) at the 67th Berlin International Film Festival. The English translation by Antonia Lloyd-Jones earned Tokarczuk a second nomination for the Man Booker International Prize. In 2022, a stage version of the novel was produced by the British theatre company Complicité.

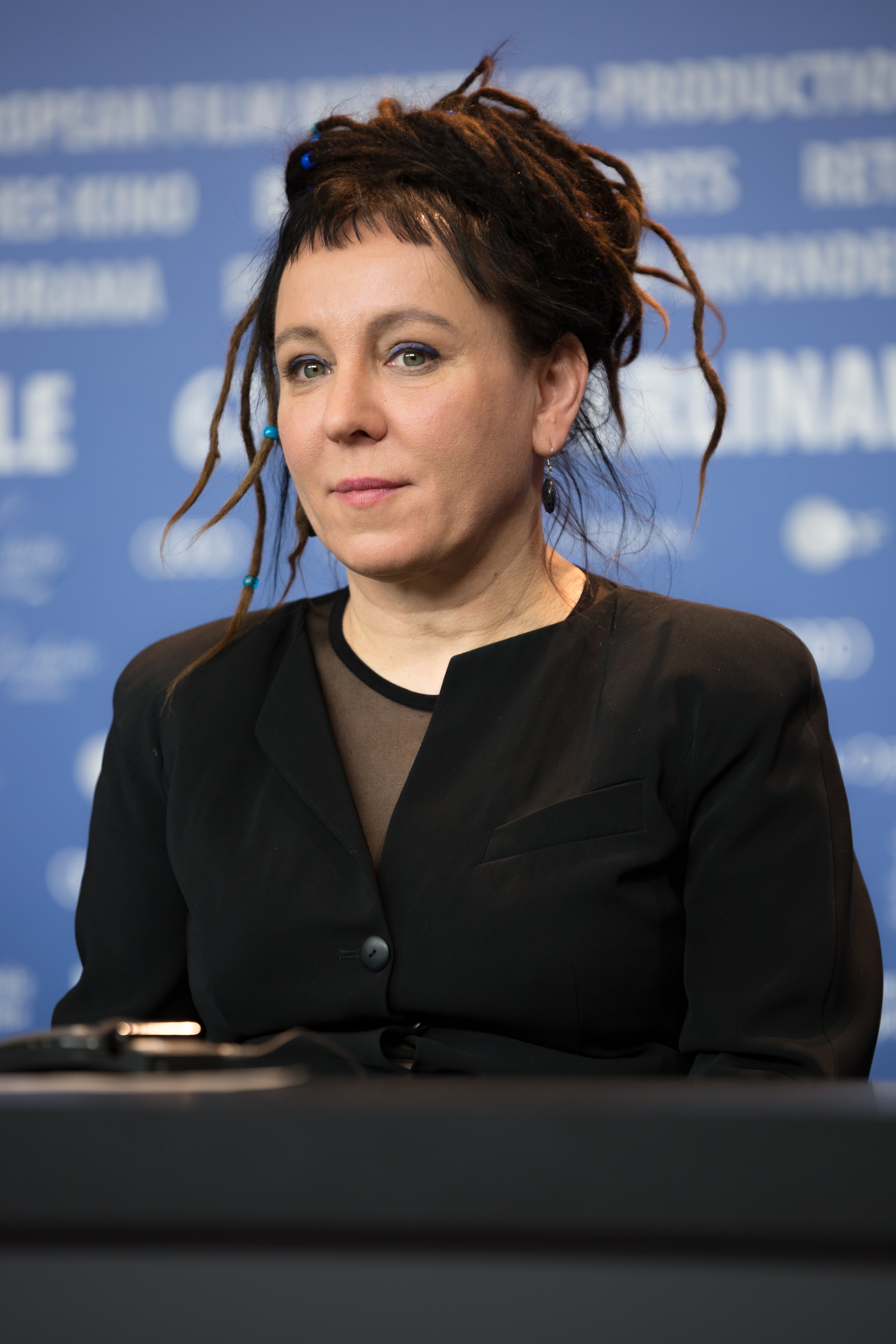
Tokarczuk during presentation of movie Spoor at the Berlinale 2017

==== The Books of Jacob ====
The epic novel The Books of Jacob (2014, English translation 2021 by Jennifer Croft) is a journey over seven borders, five languages, and three major religions. Beginning in 1752 at the historical eastern Galicia region, now western Ukraine, it revolves around the controversial 18th-century Polish-Jewish religious leader and mystic Jacob Frank, among other historical figures, and ends near mid-20th-century Korolówka, Poland, where a family of local Jews had hidden from the Holocaust. Frank, who founded the Frankist sect fighting for the rights and emancipation of the Jews, encouraged his followers to transgress moral boundaries, even promoting orgiastic rites. The Frankists were persecuted in the Jewish community, especially after Frank led his followers to be baptised by the Roman Catholic church. The church later imprisoned him for heresy for more than a decade, only for Frank to declare that he was the messiah. Through third-person accounts, the action takes place in present-day Turkey, Greece, Austria, and Germany, capturing regional spirit, climate, and interesting customs. The Jan Michalski Prize jury wrote:

A work of immense erudition with a powerful epic sweep. [...] The thematic richness is impressive. The story of the Frankists, rendered through a series of mythic narratives, is transformed into a universal epic tale of the struggle against rigid thinking, either religious or philosophical, that ostracize and enslave people. An extensive and prolific work that warns against our inability to embrace an environment complex in its diversity, fueling a fanatical sectarianism which ends in disaster. The Books of Jacob, by telling the past with a dazzling virtuosity, helps us to better understand the world in which we live.

In the historical and ideological divides of Polish literature, the book has been characterized as anti-Sienkiewicz. It was soon acclaimed by critics and readers, but its reception was hostile in some Polish nationalist circles and Tokarczuk was targeted by an online harassment campaign.

==== The Empusium ====
In 2022, she published The Empusium: A Health Resort Horror Story. Inspired by Thomas Mann's The Magic Mountain and the horror genre, it deals with themes such as misogyny and humanity's limited understanding of the world. It was translated into English in 2024 by Antonia Lloyd-Jones.

=== Literary Heights Festival ===
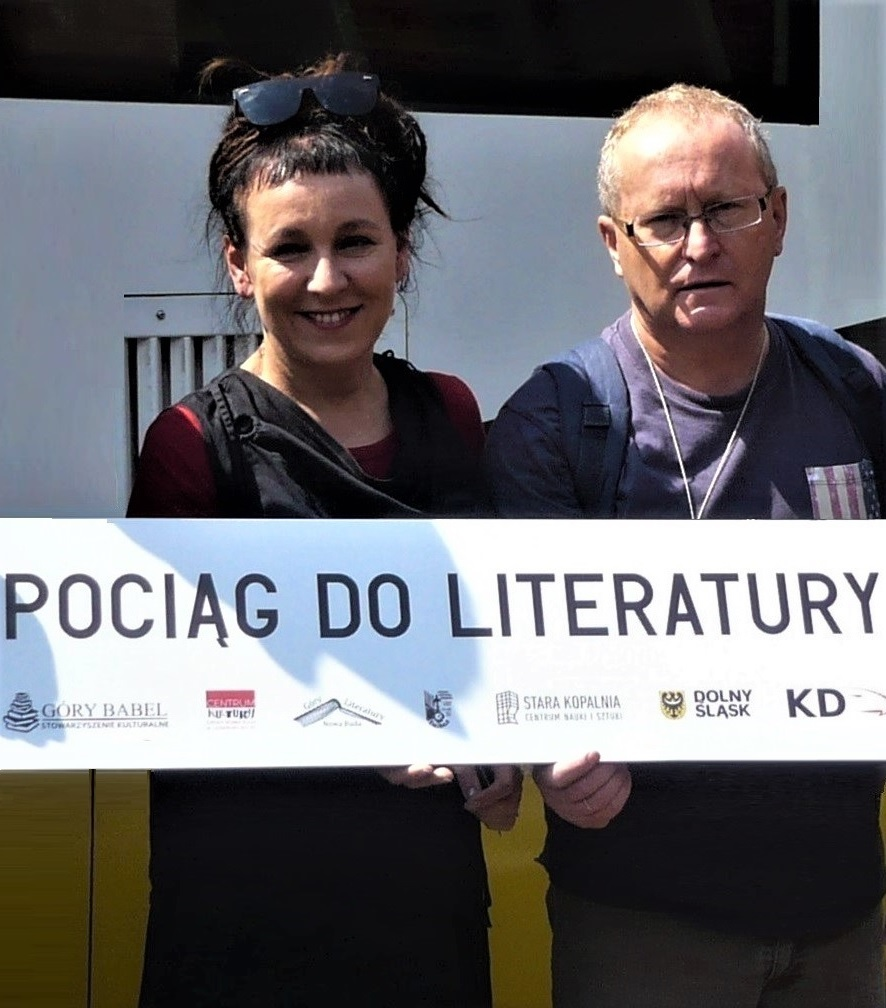
Tokarczuk and Karol Maliszewski at the Literary Heights Festival (2018)

Since its foundation in 2015, Tokarczuk has co-hosted the Literary Heights Festival, which has included events in her village. The festival has a rich program of cultural events, such as educational sessions and workshops, debates, concerts, film screenings, and exhibitions.

=== Olga Tokarczuk Foundation ===
In November 2019, Tokarczuk established an eponymous foundation with a planned wide range of literature-related activities to create a progressive intellectual and artistic centre. It was declared that Polish poet Tymoteusz Karpowicz's villa in Wrocław would be its future seat. Tokarczuk allocated 10% of her Nobel prize money to the body and Agnieszka Holland and Ireneusz Grin have joined the Foundation Council. The foundation started operation in October 2020, implementing educational programs, organizing writing contests and public debates, and funding scholarships for young aspiring writers and international residencies.

== Views ==
Tokarczuk is a leftist and a feminist. She has been criticized by some Polish nationalist groups as unpatriotic, anti-Christian, and a promoter of eco-terrorism. She has denied the allegations, calling herself a "true patriot" and saying that her critics are xenophobic and damage Poland's international reputation. A vocal critic of antisemitism in Poland, Tokarczuk has said, "There's no Polish culture without Jewish culture". She has often denounced Poland for having "committed horrendous acts as colonizers, as a national majority that suppressed the minority [Jews], as slaveowners, and as the murderers of Jews". Her many public denunciations of Polish antisemitism have earned her animosity from some members of the Polish nationalist right.

In 2015, after the publication of The Books of Jacob, Tokarczuk was criticized by the Nowa Ruda Patriots association, which demanded that the town's council revoke her honorary citizenship of Nowa Ruda because, the association claimed, she had tarnished the good name of the Polish nation. Senator Waldemar Bonkowski of the Law and Justice party agreed, calling Tokarczuk's literary output and public statements in "absolute contradiction to the assumptions of the Polish historical politics".

In 2020, Tokarczuk was a signatory, along with other prominent writers such as Margaret Atwood, John Banville, and J. M. Coetzee, of an open letter to President of the European Commission Ursula von der Leyen urging the European Union "to take immediate steps to defend core European values—equality, non-discrimination, respect for minorities—which are being blatantly violated in Poland" and appealing to the Polish government to stop targeting sexual minorities and withdraw support for organizations promoting homophobia.

== Awards and recognition ==
Tokarczuk is a laureate of numerous literary awards in and outside Poland. Her works have become the subject of several dozen academic papers and theses.

Her first recognition, in 2004, was for the English translation (by Antonia Lloyd-Jones) of her 1998 novel House of Day, House of Night, which was shortlisted for the International Dublin Literary Award.

Five of Tokarczuk's books were finalists for the Nike Award, the most important Polish literary accolade, and two of them won the prize: Flights in 2008 and The Books of Jacob in 2015.

In 2010, Tokarczuk received the Silver Medal for Merit to Culture – Gloria Artis. In 2013, she was awarded the Slovene Vilenica Prize.

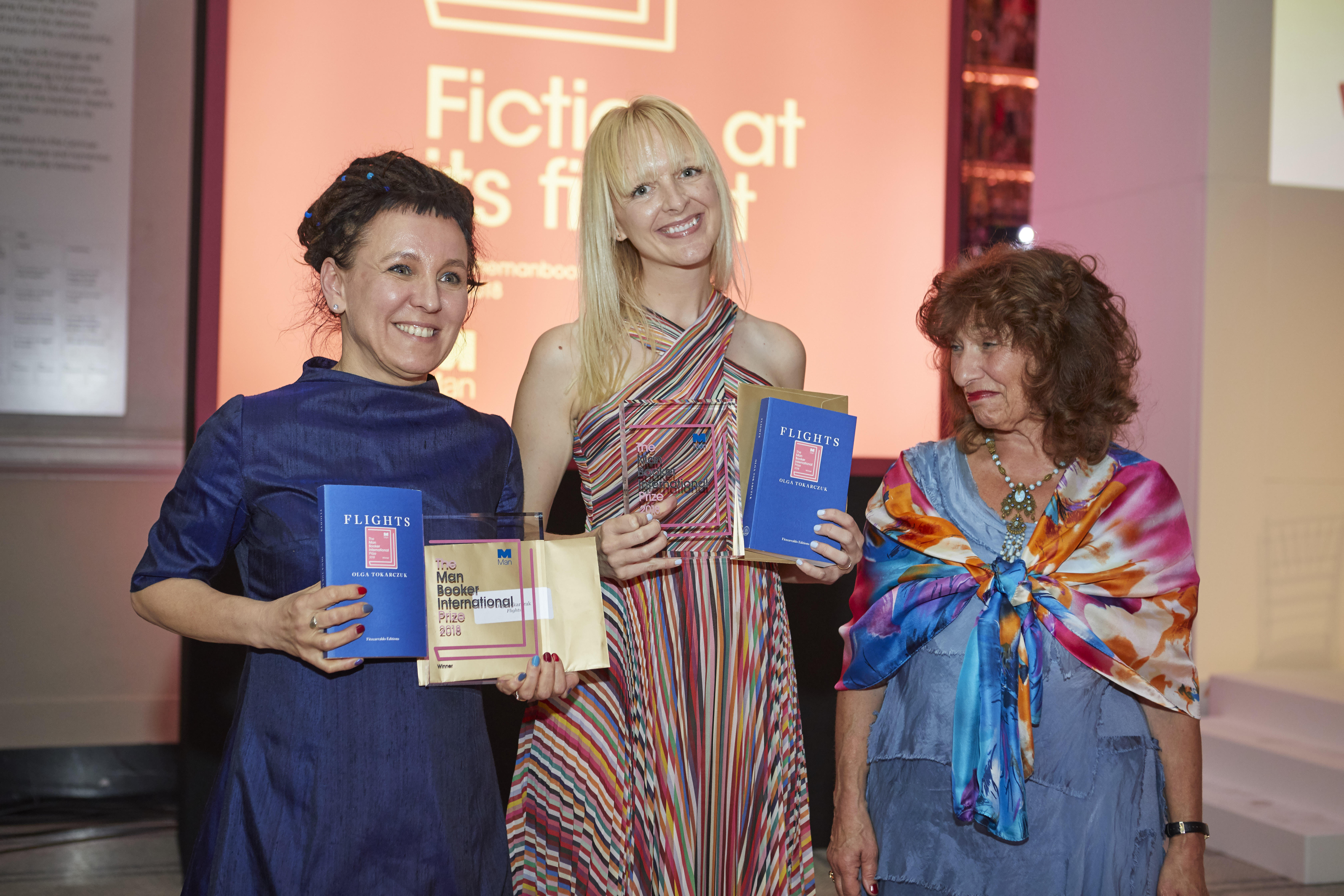
Tokarczuk (left) with Jennifer Croft, translator of Flights and The Books of Jacob, and Lisa Appignanesi, Chair of the 2018 Man Booker International Prize judges

She received the 2015 Brückepreis, the 20th edition of the award granted by the "Europa-City Zgorzelec/Görlitz". The prize is a joint undertaking of the German and Polish border twin cities aimed at advancing mutual, regional, and European peace, understanding, and cooperation among people of different nationalities, cultures, and viewpoints. Particularly appreciated by the jury was Tokarczuk's creation of literary bridges connecting people, generations, and cultures, especially residents of the border territories of Poland, Germany, and the Czech Republic, who have had different existential and historical experiences. Also stressed was Tokarczuk's "rediscovery" and elucidation of the complex multinational and multicultural past of Lower Silesia, an area of great political conflict. Attending the award ceremony in Görlitz, Tokarczuk was impressed by the positive and pragmatic attitude of the mayor of the German town toward the refugee and migrant crisis, which she contrasted with the ideological uproar surrounding the issue in Poland.

For The Books of Jacob, Tokarczuk was awarded the 2016 Kulturhuset Stadsteatern International Literary Prize in Stockholm. The novel's French translation was recognized as the 2018 "Best European novel" by France's cultural magazine Transfuge. It also won the 2018 Swiss Jan Michalski Prize and the 2019 French Prix Laure Bataillon for the best foreign-language book translated in the previous year.

In 2018, Flights (English translation by Jennifer Croft) was awarded the Man Booker International Prize. A year later, Drive Your Plow Over the Bones of the Dead (translation by Antonia Lloyd-Jones) was shortlisted for the 2019 Man Booker International Prize.

In 2019, Tokarczuk was awarded the 2018 Nobel Prize in Literature for "a narrative imagination that with encyclopedic passion represents the crossing of boundaries as a form of life".

In 2020, she received the title of an Honorary Citizen of Warsaw as a recognition of her literary achievements.

In 2021, Tokarczuk received the titles of a Doctor Honoris Causa from the University of Warsaw, University of Wrocław, and then from the Kraków's Jagiellonian University. She also became Honorary Citizen of Kraków.

She was elected a Royal Society of Literature International Writer in November 2021.

In March 2022, The Books of Jacob (translated by Jennifer Croft) was longlisted for the 2022 International Booker Prize, subsequently being shortlisted in April. She was awarded honorary degrees by Sofia University in 2022 and Tel Aviv University in 2023.

In September 2024, the Europese Literatuurprijs was awarded to The Empusium.

In September 2025, Tokarczuk was appointed Vice President of PEN International.

In August 2026, Tokarczuk was honoured with the Halldór Laxness International Literary Prize, a major Icelandic literature award named after Halldór Laxness and bestowed upon an internationally acclaimed writer whose work has played a key role in revitalizing the craft of narrative art. Salman Rushdie, a jury member, observed that "In her work, tragedy, comedy, history and irony come together in an exceptionally rich literary blend."

=== Nobel Prize in Literature ===
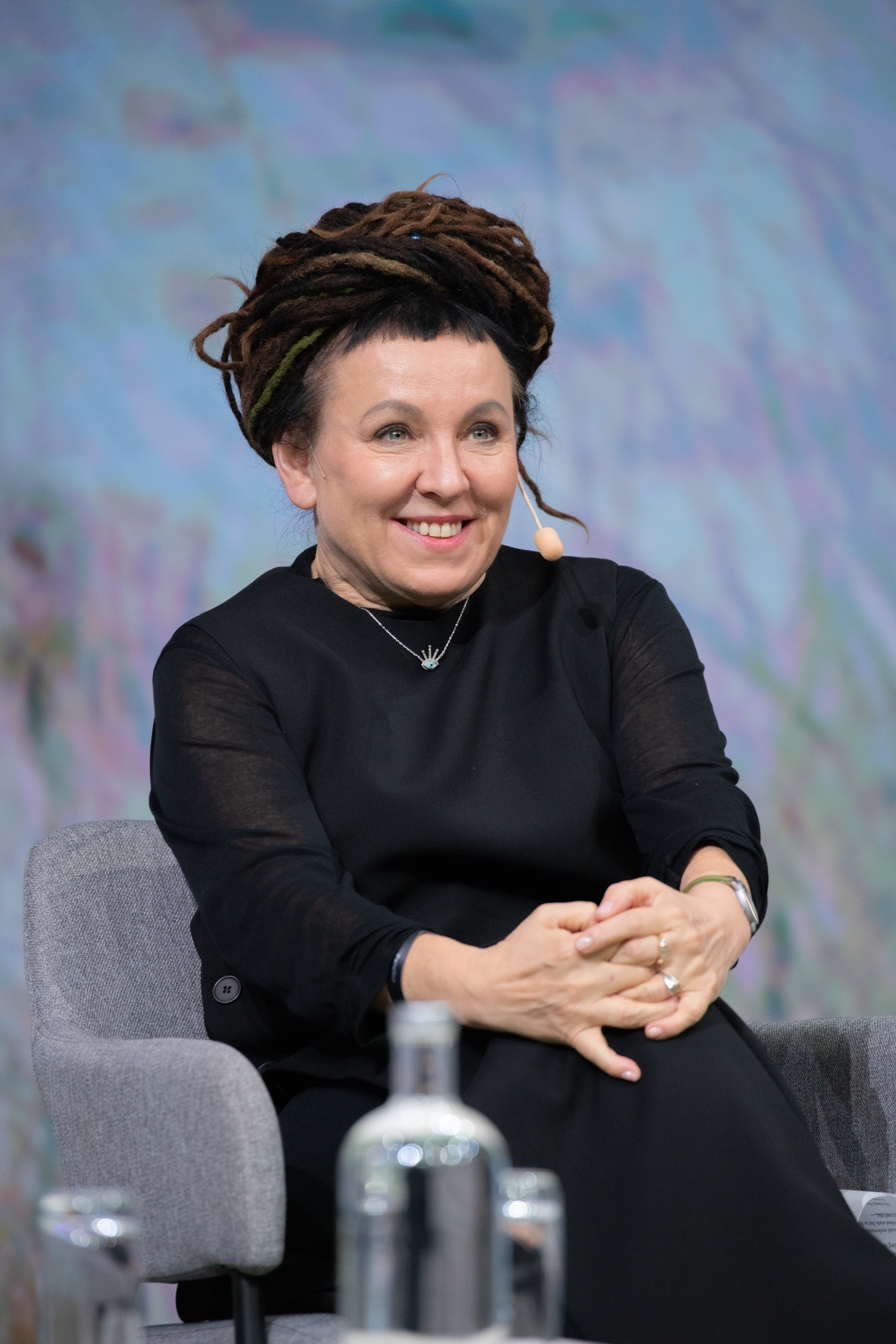
Tokarczuk at 2024 Nobel Week

In 2019, Tokarczuk was awarded the 2018 Nobel Prize in Literature for "a narrative imagination that with encyclopedic passion represents the crossing of boundaries as a form of life". The award had been postponed due to controversy within the Swedish Academy, the body that chooses the laureates for the annual Nobel Prize in Literature.

The choice of Tokarczuk was generally well received. "The Swedish Academy has made many mistakes in recent years", Claire Armitstead wrote in The Guardian, "but in the Polish writer Olga Tokarczuk, it has found not only a fine winner but a culturally important one." In Poland, reaction was divided.

Tokarczuk delivered her Nobel Lecture, The Tender Narrator, at the Swedish Academy on 7 December 2019. In it she spoke about her belief in the power of literature in a world of information overload and divisive narratives.

At the award ceremony in Stockholm on 10 December 2019, Per Wästberg of the Swedish Academy said of Tokarczuk:

Her fusion of intensive embodiment and ephemeral unreality, intimate observation and mythological obsession, make her one of our time's most original prose writers, with new ways of viewing reality. She is a virtuoso of instant portraiture, capturing characters in the act of escaping daily life. She writes of what no one else does: "the world's excruciating strangeness". Her prose—drastic, rich in ideas—is in nomadic movement throughout her fifteen or so books. Her villages are centres of the universe, the place a protagonist, its singular destinies woven into a fresco of fable and myth.

== Bibliography ==
Novels

- Podróż ludzi Księgi (Journey of the People of the Book), 1993
- E.E., 1995
- Prawiek i inne czasy, 1996 (Primeval and Other Times, 2010)
- Dom dzienny, dom nocny, 1998 (House of Day, House of Night, 2002)
- Ostatnie historie (Final stories), 2017
- Anna In w grobowcach świata (Anna In in the tombs of the world), 2006
- Bieguni, 2007 (Flights, 2018)
- Prowadź swój pług przez kości umarłych, 2009 (Drive Your Plow Over the Bones of the Dead, 2019)
- Księgi Jakubowe, 2014 (The Books of Jacob, 2022)
- Empuzjon, 2022 (The Empusium, 2024)

== See also ==
- List of Polish Nobel laureates
- Polish literature
- List of Poles: Literature
