= Jennifer Croft =

American author, critic and translator

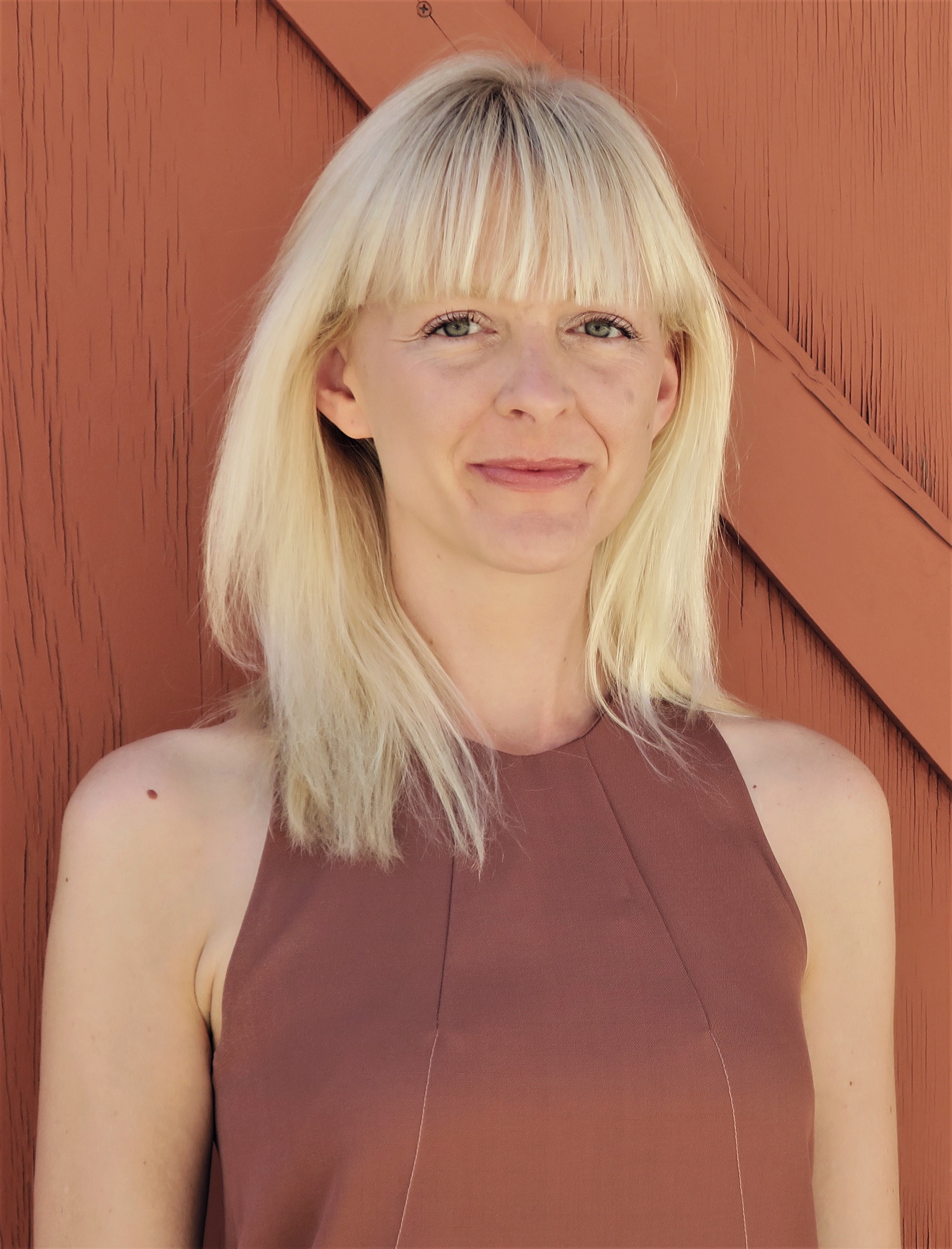
- Croft in 2017
- Born: 1981 or 1982 (age 44–45)
- Education: University of Tulsa (BA); University of Iowa (MFA); Northwestern University (PhD)
- Occupations: Author; critic; translator

Jennifer Croft is an American writer and translator from Tulsa, Oklahoma. She won a 2022 Guggenheim Fellowship for her novel The Extinction of Irena Rey, a national bestseller and a Wall Street Journal best book of 2024. It has been translated into nine languages.

Croft also won the 2020 William Saroyan International Prize for Writing for her illustrated memoir Homesick, which was later published as a novel in the UK and shortlisted for the James Tait Black Prize--Britain's oldest literary award--and longlisted for the Women's Prize. The original Spanish-language version of the book was also published as a novel. Croft has expressed ambivalence about genre labels and enthusiasm about mixing genres and even media.

In 2018, Croft received the International Booker Prize for her translation from Polish of Olga Tokarczuk's Flights. She has since advocated for broader recognition for the work and identify of the translator and for the power of collaboration in the arts.

== Education ==
Croft grew up in Tulsa, Oklahoma, where she entered the University of Tulsa at age 15. After completing her BA at the University of Tulsa in 2001, she learned Polish at the University of Iowa, where she did her MFA in literary translation. She lived in Warsaw, Poland for two years on a Fulbright scholarship. As she said in one of her interviews, "Polish has always been more of an academic and professional connection for me, but I try to go back to Kraków or Warsaw at least once a year to maintain that connection". It was during her time in Warsaw that she met author Olga Tokarczuk with whom she worked on the novels Flights and The Books of Jacob, along with essays and short stories.

She learned her Spanish in Buenos Aires, Argentina, and says of her work translating Argentine Spanish,

I only translate works from Spanish that were written by Argentine authors—there’s such great diversity among the different Spanishes, and I’ve always felt it’s really important to be fully familiar with all the little components of speech, the quotidian rhythms writers employ and depart from. It's important for me to be able to hear the tone of a sentence, picture the facial expression and gestures that would accompany it, in order to find a fitting rendition in English.

Croft received a PhD in Comparative Literary Studies from Northwestern University.

== Personal life ==
Croft is married to Ukrainian-American poet and translator Boris Dralyuk. They have twins who were born in 2022. She has been a vegetarian since the age of nine.

== Career ==
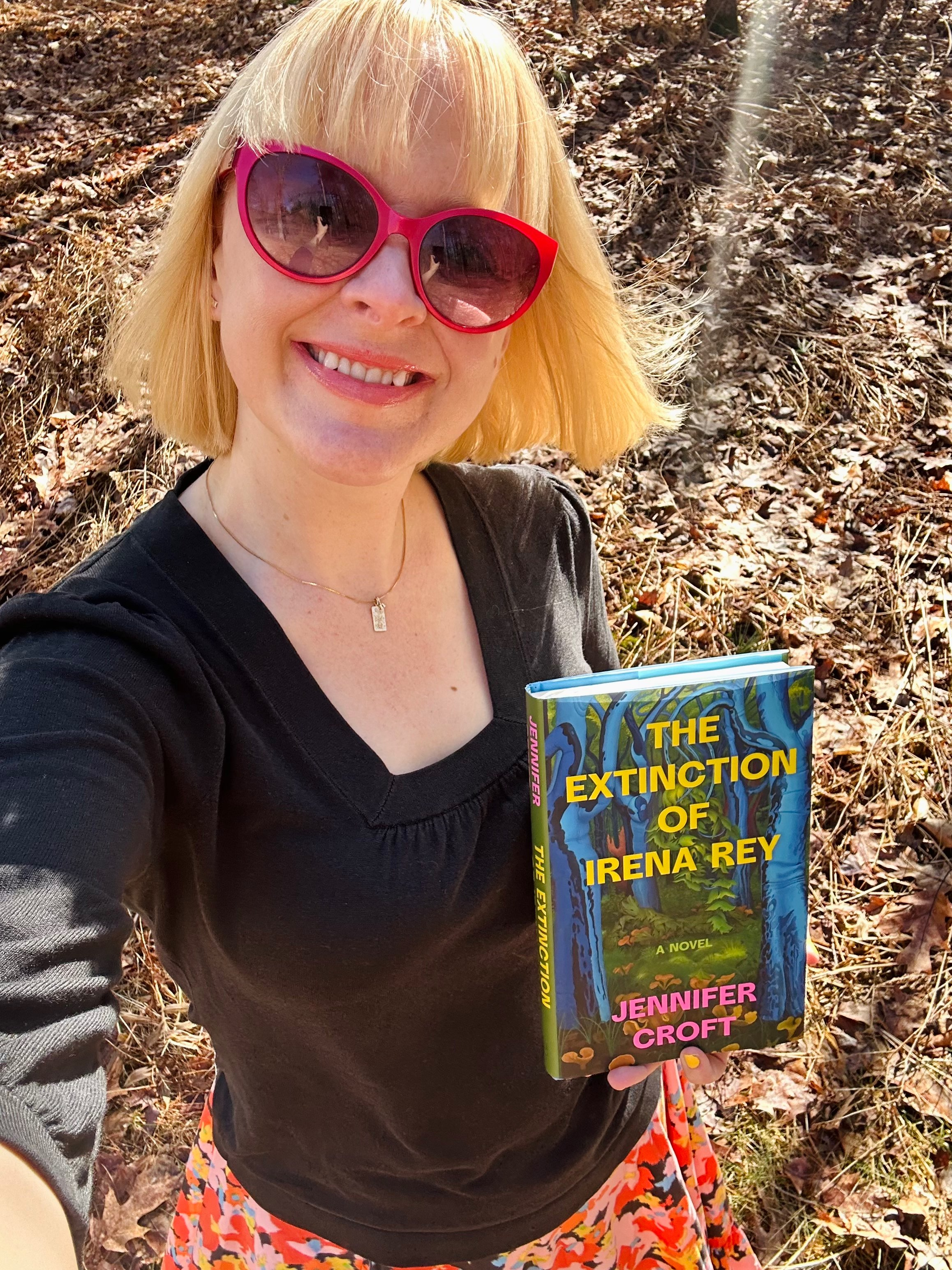
Jennifer Croft holding her novel on book tour

Croft translated Romina Paula's August (Feminist Press, 2017), Federico Falco's A Perfect Cemetery (Charco Press, 2021), Pedro Mairal's The Woman from Uruguay (Bloomsbury Publishing, 2021), Tina Oziewicz's What Feelings Do When No One's Looking (Elsewhere Editions, 2022), Sylvia Molloy's Dislocations (Charco Press, 2022), and Sebastián Martínez Daniell's Two Sherpas (Charco Press, 2023). Her translation of Tokarczuk's Flights from Polish was published by Fitzcarraldo Editions in May 2017. Croft has also translated Tokarczuk's novel Księgi Jakubowe (The Books of Jacob), which won the Nike Award in 2015.

With her essay in The Guardian, "Why translators should be named on book covers," Croft launched the #TranslatorsOnTheCover campaign in cooperation with the Society of Authors and the author Mark Haddon. The campaign has raised awareness of the collaborative nature of translated literature by foregrounding the identity of the translator, who, Croft argues, is the person who writes every word of the translated work.

Her debut novel The Extinction of Irena Rey was published in 2024. Publishers Weekly wrote that Croft, "serves up a wickedly funny mystery involving an internationally famous author and her translators". Croft began writing the novel, which was inspired by a trip to the Bialowieza Forest on the border of Poland and Belarus, in 2017.

== Awards ==
Croft is the recipient of Guggenheim, Cullman, Fulbright, PEN, MacDowell, Fondation Jan Michalski, Yaddo, and National Endowment for the Arts grants and fellowships, as well as the inaugural Michael Henry Heim Prize for Translation and a Tin House Scholarship for Homesick.

With the author Olga Tokarczuk, Croft won the 2018 Man Booker International Prize.

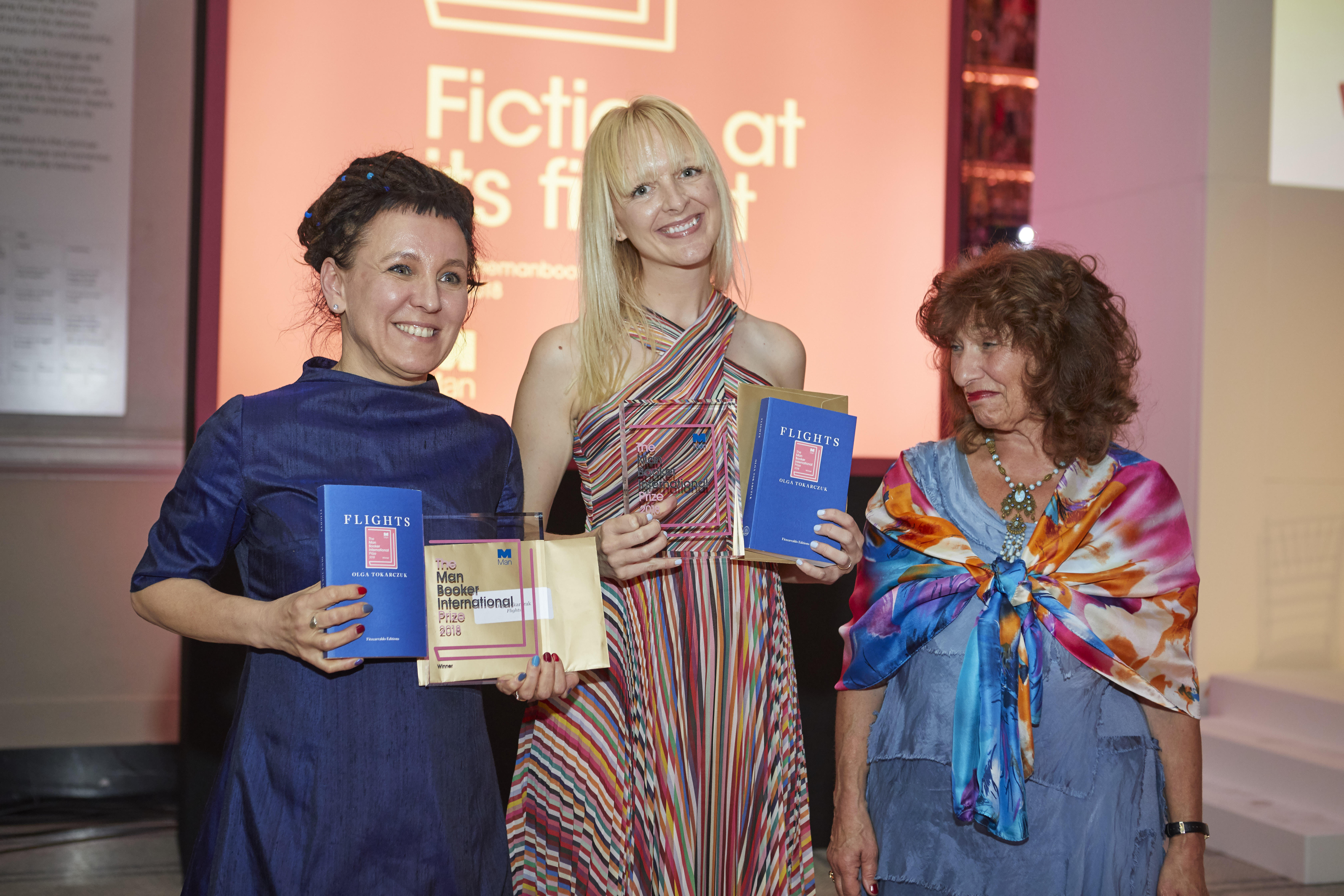
Olga Tokarczuk and Jennifer Croft with Lisa Appignanesi OBE, chair of the judges for the 2018 Man Booker International Prize

On being asked what drew her to the writer's work, Jennifer Croft has said,

I stumbled upon Olga Tokarczuk’s first short-story collection, Playing Many Drums, in 2003 as I prepared for a Fulbright at the University of Warsaw, where I would continue to study literary translation. Right away I loved her soothing, nuanced style, but I think the thing that appealed to me most was her psychological acuity, her ability to distill the essence of a person—I say "person" since her characters are so alive it’s hard for me to call them characters—and set in motion relationships that might charm and shock us at the same time, all while feeling both familiar and fresh.

On being asked specifically about the novel Flights, Croft said,

Tokarczuk calls Flights a "constellation" novel, which partly means she brings lots of different ideas and stories and voices into relationship with one another via the lines the reader draws between them. This made the translation process both challenging and particularly delightful, since I was able to tap into a fresh subject every time I sat down to my computer. One minute I was worrying about the woman who flies back to Poland from New Zealand to kill a dying childhood friend; the next I was amused by the foibles of the Internet; the next I was rethinking my own approach to travel, or to my body. I could go on and on. I loved translating this book.

In March 2022, Croft's translation of Tokarczuk's The Books of Jacob was longlisted for the 2022 Man Booker International Prize. subsequently being shortlisted in April.

Croft received the 2020 William Saroyan International Prize for Writing for her illustrated memoir Homesick, which was originally written as a novel in Spanish in 2014 and was published in Argentina under its original title, Serpientes y escaleras. According to Croft, "Neither the Spanish nor the English is a translation." In 2022, she was also awarded a Guggenheim Fellowship for her novel The Extinction of Irena Rey, which was published by Bloomsbury on March 5, 2024. Her short story "Anaheim," published by The Kenyon Review, was nominated for a 2023 Pushcart Prize.

Croft was awarded a 2023 American Academy of Arts and Letters Award in literature.

== Bibliography ==
=== As author ===
- — (2019). Homesick. Los Angeles: Unnamed Press. ISBN 978-1-944700-94-2.
- — (2021). Serpientes y escaleras. Buenos Aires: Editorial Entropía. ISBN 978-987-1768-69-1.
- — (2024). The Extinction of Irena Rey. New York: Bloomsbury Publishing. ISBN 978-1-63973-170-1.
- --- (2026) Notes on Postcards. New York: Catapult Books. ISBN 978-1646221035.
