= Drive Your Plow Over the Bones of the Dead =

2009 crime novel by Olga Tokarczuk

- First edition cover (Polish)
- Author: Olga Tokarczuk
- Audio read by: Beata Poźniak
- Original title: Prowadź swój pług przez kości umarłych
- Translator: Antonia Lloyd-Jones
- Language: Polish
- Set in: Silesia
- Publisher: Wydawnictwo Literackie
- Publication date: 25 November 2009
- Publication place: Kraków
- English publication date: 12 September 2018
- Media type: Print (hardcover and paperback) and e-book
- Pages: 318
- ISBN: 978-83-08-04398-1
- Dewey Decimal: 891.8/537
- LC Class: PG7179.O37 P76 2009

Drive Your Plow Over the Bones of the Dead (Polish: Prowadź swój pług przez kości umarłych) is a 2009 mystery novel by Olga Tokarczuk. Originally published in Polish by Wydawnictwo Literackie, it was later translated to English by Antonia Lloyd-Jones and published in 2018 by the British independent publisher Fitzcarraldo Editions. The book received a wider release in 2019 when it was published in the United States by Riverhead Books on 13 August 2019. A portion of the English translation was originally published in literary magazine Granta in 2017.

The novel was shortlisted for the 2019 International Booker Prize. Antonia Lloyd-Jones's translation was also longlisted for the 2019 National Book Award for Translated Literature. Tokarczuk was awarded the 2018 Nobel Prize in Literature two months after the novel's US release. In 2020, it was shortlisted for the International Dublin Literary Award.

== Plot ==
Janina Duszejko is an ageing woman who lives in a rural Polish village, located near the Czech border in the Silesia region, in between Lewin and Kłodzko. A former teacher who now looks after her neighbors' summer houses, she spends most of her time studying astrology and helping her friend Dizzy translate the poetry of William Blake into Polish. She lives alone; she had two dogs long ago who both disappeared. One day, Janina's neighbour Oddball comes to tell her that he has found their neighbour Big Foot dead. From Janina and Oddball's visit to Big Foot's cabin, it seems Big Foot choked on a bone while eating. Janina also finds a shocking photograph in Big Foot's house, the contents of which are revealed in the penultimate chapter. Janina disliked Big Foot, a frequent hunter, because she abhors the violence and suffering humans inflict on animals. She begins to believe that animals could have killed Big Foot out of vengeance. She writes to the local police, who ignore her theory. The scoffing police commander, whom Janina refers to as the Commandant, is also a hunter. Later, Dizzy and Janina find him dead beside his car on a rough road. The Commandant's death emboldens Janina's beliefs about animal revenge, but her friends Dizzy and Oddball remain skeptical. The police question Dizzy and Janina as witnesses to the crime scene. One officer accuses Janina of seeming to value the life of animals more than that of humans. Janina retorts that she values both equally.

Subsequently, Innerd, a local brothel owner and wealthy fur farmer who breeds white foxes, goes missing. His shady dealings lead residents to suspect he has fled from financial threats, or possibly run away with a lover. Meanwhile, a hiker named Borys, spelled "Boros" by Janina, appears in the village. He is an entomologist researching endangered beetles and hopes to convince the Polish government to protect them from extinction. Janina comes to enjoy his company, and allows him to stay with her. The two eventually become romantically involved. Eventually Innerd's decomposed body is discovered in the forest, an animal snare around his leg. Janina, Boros, and Dizzy argue theories of human or animal attacks. Weeks later, a third villager is killed: the leader of a local social club and hunting association, whom Janina calls "the President", is found dead after a drunken festival. His body is covered in beetles.

In November, the village plans a celebration for the opening and consecration of a new Catholic chapel in honor of Saint Hubert, the patron saint of hunters. Father Rustle, a friend of the President and avid hunter himself, is its priest. In his opening sermon, Father Rustle praises hunters, calling them "ambassadors and partners of the Lord God in the work of creation". Janina interrupts the sermon, shouting at Rustle and the rest of the villagers. She asks: "Have you fallen asleep? How can you listen to such nonsense without batting an eyelid? Have you lost your minds? Or your hearts? Have you still got hearts?" Days later, the presbytery burns down and Father Rustle is found dead.

Dizzy and Oddball confront Janina, telling her they know she did it and the circumstances of the President's death gave her away. Janina shows her friends the photograph she found at Big Foot's house, which shows Big Foot, the Commandant, Innerd, the President, and Father Rustle standing near recently killed animals, including her two dogs. Big Foot, she explains, really did choke on a deer bone, but this event, and her discovery of the photograph, inspired her to kill the next four men.

The next day, police arrive at Janina's house and search it, but she evades capture. Janina flees on foot to the Czech Republic and is then taken by Boros to live in hiding, on the edge of the Białowieża Forest, where she can again be close to nature.

== Style ==
The novel features an unreliable narrator. The protagonist and narrator, Janina, describes the murders that took place without admitting that she herself committed those crimes, until almost the end of the novel. The reader is invited to empathize with the character by sharing her deep concern for the environment and the welfare of animals. Her characterization as an eccentric old lady, that is often treated with skepticism or even derision by other characters, further endears her. In a 2018 interview with The Guardian, Tokarczuk cited Leonora Carrington's 1974 novel The Hearing Trumpet, which also features an unreliable narrator, as an influence on Drive Your Plow Over the Bones of the Dead.

== Title ==
The book draws its title from William Blake's poem "Proverbs of Hell".

In seed time learn, in harvest teach, in winter enjoy.
Drive your cart and your plow over the bones of the dead.

== Reception ==
Kirkus Reviews praised the novel, writing, "Tokarczuk's novel is a riot of quirkiness and eccentricity, and the mood of the book, which shifts from droll humor to melancholy to gentle vulnerability, is unclassifiable—and just right. Tokarczuk's mercurial prose seems capable of just about anything." Publishers Weekly called the novel "astounding" and wrote that it "succeeds as both a suspenseful murder mystery and a powerful and profound meditation on human existence and how a life fits into the world around it." Writing for The Guardian, author Sarah Perry favourably reviewed the novel, saying, "It is an astonishing amalgam of thriller, comedy and political treatise, written by a woman who combines an extraordinary intellect with an anarchic sensibility."

In 2019, it was ranked 75th on The Guardian's list of the 100 best books of the 21st century.

== Adaptations ==
=== Film ===
The novel was adapted into film in 2017, titled Spoor (Polish: Pokot), directed by Polish director Agnieszka Holland. The film won the Alfred Bauer Prize (Silver Bear) at the 67th Berlin International Film Festival.

=== Theatre ===
The novel was adapted into a theatre play by Complicité, touring from December 2022 to June 2023 to: Theatre Royal, Plymouth; Bristol Old Vic; Oxford Playhouse; Barbican Centre, London; Nottingham Playhouse; Belgrade Theatre, Coventry; The Lowry, Salford; Grand Théâtre de Luxembourg; Odéon-Théâtre de l'Europe, Paris.

=== Audio ===
Polish actress Beata Poźniak narrated the English translation of Drive Your Plow Over the Bones of the Dead for Penguin Random House released on 13 August 2019. She received an Earphones Award for best audiobook interpretation.

In May 2020, Fitzcarraldo Editions released an audiobook in the UK read by the book's translator, Antonia Lloyd-Jones.
