= House of Day, House of Night =

Novel by Olga Tokarczuk

- First edition cover (Wydawnictwo Ruta, 1998)
- Author: Olga Tokarczuk
- Original title: Dom dzienny, dom nocny
- Translator: Antonia Lloyd-Jones
- Language: Polish
- Publisher: Wydawnictwo Ruta
- Publication date: 1998
- Publication place: Wałbrzych
- English publication date: 2002
- Media type: Print
- Pages: 277
- ISBN: 9788390028194
- OCLC: 41258229
- Dewey Decimal: 891.8/5373
- LC Class: PG7179.O37 D66

House of Day, House of Night (Polish: Dom dzienny, dom nocny) is a novel by Olga Tokarczuk, published by Wydawnictwo Ruta in 1998.

== Synopsis ==
Although nominally a novel, House of Day, House of Night is rather a patchwork of loosely connected disparate stories, sketches, and essays about life past and present in the author's adopted home of Krajanów, a Polish village in the Sudetes near the Polish-Czech border. While some have labeled the novel Tokarczuk's most "difficult" piece, at least for those unfamiliar with Central European history, it was her first book to be published in English.

== Publication ==
Dom dzienny, dom nocny was first published by Tokarczuk's independent publishing company Wydawnictwo Ruta in 1998.

In 1999, the book sold 40,000 copies, which placed it sixth overall among the year's bestsellers written by Polish authors.

In late 2000, Bertelsmann published the novel on the Internet. For this reason, Dom dzienny, dom nocny became the first novel in Poland to be published on the Internet in electronic form. The book was made available as a plain text file on the Świat Książki website. This event is considered to be the beginning of the e-book market in Poland.

=== Translation ===
The novel was translated into English as House of Day, House of Night by translator Antonia Lloyd-Jones. It was first published in the United Kingdom by Granta Books in 2002. In 2003, it was published in the United States by Northwestern University Press. Fitzcarraldo Editions republished the translation in September 2025.

== Reception ==
In a review from 1998, Jarosław Klejnocki described the novel as "Olga Tokarczuk's most ambitious prose project", and also indicated that it integrates different styles and genres. Dariusz Nowacki, who was previously critical Tokarczuk, regarded the novel as the first praiseworthy work in her oeuvre. Kinga Dunin praised Tokarczuk for finding her unique voice in the novel; Dunin also felt that the novel would help readers cope with death anxiety. Przemysław Czapliński described it as "one of the most beautiful sylwa" in Polish literature.

In 1998, the novel won the Władysław Reymont Award.

The novel was awarded the Nike Award's audience prize for 1999.

== Awards and honours ==
Year	Award	Result	Ref.
2004	International Dublin Literary Award	Shortlisted	
1999	Nike Audience Award	Won	
1998	Władysław Reymont Award	Won	
