= Flights (novel) =

2007 novel by Olga Tokarczuk

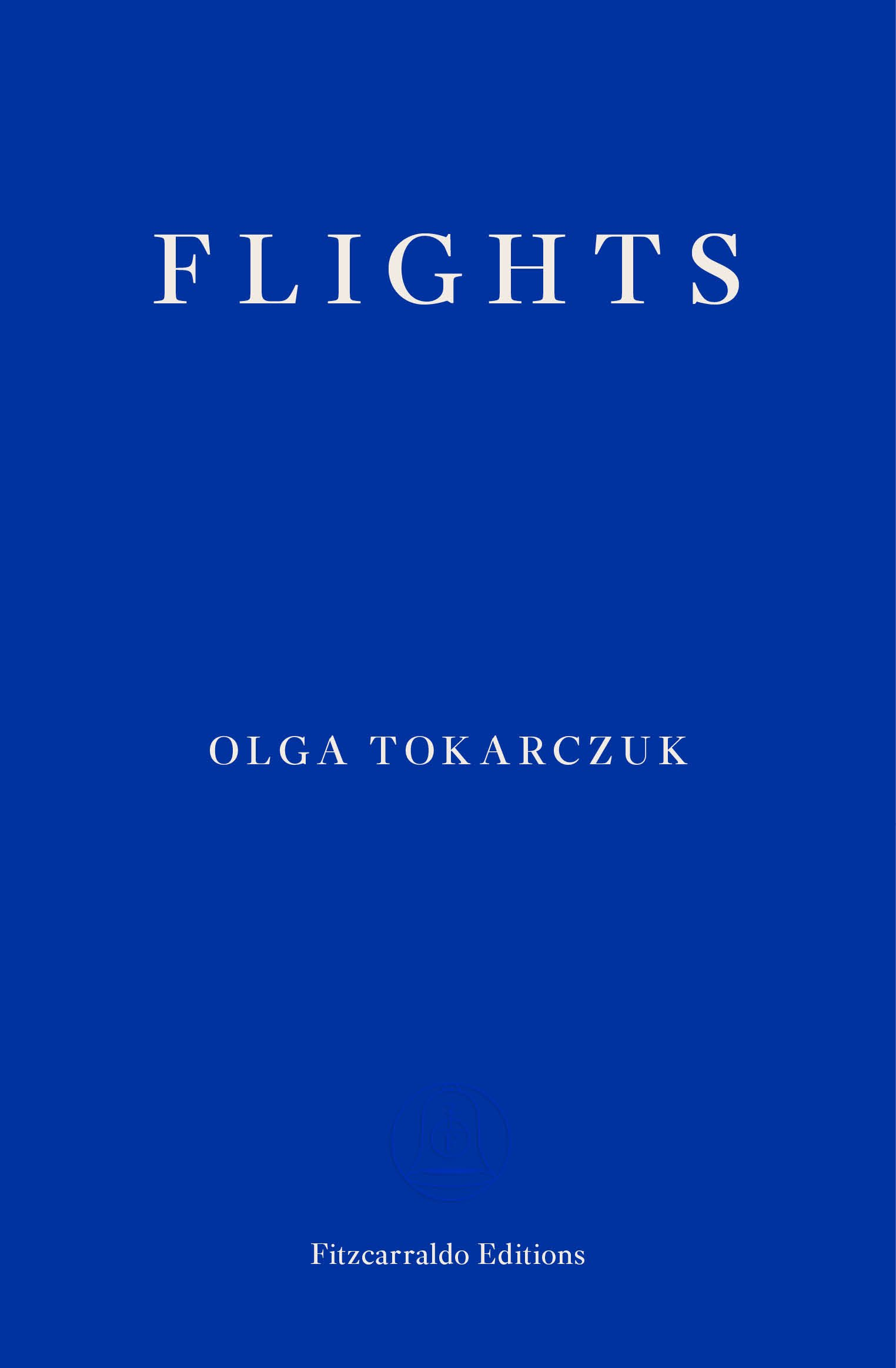
- First English edition
- Author: Olga Tokarczuk
- Original title: Bieguni
- Translator: Jennifer Croft
- Language: English
- Genre: Fiction
- Set in: 17th–21st century
- Published: 2007 (Polish); 2017 (English)
- Publisher: Wydawnictwo Literackie (Polish); Fitzcarraldo Editions (English)
- Media type: Print, digital
- Pages: 416
- Awards: Man Booker International Prize; Nike Award
- ISBN: 1910695432 (Fitzcarraldo Editions)

Flights (Polish: Bieguni, lit. 'runners') is a 2007 fragmentary novel by the Polish author Olga Tokarczuk. The book was translated into English by Jennifer Croft. The original Polish title refers to runaways (runners, bieguni), a sect of Old Believers, who believe that being in constant motion is a trick to avoid evil.

Set between the 17th and 21st centuries, the novel is a "philosophical rumination on modern-day travel". It is structured as a series of vignettes, some fictional, and some based on fact – among them that of the Dutch anatomist Philip Verheyen's study of the achilles tendon, and the story of Ludwika Jędrzejewicz, the sister of the Polish composer Frédéric Chopin, transporting his heart back to Warsaw.

The novel won the Man Booker International Prize in 2018, marking the first time a Polish author received the award. The chair of the judging panel, Lisa Appignanesi, described Tokarczuk as a "writer of wonderful wit, imagination, and literary panache". Tokarczuk and Croft shared the £50,000 prize.

== Structure ==
The novel is split into 116 short pieces, some only one sentence long, others as long as 31 pages. These vignettes are all narrated by the same "nameless female traveller". The book does not focus on any specific story, but on a cultural phenomenon: travel.

== Reception ==
=== Critical reception ===
Kirkus Reviews stated that the book was "a welcome introduction to a major author and a pleasure for fans of contemporary European literature." The Guardian described it as "extraordinary" and "a passionate and enchantingly discursive plea for meaningful connectedness". Tokarczuk's writing in Flights has been compared to that of W. G. Sebald, Milan Kundera, and László Krasznahorkai, among others. Parul Sehgal of The New York Times said of Tokarczuk's narrator that she is "coolly evasive in the way of Rachel Cusk’s heroine in the Outline trilogy".

=== Awards and accolades ===
In 2008, the Polish version of the book won the Nike Award, Poland's highest literary award.

In 2018, the English translation of the book won the Man Booker International Prize. Summarising the decision of the judges' panel, its chair, Lisa Appignanesi, said "we loved the voice of the narrative – it's one that moves from wit and gleeful mischief to real emotional texture and has the ability to create character very quickly, with interesting digression and speculation."
