= The Books of Jacob =

2014 epic novel by Olga Tokarczuk

- First edition cover (Wydawnictwo Literackie, 2014)
- Author: Olga Tokarczuk
- Original title: Księgi Jakubowe
- Translator: Jennifer Croft
- Language: Polish
- Genre: Historical fiction
- Publisher: Wydawnictwo Literackie
- Publication date: October 2014
- Publication place: Poland
- English publication date: 15 November 2021
- Media type: Print (hardcover)
- Pages: 912
- Awards: Nike Award (2015)
- ISBN: 978-83-08-04939-6
- OCLC: 898158997
- Dewey Decimal: 891.8538
- LC Class: PG7179.O37 K75 2014

The Books of Jacob (Note: Full English title: The Books of Jacob, or: A Fantastic Journey Across Seven Borders, Five Languages, and Three Major Religions, Not Counting the Minor Sects. Told by the Dead, Supplemented by the Author, Drawing from a Range of Books, and Aided by Imagination, the Which Being the Greatest Natural Gift of Any Person. That the Wise Might Have It for a Record, That My Compatriots Reflect, Laypersons Gain Some Understanding, and Melancholy Souls Obtain Some Slight Enjoyment.) (Polish: Księgi Jakubowe (Note: Full title: Księgi Jakubowe albo Wielka podróż przez siedem granic, pięć języków i trzy duże religie, nie licząc tych małych. Opowiadana przez zmarłych, a przez autorkę dopełniona metodą koniektury, z wielu rozmaitych ksiąg zaczerpnięta, a także wspomożona imaginacją, która to jest największym naturalnym darem człowieka. Mądrym dla memoryału, kompatriotom dla refleksji, laikom dla nauki, melancholikom zaś dla rozrywki.) (Note: Full stylized title: KSIĘGI JAKUBOWE albo WIELKA PODRÓŻ przez siedem granic, pięć języków i trzy duże religie, nie licząc tych małych. Opowiadana przez ZMARŁYCH, a przez AUTORKĘ dopełniona metodą KONIEKTURY, z wielu rozmaitych KSIĄG zaczerpnięta, a także wspomożona IMAGINACJĄ, która to jest największym naturalnym DAREM człowieka. Mądrym dla Memoryału, Kompatriotom dla Refleksji, Laikom dla Nauki, Melancholikom zaś dla Rozrywki.)) is an epic historical novel by Olga Tokarczuk, published by Wydawnictwo Literackie in October 2014. It is Tokarczuk's ninth novel and is the product of extensive historical research, taking her seven years to write.

The Books of Jacob is a 912-page novel divided into seven books. It begins in 1752 in Rohatyn and ends in Holocaust-era Korolówka. Its title subject is Jacob Frank, a Polish Jew who claimed to be the messiah. The novel combines dozens of third-person perspectives of those connected to Jacob Frank.

Upon publication, it was an instant best-seller and won Poland's most prestigious literary prize, the Nike Award. By October 2015, the novel's circulation had reached 100,000 copies. When Tokarczuk was awarded the 2018 Nobel Prize in Literature, the Nobel Committee said that it was "very impressed" by The Books of Jacob. An English translation by Jennifer Croft was published by Fitzcarraldo Editions on 15 November 2021. Croft won a 2015 PEN/Heim Translation Fund Grant for The Books of Jacob. A US publication by Riverhead Books was released on 1 February 2022.

== Reception ==
Writing for Gazeta Wyborcza, Przemysław Czapliński wrote that the novel "revolutionizes the image of religious life in the 18th century, but also changes the perception of the Polish–Lithuanian Commonwealth."

Writing for Polityka, Justyna Sobolewska wrote that "Tokarczuk proved that it is possible to write an over 900-page novel, full of pictorial descriptions, religious disputes and letters, which keeps you in suspense" and called it an "extremely interesting panorama of 18th-century Poland."

In regard to the historical and ideological divides of Polish literature, the novel has been characterized as anti-Sienkiewicz. It was soon acclaimed by critics and readers alike, but its reception has been hostile in some Polish nationalistic circles and Olga Tokarczuk became a target of an internet hate and harassment campaign.

=== English translation ===
Upon publication in the UK, the book garnered critical acclaim. In The Guardian, Marcel Theroux writes that, "[d]ense, captivating and weird, The Books of Jacob is on a different scale from either" of her previous novels translated into English. "It is a visionary novel that conforms to a particular notion of masterpiece – long, arcane and sometimes inhospitable. Tokarczuk is wrestling with the biggest philosophical themes [...]." He goes on to compare it to John Milton's Paradise Lost and concludes that the novel is one that "will be a landmark in the life of any reader with the appetite to tackle it." Anthony Cummins of The Observer writes that the book is a "panorama of early Enlightenment Europe that doubles as an open-minded study in the mysteries of charisma, it is perhaps above all – and aptly – a gargantuan act of faith, a novel in which your reading has barely begun by the time you’ve turned the last of its 900 pages." Catherine Taylor, writing for Prospect, calls The Books of Jacob an "extraordinary 1,000-page novel", comparing it to Leo Tolstoy's War and Peace and Hilary Mantel's Thomas Cromwell trilogy. Of the English translation, Taylor has the following to say: "Huge credit must be given to Croft, whose magnificent, lively translation is also a work of pure scholarship: the multiple voices, styles, landscapes and inventories she renders into English bring this lost world vividly to life." Concluding, she singles out the subject of Jewish life in Poland of Frank's time as being at the core of the novel: "Tokarczuk's determination in this tremendous work to recast and restore to Poland's past its vanished Jewish culture has never been more necessary." Antonia Senior, in The Times, calls the book "a work of genius."

== Awards ==
The Books of Jacob was awarded the 2015 Nike Award Jury prize, Poland's most prestigious literary prize. It also received Nike's Audience award for 2015.

The novel was shortlisted for the 2015 Angelus Award.

The Swedish translation by Jan Henrik Swahn was awarded in 2016 with the first international prize awarded by the Stockholm institution Kulturhuset Stadsteatern.

The French translation by Maryla Laurent was awarded the 2018 Jan Michalski Prize for Literature, the 2018 Prix Transfuge for Meilleur roman européen and the 2019 Prix Laure Bataillon. It was also a finalist in the second selection for the 2018 Prix Femina étranger.

Jennifer Croft's English translation was shortlisted for the 2022 International Booker Prize.

== Audiobook ==
In 2020, an audiobook adaptation was released by Wydawnictwo Literackie (ISBN 978-83-08-06994-3). It has a runtime of 40 hours and 44 minutes. The novel's seven books are narrated by seven Polish actors and actresses: Danuta Stenka, Wiktor Zborowski, Jan Peszek, Agata Kulesza, Maja Ostaszewska, Adam Ferency and Mariusz Bonaszewski.
