= Allyssa McCabe =

Developmental psychologist

- Occupations: Scientist, educator

Academic background
- Education: Oberlin College; University of Virginia

Academic work
- Discipline: Developmental Psychology
- Sub-discipline: Narrative development
- Institutions: University of Massachusetts Lowell

Allyssa K. McCabe is a psychological scientist known for her work on narrative development. She is Professor Emerita of Psychology in the College of Fine Arts, Humanities and Social Sciences at the University of Massachusetts, Lowell, and affiliated with the Center for Autism Research & Education (CARE).

== Education ==
McCabe received her A.B. in Psychology and English at Oberlin College in 1974. She attended graduate school at University of Virginia (UVA) where she obtained her Masters of Arts (1977) and PhD in psychology (1980) under the supervision of James Deese. Her dissertation entitled A Rhetoric of Metaphor: Similarity, Goodness, Memory, and Interpretation explored the idea that people's above-average memory for metaphors comes from their metaphoric structure, rather than on the quality of the metaphor itself. As an undergraduate student, McCabe began conducting research on children's narratives in collaboration with Carole Peterson. Their collaborative work has been supported by grants from the Natural Sciences and Engineering Research Council of Canada and the Department of Secretary of State of Canada.

== Career ==
After graduating from UVA, McCabe was hired as an assistant professor at Wheaton College where she worked until 1984. During this time she focused her work on metaphor, causal and temporal connectives, and narrative structure and development. McCabe was an assistant professor at Southeastern Louisiana University from 1984 to 1986, where she studied causal and sentential connectives, narrative development, conduct disorder and verbal aggression. She subsequently moved to Tufts University and the Harvard Graduate School of Education where she worked until 1993. Her work at this time focused on narrative structure and development, parental elicitation and influence on narrative, preschool narrative skill-building, causal connectives, and cultural and language differences and preventing misdiagnoses of language deficits based on culture or language, particularly among Japanese, African-American, and Latino children. McCabe joined the faculty of UML in 1993, where she worked her way up from associate professor to professor emerita. She established a doctoral program in Applied Psychology and Prevention Science in the Psychology Department at UML. The first cohort of doctoral students matriculated in 2016. UML awarded her the Psychology Department Excellence in Teaching Award in 2012.

=== Editorial Work ===
McCabe is the founder and editor of Narrative Inquiry, which began publication in 1991 under the name Journal of Narrative and Life History. She has served on the editorial board of Imagination, Cognition and Personality since 2000.

=== Awards and accolades ===
In 1999, McCabe received the Editor's Award from Contemporary Issues in Communication Science and Disorders at the Annual Convention for the American Speech-Language-Hearing Association for her work with Lynn S. Bliss and Zenara Covington on the narratives of African American children.

McCabe and colleagues' 2014 social policy report on best practices for parents and caregivers and recommendations for policies impacting multilingual children, published by the Society for Research in Child Development, was endorsed by the American Academy of Pediatrics.

The Atlantic has interviewed McCabe as an expert on child language development, most recently calling on her expertise to guide parents in quarantine.

=== Community Outreach ===
McCabe has worked and volunteered to better the lives of the children of Lowell, Massachusetts particularly through their language exposure, acquisition, and development. Since 2000, McCabe has participated in the PEN New England literacy outreach to homeless children, with particular focus on the House of Hope in Lowell. In 2006, she was elected to the board of the Acre Family Child Center. In 2011, McCabe and Khanh Dinh collaborated with Lowell High School to explore how personal narratives help Latino and Asian adolescents explore their identity and familial ties. In 2016, McCabe joined MinJeong Kim and Phitsamay Sychitkokhong in their efforts to bring southeast Asian folktales to the children of Lowell, Massachusetts, which has a large Cambodian population, through the assistance of the "creative economy" grant from the UMass president's office. In 2019, the team released "A Long, Long Time Ago in Southeast Asia: Tales from Burma, Cambodia, Laos, and Vietnam," an illustrated, multilingual book of folk tales to be distributed to Lowell elementary schools.

== Research ==
McCabe has researched narrative development from early childhood throughout the lifespan, the role of parents in a child's narrative development, how narration differs across cultures and languages, and the ways in which narrative, phonological awareness, and vocabulary interact with each other. She is perhaps most famous for her work with preschool-age children, working on interventions to encourage their narratives both at home and in school.

McCabe, in collaboration with David Dickinson, developed the comprehensive language approach, "which looks at ways that the various strands of oral and written language (e.g., vocabulary, phonological awareness, print knowledge) affect each other in the acquisition of full literacy". This is in contrast to the phonological sensitivity approach which posits that oral language comes first and creates the environment in which a child can gain phonological sensitivity (a language skill). McCabe and colleagues use the comprehensive language approach to recommend that preschools emphasize vocabulary development and other language skills not as prerequisites to phonological sensitivity, but as important pieces in their own right for a child's reading capabilities.

In her work on multilingual and multicultural children's development, she has worked with a diverse range of cultural and language groups. Her first foray into non-English-speaking children's narratives was with her graduate student, Mashahiko Minami; together they explored Japanese children's narratives and the role of haikus. Later, with Lynn S. Bliss and Tempii Champion, she began to study African-American and Haitian American children's narratives. During this time, she also became interested in creating culturally sensitive assessments of children's language skills, with particular emphasis on reducing culturally-based misdiagnoses of deficits. Also with Lynn S. Bliss, McCabe studied narratives of Spanish-speaking children. With Khahn Dinh and Jana Sladkova, McCabe has studied Latino and Cambodian immigrant children's narratives. With Chien-ju Chang, she has recently explored Mandarin-speaking children's narratives. Her recent book, "Chinese Language Narration: Culture, cognition, and emotion" with Chien-ju Chang has received acclaim from fellow researchers. Shu-hui Eileen Chen writes that the book "represents one of the few recent works that provides an in-depth study of Chinese language narration" (p. 95).

== Books ==
- McCabe, A., & Chang, C. (Eds.). (2013). Chinese-language narration: Culture, cognition, and emotion. John Benjamins Publishing Company.
- McCabe, A., & Peterson, C. (Eds.). (1991). Developing narrative structure. Lawrence Erlbaum Associates.
- Peterson, C., & McCabe, A. (1983). Developmental psycholinguistics: Three ways of looking at a child's narrative. Plenum Press.
