= Noritoshi =

- Gender: Male

Origin
- Origin: Japanese
- Meaning: Different meanings depending on the kanji used

Noritoshi (written: 倫敏, 祝稔, 典俊, 紀年 or 憲寿) is a masculine Japanese given name. Notable people with the name include:

- Noritoshi Furuichi (古市 憲寿; born 1985), Japanese sociologist
- Noritoshi Hirakawa (平川 典俊; born 1960), Japanese photographer
- Noritoshi Hirata (平田 倫敏; born 1958), Japanese gymnast
- Noritoshi Ishida (石田 祝稔; born 1951), Japanese politician
- Noritoshi Kanai (金井 紀年; 1923–2017), Japanese businessman
