= The Blue Bedspread =

1999 novel by Raj Kamal Jha

- 1999 Picador ed.
- Author: Raj Kamal Jha
- Publication date: 1999
- ISBN: 9780330373852

The Blue Bedspread is the 1999 first novel by Indian writer Raj Kamal Jha.

In the novel an old man sits up all night in Calcutta writing for his dead older sister's newborn child, who is sleeping in the next room and will be taken the next day by adoptive parents. He says "I will tell you happy stories and I will tell you sad stories. And remember, my child, your truth lies somewhere in between". The book has been described as "the most tender, sensuous and beguiling book about incest and child abuse you'll ever read".

A 2007 paper by Alex Barley in Narrative Inquiry used this novel and Anita Desai's Fire on the Mountain to consider "the idea of home as a space of sanctuary and retreat from the problems of domestic life".

== Reception ==
In 2022 The Blue Bedspread was selected as one of the 70 titles for the Big Jubilee Read, a celebration of Commonwealth writing for the Platinum Jubilee of Elizabeth II.
