= Newsmakers Achievers Award =

- Country: India
- Presented by: Afternoon Voice
- First award: 2009
- Website: nbcaward.in

Newsmakers Achievers Award (also known as NBC Award) is an Indian honor for recognizing and applauding citizens' efforts and devotion in a variety of fields, including healthcare, business, education, social action, and unity. Vaidehi Taman founded NAA in 2009, and Afternoon Voice, a daily National newspaper with Maharashtrian roots, organizes it yearly.

== 2023 Awardees ==
15th Newsmakers Achievers Award held in Maharashtra.

- Syed Imtiyaz Jaleel

== 2022 Awardees ==
14th Newsmakers Achievers Award held in Maharashtra.

- Dr Prabha Atre
- Shri Sharad Govindrao Pawar
- Shri Ved Pratap Vaidik
- Shri Riteshwar Ji Maharaj
- Nadira Babbar
- Tirath Singh Rawat
- Kishori Pednekar
- Manjul (cartoonist)
- Bharatiya Digital Party
- Shreya Bugade

== 2021 Awardees ==
13th edition of Newsmakers Achievers Award ceremony took place in 2021 and were felicitated by Governor of Maharashtra at Raj Bhavan, Mumbai

- Devendra Fadnavis
- Neelam Gorhe
- Iqbal Singh Chahal
- Vithal Kamat
- Manoj Bajpayee
- Sandip Soparrkar
- Chetan Shashital

== 2019 Awardees ==
10th edition of Newsmakers Achievers Award ceremony took place in 2019.

- Navya Singh
- Asha Bhosle
- Moushumi Chatterjee
- Raj Kaushal
- Kamaal R. Khan
- Rajesh Shringarpure
- Geeta Kapoor
- Kiku Sharda
- Salil Acharya

== 2018 Awardees ==
The 9th edition of Newsmakers Achievers Award ceremony took place in 2018 in Mumbai

- Bappi Lahiri
- Rohit Roy
- Makarand Deshpande
- Kailash Kher
- Bharti Singh
- Suhani Dhanki

== 2017 Awardees ==
The 8th edition of Newsmakers Achievers Award event was held in May 2017 at Rangswar Hall Yashwantrao Chavan Centre, Mumbai.

- Vira Sathidar
- Vicky Nanjappa
- Ssumier Pasricha

== 2016 Awardees ==
The 7th edition of Newsmakers Achievers Award event was held in May 2016 at Police Gymkhana, Marine Drive, Mumbai. 7th Newsmakers Achievers Award dedicated to farmers.

- Sandip Soparrkar

== 2015 Awardees ==
- Rohit Verma
- Neeraj Kabi
- Sai Tamhankar
- Sudhir Mungantiwar

== 2014 Awardees ==
- Rinku Ghosh

== 2013 Awardees ==
- Delnaaz Irani

== 2011 Awardees ==
- Siddharth Kannan

== 2010 Awardees ==
This event was hosted at Taj Mahal Palace, Mumbai.

- Raj Thackeray
- Pankaj Bhujbal
- Pankaja Munde
- Smita Thackeray
- Prakash Javadekar (best spokesperson)
- Sachin Ahir (best Union leader)
- Jagannathrao Hegde (best Mumbai Sheriff)
- Rajdeep Sardesai
