= Raj Kamal Jha =

Indian writer, newspaper editor

- Born: 1966 (age 59–60)
- Occupations: Editor, journalist, novelist
- Writing career
- Language: English
- Notable works: The Blue Bedspread; If You Are Afraid of Heights; Fireproof; She Will Build Him a City; The City and the Sea; The Patient in Bed Number 12
- Notable awards: Commonwealth Writers' Prize; International Press Institute Award; Tata Literature Live! Best Book; Rabindranath Tagore Literary Prize; IAA Editor of the Year; Mumbai Red Ink Journalist of the Year; IIT Kharagpur Distinguished Alumnus Award; Ruskin Bond Award for Fiction

Raj Kamal Jha (born 1966) is an Indian newspaper editor and novelist writing in English. He currently serves as the Editor-in-Chief of The Indian Express. He has written six novels that have been translated into more than 12 languages. His journalism and fiction have won national and international awards, including the Commonwealth Writers Prize; Rabindranath Tagore Literary Prize; Tata Literature Live! Book of The Year; the International Press Institute India Award for Excellence in Journalism; and the Mumbai Press Club Journalist of the Year award. In September 2021, Jha was awarded Editor of The Year by the India Chapter of the International Advertising Association Annual Leadership Awards.

== Early life and education ==
Jha was born in Bhagalpur, Bihar, and grew up in Calcutta, West Bengal, where he went to school at St. Joseph's College. He attended the Indian Institute of Technology, Kharagpur, where he got his Bachelor of Technology with Honours in Mechanical Engineering. He was the editor of the campus magazine Alankar in his third (junior) and fourth (senior) years at IIT where he received the institute's Order of Merit. After graduating in June 1988, he received a full scholarship to the Graduate School of Journalism at the University of Southern California to pursue a Master's program in Print Journalism; he received his M.A. in 1990.

== Journalism ==
Since 1990, Jha has been working full-time in newsrooms. He was an Assistant Editor (News) at The Statesman in Kolkata between 1992 and 1994, a Senior Associate Editor at India Today, New Delhi (1994–1996), and since 1996 has been with The Indian Express, first as its Deputy Editor, then as Executive Editor, Managing Editor, Editor and now Chief Editor since June 2014. The newspaper and its journalists have won the Excellence in Journalism Award from the India chapter of the Vienna-based International Press Institute five times. These are for investigative work by the newspaper related to the Gujarat riots of 2002 and their aftermath; the Bihar flood scam in which relief was siphoned off by officers; the disappearance of tigers from India's national parks and questions regarding the role of the Election Commission of India.

As a member of the "International Consortium of Investigative Journalists", the newspaper, in April 2016, investigated The Panama Papers and revealed details of Indian names and companies related to offshore accounts in tax havens. Following the revelations, the Government set up a panel to probe each account. For the Panama Papers, the ICIJ won the Pulitzer Prize for Explanatory Reporting. For his "exemplary stewardship" of The Indian Express that saw a "focus on investigative journalism", Jha was named Journalist of the Year by the Mumbai Press Club at Redink Awards, 2017.

In June 2021, the newspaper's investigation of FinCEN files, tracking global dirty money flows through global banks including HSBC, JP Morgan Chase and Standard Chartered, was part of the ICIJ-BuzzFeedNews project that was a finalist for the Pulitzer Prize.

Delivering the vote of thanks at the Ramnath Goenka Memorial Awards in 2016 in the presence of Prime Minister Narendra Modi, Jha underlined that questioning those in power and holding them accountable, inviting their criticism, was the hallmark of good journalism, an obvious truth that often gets lost in the "selfie journalism" of "likes and retweets". The next year, Jha said that the only counter to fear in the newsroom was to get up and switch the lights on rather than find a safe blanket to hide under.

In 2017, for his "outstanding contribution" to journalism and literature by telling stories about a changing India with "honesty, compassion and courage", Jha was awarded the Distinguished Alumnus Award by his alma mater Indian Institute of Technology, Kharagpur, at its annual convocation. Past recipients of this award from the institute include Google's Sundar Pichai, Delhi Chief Minister Arvind Kejriwal and Magsaysay Award winner Harish Hande.

In March 2023, speaking at the RNG Awards in the presence of the Chief Justice of India Dhananjaya Y. Chandrachud, Jha called the Supreme Court the North Star for journalists for expanding the freedom of the press over the years. That's why, he said, "when the lights dim, when a reporter is arrested under a law meant for terrorists, when another is arrested for asking a question, when a university teacher is picked up for sharing a cartoon, a college student for a speech, a film star for a comment, or when a rejoinder to a story comes in the form of a police FIR – we turn to the North Star for its guiding light."

The Indian Express, both print and online, has monthly investigations—an opinion and ideas section, that showcases writers from across the political spectrum—and a national network of reporters and editors whose reporting help readers understand India.

== Novels ==
Jha's journalism uniquely shapes his fiction.

His sixth and latest novel The Patient in Bed Number 12, published in 2023, tracks a viral hate video, a dying father in search of the living and a daughter who follows her head and heart. Actor and director Nandita Das called it "a heart-wrenching journey through the lives of ordinary people in extraordinary times". Poet and critic Ranjit Hoskote wrote this "dazzling kaleidoscope" of a novel is a "superbly Sebaldian" take on the trauma and horror of a people who have lost agency.

His fifth novel The City And The Sea, published by Penguin Hamish Hamilton in 2019, "cleaves open India's tragedy of violence against women with a powerful story about our complicity in the culture that supports it." Nobel Laureate, economist and philosopher Amartya Sen has called it a "gripping narrative of human predicament and surviving hope, yielding an extraordinary combination of philosophy and allegory. A book you have to read."

Taking off from the 2012 Delhi gang rape, the novel "builds a narrative around a life disrupted by such an incident by delving into the past of one of the perpetrators (the juvenile), and the victim's impossible future (as a mother)." Writing in The Indian Express, eminent Malayalam writer N S Madhavan said: The layers upon layers of Jha's novel dress the "collective wound" of a nation.

His fourth novel She Will Build Him A City was published by Bloomsbury in India, Australia, UK and US and by Actes Sud in French. Pankaj Mishra has called it the "best novel from and about India I have read in a long time." Writer Neel Mukherjee has said its "revelations about the New India are explosive." Describing its writing as "gorgeous", Kirkus Reviews says it uses "magic to illuminate violence, poverty and loss" and shines light on the "ugly highs and lows of modern India". Writer and critic Alex Clark writes in The Guardian: "Everywhere, scale is out of whack: tiny dwellings are dwarfed by teetering towers; choked roads are closed by massing protesters and water cannons; spiralling sums of money are set against almost unfathomable deprivation. The sense throughout is of inescapable oppression. No wonder the characters – both human and animal – occasionally break the bonds of earth and fly across the sky in search of less constrained lives."

In April 2022, to mark the Platinum Jubilee of Queen Elizabeth II, the UK-based The Reading Agency and BBC Arts chose 70 titles, 10 books for each decade of the Queen's Reign that showcase "brilliant, beautiful and thrilling writing" from "inspiring writers" across the Commonwealth. The Blue Bedspread, by Jha, was chosen as one of the ten books for 1992-2001 along with works by Nobel Laureates Abdulrazak Gurnah and J. M. Coetzee; Arundhati Roy, Yann Martel, Zadie Smith, Michael Ondaatje, Rohinton Mistry, Carol Shields and Earl Lovelace.

Jha is represented by London-based literary agent David Godwin of David Godwin Associates.

=== Themes in Writing ===
His writing calls for reader participation which evokes sharp, divided reaction.

"Not everyone's kind of tales, they are dense and surreal, contain dark, brooding, even repugnant elements," said OPEN (magazine).

Writing on "The Patient in Bed Number 12," scholar and translator Arshia Sattar said: "Jha is a grammarian of our time parsing the news in his novels. His fiction transforms the news from something that fades into the past and is forgotten into a hologram of the present. More power to him and others like him—we need to see the truth even if we decide not to carry its weight.".

Reviewing "The City And The Sea," Malayalam writer K. R. Meera wrote: "It is the story of children within us, whose only defence against the unexplained horrors of the dark is darkness itself." Actor and activist Shabana Azmi said reading the book is "to dive into the darkness and spot a piercing ray of light". That as India stumbles its way into the 21st century, its "absolute priority has to be the safety of girls in public and private places and this will need courage and compassion".

John Fowles described The Blue Bedspread as the "Coming of age of the Indian novel." On Jha's second novel "If You Are Afraid of Heights," Alfred Hickling wrote in The Guardian: "Readers are left to formulate their own theories and connections. But Jha's writing functions more through power of association than sequential narrative. His prose has the febrile, cold-sweat quality of the most vivid waking nightmares. He suspends his work in a realm of improbability, where it is possible to think the unthinkable...Perhaps the biggest taboo that Jha seeks to breach is the sacrosanct, hierarchical structure of the family." According to writer and musician Amit Chaudhuri, Jha's writing is more in the tradition of cinema than literature. Referring to the works of Tarkovsky, Luis Buñuel and Pedro Almodóvar, Chaudhuri says just like their films are "destined to be foreign even to those who speak the language they are made in", Jha's novel speaks a "foreign language".

Fireproof is set against the backdrop of the 2002 Gujarat riots, the first attack on Muslims (In retaliation of attacks on Karsevaks in Godhra) after 9/11. The novel is a chilling tale of a father and his deformed son on a journey across a city where the ghosts of those killed have decided to seek justice. Commenting on Fireproof, India Today said: "Here is a chronicle for the 21st century, then, a bildungsroman that tracks the education of the crime-infested soul, completed when the soul cries 'I am guilty.'"

Reviewing Jha's fourth novel, "She Will Build Him A City," The Saturday Paper, the Australian cultural weekly, called it "conceptually daring and important beyond entertainment". The importance of the novel, it wrote, is the fact that "if the Indian economy is a tiger on the verge of roaring, the world should hear the stories of the people who have fed it with their blood."

== Honours ==
- Winner, Commonwealth Writers Prize for Best First Book (Eurasia), The Blue Bedspread, 2000
- Finalist, John Llewellyn Rhys Prize, The Blue Bedspread, 2000
- Finalist, Guardian First Book Award, The Blue Bedspread, 1999
- The New York Times Notable Book of The Year, The Blue Bedspread, 2000
- Finalist, Hutch-Crossword Book Award, If You Are Afraid of Heights, 2003
- Winner, Best Book (Fiction) published in 2006, Fireproof, CNN-IBN List
- Finalist, DSC Prize for South Asian Literature, She Will Build Him A City, 2016
- Longlist, JCB Prize for Literature, The City and The Sea, 2019
- Finalist, DSC Prize for South Asian Literature, The City and the Sea, 2019
- Winner, Tata Literature Live Book of The Year (Fiction), The City and the Sea, 2019
- Finalist, Mathrubhumi Book of the Year, The City and the Sea, 2020
- Winner, Rabindranath Tagore Literary Prize, The City and the Sea, 2020
- Selected, The Blue Bedspread, as one of the 10 books of decade 1992-2001 and one of the 70 books to mark The Queen's Jubilee List, 2022
- Winner, Ruskin Bond Award for Fiction, Banaras Literature Festival, The Patient in Bed Number 12, 2025

== Other media ==
Japanese video artist and photographer Noritoshi Hirakawa created four video art installations taking scenes from Jha's three novels for an exhibition at the National Gallery of Modern Art in New Delhi in 2007 as part of a special exhibition of contemporary Japanese art called Vanishing Points.

== Teaching ==
Jha was a visiting professor at the Graduate School of Journalism at the University of California, Berkeley where he taught a course on reporting on India. He was also a fellow at the Yaddo Residency in Saratoga Springs, New York, in 2005. He was selected as Artist-in-Residence (Literature) in Berlin by the German Academic Exchange Service for 2012–2013 under the Berliner Künstlerprogramm, offering grants to artists in the fields of "visual arts, literature, music and film."

== Books ==
- 1999: The Blue Bedspread, novel, Picador, Random House
- 2003: If You Are Afraid of Heights, novel, Picador, Harcourt
- 2006: Zwischen den Welten, Short fiction in a German anthology
- 2006-7: Fireproof, novel, Picador
- 2012: Prose-verse in Kindness, Australia-India Cultural Exchange, 20 Year Anniversary Project, Australia-India Council
- 2013: Short Fiction in Es war einmal, audio book, Hörbuch Hamburg
- 2015: She Will Build Him A City, novel, Bloomsbury
- 2019: The City And The Sea, novel, Penguin Hamish Hamilton
- 2023: The Patient in Bed Number 12, novel, Penguin Hamish Hamilton

== See also ==
- Indian writing in English
- List of Indian writers
