= Star Hotel =

Star Hotel may refer to:

- Star Hotel, Balmain, a pub in Sydney, New South Wales, Australia
- Star Hotel, a pub in Newcastle, New South Wales, Australia, scene of the large Star Hotel riot
- Star Hotel, Great Yarmouth, Norfolk, England

== See also ==
- For "5-star", "4-star" etc. hotels, see hotel rating.
