= Kamat Hotels =

Indian hotel chain

Kamat Hotels (India) Ltd
- Type: Public
- Traded as: BSE: 526668; NSE: KAMATHOTEL
- ISIN: INE967C01018
- Industry: Hospitality
- Founded: Mumbai, India (1986)
- Founder: Late Mr. Venkatesh Krishna Kamat
- Headquarters: Mumbai, India
- Key people: Vithal V. Kamat (Executive Chairman & Managing Director); Vishal V. Kamat (CEO – Fort Jadhavgadh)
- Products: Hotels and resorts
- Revenue: ₹168.52 crore (US$18 million) (2017)
- Website: www.khil.com

Kamat Hotels (India) Ltd is a chain of luxury hotels and hospitality in India. It was founded in 1986 by Late Mr. Venkatesh Krishna Kamat and has since grown to over 4000 hotels in 8 cities in India. as well as around the globeI

, The Orchid Hotel – Ecotel, Mumbai, was the first to receive the Ecotel certification.

Kamat Hotels unit "Lotus Resorts" at Konark, Odisha is affected by Fani Cyclone. Due to this, the company announced a strike under Regulation 30 (LODR).

== History ==
Satkar Restaurant opposite Churchgate Station at Mumbai was the first Restaurant started in 1958. The success of Satkar Restaurant and increasing demand for fast-food prompted the group to launch Samrat Restaurant at Churchgate in 1972.

The company Kamat Hotels (India) Ltd. was incorporated on 21 March 1986 in Mumbai by Late Mr. Venkatesh Krishna Kamat. The group built a three Star Hotel with 32 rooms in the first phase with provision for another 80 rooms at Silvassa.

In 1990 the company owned Plaza Hotels Private Limited located near Santacruz Airport, Mumbai. Later it became a 4-star property named THE KAMAT PLAZA designed by an International Designer Lynn Wilson from USA.

The Kamat Group launched its first five-star hotel The Orchid Hotels in Mumbai. It was partially opened to the public on 27 September 1997, with 221 rooms and 12 suites. The Orchid is an Ecotel Hotel, Asia's first chain of 5 stars. The Ecotel certificate is awarded by HVS Global Hospitality Services, USA. The Orchid Hotels are located in Mumbai, Pune and Bhubaneswar.

In the year 2004, the company founded "Kamfotel" hotel in Nashik.

In 1994, the company made its Initial Public Issue of Equity shares of Rs.10 was issued at a premium of Rs.50. The NCD Issue of the Company was rated "A" by CRISIL. The above rating was retained by CRISIL till the NCDs were redeemed in 2001.

In 1995, the company founded a hotel management school "Kamat's Institute of Hotel Management", and "Kamats Tours & Travels" in Mumbai.

Kamat Hotels having the trademark of The Orchid Hotels as it wins trademark case against Royal Orchid Hotels in December 2017.
