= Khel Paheliyon Ka =

Interactive quiz show

- Genre: Game show
- Created by: Indian Storytellers
- Written by: Charul Prabhakar
- Directed by: Manu Prakash Singh
- Starring: Ssumier Pasricha
- Country of origin: India
- Original language: Hindi
- No. of seasons: 1

Production
- Running time: ko
- Production company: Indian Storytellers

Original release
- Release: 2 June – 3 June 2021

Khel Paheliyon Ka is an Indian interactive quiz show currently hosted by Ssumier Pasricha, known for his character 'Pammi Aunty'. It is an original series of Flipkart Video directed by Manu Prakash Singh and produced under the banner of Indian Storytellers. The concept is devised by Charul Prabhakar. The show was launched on Flipkart app on 2 June 2021.

== Overview ==
Khel Paheliyon Ka is a daily game show where home viewers are the contestants. Each episode will be 4–6 minutes in length and feature three riddles that the viewers have to solve with the help of clues and hints provided by the host. The show will cover themes ranging from fashion, sports, music, Bollywood to famous personalities. In every question, the viewers will see the answer in a form of Anagram. The viewers have to crack the clues within 30 seconds and rearrange the alphabets to submit the correct answer.

== Development ==
On 31 March 2021, Flipkart Video announced the release date as 2 June 2021 on its official Twitter. This was followed by a 36-second trailer featuring Prince Narula, which was unveiled on the YouTube channel.
