= Masahiko =

- Gender: Male

Origin
- Origin: Japanese
- Meaning: Different meanings depending on the kanji used

Masahiko (written: 正彦, 雅彦, 誠彦, 昌彦, 允彦, 政彦, 真彦, 正比古 or まさ彦) is a masculine Japanese given name. Notable people with the name include:

- Masahiko Amakasu (甘粕 正彦; 1891–1945), an officer in the Imperial Japanese Army imprisoned for his involvement in the Amakasu Incident
- Masahiko Fujiwara (藤原 正彦; born 1943), a Japanese mathematician best known as an essayist
- Masahiko Harada (原田 雅彦; born 1968), a Japanese ski jumper
- Masahiko Ichikawa (市川 雅彦; born 1985), a Japanese footballer
- Masahiko Inoha (伊野波 雅彦; born 1985), a Japanese football player
- Masahiko Kōmura (高村 正彦; born 1942), a Japanese politician of the Liberal Democratic Party
- Masahiko Katsuya (勝谷 誠彦; 1960–2018), a Japanese columnist, photographer, and pundit
- Masahiko Kimura (木村 政彦; 1917–1993), a Japanese judoka (Judo practitioner)
- Masahiko Kimura (bonsai artist) (木村 正彦; born 1940), a bonsai master
- Masahiko Kobe (神戸 勝彦; 1969–2019), a chef specializing in Italian cuisine
- Masahiko Kondō (近藤 真彦; born 1964), or Matchy is a Japanese singer, lyricist and actor
- Masahiko Kumagai (熊谷 雅彦; born 1975), a Japanese former football player
- Masahiko Minami (南 雅彦; born 1961), a Japanese anime producer and president of Bones
- Masahiko Minami (academic) (南 雅彦), a linguistics professor at San Francisco State University
- Masahiko Morifuku (森福 允彦; born 1986), Japanese baseball player
- Masahiko Morita (森田 雅彦), a Japanese Magic: The Gathering player
- Masahiko Nagasawa (長澤 雅彦; born 1965), a Japanese film director
- Masahiko Nakagawa (中河 昌彦; born 1969), a former Japanese football player
- Masahiko Nishimura (西村 まさ彦; born 1960), a Japanese theatre and film actor
- Masahiko Nomi (能見 正比古; 1925–1981), a Japanese journalist who advocated Takeji Furukawa's idea
- Masahiko Shibayama (柴山 昌彦; born 1965), a Japanese politician of the Liberal Democratic Party
- Masahiko Shimada (島田 雅彦; born 1961), a Japanese writer
- Masahiko Suzuki (鈴木 真彦; born 1997), Japanese kickboxer
- Masahiko Takeshita (竹下 正彦), the head of the domestic affairs section of the Military Affairs Bureau of the Imperial Japanese Army during World War II
- Masahiko Tanaka (田中 正彦; born 1954), Japanese voice actor
- Masahiko Togashi (富樫 雅彦; 1940–2007), Japanese jazz percussionist and composer
- Masahiko Toyoyama (豊山 昌彦; born 1976), Japanese rugby union player
- Masahiko Tsugawa (津川 雅彦; 1940—2018), a Japanese actor and director
- Masahiko Urano (浦野 真彦; born 1964), Japanese shogi player
- Masahiko Yamada (山田 正彦; born 1942), a Japanese politician of the Democratic Party of Japan
- Masahiko Yamamoto (山本 雅彦; born 1956), Japanese speed skater
- Yuuki Masahiko (結城 雅彦; born 1975), a Japanese guitarist
