= Ryszard Kapuściński Award =

Polish international literary prize

- Awarded for: best reportage books
- Country: Poland
- Presented by: Council of the Capital City of Warsaw
- Reward: PLN 100,000 (ca. $25,000)
- First award: 2010

The Ryszard Kapuściński Award (Polish: Nagroda im. Ryszarda Kapuścińskiego) is a major annual Polish international literary prize, the most important distinction in the genre of literary reportage.

== History ==
The award was founded to celebrate and promote most worthwhile reportage books which touch on important contemporary issues, evoke reflection, and deepen knowledge of the world of other cultures, and thus also about oneself. Intended to honour the legacy of the journalist and writer Ryszard Kapuściński (1932–2007), the award cherishes the honorary patronage of Mrs Alicja Kapuścińska, the wife of the writer.

Established in January 2010 by the Council of the Capital City of Warsaw, the award takes form of a monetary prize: 100,000 złoty for the author of the best literary reportage of the year and 20,000 PLN to the author of the best translation of the reportage of the year. Past members of the jury have included figures such as Joanna Bator, Maciej Drygas, Olga Stanisławska, Maciej Zaremba, Małgorzata Szejnert, Anders Bodegård, Julia Fiedorczuk, William R. Brand and Piotr Mitzner.

The award should not be confused with two other awards named after Ryszard Kapuściński: the Polish Press Agency Ryszard Kapuściński Award established in 2010 and the Ryszard Kapuściński Translation Award established in 2015.

== Winners ==
Year	Laureate(s)	Image	Citizenship(s)	Title	Award for translation	Citation(s)	Ref.
2026	Peter Pomerantsev	Peter Pomerantsev	United Kingdom	How to Win an Information War: The Propagandist Who Outwitted Hitler	Aleksandra Paszkowska	for the translation of Peter Pomerantsev's How to Win an Information War: The Propagandist Who Outwitted Hitler	
2025	Andrzej Dybczak	–	Poland	The Forest of Ghosts (Las duchów)	–	–	
2024	Fernanda Melchor	Fernanda Melchor	Mexico	This Is Not Miami (To nie jest Miami)	Tomasz Pindel	for the translation of Fernanda Melchor's This Is Not Miami	
2023	Anna Goc	–	Poland	Głusza	No award	–	
2022	Ander Izagirre	Ander Izagirre	Spain	The Mountain That Eats Men (Potosí. Góra, która zjada ludzi)	Jerzy Wołk-Łaniewski	for the translation of Ander Izagirre's The Mountain That Eats Men	
2021	Jessica Bruder	Jessica Bruder	United States	Nomadland	Martyna Tomczak	for the translation of Jessica Bruder's Nomadland	
2020	Katarzyna Kobylarczyk	Katarzyna Kobylarczyk	Poland	The Scab. Spain Scratches Open Its Wounds (Strup. Hiszpania rozdrapuje rany)	Irena Kowadło-Przedmojska, Tomasz Pindel and Marek S. Zadura (ex aequo)	for the translations of Lars Berg's Good Wolf. The Tragedy At A Swedish Zoo, Óscara Martínez's The Beast: About People No One Cares About and Artem Czech's Zero Point respectively	
2019	Maciej Zaremba	Maciej Zaremba	Sweden	A House with Two Turrets (Dom z dwiema wieżami)	Mariusz Kalinowski	for the translation of Maciej Zaremba's Huset med de två tornen (A House with Two Turrets) from Swedish	
2018	Anna Bikont	Anna Bikont	Poland	Sendler: In Hiding (Sendlerowa. W ukryciu)	Sergiusz Kowalski	for the translation of Ben Rawlence's City of Thorns: Nine Lives in the World's Largest Refugee Camp from English	
2017	Rana Dasgupta	Rana Dasgupta	United Kingdom	Capital: A Portrait of Delhi in the Twenty‑First Century	Barbara Kopeć-Umiastowska, Janusz Ochab and Marta Szafrańska-Brandt (ex aequo)	for the translations of Rana Dasgupta's Capital: A Portrait of Delhi in the Twenty‑First Century, Ed Vulliamy's The War is Dead, Long Live the War: Bosnia: The Reckoning and Martin Caparrós Hunger (El Hambre) respectively	
2016	Paweł Piotr Reszka	Piotr Reszka	Poland	The Devil and the Bar of Chocolate	No award	–	
2015	William Dalrymple	Svetlana Alexievich	Scotland	Return of a King	No award	–	
2014	Elisabeth Åsbrink	Elisabeth Åsbrink	Sweden	And in Wienerwald the Trees Are Still Standing (Och i Wienerwald står träden kvar)	Irena Kowadło-Przedmojska	for the translation of Elisabeth's Åsbrink's And in Wienerwald the Trees Are Still Standing	
2013	Ed Vulliamy	Ed Vuillamy	United Kingdom	Amexica: War Along the Borderline	Janusz Ochab	for the translation of Ed Vulliamy's Amexica: War Along the Borderline	
2012	Liao Yiwu	Liao Yiwu	China	The Corpse Walker: Real Life Stories, China from the Bottom Up	Wen Huang and Agnieszka Pokojska	for the Chinese-English translation of Liao Yiwu's The Corpse Walker: Real Life Stories, China from the Bottom Up	
2011	Svetlana Alexievich	Svetlana Alexievich	Belarus	War's Unwomanly Face	Jerzy Czech	for the Polish translation of Svetlana Alexievich's War's Unwomanly Face	
2010	Jean Hatzfeld	Jean Hatzfeld	France	The Antelope's Strategy: Living in Rwanda After the Genocide	Jacek Giszczak	for the Polish translation of Jean Hatzfeld's The Antelope's Strategy: Living in Rwanda After the Genocide	

== See also ==
- Angelus Award
- Zbigniew Herbert International Literary Award
- Polish literature
