= Tokyo Cancelled =

2005 novel by Rana Dasgupta

- First edition
- Author: Rana Dasgupta
- Language: English
- Genre: Travel Fiction
- Published: 2005
- Publisher: Fourth Estate
- Publication place: United Kingdom

Tokyo Cancelled is the debut novel by British Indian novelist Rana Dasgupta. The novel narrates the stories told by thirteen different passengers stranded in an airport, each telling a separate tale to pass the time. Tokyo Cancelled presents short stories tenuously linked together by their use of fairy-tale like narratives, with short interludes between the narratives which link the tales together. These tales, whilst having little-to-no interaction with each other, all present the overarching themes of modern globalization and metamorphosis, as well as links into the magic realism genre.

The novel was short-listed for the John Llewellyn Rhys Prize (UK) and the Hutch Crossword Book Award (India). One tale from the book was short-listed for the BBC National Short Story Prize.

== Plot Synopsis ==
The separate chapters in the novel, each one narrating a tale from a different passenger, are as follows:

=== Arrivals: Prologue ===
The flight to Tokyo is cancelled, thus the book's title, and the remaining airline passengers gather together to tell their tales.

=== The Tailor: The First Story ===
In an unidentified country, Prince Ibrahim visits a small rural town and comes across a tailor named Mustafa. Impressed with the tailor's work, the Prince requests that Mustafa make him a fine ceremonial robe and deliver it to the royal palace. Mustafa toils over the robe for several weeks, and when his work is done he travels to the capital city. Arriving at the royal palace, Mustafa is repeatedly denied entry due to not having any documentation. Having spent all of his money getting to the capital city, and steeped in debt from the costs of his labour, he begins living on the streets outside the royal palace and buries the robe in the desert.

Many years later, Mustafa spots Prince Ibrahim and desperately tries to approach him, yet despite his protests the Prince does not recognise him in his bedraggled form. One of the Prince's companions, Suleiman, who remembers the Prince requesting the robe, takes pity on the tailor and offers to buy the robe off Mustafa if he can bring it to him. Mustafa returns to the spot where he buried the robe but discovers that a local villager has sold it to a French museum and has used the millions of dollars it fetched to begin construction on the site.

Returning empty-handed, Suleiman doubts Mustafa's story and turns him away with just enough money to cover his stay in the capital. Later, during a massive festival attended by various corporations, Mustafa petitions to King Saïd and relays his story. Prince Ibrahim immediately dismisses the tailor's story, but the King gives Mustafa a chance to prove his honesty by telling a story in accordance with their culture's customs: by having thirteen layers of meaning. Mustafa recounts the story of a tailor who, having repeatedly failed to make clothing for a wedding, tells the groom that he must not be ready to wear the garments since they refused to be made.

Greatly moved by the tale, the King grants Mustafa one request in recompense for the misunderstanding. Mustafa requests money, since he feels he has sunk so low, so the King settles all of Mustafa's debts and the tailor leaves the city. Being disillusioned with city life but having too grand dreams to return to his small town, Mustafa moves to a seaside town where he makes a living crafting uniforms for soldiers, and every evening he tells his story to the boats that sail past in the distance.

=== The Memory Editor: The Second Story ===
Thomas, a young boy in London, finds work editing memories. Strangely, he finds his own memories affected as well.

=== The Billionaire's Sleep: The Third Story ===
Taking place in Delhi, this story tells of the Malhotra family's three god-like children, a tragedy that unfolds with nods to both the tale of Rapunzel and the Ramayana.

=== The House of the Frankfurt Mapmaker: The Fourth Story ===
Klaus, a German mapmaker, compiles all of the world's data in a unique map, but trouble comes when a strange mute named Deniz moves into his mansion.

=== The Store on Madison Avenue: The Fifth Story ===
Using Oreo cookies, Robert De Niro's bastard son transmutes his girlfriend into a high-end clothing store, stirring the attention of the Chinese mob.

=== The Flyover: The Sixth Story ===
Under a certain Mr. Bundu's obscure business network, based on the sales from a busy market under a flyover, Marlboro, a Nigerian resident, loses everything when the government walls up the market with him inside.

=== The Speed Bump: The Seventh Story ===
A Detroit teenager loses his life after a new speed bump is installed in his neighborhood. This chapter, the only one without any magical elements, can be seen as a "speed bump" for the novel itself.

=== The Doll: The Eight Story ===
Yukio Takizawa is in the business of alternative cleaning products. Under pressure from work and from family members that don't understand him, he creates and falls in love with a life-size doll on the verge of becoming real.

=== The Rendezvous in Istanbul: The Ninth Story ===
Two lovers, Natalia and Riad, have a romantic chance encounter in Istanbul. Briefly afterwards, Riad loses his voice and returns to work as a sailor. Much later, stranded at a port in Marseilles and on the brink of insanity, he births a bird from his throat that leads Natalia to his rescue.

=== The Changeling: The Tenth Story ===
In Paris, a changeling (a noncorpum living in a human body) named Bernard befriends an old wanderer named Fareed. After a rare type of flower begins growing inside his body, Fareed goes to France looking for a single word to help him pass from life to death easily. Despite an outbreak of smallpox and a city under lockdown, Bernard roams around searching for this word for his friend. Eventually Fareed dies, but only after Bernard has been tethered to his soul, causing him to die and lose his immortality as well.

=== The Bargain in the Dungeon: The Eleventh Story ===
Katya, the most recent addition to Magda's ambiguous dungeon of humiliation, experiences more than she bargained for when trying to have the baby of one mysterious client named K.

=== The Lucky Ear Cleaner: The Twelfth Story ===
Xiaosong, considered lucky all his life, moves his way up the ranks of the working class in Shenzhen until the fond memory of cleaning Yinfang's ear has him give it all up.

=== The Recycler of Dreams: The Thirteenth Story ===
The appropriately postmodern finale of the novel. This chapter self-referentially recalls past scenes from the other stories in the wild dream of Gustavo.

=== Departures: Epilogue ===
With some sense of reluctance, the thirteen story tellers make their way onto the flight as the reality of morning returns to the airport.

== The Number Thirteen ==
The number thirteen seems to carry some significance in the novel, as it is mentioned on several occasions:

First of all, there are thirteen passengers left in the airport, each with their own unique tale.

In "The Tailor," the elders of the king's court note that the tailor's story has all the thirteen levels of meaning.

In "The House of the Frankfurt Mapmaker," there is mention of thirteen dresses.

In "The Store on Madison Avenue," Chu Yu Tang has thirteen daughters.

In "The Rendevouz in Istanbul," Riad bets on the number thirteen while gambling at roulette for money to convince Natalia to sleep with him.

In "The Changeling," Fareed sings thirteen songs, one for each day of his time in the garden, and then dies.

In "The Recycler of Dreams," a chapter with thirteen sections, Gustavo records the dreams of his thirteen homeless boarders.

The number thirteen appears elsewhere, suggesting some importance of the number to the overall understanding of the novel.
