= Maciej Zaremba =

Swedish journalist and author (born 1951)

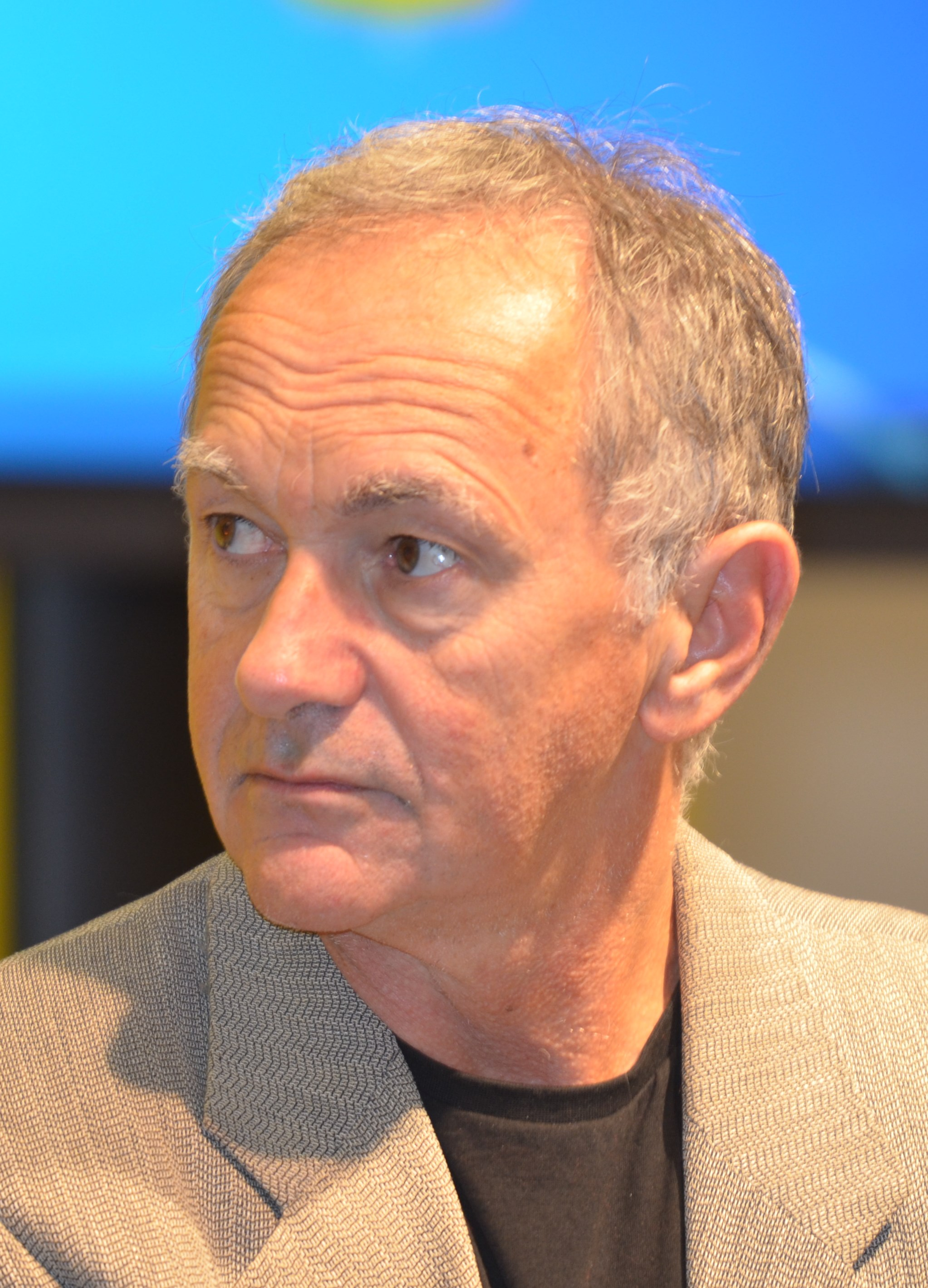
- Zaremba in 2013
- Born: 12 March 1951; Poznań, Poland
- Occupation: Journalist, writer
- Spouse: Agneta Pleijel (1988-present)

Maciej Zaremba Bielawski (born 12 March 1951) is a Swedish journalist and author.

Zaremba was born in Poznań, Poland, son to Oskar Bielawski and Elżbieta Immerdauer. In 1969 he emigrated to Sweden with his mother and two younger brothers due to increasing anti-semitism in Poland. He started working as a construction worker. In his youth, he was active in the League Communist (Swedish: Förbundet Kommunist), but abandoned his communist views when the group was dissolved in 1982. He earned a B.A. in the history of ideas from Stockholm University in 1988. He started writing for the newspaper Dagens Nyheter in 1989 and in 1994 he was recruited to the editorial team of the now defunct magazine Moderna tider.

In 1997, Zaremba became famous after he wrote a series of articles in Dagens Nyheter about the compulsory sterilization program active in Sweden from the mid-1930s until the mid-1970s. The article sparked much debate in Sweden and led to a government inquiry into the matter.

In 2005 he wrote a series of articles about a labor dispute involving foreign construction workers in Vaxholm. For these articles he was awarded the Stora Journalistpriset ("Great Journalist Award") and Hasse Olssons pris till årets ekonomijournalist ("Hasse Olsson's Award for Business Journalist of the Year") in 2006. In 2005 he also received Gösta Bohman-stipendiet ("Gösta Bohman Award) and a prize from the Swedish Academy through its own funds. In 2019, he was the recipient of the Ryszard Kapuściński Award for Huset med de två tornen (A House with Two Turrets).

Zaremba has been married since 1982 to the author Agneta Pleijel.

== Bibliography ==
- Zaremba, Maciej; Pieniowski, Håkan (1983). Rzeszów : bland polska bönder (in Swedish). Stockholm: Öppna ögon. ISBN 91-85906-15-8.
- Zaremba, Maciej; Bischofberger, Erwin (1985). Arbete före kapital : den katolska kyrkans sociallära (in Swedish). Stockholm: Brevskolan on commission from Sveriges Kristna Socialdemokraters Förbund. ISBN 91-574-1199-9.
- Zaremba, Maciej (1992). Minken i folkhemmet : [essäer] (in Swedish). Stockholm: Timbro. ISBN 91-7566-250-7.
- Zaremba, Maciej (1999). De rena och de andra : om tvångssteriliseringar, rashygien och arvsynd (in Swedish). Stockholm: Dagens Nyheter. ISBN 91-7588-328-7.
- Zaremba, Maciej (2000). Kyrkan & friheten : en debattbok om den fria Svenska kyrkans identitet och demokrati (in Swedish). Gothenburg: Cordia. ISBN 91-86082-88-4.
- Zaremba, Maciej (2006). Den polske rörmokaren och andra berättelser från Sverige (in Swedish). Stockholm: Norstedt. ISBN 91-1-301606-7.
