= Rabindranath Tagore Literary Prize =

Indian literary award

The Rabindranath Tagore Literary Prize
- Literary award
- Awarded for: Outstanding work by an Indian Author
- Sponsored by: Maitreya Publishing Foundation
- Rewards: USD 10,000 (2018-2019); USD 5,000 (2020)
- First award: 2018
- Final award: 2020
- Most recent winner: The City And The Sea, Raj Kamal Jha

Highlights
- First winner: One hundred poems of Kabir, Kabir
- Last winner: The City And The Sea, Raj Kamal Jha
- Website: tagoreprize.com

The Rabindranath Tagore Literary Prize is a literary honour in India conferred annually to published works of Indian authors (residing in India or abroad) in novel, short stories, poetry and drama, originally written in any of Indian official languages and dialects, but translated to English. It was founded in 2018 by US-based independent and non-profit publishing house Maitreya Publishing Foundation (MPF) as a platform for world peace, literature, art, education and human rights. The winners receive USD 10,000 as the prize money along with a Rabindranath Tagore statuette while the shortlisted authors each receive USD 500.

The 2019 Rabindranath Tagore Literary Prize in literature was awarded to Rana Dasgupta for the literary novel “Solo". Rabindranath Tagore Literary Prize 2019 for Social Achievement was awarded to Yohei Sasakawa, for his efforts to uproot leprosy and his great contribution to world peace, and to Madame President of Taiwan, Ms. Tsai Ing-Wen and Taiwanese people, as being a Beacon of Democracy, Human Rights and Freedom.

In 2020 Rabindranath Tagore Prize for Social Achievement was conferred to His Majesty Sultan Qaboos bin Said Al Said, the late Sultan of Oman and The People of Oman, for his lifelong efforts and legacy as a peacemaker, his Majesty’s velvety diplomatic mediation of complex domestic and world affairs resulting in successful peaceful resolutions and to the world-renowned dancer choreographer Sandip Soparrkar for his worldwide initiative 'Dance for a Cause' where he uses dance, music and drama to highlight various world social issues. Raj Kamal Jha was announced the winner of the Tagore Literary Prize for his novel – The City and the Sea. In 2020, it was announced that the prizes for 2021 and 2022 would be merged, due to disruptions caused by the COVID-19 pandemic.

== Winners and shortlisted authors ==
The winners and shortlisted authors of Rabindranath Tagore Literary Prize are.

Year	Author	Title
2018
2018	Kabir (translated to english by Rabindranath Tagore)	One Hundred Poems of Kabir (poetry)
2018	Vinita Agrawal	The Silk of Hunger (poetry)
2018	Maj. Gen. G.D. Bakshi	Dances with the Cranes (poetry)
2018	Tishani Doshi	Pleasure Seekers (novel)
2018	Amitav Ghosh	The Ibis Trilogy (Sea of Poppies, River of Smoke, Flood of Fire) (novels)
2018	Jhumpa Lahiri	Unaccustomed Earth (short stories)
2018	Anita Nair	The Lilac House (novel)
2018	Daya Pawar	Kondwada (poetry)
2018	Kiriti Sengupta	Healing Waters Floating Lamps (poetry)
2018	Amish Tripathi	Shiva Trilogy – (The Immortals of Meluha, The Secret of the Nagas, The Oath of the Vayuputras) (novels)
2019
2019	Rana Dasgupta	Solo (literary fiction)
2019	Amit Chaudhuri	The Immortals (literary fiction)
2019	K. Madavane	To Die in Benares (translated from the French language by Blake Smith, literary fiction (poetic prose/short stories))
2019	Jayanta Mahapatra	Hesitant Light (poetry)
2019	Neel Mukherjee	The Lives of Others (literary fiction)
2019	Manoj Pandey	The Legacy of Nothing (illustrations by Yuko Shimizu, literary fiction (poetic prose/ short stories))
2019	Kala Ramesh	Beyond the Horizon Beyond (haiku & haibun)
2019	Siddharth Dhanvant Shanghvi	The Lost Flamingoes of Bombay (literary fiction)
2019	Menka Shivdasani	Frazil (poetry)
2019	Jeet Thayil	The Book of Chocolate Saints (literary fiction)
2020
2020	Raj Kamal Jha	The City and the Sea (literary fiction)
2020	Amitav Ghosh	Gun Island literary (fiction)
2020	Nirmala Govindarajan	Taboo (literary fiction)
2020	Ranjit Hoskote	Jonahwhale (poetry)
2020	Sachin Kundalkar translated from Marathi into English by Jerry Pinto	Cobalt blue (literary fiction)
2020	Varun Thomas Mathew	The Black Dwarves of the Good Little Bay (literary fiction)
2020	Sonnet Mondal	Karmic Chant (poetry)
2020	Rochelle Potkar	Paper Asylum (haibun)
2020	Bijoya Sawian	Shadow Men (literary fiction)
2020	Sudeep Sen	EroText (literary fiction, experimental fiction)

== Tagore Prize for Social Achievements ==
It is awarded annually along with the literary award to recognise those who have made a positive and lasting impact on the society.

Tagore Prize for Social Achievements
Year	Awarded to
2018	Kailash Satyarthi Children’s Foundation
2019	Yohei Sasakawa and Ms. Tsai Ing-Wen and Taiwanese people
2020	His Majesty Sultan Qaboos bin Said Al Said and the People of Oman and Sandip Soparrkar a renowned Indian dancer choreographer
