= Małgorzata Szejnert =

Polish journalist and writer

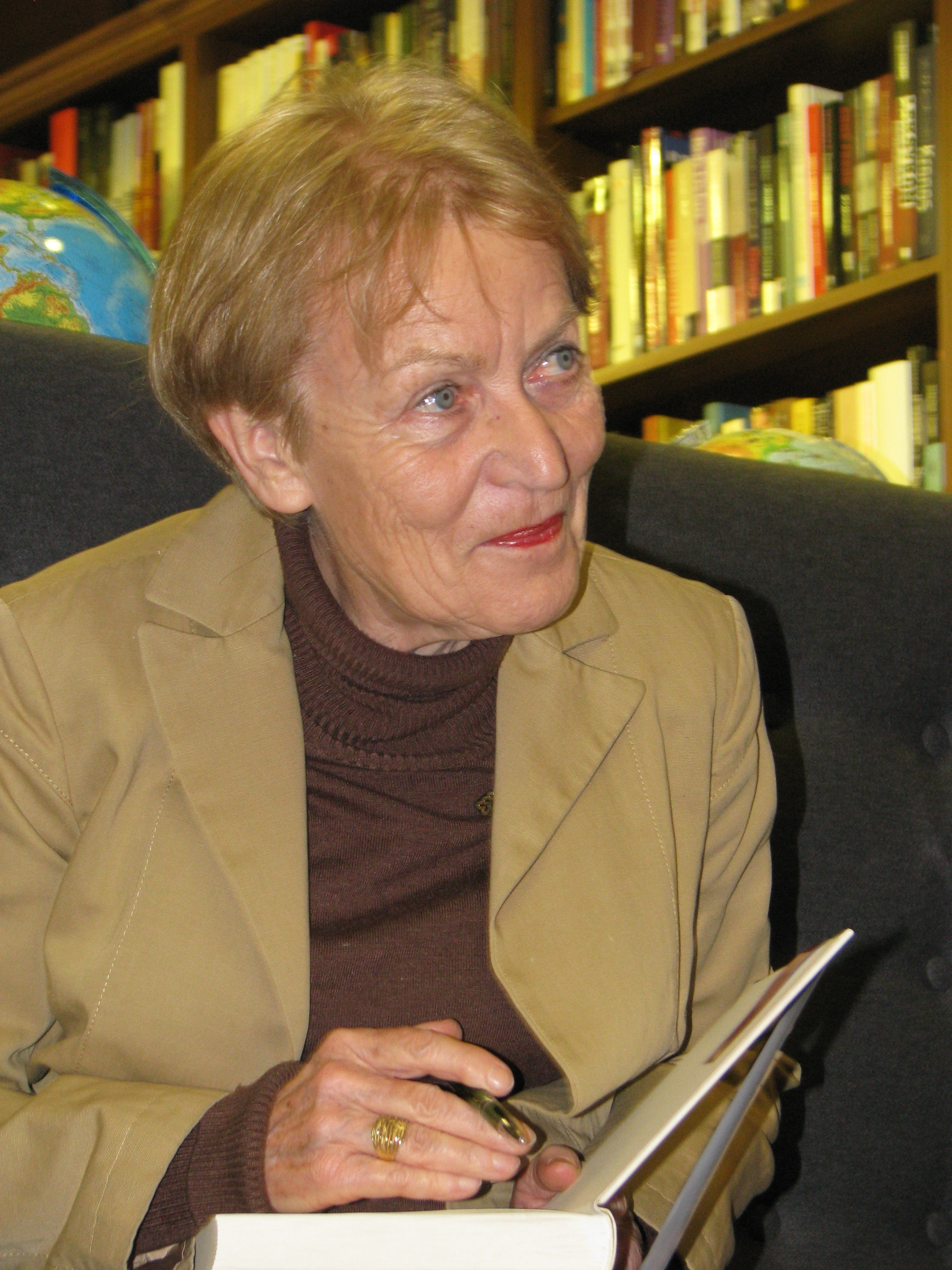
- Szejnert in 2015
- Born: 28 April 1936 (age 90); Warsaw, Poland
- Education: University of Warsaw
- Occupations: writer, journalist
- Writing career
- Language: Polish
- Years active: 1972 – present
- Genre: non-fiction
- Notable works: Czarny ogród (2007); Wyspa klucz (2009)

Małgorzata Szejnert (Polish pronunciation: [mawɡɔˈʐata ˈʂɛjnɛrt]; born 28 April 1936, Warsaw) is a Polish journalist and writer.

== Biography ==
She graduated from the Emilia Plater Girls' High School in Biała Podlaska. She also graduated from the Faculty of Journalism at the University of Warsaw. She was head of the reportage section in the weekly newspaper Literatura. In 1981, after the imposition of martial law in Poland, she collaborated with the underground anti-communist press. In 1984, she moved to the United States where she worked for the Nowy Dziennik daily newspaper. In 1986, she returned to Poland. She is one of the co-founders of Gazeta Wyborcza.

She made her literary debut in 1972, with the publication of Borowiki przy ternpajku, a book about the Polish diaspora in America.

== Awards and honours ==
In 2008, she was nominated to the Angelus Award for her book Czarny ogród (The Black Garden). Her book Wyspa klucz received a nomination to the Nike Award in 2010. Her another work, Usypać góry. Historie z Polesia, was nominated to the Ryszard Kapuściński Award in 2015.

In 2015, she was awarded the Officer's Cross of the Order of Polonia Restituta.

== Bibliography ==
- Borowiki przy ternpajku, Warsaw: Ludowa Spółdzielnia Wydawnicza, 1972.
- Ulica z latarnią, Warsaw: Ludowa Spółdzielnia Wydawnicza, 1977.
- I niespokojnie tu i tam, Olsztyn: Wydawnictwo Pojezierze, 1980.
- Szczecin: Grudzień-Sierpień-Grudzień, współautor Tomasz Zalewski, Warsaw: NOWA, 1984; London: Aneks, 1986.
- Sława i infamia. Rozmowa z Bohdanem Korzeniewskim, London: Aneks,1988; Warszawa: „Pokolenie”, 1988; Kraków: Wydawnictwo Literackie, 1992
- Śród żywych duchów, London: Aneks, 1990; wyd. II, Warsaw: Znak, 2012
- Czarny ogród, Kraków: Społeczny Instytut Wydawniczy Znak, 2007, ISBN 978-83-240-0896-4
- Szczecin: Grudzień-Sierpień-Grudzień współautor Tomasz Zalewski, London: Aneks, 1990;
- Szczecin: Walkowska Wydawnictwo, 2008, ISBN 978-83-924983-2-2
- Wyspa klucz, Kraków: Społeczny Instytut Wydawniczy Znak, 2009, ISBN 978-83-240-1161-2
- Dom żółwia. Zanzibar, Kraków: Społeczny Instytut Wydawniczy Znak, 2011, ISBN 978-83-240-1819-2
- My, właściciele Teksasu. Reportaże z PRL-u, Kraków: Społeczny Instytut Wydawniczy Znak, 2013, ISBN 978-83-240-2121-5.
- Usypać góry. Historie z Polesia, Kraków: Społeczny Instytut Wydawniczy Znak, 2015, ISBN 978-83-240-3287-7

== See also ==
- Polish literature
- List of Polish writers
