= Sandip Soparrkar =

Indian choreographer (born 1964)

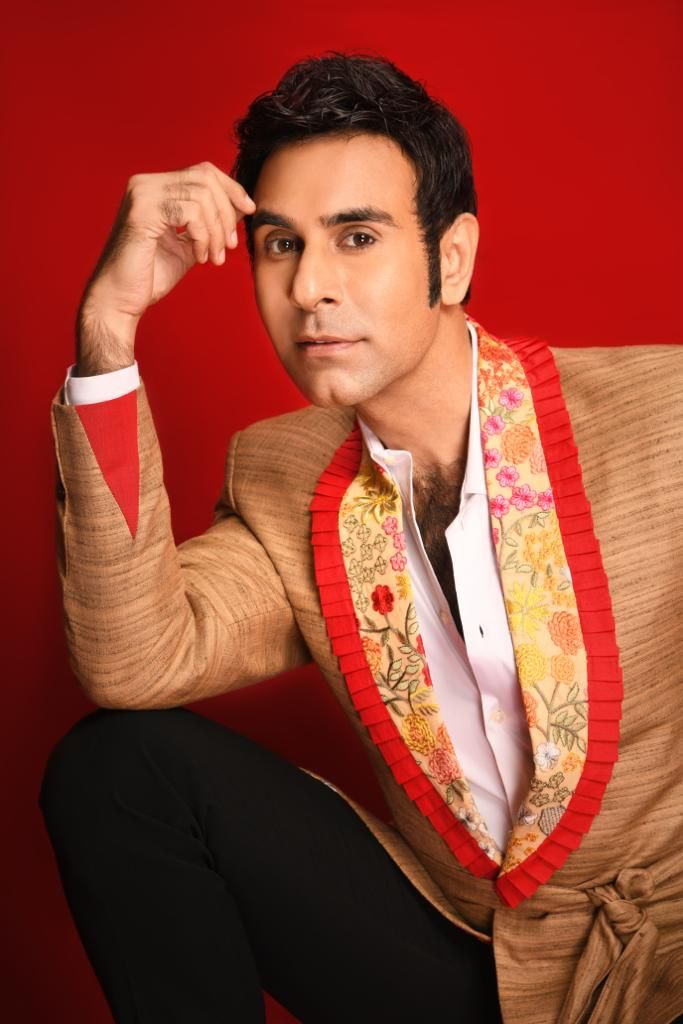
- Sandip
- Born: 6 October 1964 (age 61); Bhopal
- Occupation: Ballroom dancer
- Spouse: Jesse Randhawa (m. 2009; div. 2016)
- Website: sandipsoparrkar.com

Sandip Soparrkar, Baron Sandip Soparrkar (born 6 October 1964) is an Indian Latin and ballroom dancer, choreographer, actor, columnist, philanthropist, dance reality show judge, radio jockey, dance therapist, Sufi and Tanoura Dancer and a Ted X speaker, who holds a doctorate in World Mythology Folklore from Pacifica Graduate Institute United States and also an Honorary Doctorate in Performing arts from The National American University. He has been honoured with 3 National Excellence Awards and 1 National Achievement Award by the Government of India, he is also the recipient of the Rabindranath Tagore Literary Prize for Social Achievement. and the Bharat Gaurav Samaan given by the Ministry of Culture at The House of Lords, London, UK. He is also a recipient of the Shakti Samman given to him in form of a Sword by the Ministry of Culture, Government of India.

He has been honored with the title of Baron by Prestige Tiles, United Kingdom.

The 'Dance Today' Magazine, USA, rated Sandip as one of the '100 most influential dancers in the world'. He was crowned as the 'King of Art4Peace' by the Art4Peace Organisation, Beverly Hills, USA.

He founded "India Dance Week", which combines Indian and international dance. He had a postage stamp issued by the Bhutan Government with his picture and with the logo of his worldwide initiative 'Dance for a Cause'.

He is the Chairperson of India Fine Art Council (IFAC).

Soparrkar was the first dancer choreographer to be on a cover of a Bollywood Magazine – Films Today.

Sandip's portrayal of Shiva in stage production Shivleela directed by Varsha Naik was immortalised through paintings in America, today many hindu temples in USA have his painting of lord Shiva

Queen Elizabeth II and Prince Charles have written letters of appreciation to Sandip Soparrkar for promoting ballroom and Latin dance culture in India. He was the first Indian to be invited to judge the Asian Latin & Ballroom Dance Championship held at Colombo where 32 countries took part with 78 competitive dances. He is the first Indian who was invited to be on the jury of Sharm Shaikh International theatre festival for the youth, Egypt, along with other top theatre personalities from all over the world Soparrkar is a noted contributor to The Asian Age, Afternoon Voice and Newsband newspapers.

Soparrkar is also one of the Board of Directors of the prestigious International Business School Washington (IBSW) which has its branches in The United States of America, France and India.

He is the founder member of Mumba India International Film Festival.

Soparrkar promotes sufi Whirling as a form of moving meditation and self discovery.

== Early life and training ==
Sandip was born in Bhopal, second of the two children to Col Ajay Kumar and Rani Soparkar. He is half Gujarati and half South Indian.

He started his career as a hotel management graduate. He completed his specialization in world cuisine and started working as a cook. At the same time, he started learning Latin and ballroom dances. When he choreographed for Zubeidaa in 2001, he decided to take up dancing as his career option. In 2007, he was unmarried and yet adopted a child named Arjun. In 2021 he went on to adopt a disabled (hearing and speech impaired) boy Kabir.

He married Indian model and actress Jesse Randhawa in 2009 but they separated in 2016.

== Career ==
His first film was Zubaidaa. In 2014, Soparrkar along with his wife Jesse Randhawa represented India at the Cannes Film Festival in France. The duo also performed at the International Marathi Film Festival Award (IMFFA) held in Hong Kong. As "The Indian Ambassador of Dance" Sandip also represented India's dance community at the Madrid International Film Festival, the St Tropez International Film Festival, the Berlin International Film Festival, the Nice International Film Festival, the Global Film Festival, and the World Film Festival.

In 2015, alongside Bollywood actors Raveena Tandon and Tiger Shroff Soparrkar launched a dance festival "India Dance Week" Dance for a Cause. The later editions of it attracted guests such as Govinda (actor), Helen (actress) and Bappi Lahiri., Mandakini (actress), Tusshar Kapoor.

Soparrkar was named the cause ambassador for adoption in India by Catalyst of Social Action (CSA). He is also the brand ambassador for the Rubik's Cube sport in India and face of American NGO "Miracle Foundation" which helps Indian orphanages. Due to his interest in singing, the Karaoke World Championship made Soparrkar an ambassador for this as well.

Colombian singer Shakira, American singers Madonna, Beyoncé Knowles and Britney Spears, and soccer player Diego Madarona have all taken dance instruction from Soparrkar. Bollywood actors Hrithik Roshan, Ameesha Patel, Dino Morea, Kajol, Tabu, Manisha Koirala, Sonam Kapoor, Neha Dhupai, Priyanka Chopra and Richa Tembhurne have also been his students.

Sandip featured on the cover of the Bollywood magazine 'Films Today' in its July 2018 cover the cover was shot at New Jersey Gardens in USA and was designed by Indian fashion designer Chhaya Gandhi.

His debut film as an actor 'I Am Not a Pornstar Nazar Sambhal Ke - Mind you Gaze' sensational poster was released at the World Film Festival in Los Angeles, USA.

He is the official choreographer and show director for Miss India Worldwidecontest (since 2012), which is the longest running Indian beauty pageant outside of India. He is also the official dance and grooming expert for Femina Miss India since 2001 and Miss Diva since 2016. He was also the dance expert for I Am She-Miss Universe India and also a grooming expert for Grasim Mr. India Contest.

As Soparrkar was the brand ambassador for adoptions in India, as well as the first single man in India to adopt, it is believed that he inspired his student Madonna to adopt an Indian baby.

After Soparrkar choreographed Britney Spears hit single Womanizer in 2008 international media went into a frizzy talking about their affair which lasted just for few weeks.

He drew criticism when he declined to perform at the wedding of Prince William and Kate Middleton at Buckingham Palace in 2009.

== Humanitarian Work ==
When Soparrkar became the first single man to adopt in India he was chosen as the 'Cause Ambassador' of Catalyst for Social Action (CSA) an organisation that helps orphans and orphanages in India. He actively promotes the cause of Adoptions all over the world.

He was also chosen as the face of US based NGO The Miracle Foundation, an organisation that seeks to empower orphan kids and raise them in a family-style orphanage with personal attention.

In 2008 he in association with Mrs. Parmenshwar Godrej launched 'Dance for a Cause' at the World Economic Forum in Davos, Switzerland highlighting the Global cause by People for the Ethical Treatment of Animals (PETA) of 'Save the Tiger'. Since then Soparrkar has brought light to various other causes such as AIDS, Organ Donation, Cancer Care, Acid Attack, Drug Abuse, Domestic Violence, Care for the elderly and many more. He has been honoured with the National Excellence award in 2017 by the Government of India. and also the Government of Bhutan issued a postage stamp honouring his worldwide initiative.

He has adopted 2000 underprivileged girls with the support of 'Lets All Help' and is supporting their requirement for sanitary pads. Sandip, has joined Letsallhelp.org as their Change Maker in their quest to achieve their goal

== Controversies ==
As Soparrkar was the brand ambassador for adoptions in India, as well as the first single man in India to adopt, it is believed that he inspired his student Madonna to adopt an Indian baby.

After Soparrkar choreographed Britney Spears's hit single Womanizer in 2008 international media went into a frizzy talking about their affair which lasted just for few weeks

He drew criticism when he declined to perform at the wedding of Prince William and Kate Middleton at Buckingham Palace in 2009.

He was surrounded with people burning his posters during a show for designer Rohit Verma. The creative dancer choreographer mixed live Bihu music and song and danced the traditional Brazilian Samba to it. Little did he realise that this fusion dance which he created did not go down well with a few cultural organisations in Assam. There were people on the streets asking for an apology from the organisers and the choreographer for hurting and insulting Assamese culture with such a fusion. The local people ripped the Samba- Bihu Fusion apart calling it Bollywood dance and saying it was disrespectful to the North East Indian culture. The controversy and anger of people grew even more when Sandip Soparrkar refused to give an apology for what he had created. Sandip Soparrkar said “My dance was a blend of authentic Bihu Music and traditional Samba dance, I did not change the bihu music to fit samba dance nor did I change samba dance to fit into bihu music, they both were used in its pure form, they just blended in so well, it was not a bollywood dance at all like some people are saying.”

He also acted in an adult film titled 'I Am Not A Pornstar Nazar Sambhaal Ke - Mind Your Gaze'.

== Notable performances ==
- 2008 - Pop icon Madonna's 50th Birthday Celebration
- 2009 - Dance at Katy Perry and Russell Brands wedding
- 2009 - 'Save the Snake' as PETA brand ambassador
- 2011 - 'Save the Tiger'
- 2013 - ‘When Gods Meet’
- 2015 - ‘Enchanted Love’ and Indo Korean love saga of 78 AD for Prime Minister of South Korea Mr. Lee Wan-Koo
- 2016 - ‘Save the Peacock’ for Mumbai International Film Festival (MIFF)
- 2016 - Born to Love
- 2017 - Stop Acid Attack
- 2018 - Say no to Drugs
- 2019 - Namami Gange
- 2022 - Why Roses Are Red
- 2023 - Pavitra Tulsi
- 2026 - Shivleela

== Television appearances ==
- 2005 - Dance Divas - on Zoom TV
- 2006 - Stunner 10 - on Bindass TV
- 2007 - India's top Dancer - Zoom TV
- 2008 - Chak De - Shehar Di Kudiyan Te Galli De Gunde - on Channel 9x
- 2009 - Boogie Woogie - India's best Latin dance couple hunt.
- 2010 – He judged 'Dance India Dance L'il Masters Season 1 with Farah Khan on Zee TV
- 2013 - He was jury of Jhalak Dikhhla Jaa UAE Season 2 along with Bollywood veteran choreographer Saroj Khan for Color TV
- 2013 - He judged 'Bharat Ki Shaan - Rum Jhum' along with Indian Classical dance legend Padma Vibhushan Dr. Sonal Mansingh for Doordarshan
- 2014 – He was judge of a dance reality show 'Closeup Bharat Ki Shaan - Let's Dance' on DD National
- 2014 – He also judged 'Jhalak Dikhhla Jaa UAE Dance Extravaganza 2014' season 3 for Color TV
- 2015 - He along with his wife Super Model Jesse Randhawa was seen on Sony Television Show 'Power Couple'
- 2015 - He judged UAE 'Jhalak Dikhhla Jaa' season 4 with renowned Bollywood choreographer Geeta Kapoor for Color TV
- 2016 - He was again seen on UAE television along with choreographer Pony Verma for 'Jhalak Dikhhla Jaa' season 5 for Color TV
- 2016 - Comedy Nights Live
- 2017 - Jhalak Dikhlajaa UAE and South Africa season 6.
- 2018 - Dance Muqabala - TV Asia USA and Canada

== Filmography ==
As a film choreographer

- 2001 - Zubeidaa
- 2004 - Kyun! Ho Gaya Na...
- 2005 - Mangal Pandey: The Rising
- 2005 - The Myth (film) starring Jackie Chan and Mallika Sherawat
- 2007 - Aakashgopuram (Malayalam Film)
- 2008 - Britney Spears Video - Womaniser
- 2008 - Hollywood Film - Nine by Director of Chicago Rob Marshall
- 2009 - Phir Kabhi
- 2010 - Kites
- 2011 - 7 Khoon Maaf Song Daarling and Tango
- 2012 - Rush
- 2012 - Ghost
- 2014 - Holiday: A Soldier Is Never Off Duty
- 2016 - JD
- 2017 - Love Life Screwups (web series)
- 2025 - O Janeja
- 2026 - Koragajja

As a film actor

- 2008 - Hollywood Film - Nine (as an actor and a choreographer) by Director of Chicago Rob Marshall
- 2012 - Ghost (as a special appearance in the title track)
- 2026 - Koragajja (As a special appearance in the track of Guliga Guliga)

As a theater actor

- 2013 - When Gods Meet (Indo Greek dance drama)
- 2015 - Enchanted Love (Indo Korean love story)
- 2015 - Hyacinth (Musical on LGBT issue)
- 2016 - Born to Love (Love story of Cupid)
- 2017 - Jannat Central
- 2018 - Sairandhari - The Musical
- 2020 - Ghat Ghat Mein Panchi Bolta Hai - a play on Pedophilia
- 2022 - Why Roses Are Red - Greek Based Dance Drama
- 2023 - Namami Gange - By Hema Malini
- 2024 - Pavitra Tulsi
- 2024 / 2025 / 2026 - Bekhauff Baatien - Directed by Smita Bharti
- 2024 - Chitrangada - Directed by Madhumita and Tony Chakraborty
- 2024 - Sun Kissed Phoenix - with Indrani Mukerjea
- 2025 - Shivleela - Directed by Varsha Naik

== Nominations ==
- 2010 - He was nominated for song 'Womanizer' by Britney Spears Album 'Circus' for the American Choreography Awards
- 2011 - He was nominated for song 'Fire' from the film 'Kites' at the Screen Awards
- 2012 – He was nominated for "Daarling" from the film "7 Khoon Maaf" at the Screen Awards
- 2013 - Nominated as the ‘Most Stylish Couples on Red Carpet’ by the Cannes Film Festival

== Awards and recognitions ==
- 2014 – Honoured with the National Achievement Award by The Government of India for his work in the field of choreography and dance
- 2014 – 'The Kudos Dance Award' 2014 honoured him with 'India's Best Choreographer' Award
- 2015 – He was honoured with Jewel of Maharashtra award by the alumni of MSIHMCT (Maharashtra State Institute of Hotel Management and Catering Technology)
- 2015 – He was honoured with "Aaj ki Delhi Achievement Award" for his contribution in the Hindi film Industry
- 2015 – He was honoured and awarded by Navi Mumbai International Film Festival (NMIFF) for his outstanding contribution in the field of dance
- 2015 - ‘Most Inspirational Choreographer of the year 2015’ by Indian Film and Television Choreographers Association
- 2016 - ‘National Excellence Award’ by The Government of India
- 2016 - ‘Visionary Award’ by the Lions Club USA and Government of United States of America for Developing a Ballroom Dance Program for the blind
- 2016 - ‘Choreographer of the Year’ by People Choice Hum Log Award
- 2016 - ‘Choreographer with a Heart’ by NBC Newsmakers Achievers Award
- 2016 - ‘Bharat Icon Award’ for best choreographer, by Ministry of India, Government of India
- 2016 - ‘The Humanity Excellence Award’ by We Welfare Society for raising fund and helping various charities in India and abroad
- 2016 - 'Global face of Dance' by Global Film Festival
- 2016 - ‘WOW Personality Award 2016’ for being internationally renowned dance choreographer par excellence
- 2017 - 'Ballroom Dance Jewel Award' by the World Book of Records and Indo-British Intellectuals Forum UK
- 2017 - 'Gaurav Samaan' - for his initiative "Dance for a Cause"
- 2017 - 'Quality Mark Award' - for imparting authentic and pure knowledge of Latin and Ballroom Dancing
- 2017 - 'Golden Achiever Award' - for his outstanding achievement in the field of dance
- 2017 - 'Shakti Samman' - an honour awarded by the Indian Ministry of Culture, which includes a traditional Indian sword
- 2017 - 'National Excellence Award' by The Government of India, for his social initiative 'Dance for a Cause'
- 2017 - Proclamation Citation from Mayor of Edison, New Jersey, USA
- 2018 - Asia's Most Trusted Brand by International Brand Consulting Corp, USA
- 2018 – Postage Stamp by the Government of Bhutan
- 2019 – Assembly Resolution by New Jersey General Assembly, USA
- 2020 - Rabindranath Tagore Social Achievement Prize, by Rabindranath Tagore Literary Prize, Copenhagen, Denmark
- 2020 - Corona Yodha - By Governor of Maharashtra Shri Bhagat Singh Koshyari
- 2021 - APJ Abdul Kalam Bharat Puraskar
- 2021 - Newsmakers Achievers Awards.
- 2022 - Bharat Gaurav Samaan at The House of Lords, London, UK
- 2022 - Crowned King of Art4PPeace
- 2023 - Nalanda Kanak Nartan Puraskar
- 2024 - Jeeva Ratan Samaan at Sangeet Natak Akademi by Sonal Mansingh
- 2026 - Proclamation from the United States House of Representatives, presented by Jefferson Van Drew, Congressman from New Jersey.
