= Rana Dasgupta =

British Indian novelist and essayist (born 1971)

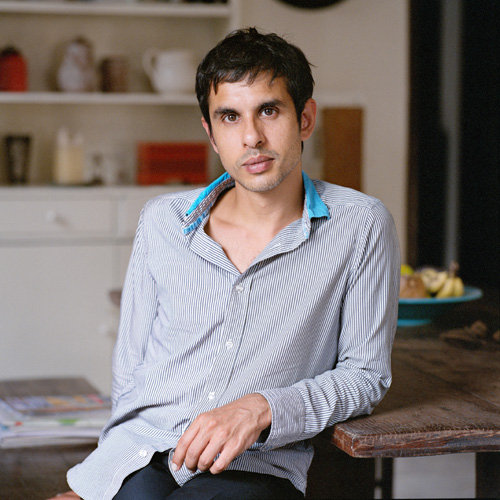
- Dasgupta at home in Delhi, April 2010
- Born: Rana Dasgupta; 5 November 1971 (age 55); Canterbury, England
- Occupations: Novelist, essayist
- Writing career
- Notable work: Capital: A Portrait of Twenty-First Century Delhi (2014)
- Notable awards: Commonwealth Writers' Prize for Best Book (2010); Rabindranath Tagore Literary Prize (2019); Windham–Campbell Literature Prize (2025)

Rana Dasgupta (born 5 November 1971) is an English novelist and essayist. In 2010, The Daily Telegraph called him one of Britain's best novelists under 40. In 2014, Le Monde named him one of 70 people who are making the world of tomorrow. Among the prizes won by Dasgupta's works are the Commonwealth Prize and the Ryszard Kapuściński Award.

Dasgupta is a former literary director of the JCB Prize for Literature.

== Early life and education ==
Dasgupta was born in Canterbury to English mother Barbara and Bengali father Ashish from Calcutta and grew up in Cambridge alongside his younger sister Mitali. Dasgupta attended a boys' school. He went on to graduate with a degree in French literature from Balliol College, Oxford in 1994. He also studied piano at the Conservatoire Darius Milhaud in Aix-en-Provence, France and was a Fulbright Scholar at the University of Wisconsin–Madison in Madison, Wisconsin, United States, pursuing Media Studies.

== Career ==
Dasgupta's first novel, Tokyo Cancelled (HarperCollins, 2005), was an examination of the forces and experiences of globalisation. Billed as a modern-day Canterbury Tales, it is about thirteen passengers stuck overnight in an airport who tell thirteen stories from different cities in the world, stories that resemble contemporary fairy tales, mythic and surreal. The tales add up to a broad exploration of 21st-century forms of life, which includes billionaires, film stars, migrant labourers, illegal immigrants and sailors.

Dasgupta's second novel, Solo (HarperCollins, 2009), was an epic tale of the 20th and 21st centuries told from the perspective of a 100-year-old Bulgarian man. Having achieved little in his 20th-century life, he settles into a long and prophetic daydream of the 21st century, where all the ideological experiments of the old century are over, and a collection of startling characters – demons and angels – live a life beyond utopia. A reviewer described it as "unfazed by the 21st century, confidently tracing the wrong turnings of the past 100 years, soaring insightfully over the mess of global developments that constitute the quagmire of today". Solo was translated into 9 languages.

Dasgupta was awarded the prestigious Commonwealth Writers' Prize for the novel Solo; it won both the region and overall best-book prize.

Dasgupta's third book, Capital: A Portrait of Twenty-First-Century Delhi (Canongate, 2014), is a non-fiction exploration of his adopted city of Delhi and, in particular, the changes and personalities brought about there by globalisation. Capital won the Ryszard Kapuściński Award and Prix Émile Guimet de Littérature Asiatique. The book was also a finalist for the Orwell Prize, Ondaatje Prize, and Prix du Meilleur Livre Étranger.

Dasgupta's next book, After Nations: The Making and Unmaking of a World Order (Viking, 2026) is set to release on 28 April 2026.

== Academic appointments ==
In 2014 to 2018, Rana Dasgupta was a Writer-in-Residence and Distinguished Visiting Lecturer at Brown University.

In 2017 to 2020, Rana Dasgupta created the JCB Price for Literature and served as its Literary Director.

== Awards ==
- 2010: Commonwealth Writers' Prize for Best Book for his novel Solo
- 2017: Ryszard Kapuściński Award for Capital
- 2019: Rabindranath Tagore Literary Prize for Solo
- 2025: Windham–Campbell Literature Prize for Capital

== Bibliography ==
=== Fiction ===
- Tokyo Cancelled (2005)
- Solo (2009)

=== Non-fiction ===
- Capital: A Portrait of Twenty-First Century Delhi (2014)
- After Nations (2026)

=== Essays ===
- "Maximum Cities" (New Statesman, 27 March 2006)
- "Capital Gains" (Granta 107, Summer 2009)
- "Writing into the unknown" (Nagledna+, 2013)
- "Notes on a Suicide" (Granta 140, Summer 2017)
- "The Demise of the Nation State" (The Guardian, 5 April 2018)
- "The Silenced Majority: Can America Still Afford Democracy?" (Harper's Magazine 341, no. 2,047, December 2020, pp. 47–56)

=== Further reading ===
- Mendes, AC, Lau, L. (2018) "The conjunctural spaces of 'new India': Imagined geographies of 2010s India in representations by returnee migrants", Cultural Geographies, 1–16. DOI: 10.1177/1474474018786033.
- Mendes, AC. (2018) "The eruption and ruination of 1rising India1: Rana Dasgupta’s Capital and the temporalities of Delhi in the 2010s", Modern Asian Studies, 1–25. DOI: 10.1017/S0026749X17000464.
