= Capital: The Eruption of Delhi =

2014 book by Rana Dasgupta

- First US edition
- Author: Rana Dasgupta
- Language: English
- Subject: Delhi
- Publisher: Penguin Books (US); Canongate Books (UK)
- Publication date: 2014
- Publication place: United Kingdom
- Pages: 464
- ISBN: 9780857860040
- Dewey Decimal: 954.56053

Capital: The Eruption of Delhi (also published as Capital: A Portrait of Twenty-First Century Delhi) is a 2014 book by British-born, Indian-based writer Rana Dasgupta.

== Background and synopsis ==
Capital is an exploration of the transformation of Delhi since Dasgupta first moved to the city in 2001. It explores the changes Delhi has experienced since the boom of the Indian economy, particularly through encounters with residents of Delhi, ranging from billionaires to slum dwellers and drug dealers to metal traders. These personal stories are interwoven with over a century of history of the city.

== Reception ==
Writing for The Observer Jason Burke praised Capital as an "intense, lyrical, erudite and powerful book" but wrote that Dasgupta's "unstated but apparent nostalgia for rural life...sometimes jars. There is nothing particularly bucolic about India's villages."

In 2017 Capital received the Ryszard Kapuściński Award for Literary Reportage. It was also short-listed for the Orwell Prize and for the Royal Society of Literature Ondaatje Prize.
