= Nirmala Govindarajan =

Indian novelist and journalist

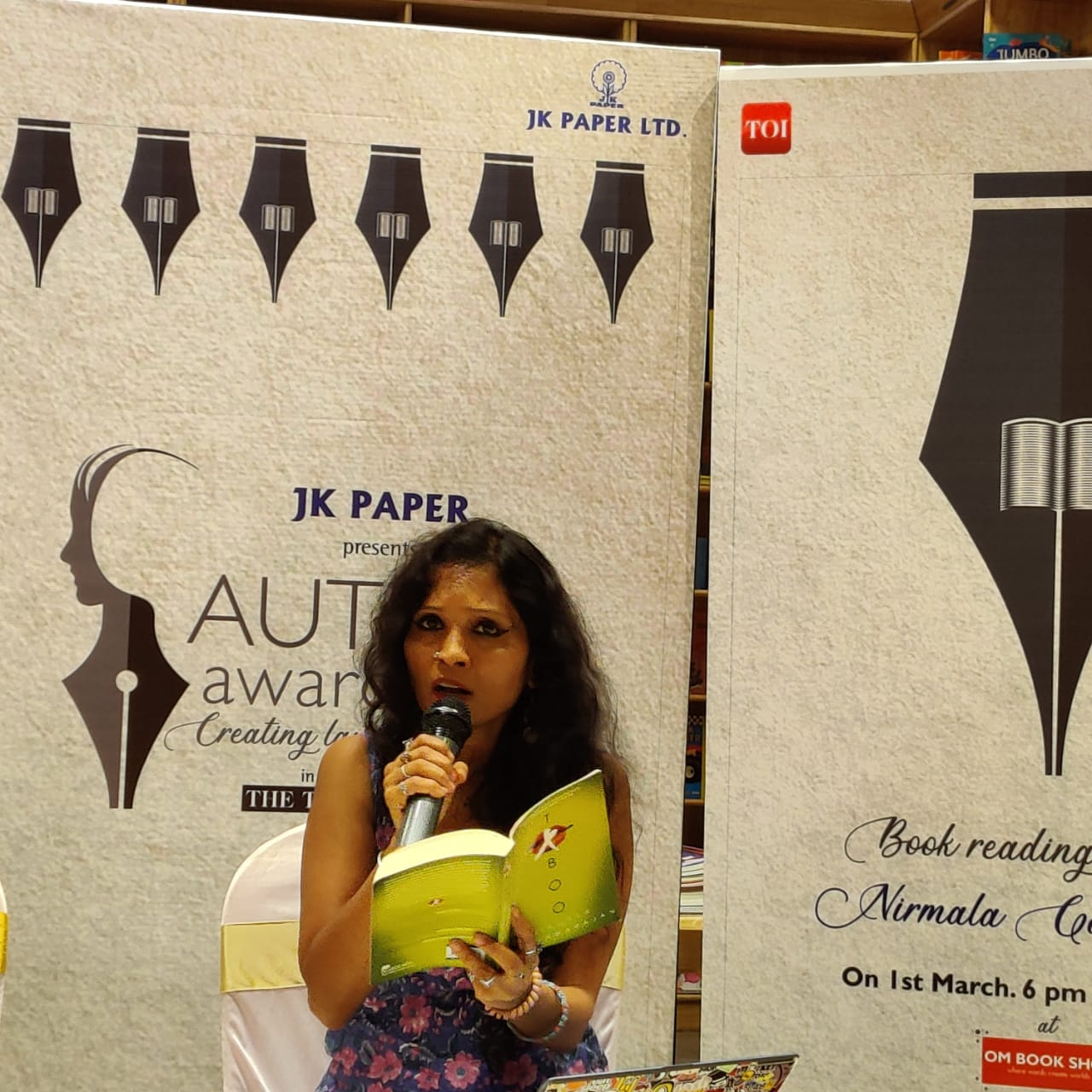
- Nirmala Govindarajan
- Occupations: Novelist and journalist
- Writing career
- Language: English
- Website: Official website

Nirmala Govindarajan is an Indian novelist and journalist. Her novel Taboo (2019) was shortlisted for the Rabindranath Tagore Literary Prize and was longlisted for the Atta Galatta Bangalore Literature Festival Book Prize in 2020.

== Biography ==
Based in Bengaluru, Nirmala Govindarajan started writing during her college education, and later started her career as a journalist. She presently works as a social sector documentarian. In 2014, Nirmala co-curated the debut Times Literary Carnival, Bangalore, and in 2016, debuted the Literary Lounge series at the British Council, Bangalore.

== Works ==
Govindarajan's works mostly deal with issues of trafficking, exploitation and Child labour, and use allegories, metaphors and stream of consciousness technique. Her works have been written in lyrical prose. She published her first novel Community Catalyst in 2016. It is inspired by the real life experience of Bharat Lal Meena, former additional chief secretary, Department of Higher Education of Karnataka.

Her novel Hunger's Daughters (2018) is based on her experience of documenting in India's rural heartland. The novel is a poetic portrayal of vulnerable lives. The novel tells a story of freedom, identity and independence. Its protagonists are little girls from the unmapped forest hamlets of Orissa, Jharkhand and Karnataka. It talks of Susanthi Bodra, a small girl who lives in a remote village in Odisha. She is pressed to earn at a very young age because her father is presumed dead and her mother has gone missing. Another girl, Nelli, aged 8, runs off from her mistress's home, gets kidnapped and sold in a brothel in Nagpur. For two decades, her mother Gowravva, has been awaiting her return to their home in Kithapur hamlet.

Her novel Taboo (2019), is inspired by underage girls who are kidnapped and trafficked. It speaks of female power and identity. The story revolves around the Lady with the Slender Hands who traverses people, illegal trades and regions to map her back to who she was, so she can finally claim the freedom of who she wants to be. Taboo takes place in South-East Asia, from Spain to Sri Lanka and Tamil Nadu. It explores the psychological and physiological aspects of girls in the sex trade. It depicts themes of human trafficking and child prostitution. The novel poses several questions about a democratic society and its politics, and their objective to stop these practices.

Govindarajan has co-authored two books: Mind Blogs 1.0 and Trailblazers of Bangalore. She has written for The Times of India, The Hindu, Deccan Herald, India Today, and The Sunday Guardian.

== Honour ==
Her novel Taboo (2019) was shortlisted for the Rabindranath Tagore Literary Prize and was longlisted for the Atta Galatta Bangalore Literature Festival Book Prize in 2020. The novel was also longlisted for the fiction category of JK Paper Auther Awards.
