= Vithal V. Kamat =

Indian hotelier and environmentalist

Vithal Venkatesh Kamat
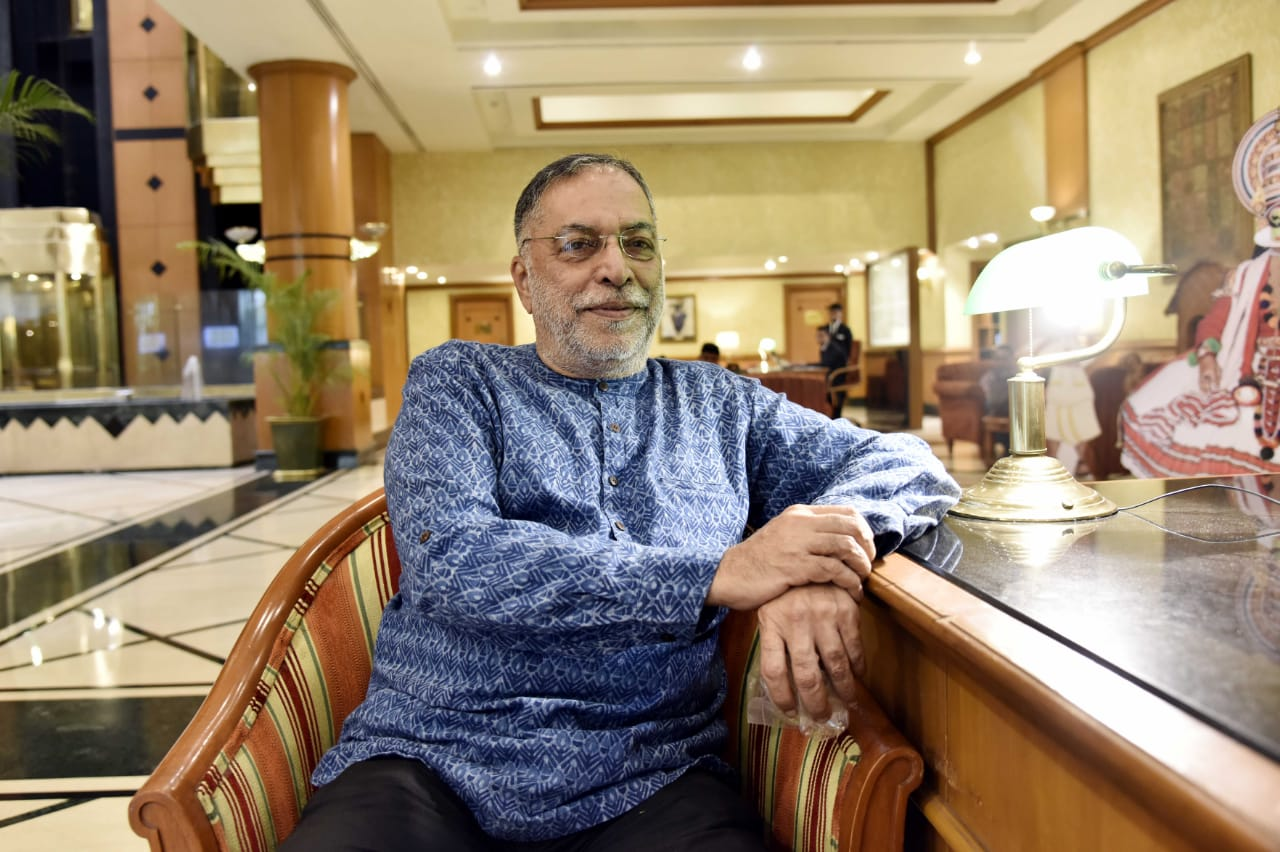
- Occupation: Hotelier
- Known for: Kamat Hotels
- Spouse: Vidhya Kamat
- Children: 3

Vithal Venkatesh Kamat is an Indian hotelier and environmentalist who is Executive Chairman and Managing Director of Kamat Hotels Group Limited. He is a Konkani GSB.

== Early life and career ==
He was born to Venkatesh Kamat in Mumbai. His father worked as a dishwasher and busboy. In 1952 he opened his first restaurant 'Satkar'. Vithal joined his father in 1970 and is now the Chairman of Asia"s first Ecotel hotel "The Orchid".

He worked as a cook in a restaurant in London and learnt the hotel business skills there. After returning to India he started with the basic principles of green development, and opened India's first Ecotel hotel "The Orchid". He is a visiting faculty at IIM Ahmedabad, BITS Pilani and many management institutes in India and abroad. In 1984 Kamat bought a four star hotel 'Airport Plaza' and changed its name to Kamat Plaza later called Kamat hotels.

== Personal life ==
He married Vidhya Kamat. They have three children.

== Other activities ==
He planted more than 60 lakh trees and transformed over 100 acres of hillock into medicinal plants and local trees for forestation. He is also credited with constructing the first Butterfly Garden in Mumbai and other gardens across Mumbai and Navi Mumbai, in addition to the Child Gives Birth to a Mother monuments erected in various parts of the country.

Kamat is involved with more than 1200 Advance Locality Management for maintaining clean and hygienic streets in India. His annual practices include the conversion of over 100 tons of "Nirmalya" (flower offerings) into manure after the Ganapati immersions in Mumbai. His hotel is also fully eco-friendly.

As a conservationist and an ornithologist, he has created "Raghu–Chivu Galli" (Parrot & Sparrow Street) in Mumbai, preservation and procreation of Turtle Eggs in Konkan and Orissa, and the conservation of deer near Fort Jadhavgadh, Pune. He is also in the process of setting up a "Dolphin Observatory Centre" in Chilika Lake, Orissa. A keen Antiquarian with a collection of over 35,000 exhibits, Kamat has also set up "Aai" - The "Mother Museum" in Mumbai and Fort Jadhavgadh, Pune.

Kamat is also a fine art collector who collects artifacts and antiquities from across the country. Kamat opened a small public showcase of antiques called Aai Museum in The Orchid hotel Mumbai. His Churchgate residence has 10,800 Ganesha statues and 11,000 turtle artifacts. He also owns India's first museum hotel - Fort Jadhavgadh.

== Awards and recognition ==
Kamat received more than 110 national and international awards that includes Best CEO of Industry Award by The Indian Express, Golden Peacock Award received from the Dalai Lama, Lifetime Achievement Award 2012 in Germany, Green Hotelier Award 2010, Rajiv Gandhi Environment Award 2010, Golden Peacock Environment Management Award 2010 by Ola Ullsten.

He was the President of the Maharashtra Economic Development Council (MEDC), Vice President of the Hotel and Restaurant Association of Western India, Member of the Priyadarshini Academies Global Award Advisory Committee, and Chairman of the Technical Education Mumbai Board to name a few.

Kamat received Newsmakers Achievers Awards in 2021.

== Bibliography ==
- Yash Apyash Aani Mi, ISBN 9789385223624
- Idli Orchid & Will Power, ISBN 9789383359158
