= Ssumier Pasricha =

Indian actor, singer and businessman

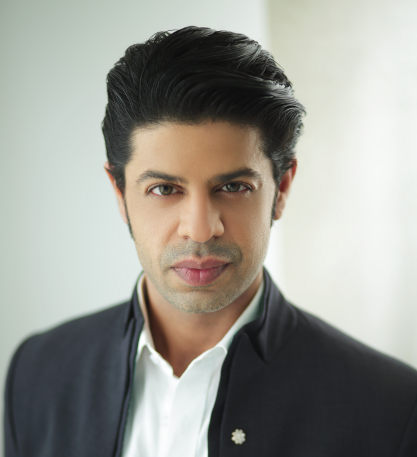
- Born: 12 May 1980 (age 46); Delhi, India
- Other name: Pammi Aunty
- Education: Modern School; University of Notre Dame
- Notable work: Creating viral comedy Youtube videos
- Parent(s): Surinder Pasricha (Father), Ritu Pasricha (Mother)

Comedy career
- Years active: 2011–present
- Medium: Writer, Singer, Comedian, Presenter, Actor
- Genre: Satirical

Ssumier S Pasricha is an Indian actor, singer and businessman. He has starred in Indian movies, TV soaps and theater musicals. He is popularly known for his character 'Pammi Aunty' and has created viral videos with the same. Ssumier has won various awards worldwide including the Bharat Shiromani Award for this acting.

== Early life ==
Ssumier comes from a Punjabi family in Delhi. He received 5 years of training in Indian classical dance (Kuchipudi) from famous dance gurus, Raja and Radha Reddy and 13 years of training in Indian classical music. He went to Australia for higher studies where he worked as a Radio Jockey at a local radio station and became an active member of Indian Society of Western Australia. Ssumier declined the offer to join his family business to pursue his childhood dream of becoming an actor. He moved to Mumbai to take up acting as his full-time career. However, post his father's demise, Ssumier took up a new role of a businessman and joined his family business of Pharmaceuticals with a new aim of taking it to newer heights.

== Career ==
Ssumier has worked across different mediums and has tasted success in the industry over the years. He also portrayed the role of "Shailu" in the TV soap, Sasural Simar Ka, and played the transgender protagonist Manabi Bandyopadhyay (who became a principal of a college) in TV show Code Red. His international projects include theatre musicals like 'Jesus Christ Super Star and Heart to Heart'. He has worked with director, Shekhar Kapur, in the musical 'Mahim Junction'. He has starred alongside actor Abhishek Bacchan in a TV commercial for the mobile network operator Idea Cellular. Ssumier also features on comedy TV show Comedy Nights Bachao.

=== Pammi Aunty ===
Ssumier has gained popularity for creating viral videos based on a fictional character 'Pammi Aunty'-- impersonation of a typical middle-class Delhi Punjabi woman who loves to gossip, crib and complain about many things to her friends over the phone. Ssumier came up with the idea of creating 'Pammi Aunty' while experimenting with filters in the video social media app, Snapchat. Celebrities such as veteran actor, Rishi Kapoor, and British-Indian director Gurinder Chadha, have publicly appreciated the 'Pammi Aunty' videos.

== Filmography ==
=== Television and digital (shows and campaigns) ===
Year	Show	Channel	Notes
2011–2015	Sasural Simar Ka	Colors (TV channel)	Shailu/Shailendra Bharadwaj
2012	Teri Meri Love Stories	Star Plus	
2015	Code Red	Colors (TV channel)	Shubroto/ Supriya
2015	Pyaar Tune Kya Kiya (TV series) Season 3 Episode 7	Zing (TV channel)	Rahmann
2016	Comedy Nights Bachao season 2	Colors TV	Himself
2017	Zee Cine Awards	Zee TV	Red Carpet Host
2017	Jio Filmfare Awards – Punjabi	MH One	Host
2017	MTV Roadies Rising – Pammi Aunty Critic	Voot	Special Show
2017	Pammi Aunty (web series)	ALT Balaji	
2017	Diwali Campaign	Amazon India	Digital Campaign
2017	Campaign for Kurkure	Pepsico India	Digital Campaign
2019	Tenali Rama	Sony SAB	Played the character of Sheikh Chilli.
2021	Khel Paheliyon Ka	Flipkart	Host as Pammi Aunty.
2023–2024	Pyar Ka Pehla Adhyaya: Shiv Shakti	Zee TV	Purnendu

=== Film ===
Year	Film	Director	Actors	Genre
2016	Doc' it yourself	Kevin Rumley	NA	Documentary.
2021	Chandigarh Kare Aashiqui	Abhishek Kapoor	Ayushmann Khurrana, Vaani Kapoor	Feature Film.

=== Theatre ===
Year	Play	Role	Notes
2017	Amavas se Amaltas	Man with Autism	with Jayati Bhatia, Ankita Bhargava and Chitrashi Rawat
2009-2011	Mahim junction	Randy Bhai	Directed by Sohaila Kapur and Shekhar Kapur
2009	Woh Din Wo Log	Chabba	Directed by Sabina Mehta Jaitly
2007	Heart to heart	Self	Directed by Vivek Mansukhani
2002	Ali Baba Chalis Chor	Abdullah	--

=== TV commercials ===
Year	Brand
2016	Tata Cliq
2015	PediaSure
2013	Snapdeal
2013	McDonald's
2013	IPL
2012	Mahindra & Mahindra Bike
2011	The Pitch
2011	Imperial Blue
2010	Idea

=== Music ===
Year	Song	Label	Genre
2020	Teri jyota to balihari	T series	Devotional
2021	Jai Kali Jai Mahakali	Shreeng Entertainment	Devotional

== Photography ==
Ssumier is also a professional photographer. He has done photoshoots for magazines such as National Geographic. His photos have been carried by other international magazines in Spain, Australia and New Zealand.

== Association with Jordan Tourism ==
Jordan Tourism has collaborated with Ssumier to drive more Indian tourists to the country. Ssumier has been asked to make promotional videos starring Pammi Aunty to showcase the tourist attractions in Jordan.

== Association with social causes ==
Ssumier has been associated with the educational online platform Agents of Ishq, which provides educational material about sex, sexuality, and gender. He made a 'Pammi Aunty' video to de-stigmatize homosexuality in India.

He has also supported AIDS awareness initiatives such as Red Ribbon campaign in India.

In a video appeal, he urged Prime Minister of India, Narendra Modi, to take action for crimes against women in Delhi

Year	Event
2017	Performer at Jaspal Bhatti Humor Festival
2017	TedX Chandigarh - Speaker on Black Sheep Syndrome
2017	Sriram College of Commerce, Delhi - Speaker on Leadership
2017	India Today Mind Rocks Youth Summit - Speaker

== Awards ==
Year	Awards
2021	ITA Awards: Social Media Star
2019	Young Achievers Award 2019: Rotary Club (Mumbai West)
2019	The vIDEA Awards 2019 - Video Influencer of the Year
2019	Bharat Shiromani Award
2019	Entertainer of the year - Delhiites Lifestyle Award 2019
2019	TimesNow Power Brand Digital Media Trendsetter Award
2018	Best Comedian in a Web Series - IWM Digital Awards
2018	DIGIXX Star Entertainer Award 2018
2018	Person of the Year - Content Award at VDOnxt Awards
2017	Best Internet Sensation Award - Nickelodeon ka Digital Star - Nickelodeon Kids Choice Awards
2017	Honoured by House of Commons UK for contribution to Indian British society & culture
2017	Elite Magazine 25 of Delhi's most Influential entrepreneurs
2017	Icon of the year by India Today
2017	Best Actor - Rajdhani Ratn Award
2017	Marketing Influencer of the Year Award by InkSpell
2017	NBC Newsmakers Achievers Award - Best Actor Comedy
2017	Talentrack Awards - Best Actor Comedy
2017	Jordan Tourism Board Award
2016	Humour King of the year - Outlook social media awards
2016	Entertainer of the year - DissDash
