= Narrative Inquiry (journal) =

- Discipline: Narrative
- Language: English
- Edited by: Dorien Van De Mieroop, Allyssa McCabe

Publication details
- Former name(s): Journal of Narrative and Life History
- History: 1991-present
- Publisher: John Benjamins Publishing Company
- Frequency: Biannual
- Open access: Hybrid
- Impact factor: 0.583 (2021)

Standard abbreviations
- ISO 4: Narrat. Inq.

Indexing
- ISSN: 1387-6740 (print); 1569-9935 (web)
- OCLC no.: 645276565

Links
- Journal homepage; Online access; Online archive

Narrative Inquiry is a biannual peer-reviewed academic journal published by John Benjamins Publishing Company covering work on narrative. It was established in 1991 by Lawrence Erlbaum Associates as the Journal of Narrative and Life History and obtained its current title in 1998 when it moved to its present publisher. The editors-in-chief are Dorien Van De Mieroop (KU Leuven) and Allyssa McCabe (University of Massachusetts Lowell).

== Abstracting and indexing ==
The journal is abstracted and indexed in:

- Arts and Humanities Citation Index
- Current Contents/Arts & Humanities
- Current Contents/Social and Behavioral Sciences
- EBSCO databases
- International Bibliography of Periodical Literature
- Modern Language Association Database
- ProQuest databases
- PsycINFO
- Scopus
- Social Sciences Citation Index

== Reception ==
The journal's most cited papers, as of 2022 include:

- Bamberg, Michael (29 August 2006). "Stories: Big or small: Why do we care?". Narrative Inquiry. 16 (1): 139–147. doi:10.1075/ni.16.1.18bam.
- Georgakopoulou, Alexandra (29 August 2006). "Thinking big with small stories in narrative and identity analysis". Narrative Inquiry. 16 (1): 122–130. doi:10.1075/ni.16.1.16geo. S2CID 205389653.
- Baerger, Dana Royce; McAdams, Dan P. (1 January 1999). "Life Story Coherence and its Relation to Psychological Well-Being". Narrative Inquiry. 9 (1): 69–96. doi:10.1075/ni.9.1.05bae.

According to the Journal Citation Reports, the journal has a 2020 impact factor of 0.583.
