= Carole Peterson =

American–Canadian child psychologist

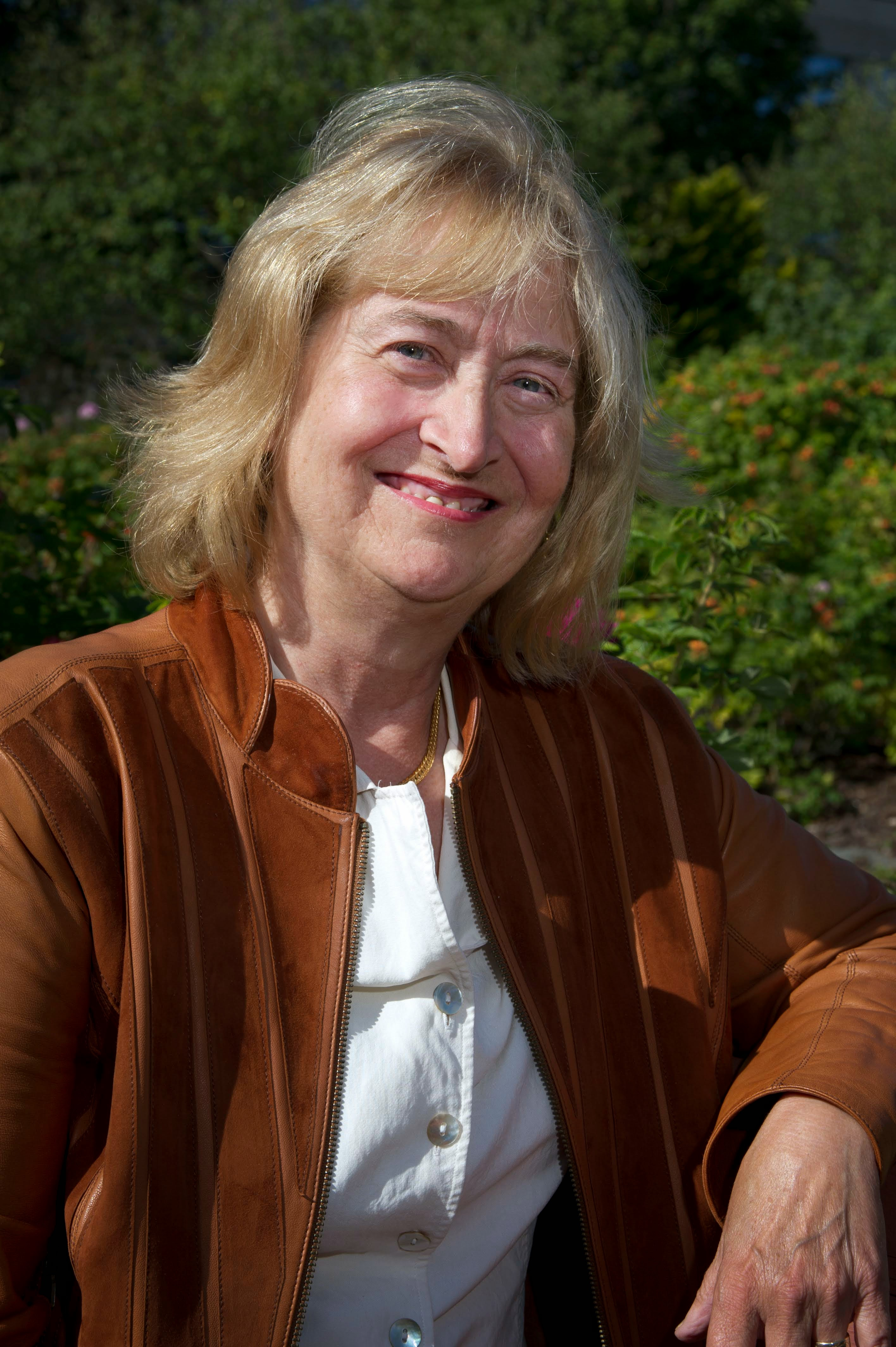
- Carole Peterson in 2012

Academic background
- Education: BSc, University of Washington; PhD, 1974, University of Minnesota
- Thesis: Communicative and narrative behavior of pre-school aged children (1974)

Carole L. Menig-Peterson FRSC (born 1947) is an American–Canadian child psychologist. She is a professor at Memorial University of Newfoundland who specializes in early childhood memory. In 2012, Peterson was elected a Fellow of the Royal Society of Canada for pioneering narrative ability, eyewitness memory, and early childhood amnesia.

== Early life and education ==
As an undergraduate student at the University of Washington, Peterson was named a National Merit Finalist. Upon graduating, she enrolled at the University of Minnesota for her PhD.

== Career ==
Following her PhD in 1974, Peterson spent over a decade outside of academia before accepting a faculty position at Memorial University of Newfoundland (MUN) in 1991. Her research at MUN heavily focused on children's development of narrative skills and children's memory. In 2012, she was elected a Fellow of the Royal Society of Canada for pioneering narrative ability, eyewitness memory, and early childhood amnesia. Peterson continued to conduct research on childhood memory as it pertains to the legal system. In 2016, she received a grant to lead a five-year study titled "Assessing Interviews and Recall in Children." The aim of the study was to improve children's credibility as witnesses. In 2021, Peterson revealed that one's earliest memories could date back to when they were two-and-a-half years old, despite most people placing their earliest memories as happening at three-and-a-half to four years old.
