= David Dickinson (academic) =

American teaching and learning educator

David Dickinson is an American scholar in educational development, strategy and understanding, currently the Margaret Cowan Chair at Vanderbilt University. He graduated from Harvard Graduate School of Education.
