= Masahiko Minami (academic) =

Masahiko Minami (南 雅彦, Minami Masahiko) is a linguistics professor at San Francisco State University where he specializes in Japanese language and cross-cultural studies. He is editor-in-chief of the Journal of Japanese Linguistics (De Gruyter Mouton) and associate editor of Narrative Inquiry (John Benjamins). He is also coordinator for the Japanese Language Proficiency Test (日本語能力試験, Nihongo Nōryoku Shiken: JLPT) for Northern California. In addition, he served as president of the Foreign Language Association of Northern California (FLANC) and President of the Northern California Japanese Teachers’ Association (NCJTA).

Minami received a PhD from Harvard University under the supervision of Catherine E. Snow and Allyssa McCabe.

== Selected works ==
- Minami, Masahiko; Kennedy, Bruce P. (1991). Language issues in literacy and bilingual/multicultural education. Cambridge, MA: Harvard Educational Review. ISBN 0-916690-24-5.
- Minami, Masahiko; Sato, Kimiyo (2001). Bunka to shinrigaku (Culture and psychology). Kyoto: Kitaoji Shobo. ISBN 4-7628-2220-5.
- Minami, Masahiko (2002). Culture-specific language styles: The development of oral narrative and literacy. Clevedon, UK: Multilingual Matters. ISBN 1-85359-573-X.
- Minami, Masahiko (2007). Applying theory and research to learning Japanese as a foreign language. Newcastle, UK: Cambridge Scholars Publishing. ISBN 978-1-84718-289-0.
- Minami, Masahiko (2009). Gengo to bunka: Gengogaku kara yomitoku kotoba no barieeshon (Language and culture: Understanding language variations from the viewpoint of linguistic theories). Tokyo: Kurosio Publishers. ISBN 978-4-87424-459-3.
- Minami, Masahiko (2011). Telling stories in two languages: Multiple approaches to understanding English-Japanese bilingual children's narratives. Charlotte, NC: IAP-Information Age Publishing. ISBN 978-1-61735-354-3.
- Minami, Masahiko (2016). Handbook of Japanese Applied Linguistics. Berlin/Boston: De Gruyter Mouton. ISBN 978-1-61451-183-0.
