= Star Hotel, Great Yarmouth =

Hotel in Norfolk, England

The Star Hotel
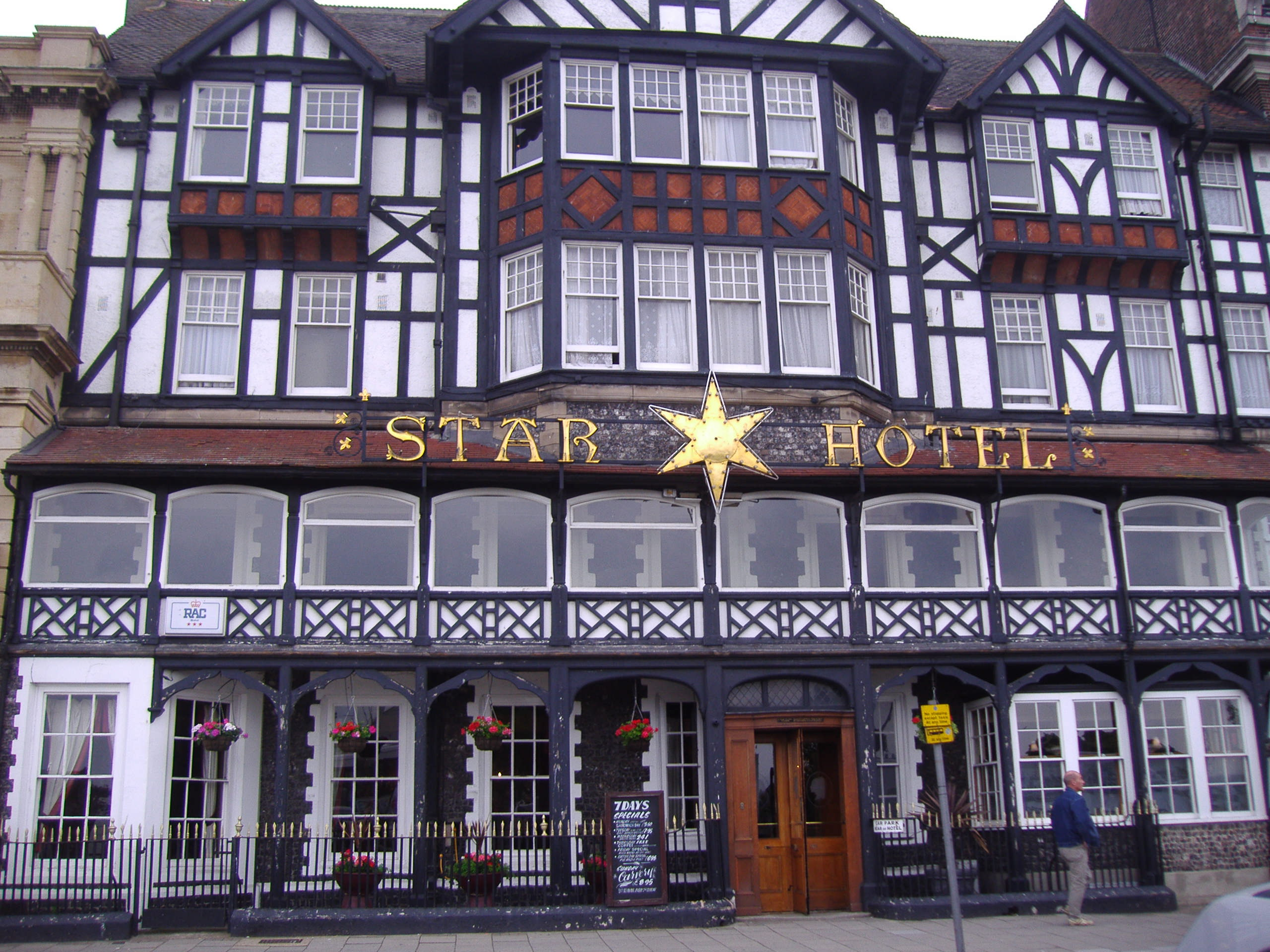
- The Star Hotel

- Norfolk

General information
- Location: Great Yarmouth, Norfolk, England, Hall Quay; Great Yarmouth; Norfolk; NR30 1HG
- Coordinates: 52°36′24.1″N 1°43′28.7″E

Other information
- Number of rooms: 40 en suite bedrooms
- Number of restaurants: 1 (Star Hotel Restaurant)
- Number of bars: 1 (Quay Merchant’s Bar)
- Facilities: Conference and Meeting rooms Banquet suite
- Parking: Yes

Website
- Hotel website

Listed Building – Grade II
- Designated: 26 February 1998
- Reference no.: 1246968

The Star Hotel is a 3 star (self assessed) hotel in the English town of Great Yarmouth within the county of Norfolk in the United Kingdom. The hotel has been a grade II listed building since 26 February 1998.

== Location ==
The hotel is in the North Quay area of Great Yarmouth and is close to the town centre. Great Yarmouth railway station is 0.8 miles (1.3 km) south east of the hotel. The nearest Airport is in Norwich Airport and is 22.4 miles (36.0 km) west of the hotel. The Market Gates Bus Station in Great Yarmouth is 0.3 miles (0.48 km) from the hotel and is in easy walking distance. Great Yarmouth sea front is 0.8 miles (1.3 km) east of the hotel.

== History ==
The building the Hotel occupies today dates from the 17th century and is amalgamation of two flint faced buildings which had been originally built by wealthy merchants, of which, at the time, there were many in this sea port town. During the 1600s there were many merchants in Yarmouth, many of whom had arrived in the town from Holland. They had arrived following the devastation that the Black Death had reaped on the town, killing upwards of 7000 townsfolk. These merchants had become prosperous, dealing in fish, grain and wool exports. Many merchants built fine brick and stone town houses along the quay side. Very few examples of these houses survive in the town today, but of those that are left, the present Star Hotel is one. This original merchant's house was built by William Crowe. He was a very wealthy man, and was twice the bailiff of Yarmouth. His house was on one of the prime residential areas of the town, close to the bridge across the River Yare which marked the main road into town. By the 18th century the house had become the property of Thomas Dawson. The house then passed over to the ownership of Robert Wilson who was a corn merchant. Following his death, the house was passed into the ownership of the Bradshaw family. In the latter part of the 18th century the property was converted from a house to the Star Tavern by the Bradshaw family. The Bradshaws also converted a malt house connected to the property into stables and a coach house, a necessary facility of any tavern of that period. Over the next hundred years the Star had several different owners. In 1822 the landlord was Mr William Woolverton. During his tenure he made several improvements to the tavern, adding a billiard room and dining room to replace the stable block.

=== Charles Dickens ===
In 1848 Charles Dickens visited and stayed in Great Yarmouth while gathering material for his book David Copperfield and many of the town's buildings have their place in the book including the Star, which becomes the Inn where David and Steerforth stayed.

=== The Royal Mail ===
In 1819, the Star Tavern was the Yarmouth terminus for the royal mail coach, which left for London every day at 2:00 pm. By 1845, the tavern was also the terminus for mail for Birmingham, and a coach left for Leicester at 4:40 pm.

=== Demolition and re-location ===
In the 1920s the Star Tavern was owned and run by the Bayfield family. It was now known as the Star Hotel. In October 1930 The Star Hotel was put up for sale by the Bayfields. The building was sold for £1850.00 to the Postmaster General, to be demolished to make way for an extension to the telephone exchange which occupied the adjacent building to the South. Part of the buildings interior was sold by auction before the demolition of the building. The panelling and ceiling of one of the rooms, which was known as the Nelson room, were bought and removed and shipped to the Metropolitan Museum of Art in New York where they may be seen to this day.

=== Lord Horatio Nelson ===
Admiral Horatio Nelson often stayed in the Star Hotel and the room that he always had reserved for him became known as the Nelson room. It is the elaborately fixtures and fittings of this room which are now an exhibit at the Metropolitan Museum in New York.

=== Re-location ===
Following the demolition of this first hotel the Bayfields purchased the building next door. This building, called Stone House had also been built by a wealth merchant by the name of Anthony Ellys in 1764 on the site of a much older house. The Star Hotel's license was transferred to the new premise thus continuing the name. This new property also had many outstanding features such as rooms with fitted panels similar to the already described room's interior sold to the Metropolitan Museum of Art. Since 1881 Stone House had also been a hotel and was called the Cromwell Temperance Hotel. At the time of its sale in 1930 it had been owned by Mr Frank Woolsey. In 1946 further expansion to the hotel took place. Some cottages which stood to the rear of the hotel were acquired and became part of the hotel complex. The business, now called The Star Hotel Great Yarmouth (1930) Ltd was renamed the New Star Hotel. In 1946 the ownership changed hands again and now became part of Norfolk and Suffolk Hotels Ltd. In 1949 the cottages at the rear were demolished and the hotel was extended and improved. Once again the hotel was sold to Truman Hanbury Buxton and Co Ltd. In 2001 the hotel was taken over by Queens Moat Hotels Ltd and was refurbished and became part of the Elizabeth Hotel group. Unfortunately in 2009 the Elizabeth Hotel group went into administration. This led to the hotel being taken over by Brazile Ltd. Since 2010 the Hotel has been owned by Geraldine Thornton.

On 16 December 2015 it materialised the hotel had indeed closed and was in the process of being boarded up having been closed since Sunday.
