= Noritoshi Hirakawa =

Japanese artist and film producer

Noritoshi Hirakawa (平川 典俊, Hirakawa Noritoshi) (born 1960) is a Japanese contemporary artist, film maker, and film producer. Hirakawa works in a variety of media including photography, performance and installation. He was born in 1960 in Fukuoka, Japan and now lives and works in New York City.

Hirakawa's photographs are described as "erotic and intimate". Stating that "the sexual revolution is over and the Puritans won", Hirakawa's work challenges mainstream conceptions of sexuality, and the assumption that expressions of male heterosexual desire are oppressive and objectifying. His architectural photographs, unusually featuring prominent models, challenge the viewer to consider the meaning of architecture on modern urban life. In 2005, a site-specific performance entitled In Search of a Purple Heart, utilising fragments of interviews from Vietnam War veterans quoted by partially nude performers, was described as an "intense compilation of atmospheres" whose author was "intent on infecting the seductive surfaces that dominate our culture [...] with the rot of our culture’s collective guilt."

Noritoshi Hirakawa has exhibited his work in a variety of galleries, including the Museum of Contemporary Art, Tokyo, the Pompidou Centre, Paris, MoMA PS1 in New York City, multiple galleries in New York, Kunsthalle Wien in Vienna, the Art & Public Contemporary Art Gallery, Geneva, the Gallerie Ferdinand van Dieten in Amsterdam, the Christophe Guye Galerie in Zurich, and in Köln. He was invited to present his work at the SMAK, Ghent in Belgium during the group-exhibition “Casino 2001” and the Museum für Moderne Kunst in Frankfurt included the work “Dreams of Tokyo” in its permanent collection. Additional works by Hirakawa in permanent collections include: "Woman Children and Japanese" at The Sandretto Re Rebaudengo Art Collection, Turin, Italy, "Garden of Nirvana" at MOCA Los Angeles, and "Reconfirmation" at Hamburger Bahnhof Museum für Gegenwart, Berlin.
