= Protest! =

1942 Polish Holocaust protest leaflet

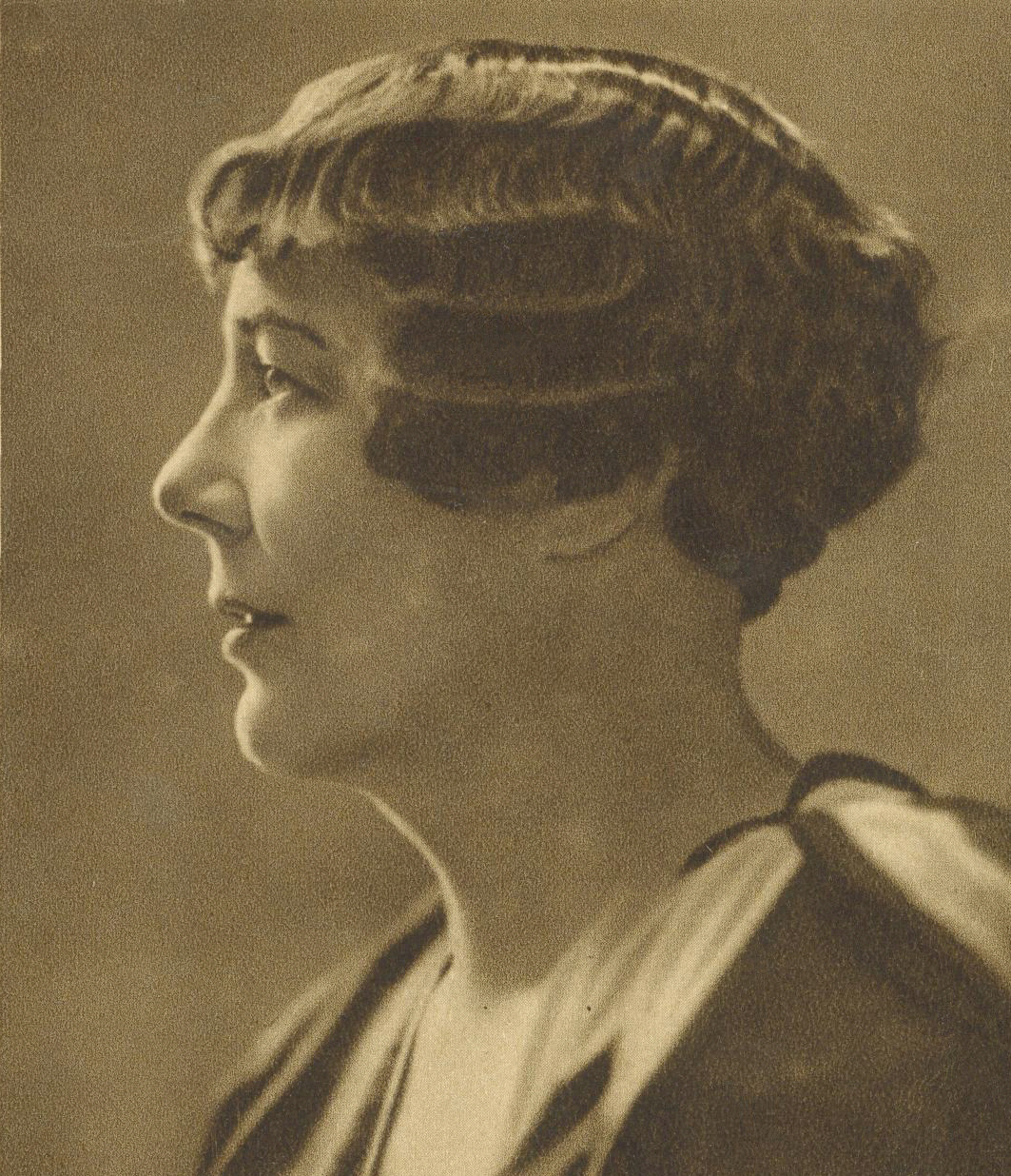
Zofia Kossak-Szczucka, author of Protest!; Polish writer and Catholic social activist; head of Front for the Rebirth of Poland

Protest! was a clandestine leaflet issued in 1942 as a protest by Polish Catholics against the mass murder of Jews in German-occupied Poland.

== History ==
Protest! was published on 28 August 1942 in Warsaw. It was signed by the Polish underground organization, Front for the Rebirth of Poland, which was a continuation of the prewar Catholic Action. Its president at the time was the Polish writer, Zofia Kossak-Szczucka. Protest! was clandestinely issued as a leaflet in 5,000 copies in Warsaw on 11 August 1942. It was published a few weeks after the start of the Germans' liquidation of the Warsaw Ghetto, from which – as part of Operation Reinhard – Jews were deported to the Treblinka extermination camp.

The world, Kossak-Szczucka wrote, was silent in the face of this atrocity. "England is silent, so is America, even the influential international Jewry, so sensitive in its reaction to any transgression against its people, is silent. Poland is silent... Dying Jews are surrounded only by a host of Pilates washing their hands in innocence." Those who are silent in the face of murder, she wrote, become accomplices to the crime. Kossak-Szczucka saw this largely as an issue of religious ethics. "Our feelings toward Jews have not changed," she wrote. "We do not stop thinking of them as political, economic and ideological enemies of Poland." But, she wrote, this does not relieve Polish Catholics of their duty to oppose the crimes being committed in their country.

We are required by God to protest," she wrote. "God who forbids us to kill. We are required by our Christian consciousness. Every human being has the right to be loved by his fellow men. The blood of the defenceless cries to heaven for revenge. Those who oppose our protest, are not Catholics.

We do not believe that Poland can benefit from German cruelties. On the contrary. ... We know how poisoned is the fruit of the crime. ... Those who do not understand this, and believe that a proud and free future for Poland can be combined with acceptance of the grief of their fellow men, are neither Catholics nor Poles.

== Reception ==
The protest was a big surprise for leftist circles and the Jews themselves, because Zofia Kossak was associated with Catholic national circles, which in the pre-war Poland were very reserved for Jews and criticized Jewish communities. This position was also clearly presented by the author in the content of her protest. After announcing her appeal, Kossak repeatedly published in the underground press appeals to Poles for help to the Jews. Her efforts led in September 1942 to establishing an organization helping Jews, the Provisional Committee to Aid Jews (Tymczasowy Komitet Pomocy Żydom), later transformed into the Council to Aid Jews (Rada Pomocy Żydom) - Żegota, an underground organization whose sole purpose was to save Jews in Poland from Nazi extermination. It was the only organization of this type in occupied Europe. Co-organizer was Wanda Krahelska, social activist of the Polish Socialist Party.

Kossak personally helped the Jews hiding on the "Aryan side" by supplying them with money and false documents. In 1943 she was arrested by the Germans and imprisoned in the German concentration camp Auschwitz-Birkenau, and later transferred to Pawiak prison, where she was sentenced to death. It was saved in 1944 thanks to the efforts of the Polish underground. For her contribution to saving Jews during World War II, she received posthumously in 1982 a medal and the title of Righteous Among the Nations by Yad Vashem.

Regarding Kossak-Szczucka's "Protest", Robert D. Cherry and Annamaria Orla-Bukowska wrote in the introduction to Rethinking Poles and Jews: "Without at all whitewashing her antisemitism in the document, she vehemently called for active intercession on behalf of the Jews - precisely in the name of Polish Roman Catholicism and Polish patriotism. The deportations from the Warsaw Ghetto precipitated her cofounding of Żegota that same year - an Armia Krajowa (AK, Home Army) unit whose sole purpose was to save Jews."

== Bibliography ==
- Wroński, Stanisław (1971). Polacy i Żydzi 1939–1945, (eng. "Poles and Jews" 1939-1945) (in Polish). Warsaw: Książka i Wiedza.
- Engel, David (2014). In the Shadow of Auschwitz: The Polish Government-in-exile and the Jews, 1939-1942. UNC Press Books. ISBN 9781469619576.
