= Władysław Bartoszewski =

Polish politician and activist (1922–2015)

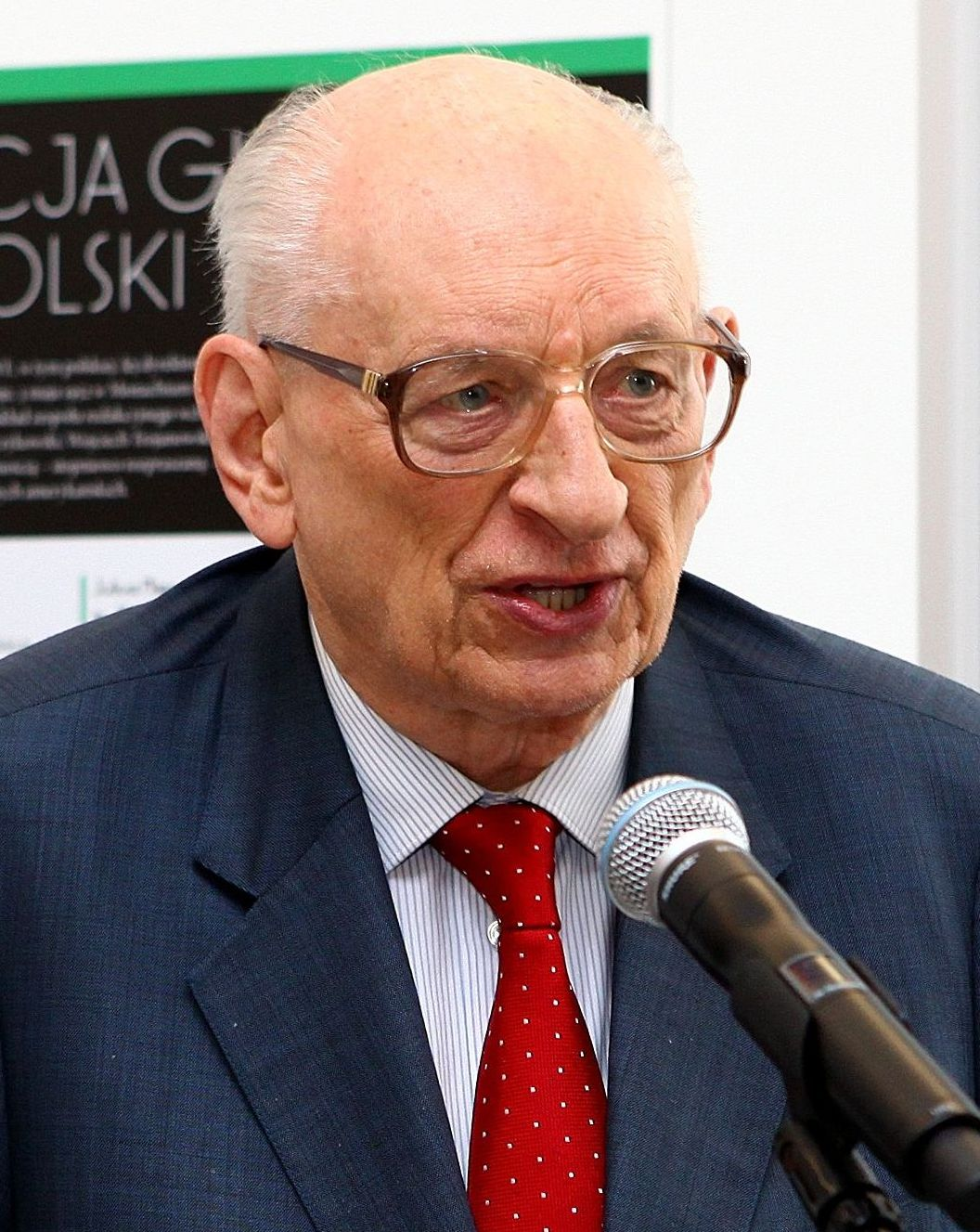
- Bartoszewski in 2012

Minister of Foreign Affairs
- In office 30 June 2000 – 19 October 2001
- President: Aleksander Kwaśniewski
- Prime Minister: Jerzy Buzek
- Preceded by: Bronisław Geremek
- Succeeded by: Włodzimierz Cimoszewicz
- In office 7 March 1995 – 22 December 1995
- President: Lech Wałęsa
- Prime Minister: Józef Oleksy
- Preceded by: Andrzej Olechowski
- Succeeded by: Dariusz Rosati

Ambassador of The Republic of Poland to Austria
- In office 20 September 1990 – 1 September 1995
- Preceded by: Stanisław Bejger
- Succeeded by: Jan Barcz

Personal details
- Born: 19 February 1922 Warsaw, Poland
- Died: 24 April 2015 (aged 93) Warsaw, Poland
- Cause of death: Myocardial infarction
- Spouse: Zofia Bartoszewska
- Children: Władysław Teofil Bartoszewski
- Occupation: Academician, journalist, politician, resistance member, social activist, writer

Władysław Bartoszewski (Polish: [vwaˈdɨswav bartɔˈʂɛfskʲi]; 19 February 1922 – 24 April 2015) was a Polish professor of History, politician, social activist, journalist, writer, historian and insurgent. A former Auschwitz concentration camp prisoner, he was a World War II resistance fighter as part of the Polish underground and participated in the Warsaw Uprising. After the war he was persecuted and imprisoned by the ruling Polish United Workers' Party (PZPR) of the Polish People's Republic regime due to his membership in the Home Army (Armia Krajowa, AK) and opposition activity.

After the Revolutions of 1989, Bartoszewski served twice as the Minister of Foreign Affairs of democratic Poland from March through December 1995 and again from 2000 to 2001. He was also an ambassador and a member of the Polish Senate. Bartoszewski was a close ally and friend of Solidarity leader and later president of Poland, Lech Wałęsa.

Bartoszewski was a chevalier of the Order of the White Eagle, an honorary citizen of Israel, and a member of the International Honorary Council of the European Academy of Diplomacy.

== Early life ==
Bartoszewski was born in Warsaw to a family of civil servants. He grew up on a street next to the Great Synagogue and a detention centre, later saying "“These two things, the synagogue and the penitentiary, later marked my life."

== World War II ==
In September 1939, Bartoszewski took part in the civil defense of Warsaw as a stretcher-bearer. From May 1940, he worked in the first social clinic of the Polish Red Cross in Warsaw. On 19 September 1940, Bartoszewski was detained in the Warsaw district of Żoliborz during a surprise round-up of members of the public (łapanka), along with some 2,000 civilians (among them, Witold Pilecki). From 22 September 1940, he was detained in Auschwitz concentration camp (his inmate number was 4427). Due to actions undertaken by the Polish Red Cross, he was released from Auschwitz on 8 April 1941.

=== Polish Underground State ===
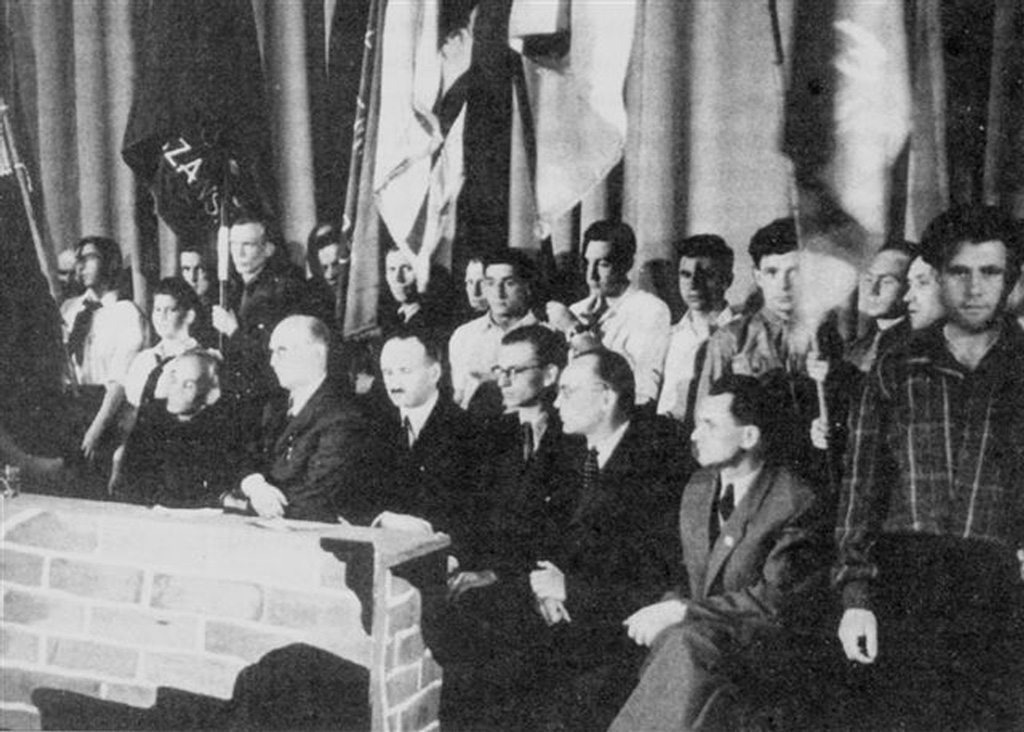
The third anniversary of the Warsaw Ghetto Uprising, the official gathering at the Polish Theatre in Warsaw, April 1946. On stage, among others, the activists of Żegota. Bartoszewski is sitting on the third right

After his release from Auschwitz, Bartoszewski contacted the Association of Armed Struggle (Związek Walki Zbrojnej). In the summer of 1941, he reported on his concentration camp imprisonment to the Information Department of the Information and Propaganda Bureau of the Home Army (Armia Krajowa, or AK, a reformed version of the Association of Armed Struggle and the largest resistance movement in Poland). In 1942, he joined the Front for the Rebirth of Poland (Front Odrodzenia Polski), which was a secret, Catholic, social-educational and charity organisation founded by Zofia Kossak-Szczucka. From October 1941 until 1944, Bartoszewski studied Polish studies in the secret Humanist Department of Warsaw University. At this time, higher education of Poles was outlawed by the German occupational authorities.

In August 1942, Bartoszewski became a soldier of the Home Army, working as a reporter in the "P" Subdivision of the Information Department of its Information and Propaganda Bureau. His pseudonym "Teofil" was inspired by Teofil Grodzicki, a fictional character from Jan Parandowski's novel entitled The Sky in Flames. He cooperated with Kazimierz Moczarski in the two-man P-1 report of the "P" subdivision.

From September 1942, Bartoszewski was active on behalf of the Front for the Rebirth of Poland in the Provisional Committee for Aid to Jews and its successor organisation, the Council for Aid to Jews (codenamed Żegota). Żegota, a Polish World War II resistance organisation whose objective was to help Jews during the Holocaust, operated under the auspices of the Polish Government in Exile through the Delegatura, its presence in Warsaw. He remained a member of Żegota until the Warsaw Uprising. In 1943, he replaced Witold Bieńkowski in the Jewish Department of the Delegatura.

From November 1942 to September 1943, Bartoszewski was an editorial team secretary of the Catholic magazine Prawda (The Truth), the press organ of the Front for the Rebirth of Poland. From fall of 1942 until spring of 1944, Bartoszewski was the editor-in-chief of the Catholic magazine Prawda Młodych (The Youth's Truth), which was also connected with the Front for the Rebirth of Poland and aimed at university and high-school students. In November 1942, Bartoszewski became a vice-manager of a division created in the Department of Internal Affairs of the Delegatura, whose remit was to help prisoners of Pawiak prison. In February 1943, Bartoszewski became a reporter and vice-manager of the Department's Jewish Report. As a part of his activities for Żegota and the Jewish Report, he organised assistance for the participants of the Warsaw Ghetto Uprising in April 1943.

On 1 August 1944, Bartoszewski began his participation in the Warsaw Uprising. He was an aide to the commander of radio post "Asma" and editor-in-chief of the magazine The News from the City and The Radio News. On 20 September, by orders from the commandant of the Warsaw District of the AK, General Antoni "Monter" Chruściel, Bartoszewski was decorated with the Silver Cross of Merit. This was the result of a proposal put forward by the chief of the Information and Propaganda Bureau in General Headquarters of the Home Army, Colonel Jan Rzepecki). On 1 October, he was appointed Second Lieutenant by the AK commander general Tadeusz "Bór" Komorowski (also due to a proposal by Rzepecki). He received the Cross of Valor order on 4 October.

=== Post-World War II ===
Bartoszewski left Warsaw on 7 October 1944. He continued his underground activity in the Information and Propaganda Bureau of the Home Army at its General Headquarters in Kraków. From November 1944 to January 1945, he held a position as editorial team secretary for Information Bulletin. At the end of February 1945, he returned to Warsaw, where he began his service in the information and propaganda section of NIE resistance movement. From May to August 1945, Bartoszewski was serving in the sixth unit of the Delegatura (he was responsible for information and propaganda) under the supervision of Kazimierz Moczarski). On 10 October 1945, he revealed that he had served in the AK.

In Autumn 1945, Bartoszewski started his cooperation with the Institute of National Remembrance at the presidium of the government and the Head Commission of Examination of German Crimes in Poland. His information gathered during the occupation period about the Nazi crimes, the situation in concentration camps and prisons, as well as his knowledge concerning the Jewish genocide, appeared to be very helpful.

In February 1946 he began his work in the editorial section of Gazeta Ludowa (People's Gazette), the main press organ of the Polish People's Party (Polskie Stronnictwo Ludowe, PSL). Soon, he joined the PSL, at that time the only influential party in opposition to the PZPR government. In the articles published in Gazeta Ludowa, he mentioned the outstanding figures of the Polish Underground State (the interview with Stefan Korboński, the report from the funeral of Jan Piekałkiewicz), and the events connected with the fight for liberation of the country (a series of sketches presenting the Warsaw Uprising entitled Dzień Walczącej Stolicy).

Due to his collaboration with the PSL, Bartoszewski became subject to repressions by the security services. On 15 November 1946, he was falsely accused of being a spy, resulting in him being arrested and held by the Ministry of Public Security of Poland. In December, he was transferred to the Mokotów Prison; he was released on 10 April 1948, with the help of Zofia Rudnicka (a former chief of Żegota, then working in the Ministry of Justice). Although Bartoszewski was accepted into the third year of Polish Studies in December 1948, his arrest in 1949 and the resulting five years' imprisonment rendered him unable to finish his studies.

Bartoszewski was again arrested on 14 December 1949. On 29 May 1952, he was sentenced by the Military District Court to eight years in prison due to the false charge of espionage. In April 1954, he was moved to the prison in Rawicz and in June to the prison in Racibórz. He was released in August 1954 on a year's parole due to his bad health condition. On 2 March 1955, during the wave of de-Stalinization, Bartoszewski was informed he was wrongly sentenced.

== Career ==
=== Literary, academic and journalistic activity ===
After Bartoszewski was found wrongly sentenced and released from prison, he returned to his journalistic activity. Since August 1955, he was the editor-in-chief of specialist publishing houses of the Polish Librarians Association. Since July 1956, he was publishing his articles in Stolica weekly, and since January 1957 he was a member of an editorial section. From the Summer of 1958 to December 1960, he held the position of the secretary of the editorial section. In August 1957, Bartoszewski began working with Tygodnik Powszechny (Universal Weekly). From July 1982, he was a member of the editorial section. In November 1958, Bartoszewski was again accepted by the Linguistic Department of Warsaw University, in extramural mode. He submitted his master's thesis written under the supervision of professor Julian Krzyżanowski. However, by decision of the vice-chancellor, he was expelled from the university in October 1962.

On 18 April 1963, Bartoszewski was decorated with the Polonia Restituta medal for his help to the Jews during the war. The proposal was put forward by the Jewish Historical Institute. Between September and November 1963, he resided in Israel at the invitation of the Yad Vashem Institute. In the name of the Council for Aid to Jews, he received the diploma of the Righteous Among the Nations. In 1966, he received the medal of the Righteous Among the Nations. In memoriam, former Israeli Ambassador Govrin would later write: "Władysław Bartoszewski will always be remembered as an individual who greatly contributed to the strengthening of Polish-Israeli ties, well before diplomatic ties were renewed and well after.

From November to December 1963, Bartoszewski lived in Austria, where he entered into communication with Austrian intellectual and political societies. In November 1963, he began his cooperation with Radio Free Europe. In the next years, he was traveling to the Federal Republic of Germany, Great Britain, Italy, Israel and the United States, where he got in touch mainly with some of the representatives of Polish emigration (among others with Jan Nowak-Jeziorański, Jan Karski, Czesław Miłosz and Gustaw Herling-Grudziński). In 1969–73, Bartoszewski served as the chairman of the Warsaw Department of the Society of Book Lovers (Towarzystwo Przyjaciół Książki) and in December 1969 he was appointed a member of the board of the Polish PEN. From 1972 to 1983, he served as the chief secretary of the Polish PEN. In 1973–82, and again in 1984–85, Bartoszewski lectured as a senior lecturer (the counterpart of vice-professor). His lectures concerned modern history (with the special emphasis on the war and occupation) in the Institute of Modern History on the Humanistic Science Department of KUL (Catholic University of Lublin). In December 1981, he was an active participant in the First Polish Culture Congress, which was interrupted by the enforcement of martial law in Poland.

In 1983–1984 and 1986–1988, Bartoszewski lectured at the Institute of Political Science Faculty of Social Sciences at LMU Munich (as well as the Media Science Institute at the same university in 1989–90). He was named Visiting Professor by the Bavarian government. In 1984, he received an honorary doctorate from Hebrew College in Baltimore (USA) as well as a certificate of the recognition from the American Jewish Committee in New York.

From May 1984, Bartoszewski was a full member of the Józef Piłsudski Institute of America. From 1986 he served as one of the deputy-chairmen at the Institute of Polish-Jewish Studies at the University of Oxford. In the academic year 1985 he was lecturing at the Faculty of History and Social Sciences at the Catholic University of Eichstätt-Ingolstadt in the Federal Republic of Germany. From 1988 to 1989, he lectured at the Institute of Political Science in the Department of Philosophy and Social Sciences at the University of Augsburg. In 1992 he was appointed a member of the Independent Commission of Experts (ICE) 1992–2002 which was set up by the Swiss parliament to examine the refugee policy of the Switzerland during World War II as well as economic and financial relationships between Switzerland and Nazi Germany. Bartoszewski took part in many international conferences and seminars dedicated to the issues of World War II, the Jewish genocide, Polish-German and Polish-Jewish relationships as well as the role of Polish intellectualists in politics. He delivered a number of lectures and reports on the various international forums.

=== Opposition activity ===
In 1970, due to his opposition activity and various relations in Western countries, Bartoszewski was forbidden to publish his works in Poland (until autumn 1974). He also fell victim to searches, denials of passport and distributing forgeries). In 1974, he was engaged in activity focusing on reprieving the convicted members of the Ruch organisation (among others Stefan Niesiołowski and Andrzej Czuma). In January 1976, as one of the first, Bartoszewski signed the letter of intellectualists protesting against the introduction of changes into the constitution of the People's Republic of Poland. He helped establish the Society for Educational Courses and he lectured at the "Flying University".

On 21 August 1980, Bartoszewski signed the intellectuals' letter to the protesting workers from the Polish coast. During 1980/1981 he was a member of Solidarity. After announcing martial law on 13 December 1981, he was a detainee in Białołęka prison and later in the Internment Center in Jaworze at Drawsko Pomorskie Military Training Area. He was released on 28 April 1982 due to the support from intellectual communities from Poland and from abroad.

In 1981, Edward Raczyński, the President of Poland in exile, proposed Bartoszewski as his successor so Bartoszewski could become president in exile after his resignation. Raczyński, according to his own words, wanted someone from the country and not the emigre circles as well as with strong ties to the opposition in Poland. Bartoszewski, however, graciously refused. In 1987 Raczyński's final successor, Kazimierz Sabbat, also proposed Batoszewski be nominated, but he declined. Had he accepted the position, he would have succeeded Sabbat after his sudden death in 1989.

=== Third Republic of Poland ===
==== Diplomatic and political activity ====
From September 1990 to March 1995, Bartoszewski held the position of Ambassador of the Polish Republic to Austria. On 28 April 1995, he delivered a speech during the solemn joint session of the Bundestag and Bundesrat on the occasion of the 50th anniversary of the ending of World War II as the only foreign speaker. On 22 December 1995, he resigned from his office due to the end of Lech Wałęsa's presidential term. Once again, Bartoszewski became chief of Polish Internal Affairs in June 2000 in Jerzy Buzek's government. From 1997 to 2001, he was the Senator of the fourth term and the chairperson in the Office for International Affairs and European Integration. As a Senior Speaker he chaired the inaugural session of the Senate of the Republic of Poland. On 21 November 2007, Bartoszewski was named Secretary of State in the Office of the Chairman of the Council of Ministers (Prime Minister Donald Tusk) and plenipotentiary for international affairs.

==== Social and academic activity ====
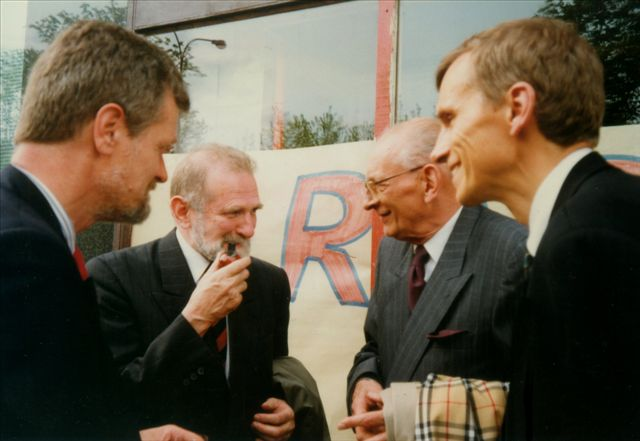
Bartoszewski (right, background) with Bronisław Geremek (left, background), 1997

From June 1990, Bartoszewski was chairperson of the International Council of the National Auschwitz Museum. From 1991 to 1995, he was the member of the National Council for Polish-Jewish Relations from the presidential office. From March 1995, he was the deputy chairman of the Polish PEN. In 1996, he received an honorary doctorate of the University of Wrocław.

Starting in June 2001, Bartoszewski was the leader of the Council for the Protection of Memory of Combat and Martyrdom. On 27 January 2005, on the occasion of the 60th anniversary of the liberation of the concentration camp Auschwitz-Birkenau, he delivered speeches as the representative of the Polish inmates of concentration camps. For many years he was a strong supporter of the Polish-Jewish and Polish-German reconciliation. Through his journalistic and academic activity he contributed to retaining the memory of the Polish Underground State, the Warsaw Uprising and the crimes of totalitarianism.

From 26 January to 29 June 2006, Bartoszewski headed the board of LOT Polish Airlines. He was a member of the Polish Writers' Association. He was also chairperson of the Polish Institute of International Affairs in Warsaw, but resigned from the position on 29 August 2006. The reason was that there was no reaction from then-Minister of Foreign Affairs Anna Fotyga to the accusations formulated by deputy Minister of Defense Antoni Macierewicz who alleged that most of hitherto Ministers of Foreign Affairs of the Third Republic of Poland were former agents of the Soviet special services according to files known as "fałszywkas" produced by the SB secret police.

Bartoszewski's scholarly credentials were controversial. He had no university degree but used the title of "professor", suggesting that he had an academic degree. After objections from the German and Polish academic communities, the German Ministry of Foreign Affairs removed the title of "professor" before Bartoszewski's name from its web page. Despite his lack of formal academic qualifications, Bartoszewski taught graduate-level history courses at several accredited and prestigious universities, including the renowned KUL (John Paul II Catholic University of Lublin), which lists Bartoszewski as a reader in modern history (and chair of Polish Postwar History) in the Faculty of Humanities, 1973–1985, and awarded him an honorary doctorate in 2008. From April 2009 he was a council member of the Auschwitz-Birkenau Foundation. In July 2010 he became a member of the International Council of the Austrian Service Abroad.

At a joint conference of the Polish Institute of International Affairs (PISM) and the Israel Council on Foreign Relations (ICFR) held in Warsaw in November 2017, ICFR director Laurence Weinbaum paid tribute to Bartoszewski and said he had played an important role in developing relations between Poland and Israel: "At a time when in certain quarters we are witness to shameless opportunism and the grotesque obfuscation of history, his legacy resonates especially strongly. Bartoszewski taught people that bellicose jingoism and intolerance should not be confused with the true love of one's country and that a society that gives way to its basest instincts is doomed to ruin."

== Personal life ==
Władysław Bartoszewski was first married to Antonina Mijal, but that marriage ended in divorce. He later married Zofia Bartoszewska in 1967; they remained married until his death in 2015. His son, Władysław Teofil Bartoszewski, was born in 1955. He is an academic historian who has written on Polish Jewish history. He is the author of the 1991 book, The Convent at Auschwitz, George Braziller, ISBN 0-8076-1267-7.

On 24 April 2015, Bartoszewski was admitted to a Warsaw hospital, dying shortly after arrival of a heart attack, aged 93. Flags at the parliament were lowered to half-staff in Bartoszewski's honor. Bartoszewski was survived by wife Zofia and son Władysław Teofil. Bartoszewski's funeral was on 4 May and was buried at Powązki Military Cemetery.

== Publications ==
=== English ===
- 1968 Warsaw Death Ring: 1939–1944, Interpres.
- 1969 Righteous Among Nations: How Poles Helped the Jews 1939–1945, ed. with Zofia Lewin, Earlscourt Pub, UK;, ISBN 0-333-42378-X.
- 1970 The Samaritans: Heroes of the Holocaust, ed. with Zofia Lewin, Twayne Publishers, New York.
- 1988 The Warsaw Ghetto: A Christian's Testimony, Beacon Press; ISBN 0-8070-5602-2.
- 1991 The Jews in Warsaw: A History, ed. with Antony Polonsky, Blackwell Publishing; ISBN 1-55786-213-3.

=== Polish ===
- Konspiracyjne Varsaviana poetyckie 1939–1944: zarys informacyjny (Warsaw 1962)
- Organizacja małego sabotażu "Wawer" w Warszawie (1940–1944) (1966)
- Ten jest z Ojczyzny mojej. Polacy z pomocą Żydom 1939–1945 (oprac. wspólnie z Zofią Lewinówną; Znak 1967, 1969)
- Warszawski pierścień śmierci 1939–1944 (1967, 1970; ponadto wydania w języku angielskim 1968 i niemieckim 1970)
- Kronika wydarzeń w Warszawie 1939–1949 (oprac.; wespół z Bogdanem Brzezińskim i Leszkiem Moczulskim; Państwowe Wydawnictwo Naukowe 1970)
- Ludność cywilna w Powstaniu Warszawskim. Prasa, druki ulotne i inne publikacje powstańcze t. I-III (oprac.; praca zbiorowa; Państwowy Instytut Wydawniczy 1974)
- 1859 dni Warszawy (introduction by Aleksander Gieysztor; bibliography of W. Bartoszewski by Zofia Steczowicz-Sajderowa; index by Zofia Bartoszewska; Znak 1974; 2nd edition expanded: 1984, ISBN 83-7006-152-4)
- Polskie Państwo Podziemne (inauguracyjny wykład TKN wygłoszony w Warszawie 2 XI 1979; II obieg; Niezależna Oficyna Wydawnicza NOWa 1979, 1980; OW "Solidarność" MKZ, Wrocław 1981; Komitet Wyzwolenia Społecznego 1981; Agencja Informacyjna Solidarności Walczącej, Lublin 1985)
- Los Żydów Warszawy 1939–1943. W czterdziestą rocznicę powstania w getcie warszawskim (Puls, Londyn 1983; Bez Cięć 1985 [II obieg]; Międzyzakładowa Struktura "Solidarności" 1985 [II obieg]; wydanie 2 poprawione i rozszerzone: Puls 1988, ISBN 0-907587-38-0; Fakt, Łódź 1989 [II obieg])
- Jesień nadziei: warto być przyzwoitym (II obieg; tł. z wydania zach.-niem.; posłowie Reinholda Lehmanna; [Lublin]: Spotkania 1984, 1986)
- Dni walczącej stolicy. Kronika Powstania Warszawskiego (Aneks, Londyn 1984; Krąg, Warsaw 1984 [II obieg]; Alfa 1989, ISBN 83-7001-283-3; Świat Książki 2004, ISBN 83-7391-679-2)
- Metody i praktyki Bezpieki w pierwszym dziesięcioleciu PRL (pod pseud. Jan Kowalski; II obieg; Grupy Polityczne "Wola", Ogólnopolski Komitet Oporu Robotników "Solidarność" 1985; Biuletyn Łódzki 1985; Apel 1986; Rota 1986)
- Syndykat zbrodni (pod pseudonimem "ZZZ"; 1986)
- Na drodze do niepodległości (Editions Spotkania, Paryż 1987, OCLC 21299072)
- Warto być przyzwoitym. szkic do pamiętnika (II obieg; CDN 1988)
- Warto być przyzwoitym. Teksty osobiste i nieosobiste (Polskie tłumaczenie książki pt.: Herbst der Hoffnungen: es lohnt sich, anständig zu sein; Wydawnictwo Polskiej Prowincji Dominikanów W drodze 1990, ISBN 83-7033-104-1; wydanie 2 zmienione: 2005, ISBN 83-7033-545-4)
- Ponad podziałami. Wybrane przemówienia i wywiady – lipiec-grudzień 2000 (Ministerstwo Spraw Zagranicznych 2001, ISBN 83-907665-7-4)
- Wspólna europejska odpowiedzialność. Wybrane przemówienia i wywiady, styczeń-lipiec 2001 (Ministerstwo Spraw Zagranicznych 2001, ISBN 83-915698-1-0)
- Moja Jerozolima, mój Izrael. Władysław Bartoszewski w rozmowie z Joanną Szwedowską (posłowie: Andrzej Paczkowski; Rosner i Wspólnicy 2005, ISBN 83-89217-66-X)
- Władysław Bartoszewski: wywiad-rzeka (rozmowy z Michałem Komarem; Świat Książki 2006, ISBN 83-247-0441-8)
- Dziennik z internowania. Jaworze 15 December 1981 – 19 April 1982 (Świat Książki 2006)
- Pisma wybrane 1942–1957, Tom I (Universitas 2007, ISBN 978-83-242-0698-8)

=== German ===
- Die polnische Untergrundpresse in den Jahren 1939 bis 1945 (Druckerei und Verlagsanstalt, Konstanz 1967)
- Das Warschauer Ghetto wie es wirklich war. Zeugenbericht eines Christen (1983; also American and English edition)
- Herbst der Hoffnungen: Es lohnt sich, anständig zu sein (Herder 1983; ISBN 3-451-19958-0; 1984, ISBN 3-451-19958-0; 1986, ISBN 3-451-19958-0)
- Aus der Geschichte lernen? Aufsätze und Reden zur Kriegs- und Nachkriegsgeschichte Polens (foreword: Stanisław Lem; Deutscher Taschenbuch Verlag, Munich 1986)
- Uns eint vergossenes Blut. Juden und Polen in der Zeit der Endlösung (1987)
- Polen und Juden in der Zeit der "Endlösung" (Informationszentrum im Dienste der christlich-jüdischen Verständigung, Vienna 1990; ISBN 0-919581-32-3)
- Kein Frieden ohne Freiheit. Betrachtungen eines Zeitzeugen am Ende des Jahrhunderts (2000)
- Und reiß uns den Hass aus der Seele (Deutsch-Polnischer Verlag 2005; ISBN 83-86653-18-3)

== Awards and honors ==
1944: Silver Cross of Merit with Swords and the Cross of Valor
1963: Knight's Cross of the Polonia Restituta
1965: Righteous Among the Nations
1981: Honorary doctorate from the University of London
1983: Herder Prize, Vienna
1984: Honorary doctorate from the University of Baltimore
1986: Peace Prize of the German Book Trade
1986: Commander's Cross with Star of the Polonia Restituta
1992: Austrian Cross of Honour for Science and Art, 1st class
1995: Knight of the Order of the White Eagle
1995: Grand Decoration of Honour in Gold with Sash for Services to the Republic of Austria (Großes Goldenes Ehrenzeichen am Bande)
1996: Heinrich Heine Prize of the city of Düsseldorf
1997: Grand Cross with Star of Merit of the Federal Republic of Germany
2001: Grand Cross of Merit of the Federal Republic of Germany – "For work of reconciliation between Poles, Germans and Jews"
2006: Knight Grand Cross of the Order of St. Gregory the Great (Holy See; the highest papal award given to lay people)
2006: Knight of Freedom Award
2007: Jan Nowak-Jezioranski Prize of the Embassy of the USA
June 2007: International Adalbert Prize in Bratislava
2008: Prize of €15,000 – first European Civil Rights Prize of the Sinti and Roma
2009: Commander of the Legion of Honor (France)
2009: "Bene Merito" honorary distinction (Poland)
2012: Order of the White Double Cross, 2nd class
2013: Elie Wiesel Award
2015: Honorary citizen of Israel
