= Jerzy Makowiecki =

Polish engineer

Jerzy Zdzisław Makowiecki
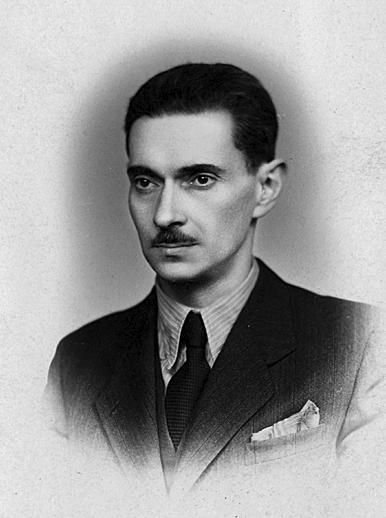
- Born: 23 January 1896; Warsaw
- Died: 13 June 1944 (aged 48); Górce
- Cause of death: Murder
- Spouse: Zofia Makowiecka née Neumann
- Military career
- Rank: Major
- Awards: Cross of Valour; Gold Cross of Merit with Swords

Jerzy Zdzisław Makowiecki, alias Tomasz Malicki, Wokulski, Tomasz, Dołęga, Kuncewicz (23 January 1896 – 13 June 1944) was a Polish engineer, member of the Polish Underground State (1939-1944), head of the Bureau of Information and Propaganda of the ZWZ-AK, chairman of the Alliance of Democrats (1943-1944).

== Biography ==
Jerzy Makowiecki was born in Warsaw in the family of engineer Henryk Dołęga-Makowiecki and Bronisława née Rosenfeld. After graduating from high school in 1913, he began his studies at the faculty of chemistry of the University of Warsaw. He then studied architecture at the Warsaw Polytechnic. During World War I, he belonged to the Polish Military Organization. He was arrested for his conspiratorial activities and imprisoned in the Warsaw Citadel in 1918. After Poland regained its independence, he joined the Polish Army, where he was active in intelligence. In 1926 he was transferred to the reserves. In 1933, he graduated with a degree in architecture. As an architect, he designed, among other things, defensive fortifications and military facilities for the Polish Navy.

He also became politically involved. In 1937 he participated in the founding of the anti-fascist Democratic Club in Warsaw. In 1938, the Democratic Clubs established a party – the Alliance of Democrats (SD), Makowiecki became vice-president of the party's executive board a year later. He took part in the defensive war against the German invasion in 1939. During the occupation period, he was active in the underground. He was an organizer and head of the Information Department of the Bureau of Information and Propaganda (BiP) of the Home Army Headquarters. He gathered there academics and intellectuals with similar democratic beliefs. He was also a co-founder of the Żegota Council to Aid Jews.

Toward the end of 1943, with the approach of Soviet troops to Polish lands and the development of the Communist underground – the Polish Workers' Party and its armed arm, the People's Guard – fear of the penetration of the organization by Soviet agents began to spread in the ranks of the Home Army. The Bureau of Information and Propaganda, as a gathering of people with leftist views, often extreme, many of Jewish origins, was typified as the most vulnerable. Its members began to be screened not only by the counterintelligence of the Warsaw District of the Home Army, but also by the counterintelligence of the National Armed Forces. Jerzy Makowiecki, as chairman of the SD, who did not hide his views, became one of the main suspects. In the spring of 1944, Makowiecki published a text in the magazine "Nowe Drogi" (lit. 'New Ways', the official organ of the SD) in which he advocated a revision of the attitude towards the USSR and the relinquishment of part of the eastern lands. The article only added to the suspicion. Counterintelligence reports also listed Ludwik Widerszal, Tadeusz Manteuffel, Tadeusz Kotarbiński, Stanisław Płoski, and even the head of the BiP, Jan Rzepecki, and his deputy Tadeusz Wardejn-Zagórski, as possible communist agents.

On June 13, 1944, he and his wife Zofia were kidnapped and murdered by members of the "Andrzej Sudeczko" diversionary unit affiliated with Home Army counterintelligence near the village of Górce )now part of the Bemowo district in Warsaw). The decision to murder Makowcki and Widerszal was made by three members of the underground: Władysław Jamontt, Witold Bieńkowski and Władysław Niedenthal. Bieńkowski was an important member of the Government Delegation for Poland. Affiliated with the Catholic milieu of the Front for the Rebirth of Poland, he worked in the Department of Internal Affairs in a cell dedicated to helping the imprisoned. In February 1943, he organized a Jewish affairs cell at the Delegation. It is not clear how big his role was in the killing of Widerszal and the Makowskis, certainly he was the one who gave the exact address of Makowiecki and his description. Jamontt was a member of the counterintelligence of the Second Department of the Home Army Headquarters, and before that an activist of the ultra-nationalist ONR, and already during the war affiliated with the nationalist organization "Pobudka." In the Home Army, he was mainly involved in screeing national organizations, mainly of national minorities, but also Polish ones, and for this reason had close contacts with the NSZ. Władysław Niedenthal came from syndicalist organizations; in the Home Army he worked in intelligence or counterintelligence. Niedenthal did not survive the war, he died during the Warsaw Uprising. His role in the case is unclear. Nothing certain is known about the other participants in the conspiracy, and the motives that drove the three to murder BiP activists are also not entirely clear. According to Janusz Marszalec, the perpetrators were probably convinced of the secret activity of the victims, their contacts with Communists, but they also wanted to shake up the underground, bring about internal changes and strengthen structures.

The news of the murder shocked the BiP circle. Friends of the assassinated, above all Kazimierz Moczarski and Aleksander Gieysztor, made an attempt to find the perpetrators. Moczarski, who at the time held a high position in the Directorate of Underground Struggle, quickly determined that the murder was carried out by the people of "Andrzej Sudeczko." They decided to kidnap the group's commander, which was to be carried out by Stanisław Sękowski "Rugia". However, the entire action was blocked by Jan Rzepecki. A separate investigation was carried out by the counterintelligence of the Home Army Headquarters, through its chief Bernard Zakrzewski "Oskar," and later by Stanisław Leszczyński "Vigil." Also involved in the investigation was Mieszysław Skolimowski of the counterintelligence of the Second Department of the Warsaw District of the Home Army. Investigators have determined that the murder was carried out by the "Andrzej Sudeczko" unit, but have not determined the names of the instigators. Andrzej Popławski "Andrzej Sudeczko" himself was killed on July 5, 1944 by his own soldiers in the Powązki cemetery. These men were Kedyw soldiers of the Mińsk Mazowiecki District Command of the Home Army. They had joined the unit in order to reckon with "Andrzej Sudeczko" carrying out expropriation actions in their district.

Historians Mariusz Olczak and Marek Strok have proposed an alternative version of events. In their view, the murders of Makowieckis and Widerszal should be separated. While the second was certainly carried out by the "Sudeczko" unit, the Makowiecki family was murdered by officers of the Polish Criminal Police, who blackmailed "Karwid," an AK officer of Jewish origin. "Karwid" allegedly give them the name and address of Jerzy Makowiecki in order to save himself. The authors found Makowiecki's reports written shortly before his death, in which he reported the threat from Polish Criminal Police to the Directorate of Underground Struggle. Historian Janusz Marszalec assessed the finding of the new documents as valuable, but rejected the authors' main thesis as not having a strong source basis.

The question of Makowiecki's possible cooperation is considered unlikely by historians today, but not completely ruled out. There were certainly Soviet agents in the SD, as secret information was leaking out precisely from this environment. A Soviet agents were Włodzimierz Lechowicz, Zygmunt Ziółek, and others.

== Bibliography ==
- Marszalec, Janusz (2006). "Morderstwo na Makowieckich i Widerszalu. Stara sprawa, nowe pytania, nowe wątpliwości" [Murder on Makowieckis and Widerszal. Old case, new questions, new doubts]. Zagłada Żydów. Studia i Materiały. 2.
