= Provisional Committee to Aid Jews =

The Provisional Committee to Aid Jews (Polish: Tymczasowy Komitet Pomocy Żydom) was founded on September 27, 1942, by Zofia Kossak-Szczucka and Wanda Krahelska-Filipowicz. The founding body consisted of Polish democratic Catholic activists associated with the Front Odrodzenia Polski, Polska Organizacja Demokratyczna (Polish Democratic Organization), Związek Syndykalistów Polskich (Union of Polish Syndicalists) and PPS-WRN. The codename for the organization was "Konrad Żegota Committee" and the same codename was retained for the direct successor, the underground Council to Aid Jews (Polish: Rada Pomocy Żydom).

The Provisional Committee was helping 180 persons already within a short period following its creation. It was financed partly by the Department of Social Services (Departament Opieki Społecznej) and the Department of Internal Affairs (Departament Spraw Wewnętrznych) of the Polish Government in Exile.

The Provisional Committee may have been the first formal institution in modern Polish history to be operated in an atmosphere of mutual trust by Polish and Jewish organizations of a broad political and socioeconomic spectrum. One of its vice-presidents was a member of Bund, Leon Feiner. Its secretary was Adolf Berman, who represented Zionist organizations.

One of the better-known Polish members of the Provisional Committee was professor Władysław Bartoszewski, who would later serve as Poland's Minister of Foreign Affairs in 1995 and again in 2000-2001. Other members included Anna Maria Lasocka, wife of the President of the Polish Landowners Association, and social democrat Czesława Wojeńska.

The Provisional Committee comprised Polish underground organizations that recognized the authority of the Government in Exile. Hence it did not include the communist Polish Workers' Party (PPR), which provided similar aid to Jews.

The successor to the Provisional Committee to Aid Jews was Council to Aid Jews, founded in December 1942.

== See also ==
- Holocaust in Poland
- Żegota
- History of Poland (1939–1945)
