= Żegota Monument =

Monument in Warsaw, Poland

Coordinates: 52°14′58.1″N 20°59′38.8″E

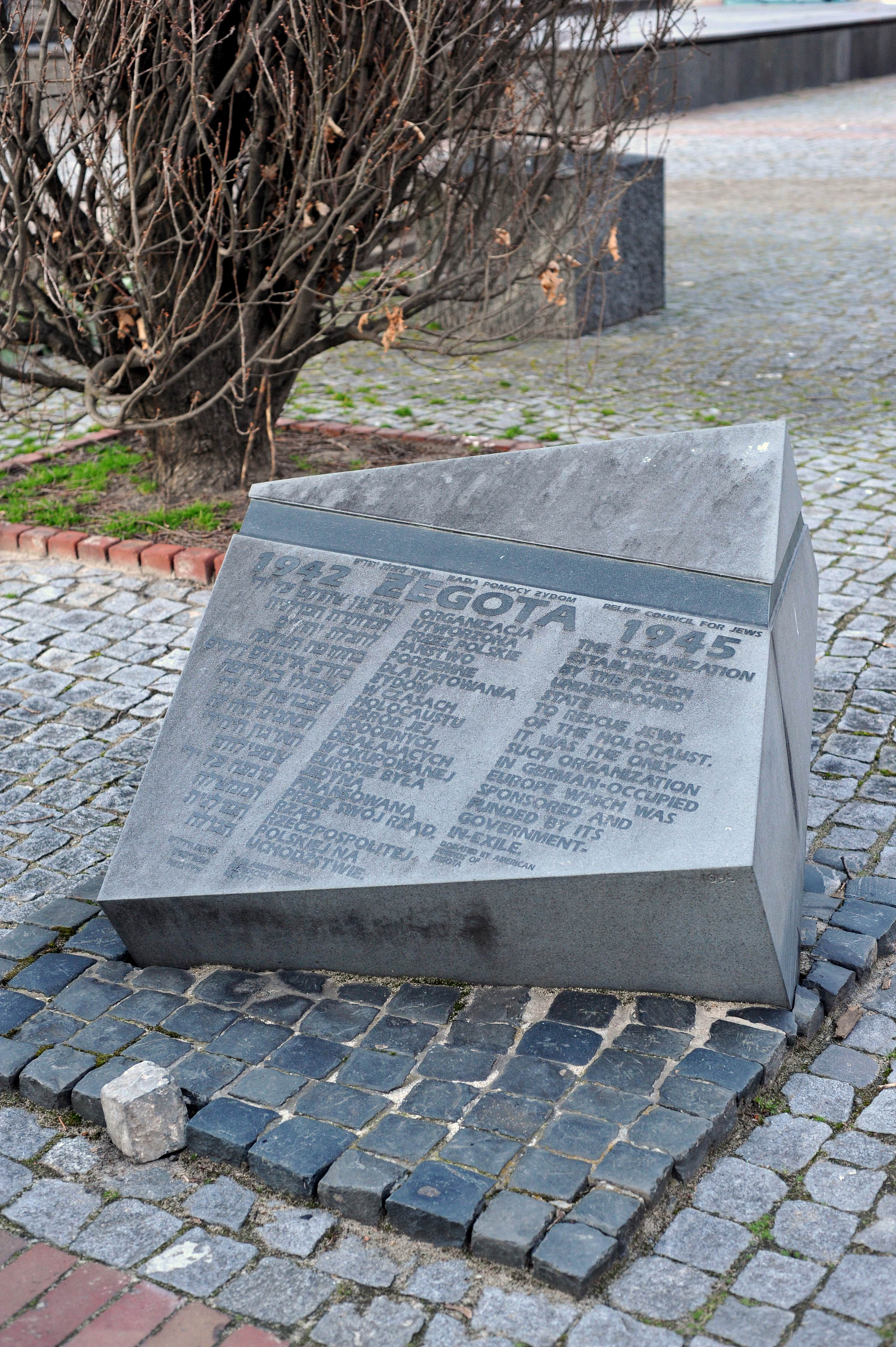
The Żegota Monument

The Żegota Monument is a stone monument dedicated to the Żegota organization, which rescued Jews during the Holocaust in Poland. It is on Anielewicza Street in the Muranów neighborhood of Warsaw, Poland, near the Monument to the Ghetto Heroes and the POLIN Museum of the History of Polish Jews.

== Description ==
The monument has an inscription in three languages (Hebrew, Polish and English) summarizing the story of Żegota (the organization is also known as the Council to Aid Jews with the Government Delegation for Poland). The inscription reads: "Relief Council For Jews 1942 Żegota 1945. The organization established by the Polish Underground State to rescue Jews of the Holocaust. It was the only such organization in German-occupied Europe which was sponsored and funded by its government-in-exile."

== Unveiling ==
The monument, financed by the American Polonia, was designed by architects Hanna Szmalenberg and Marek Moderau. It was unveiled on 27 September 1995 by Władysław Bartoszewski, at that time the last surviving member of Żegota. During the opening ceremony, prayers were offered by Warsaw Chief Rabbi Pinchas Menachem Joskowicz and Bishop Stanislaw Gadecki. Other attendees included the ambassadors of Israel and the United States, and Polish-Jewish activist Arnold Mostowicz.

The monument was placed next to an oak tree, planted in 1988 to commemorate the 45th anniversary of the Warsaw Ghetto Uprising.

During commemorations and events related to the remembrance of the rescue of Jews during Holocaust in Poland, flowers are laid at the monument.

== See also ==
- Survivors' Park in Łódź, home to another monument dedicated to Żegota.
