= Ferdynand =

Ferdynand is a Polish variant of the Germanic name Ferdinand. Ferdynand means "bold protector".

== People named Ferdynand ==
Ferdynand is a given name. Notable people with the name include:

- Ferdynand Antoni Ossendowski (1876–1945), Polish writer, journalist, traveller, explorer and university professor
- Ferdynand Arczyński (1900–1979), founding member of Żegota in German-occupied Poland (1942–1945)
- Ferdynand Radziwiłł (1834–1926), Polish nobleman and Polish-German politician
- Ferdynand Ruszczyc (1870–1936), Polish painter, printmaker, and stage designer
- Ferdynand Zarzycki (1888–1958), Polish general and politician
- Karol Ferdynand Vasa (1613–1655), Prince-Bishop of Breslau/Wrocław, bishop of Płock and Duke of Oppeln Opole
- Stanisław Ferdynand Rzewuski (1737–1786), Polish noble (szlachcic)

== See also ==
- Ferdinand
