= Anna Szatkowska =

Polish Resistance first-aider

Anna Szatkowska (15 March 1928 – 27 February 2015) was a World War II member of the Polish Home Army which she joined at the age of 16 to help in liberating Warsaw from German occupation. She served as first-aider. Sixty years later, she described her experiences in a book, La Maison brulée.

== Biography ==
Anna Szatkowska was the daughter of Roman Catholic writer and resistance fighter Zofia Kossak-Szczucka, the granddaughter of activist Tadeusz Kossak, who was the twin brother of painter Wojciech Kossak, and the great-granddaughter of painter Juliusz Kossak. In Górki, at Poland's southern frontier, she lived with her brothers, parents and grandparents in a manor house in relative affluence. The situation changed dramatically when World War II began on 1 September 1939 and the family had to leave Górki in search for a safe haven.

Initially, Szatkowska continued her schooling in a boarding-school for girls, but in 1944, aged 16, she signed up with the Polish underground army, and she was accepted into the Ewa-Maria patrol, which consisted of seven young girls, first-aiders. The Warsaw Uprising started on 1 August 1944, and lasted for 63 days until crushed by the Germans - while the Red Army stood waiting on the other side of the Vistula river.

In October 1944, Szatkowska began writing down her experiences from memory, together with Ewa Orlikowska, the former head of her patrol. Sixty years later, these notes served as a basis of her commemorative book. After the end of the War, a communist regime began to establish itself in Poland under Soviet supremacy. In June 1945, Zofia Kossak was called in for an interview by the new Polish Minister of the Interior, who was Jewish. She anticipated the worst, but he advised her strongly to leave the country immediately for her own protection as he knew what the government would do to anti-communists. He also knew from his brother, Adolf Berman, what Zofia had done personally and through Żegota, to save the lives of thousands of Jews, and so he saved Zofia and Anna.

Anna Szatkowska began her university education in Ireland and finished it in Fribourg, Switzerland. She became a teacher. In 1951, she married Jean-Marie Rosset, a Swiss national; they had four children. Rosset died in 1960, in a traffic accident. In 1971, she married Jean Bugnon. She is now known as Anna Rosset-Bugnon. They lived in Cugy, Fribourg.

For decades, she chose not to talk about her wartime experiences. However the insistent questions of her grandchildren convinced her finally to write her memories down in French. Later she translated her book into Polish. The book starts before World War II; it has a day-by-day account of the Warsaw Uprising and finishes in the 1960s.
