= Irena Sawicka =

Polish archaeologist and ethnographer

Irena Scheur-Sawicka (August 18, 1890 – August 1 or 4, 1944) was a Polish archaeologist, ethnographer, and educational and communist activist. During World War II she joined the Polish Workers' Party. She was active in the Polish resistance during World War II and, together with Żegota, in helping Jewish refugees from the Warsaw Ghetto. She died in the Warsaw Uprising.

== Biography ==
Scheur-Sawicka was born in Gucin, Ostrołęka County in a family of Polish landed gentry. Her father, Jan Scheur, was a French émigré from Alsace; her mother was Maria née Włodarkiewicz. She studied with private tutors and in small courses organized for women in Kraków and Warsaw. She quickly became engaged in educational activism, teaching street children. From 1915 she was married to archaeologist Ludwik Sawicki. They had no children.

By the end of World War I, in 1916, after failing to return from Minsk to Warsaw, she and her husband found jobs in Polish-expat organizations in Moscow and later engaged in archaeological expeditions in the Far East, (including Harbin in 1916–1918). After returning to newly independent Poland in 1918, she was active in organizations providing education to adults and accompanied her husband in his archaeological research, taking several courses in archaeology offered by the Warsaw Scientific Society. From the early 1920s she worked as a conservator-restorer for the Polish government and published several scientific articles. From 1922 to 1927 she was also a secretary of the Polish Prehistorical Society (Polskie Towarzystwo Prehistoryczne).

In the late 1920s her focus shifted from archaeology to education. She was involved in a number of organizations and institutions focused on adult education, such as the Institute for the Education of Adults (Instytut Oświaty Dorosłych) and the 3rd Center of the Education for the Adults (III Ognisko Oświaty Dorosłych).

In the 1930s she became involved with the work of the Communist Party of Poland. Following the German invasion of Poland, she became active in the non-violent Polish resistance efforts, such as the underground education and rescue of Jews (from the Warsaw Ghetto). She has been described by Adolf Berman as a prominent member of Żegota. In 1942, she joined the newly founded Polish Workers' Party, where she was a high-ranking official in the Żoliborz and Mokotów districts and active in providing supplies to the partisans of Armia Ludowa.

She died in the first days of the Warsaw Uprising, killed by stray German gunfire; her date of death is given as either August 1 or August 4.
