= Zofia Rudnicka =

Polish lawyer and judge

Zofia Rudnicka (1907 - 7 February 1981 in Warsaw) was a Polish lawyer and judge, social activist, and member of the Council for Aid to Jews at the Government Delegation for the Country "Żegota". After the war, she worked in the judiciary, for twenty years (until 1969) she was the chairman of the Civil and Audit Department of the Provincial Court for the Capital City of Warsaw.
