= Henryk Woliński =

Polish partisan (1901–1986)

- Born: 1901
- Died: 1986 (aged 84–85)
- Other names: „Wacław”, „Zakrzewski”
- Occupations: colonel of Armia Krajowa, lawyer
- Honours: Righteous Among the Nations Commander of the Order of Polonia Restituta

Henryk Woliński (1901–1986) was a member of the Polish resistance movement in World War II, specifically the Armia Krajowa (AK), where he reached the rank of colonel. He was the head of the "Jewish Department" in AK's Bureau of Information and Propaganda. His codename was "Wacław". He was recognized by Yad Vashem as one of the Righteous among the Nations. He himself harbored in his apartment over 25 Jews for a period going from a few days to several weeks.

== Life ==
Woliński was a lawyer in the Warsaw administration before the Germans invasion of Poland in September 1939. He had a Jewish wife and many Jewish associates and friends, many of them from the Polish Bar Association, he was in contact with the Jewish intelligentsia involved in the administration of the ghetto and he quickly got involved with the support for the Jews organized by the Poles.

=== World War II ===
Polish underground got organized much quicker than the first Jewish underground organization, so at first the Polish underground authorities contacted Jews unofficially. Polish authorities had soon established contacts with Jewish communities in ghettos and beyond, with the help of the Bund through the Polish Socialist Party and with the Hechaluc, through the Polish Scout Association and Aleksander Kamiński. In time, both the Polish and Jewish undergrounds matured and new organizations evolved.

On 1 February 1942 Woliński became the head of the "Jewish Department" (or "Referat Żydowski") in Bureau of Information and Propaganda (Biuro lnformacji i Propagandy) at 'Komenda Główna' of the AK and provided information to the Polish government-in-exile about the Holocaust. Wolinski was the co-author of the report of the underground authorities to the Polish government-in-exile in London. He provided information about the mass deportations from the Warsaw Ghetto to Treblinka that lasted from July 22 till mid September 1942, when over 300,000 Jews from the Warsaw Ghetto were transported under the guise of "resettlement for work in the East". He received daily reports from railway men about the number of trains and of people in them, and he likely received the reports from Witold Pilecki, AK operative who became the only person to volunteered to be imprisoned in Auschwitz in order to organize camp's resistance and provide information on the atrocities. Through Woliński's network the Polish government in London was able to inform the Allied governments and the western mass media about the enormity of German crimes in Poland and particularly against its Jewish population, however much of the reports were judged as exaggeration in the West.

Woliński served as the Polish underground’s liaison with the Żydowska Organizacja Bojowa (ŻOB, or Jewish Fighting Association). For Arie Wilner, the Jewish liaison of ZOB, and for Jewish Żegota leaders Woliński was their primary contact in the Armia Krajowa. He was also one of people who came out with the initiative of creating Żegota - Council for Aid to Jews. His department provided work permits and shelter allowing many Jews to escape imprisonment and death, he also procured weapons for the Jewish underground. The latter aid was small, insufficient for the enormous needs, but the AK had itself only a very limited amount of arms and ammunition and in the Warsaw Uprising a year and a half after the Warsaw Ghetto Uprising, the Polish insurgents were even less equipped than the ghetto fighters.

Woliński is known to have been a strong voice in the AK command supporting any action supporting the Jews. He headed a Żegota cell that saved almost 300 Jews and he himself harbored in his apartment over 25 Jews for a period going from a few days to several weeks.

After the war Woliński was recognized by Yad Vashem as one of the Righteous among the Nations. He worked as a lawyer in the People's Republic of Poland, in Katowice, until he retired in 1976. He died in 1986.

In 2008 Woliński was posthumously awarded with the Commander's Cross of the Order of Polonia Restituta.

== See also ==
- Polish Jews
- List of Poles
