= Survivors Park, Łódź =

Park in Łódź, Poland commemorating survivors of the Łódź Ghetto

Survivors' Park; Park Ocalałych
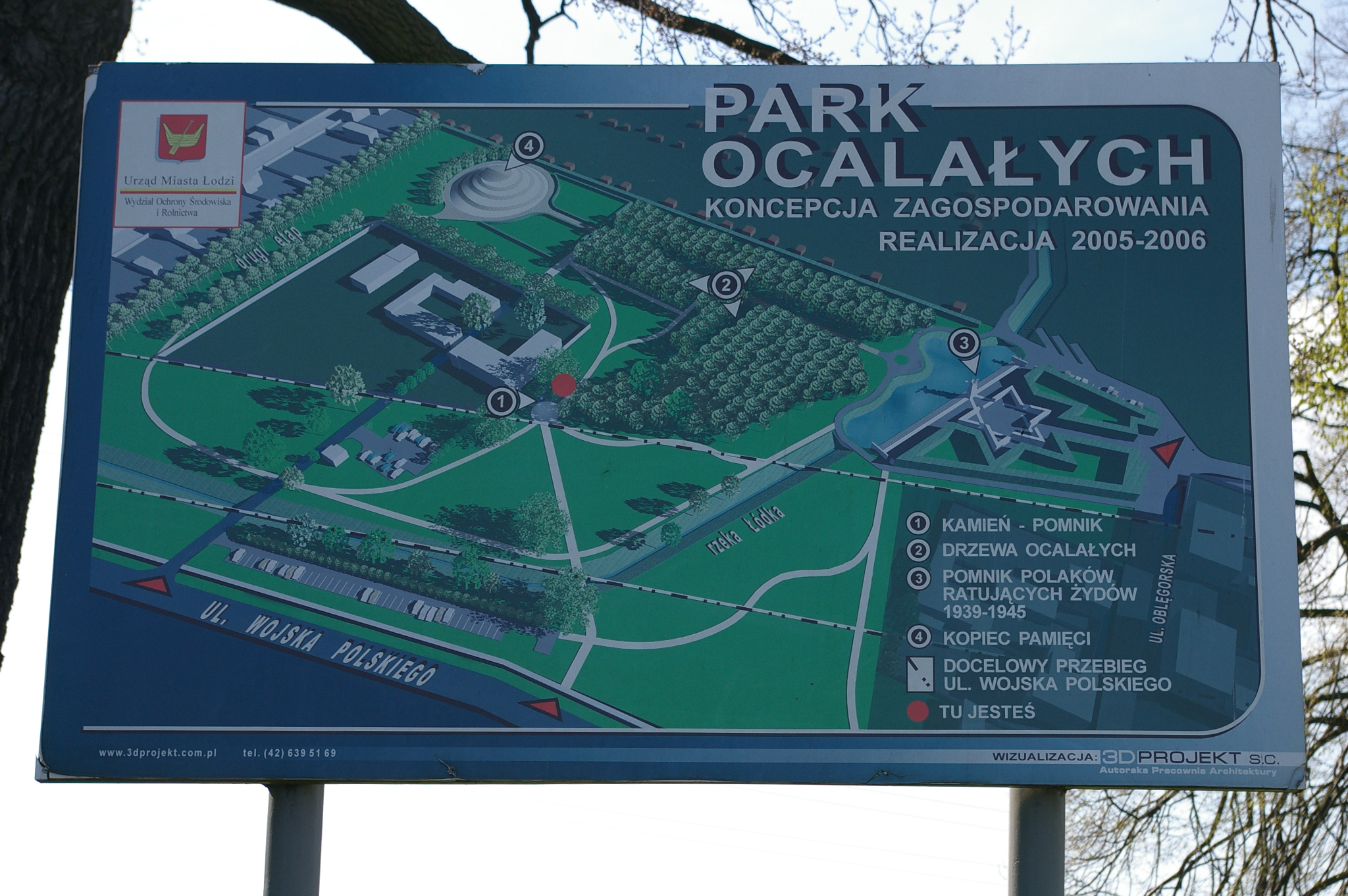
- Interactive map of: Survivors' Park; Park Ocalałych
- Type: Municipal
- Location: Łódź
- Coordinates: 51°47′10″N 19°28′23″E
- Area: 8.5 ha
- Status: Open all year

Survivors' Park (Polish: Park Ocalałych) is a park in Łódź commemorating people who survived the Łódź Ghetto, which was created and operated by Nazi Germany during the Holocaust. The park was officially opened on 30 August 2004, the 60th anniversary of the liquidation of the ghetto. The park is located in the former territory of Łódź Ghetto, between Wojska Polskiego Street and allotment gardens at Sporna Street in the valley of the Lodz River, in the area adjacent to the borders of the Litzmannstadt Ghetto during the war in Smugowa Street (it was originally to be located at Stalowa Street). The park was designed by Grażyna Ojrzyńska.

== Overview ==
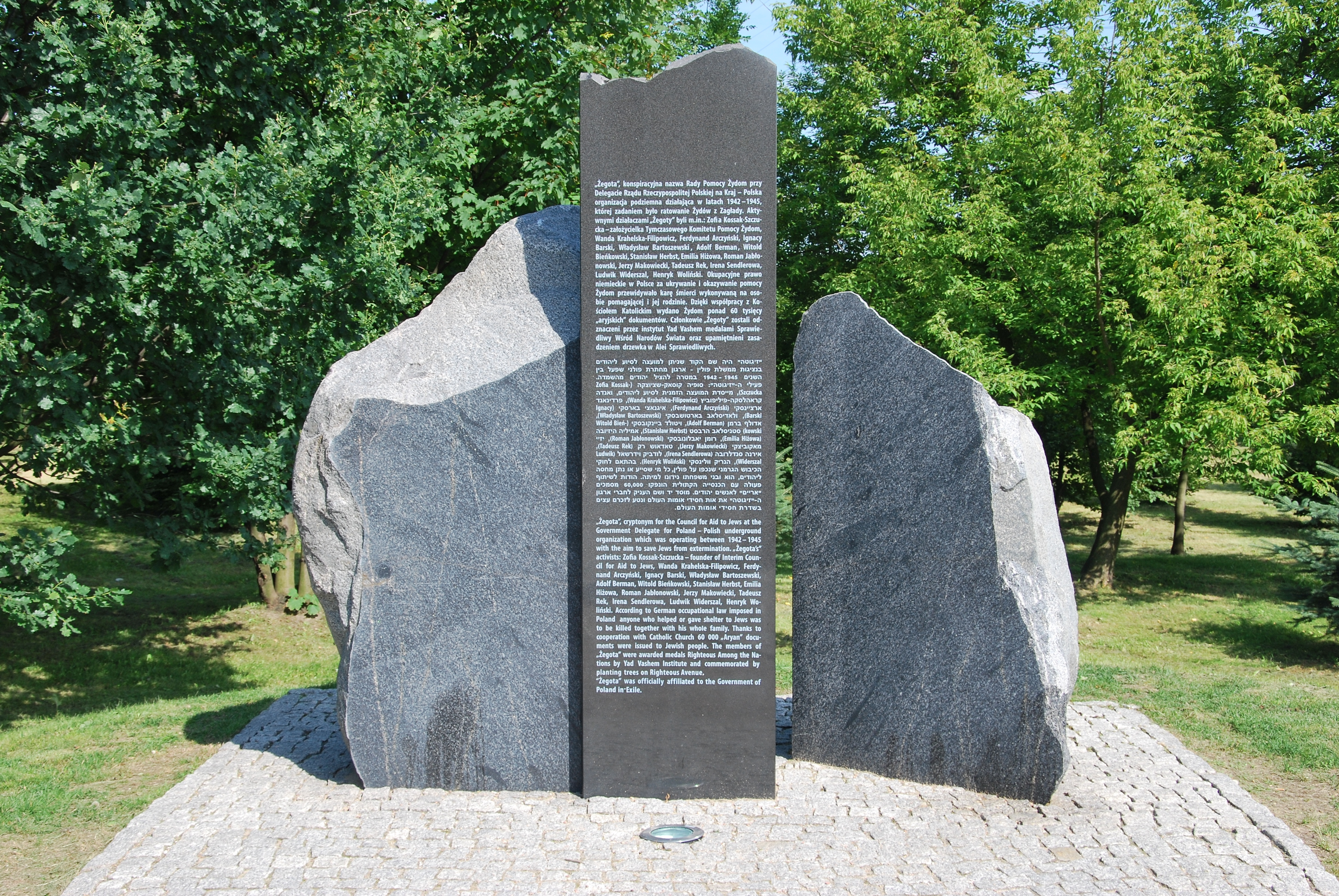
A monument dedicated to Żegota

The originator of the park was Halina Elczewska, who survived the Łódź ghetto (she was transported from the ghetto to Auschwitz and then to Ravensbrück). She was also the first to plant her "tree of memory". A monument – a boulder (found in the park) commemorating the tragic events of 1940-1944 was unveiled under one of the two monumental pedunculate oaks. It has inscriptions in four languages: Polish, English, Hebrew and Yiddish.

418 Holocaust survivors who managed to reach Łódź planted their individual trees: oaks, maples, lindens, birches, hornbeams, beeches, pines, spruces and larches. The trees were numbered and entered into the register, and the survivors received certificates with the name and number of the tree. Along the Arnold Mostowicz Avenue there are plaques with the surnames and number of the survivor's tree. In total, 450 trees were planted throughout the park on an area of one and a half hectares. The target area of the park is 8.5 hectares, in this area there is a water reservoir on the Łódka River. Alleys and squares with gravel-clay surface and granite cubes were also created.

The alley connects two main elements of the park: Monument to Poles Saving Jews during World War II and Memorial Mound. The monument, built according to the design of Czesław Bielecki, contains symbols of two nations: the statue of the White Eagle and the Star of David, formed from boards with the names of Poles honored with the title "Righteous Among the Nations". The 10-meter Memorial Mound, built at the other end of the park, is a viewpoint of the area. At the top of the mound there is a monument-bench of Jan Karski.

The construction of the park, as a long-term investment task, was approved by the City Council. Work began in autumn 2005 with clearing the area and demolition of ruins. The monument was unveiled in 2009. The park has the seat of the Dialogue Center named after Marek Edelman, where conferences and educational activities take place.
