= Leon Feiner =

Polish lawyer and politician

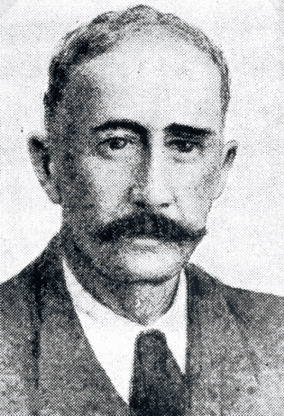
- Born: 1885; Kraków, Austria-Hungary
- Died: 22 February 1945 (aged 59–60); Lublin, Poland
- Resting place: Warsaw Jewish Cemetery
- Occupations: Lawyer, social activist
- Known for: Vice chairman of Żegota
- Political party: General Jewish Labour Bund in Poland

Leon Feiner (nom-de-guerre "Mikołaj" (Michael), "Berezowski"; 1885 – February 22, 1945) was a Polish lawyer and activist. He was an activist of the General Jewish Labour Bund in Poland and between November 1944 and January 1945 the director (prezes) and vice-chairman of the Council to Aid Jews "Żegota".

== Biography ==
Feiner was born in 1885 in Kraków. He served as a defense attorney in political trials and was active in the Association of Socialist Lawyers. In 1939, he was sent to the Bereza Kartuska Prison for six weeks. After the outbreak of World War II with the German invasion of Poland, the Soviet Union also invaded on September 17, as part of the Molotov–Ribbentrop Pact between Nazi Germany and Soviet Union. Feiner was caught in the Soviet part of occupied Poland, was arrested by the NKVD and spent several months in a Soviet prison in Lida, near Wilno. Despite the fact that before the war on several occasions he had defended Polish Communists in court as an attorney, and that he had belonged to a socialist organization (the General Jewish Labour Bund in Poland), the Soviets authorities charged him with being a "fascist" and a "counter revolutionary" After the Nazi invasion of the Soviet Union Feiner managed to escape after the Soviets fled Lida in 1941, and made his way to Nazi-occupied Warsaw.

During the Nazi occupation of Poland Feiner, even though he lived in the "Aryan" side of Warsaw under the assumed name "Berezowski", was one of the central personalities of the Jewish underground in the city. He was the author of most of the communiques of the Bund from Poland to the Western allies, in which he described Nazi terror and brutality.

Feiner also served as a guide for the Polish courier Jan Karski inside the Warsaw Ghetto (they both crossed into the ghetto through the Warsaw sewers). Karski asked Feiner what prominent American and British Jews should do. "Tell the Jewish leaders," Feiner said, "that ... they must find the strength and courage to make sacrifices no other statesmen have ever had to make, sacrifices as painful as the fate of my dying people, and as unique." Karski also took Feiner's report to the Polish-Jewish political leaders Szmul Zygielbojm and Ignacy Schwarzbart, who were serving on the Polish National Council of the Polish Government-in-Exile in London. The report described the deportation and murder of Jews in Poland, including a detailed report on Chełmno extermination camp, and gave the estimated number dead, as of May 1942, at 700,000 (the actual number was already much higher). Feiner's instructions to Zygielbojm were to cease mere protests and organize retaliatory bombing, leafleting and execution of Germans captured by the Allies, in response to the Nazi Holocaust. The description of the condition of Jews in German-occupied Poland and Feiner's instructions threw Zygielbojm into depression since he knew that the Allies would be unwilling to help (Zygielbojm eventually committed suicide as a protest against the indifference of the Allied governments in the face of the Holocaust).

After the Warsaw Ghetto Uprising and the liquidation of the ghetto by the Germans, Feiner tried desperately to help those who were sent to slave labor camps.

Leon Feiner survived the Nazi occupation, the Warsaw Ghetto Uprising and the Warsaw Uprising, and was rescued in Lublin in January 1945. However, due to terminal illness (throat cancer) he died in Lublin soon afterward, on February 22. Even while in the hospital he maintained relationships with his friends and fellow political activists and participated in discussions of the future of the Bund in Poland.

He is buried in the main row of the Okopowa Street Jewish Cemetery in Warsaw (quarter 12).
