= Ferdynand Arczyński =

Polish politician

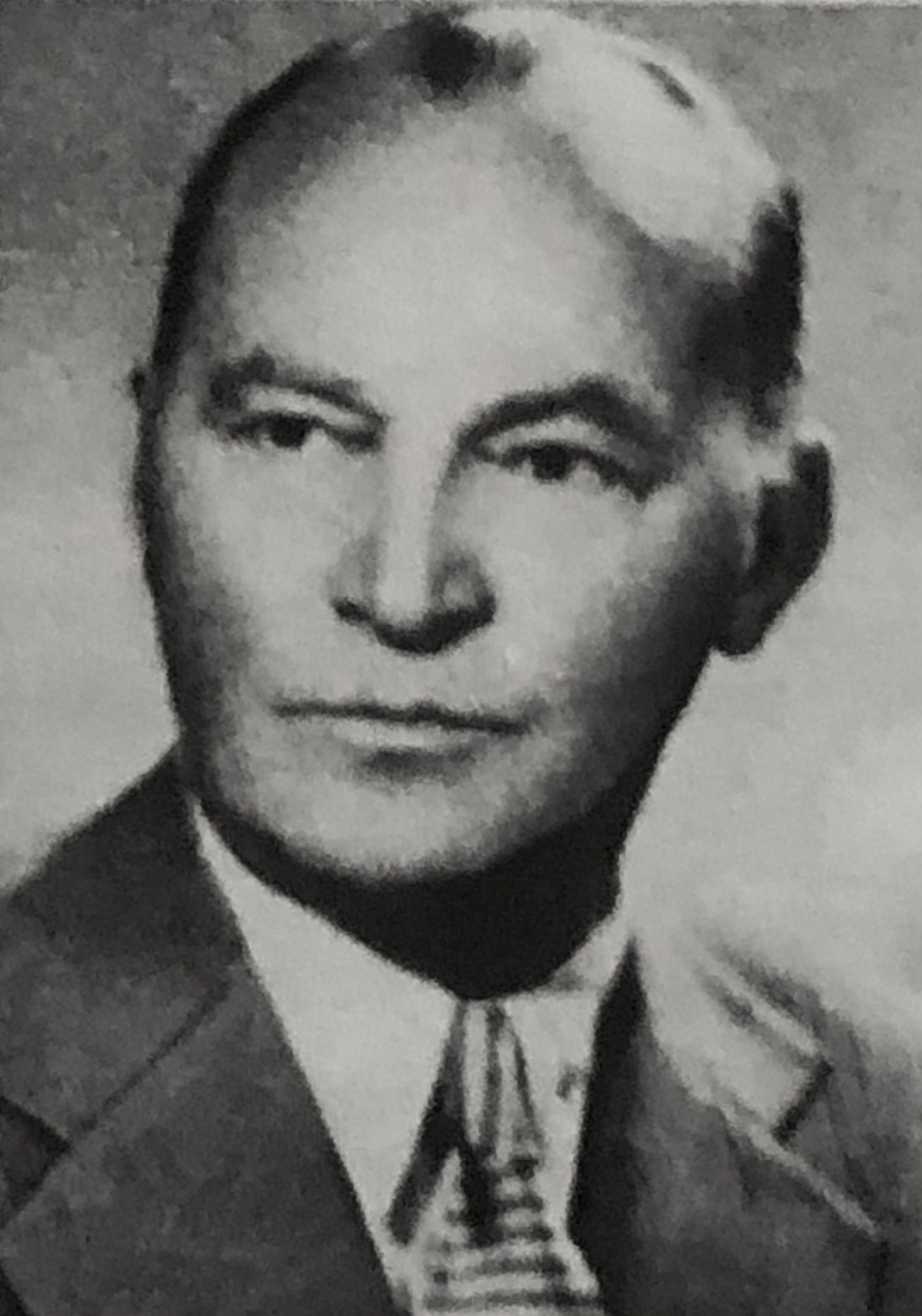
Ferdynand Arczyński

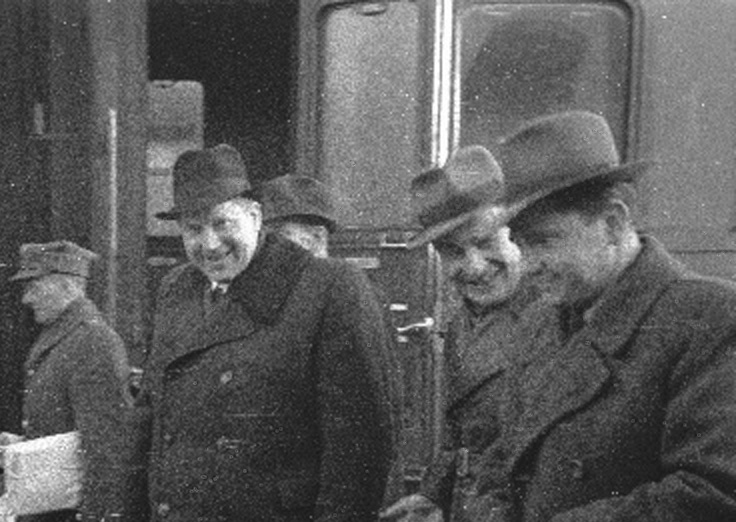
MP Ferdynand Arczyński (2nd from right) and deputy PM Antoni Korzycki (3rd right). March 19, 1948

Ferdynand Marek Arczyński (December 8, 1900 in Kraków – 1979 in Warsaw), cryptonym "Marek" or "Lukowski", was one of the founding members of an underground organization Żegota (Council for Aid to Jews) in German-occupied Poland, from 1942 to 1945. Żegota's express purpose was to help the country's Jews survive the Holocaust; find places of safety for them, and provide relief payments to thousands of families. Poland was the only country in occupied Europe with such an organization during World War II.

== Life ==
Born in 1900, Arczyński participated in the Silesian Uprisings (1919–21) during the formation of the sovereign Second Polish Republic. He was a member of the Polish Democratic Party and an editor of the Polish Daily (Dziennik Polski, pl) in Kraków. Following the Nazi-Soviet invasion of Poland, Arczyński worked tirelessly for Żegota, serving not only as treasurer but also as head of its "legalization" department, which produced forged documents distributed to Jews in the care of Żegota. He also acted as a liaison with branches of Żegota in Kraków, Lwów and Lublin. He was an unofficial, but successful recruiting officer.

=== Saving Jews ===
As Żegota treasurer and head of the Legalization Bureau, Ferdynand Arczyński produced daily hundreds of false IDs, work cards, Roman Catholic birth and marriage certificates which were given out free of charge to some 4,000 Jews hiding on the "Aryan" side of the ghettos. He arranged for places to live, medical help, and monthly cash disbursements. He helped with providing aid to Jews in concentration camps. Arczyński, "Marek", was also a founding member of Kraków and Lwów branches of Żegota.

After the war, Marek Ferdynand Arczyński served as Member of Parliament (Sejm) from 1947 until 1952, in the Department of Communication, and worked as a journalist.

== Recognition ==
In 1965, Ferdynand Arczynski visited Israel, where on May 18, 1965, Yad Vashem recognized him as Righteous Among the Nations.

== See also ==
- Rescue of Jews in Poland during the Holocaust
