= Andrzej Friszke =

Polish historian and lecturer (born 1956)

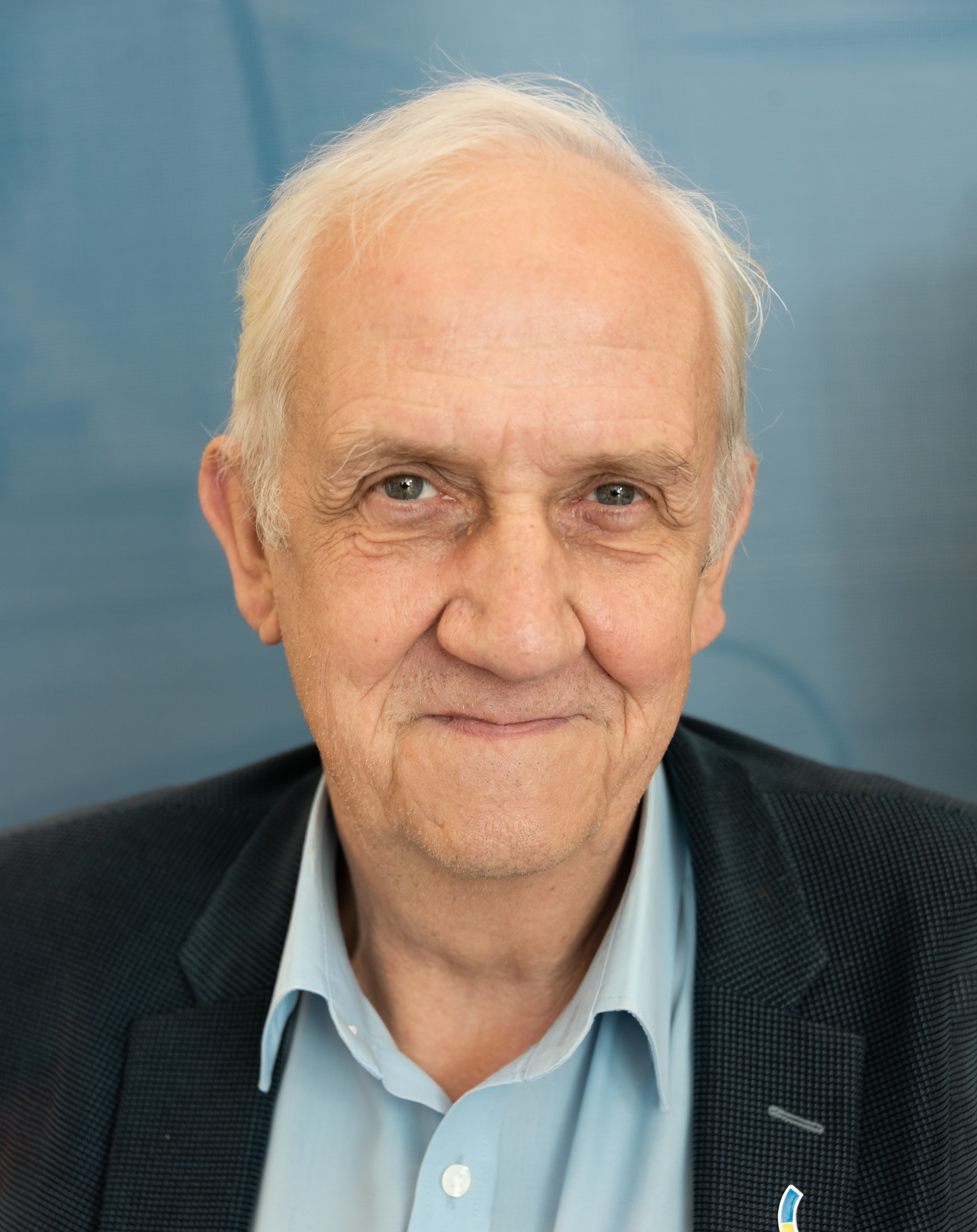
Andrzej Friszke (2024).

Andrzej Friszke (born 29 August 1956 in Olsztyn) is a Polish historian and lecturer. He specializes in the history of communist Poland and the democratic opposition to the communist regime.

Friszke graduated in 1979 from the Department of History of the University of Warsaw. Since 1980 he has worked in the Club of Catholic Intellectuals in Warsaw. In 1981 he worked as a newspaper editor of the history section of the Solidarność weekly. Since 1982 he has also been an editor of the history section of Więź magazine. Since 1990 Friszke has worked at the Institute of Political Studies of the Polish Academy of Sciences. Since 1995 he has lectured at the Collegium Civitas. In 1999 he was appointed to the Collegium of the Institute of National Remembrance and worked there until 2007. In 2006 he was awarded the Knight's Cross of the Order of Polonia Restituta.

In 1994 he received a doctoral degree in historical science, and in 2000 he was habilitated. On 25 September 2009 President Lech Kaczyński awarded him a professorial degree.

== Works ==
- KOR. Ludzie-działania-idee (1983)
- O kształt niepodległej (1989)
- Polska Podziemna 1939–1945 (coauthor) (1991)
- Opozycja polityczna w PRL 1945–1980 (Political Opposition in the PRL 1945–1980) (1994)
- Polska Gierka (Gierek's Poland) (1995)
- Oaza na Kopernika. Klub Inteligencji Katolickiej 1956–1989 (1997)
- Życie polityczne Emigracji (Political Life of the Emigration) (1999)
- Polska. Losy państwa i narodu 1939–1989 (Poland. The Fate of the Country and the Nation 1939–1989) (2003)
- Solidarność podziemna 1981–1989 (ed.) (2006)
- Przystosowanie i opór. Studia z dziejów PRL (2007)
- PRL wobec Kościoła. Akta 1970–1978 (2010)
- Adam Ciołkosz: Portret polskiego socjalisty (Adam Ciołkosz: Portrait of a Polish Socialist) (2011)
