= Witold Bieńkowski =

Polish politician

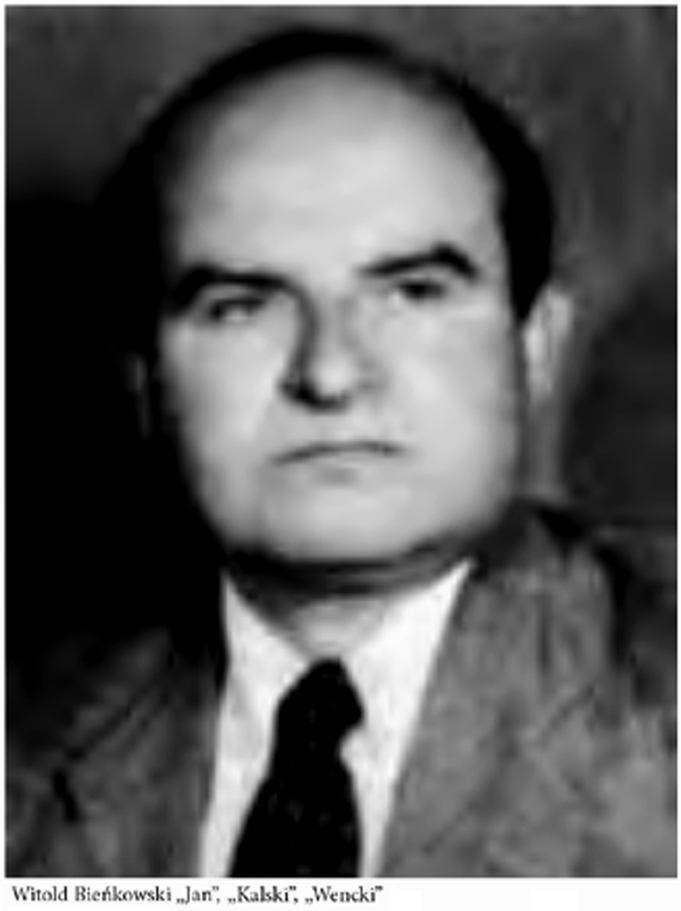
Witold Bieńkowski

Witold Bieńkowski, code-name Wencki (1906–1965), was a Polish politician, publicist and leader of the Catholic underground organization called Front for a Reborn Poland (Front Odrodzenia Polski, F.O.P.) during World War II, as well as member of the Provisional Committee to Aid Jews, Żegota, and a permanent representative of the Delegation for Poland of the Polish Government-in-Exile.

Bieńkowski was a Deputy to the Polish parliament (Sejm) from 1947 to 1952. He served as editor-in-chief of the Catholic weekly Dziś i Jutro (Polish: Today and Tomorrow) between 1945 and 1947.
