= Zofia Kossak-Szczucka =

Polish writer (1889–1968)

Zofia Kossak-Szczucka TOSD
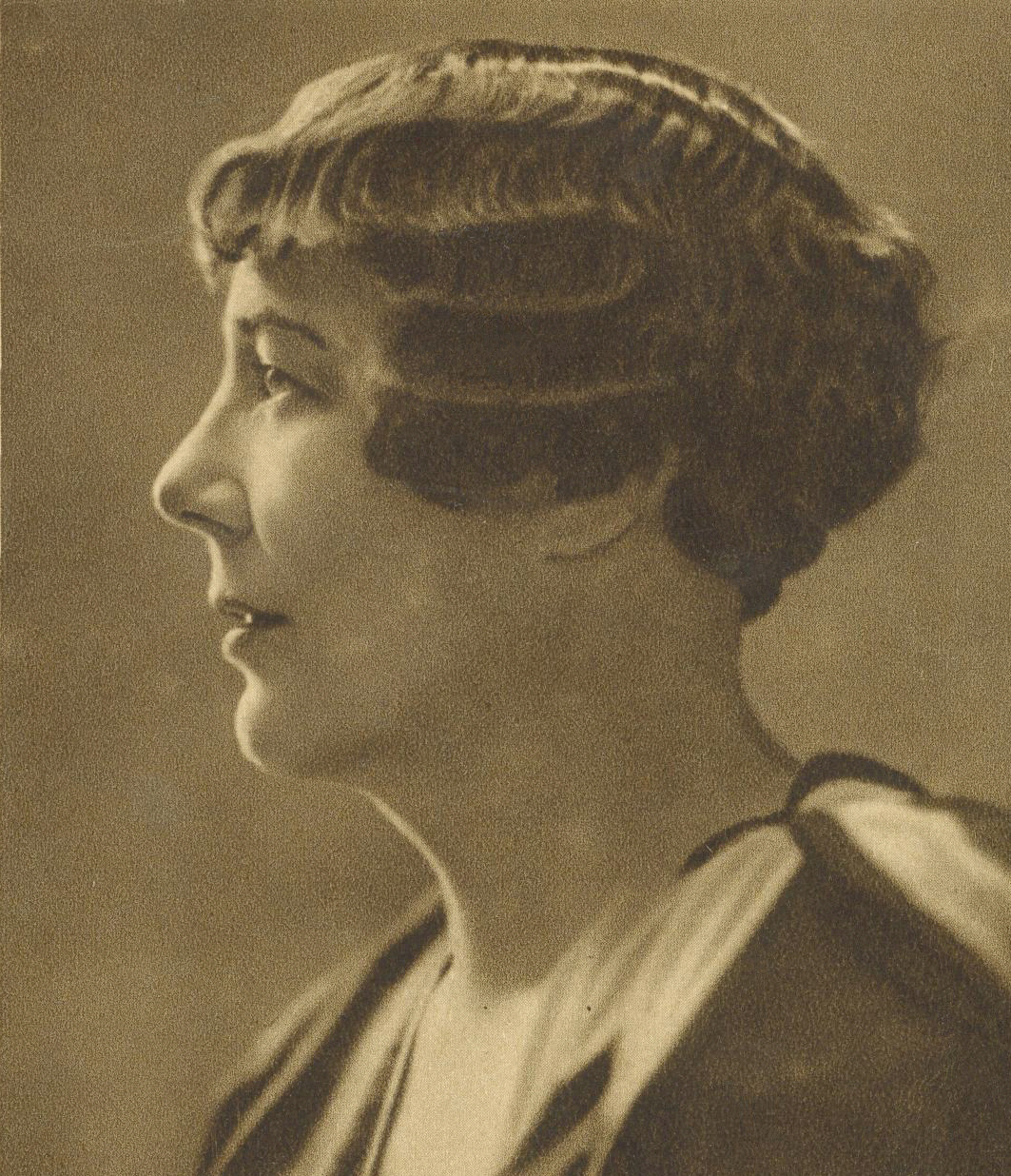
- Zofia Kossak-Szczucka in 1933
- Born: Zofia Kossak; 10 August 1889; Kośmin, Congress Poland, Russian Empire
- Died: 9 April 1968 (aged 78); Bielsko-Biała, Poland
- Occupations: Writer & Resistance fighter
- Relatives: Tadeusz Kossak (father); Juliusz Kossak (grandfather); Wojciech Kossak (uncle)

Zofia Kossak-Szczucka (Polish pronunciation: [ˈzɔfʲja ˈkɔssak ˈʂt͡ʂut͡ska] (also Kossak-Szatkowska); 10 August 1889 (Note: 8 August 1890, has usually been given as her birthdate, including by herself, but her recently discovered birth certificate confirms the date as 10 August 1889 — see) – 9 April 1968) was a Polish writer and World War II resistance fighter.

She co-founded two wartime Polish organizations: Front for the Rebirth of Poland and Żegota, set up to assist Polish Jews to escape the Holocaust. In 1943, she was arrested by the Germans and sent to Auschwitz concentration camp, but survived the war.

== Biography ==
=== Early life ===
Zofia Kossak was the daughter of Tadeusz Kossak, who was the twin brother of painter Wojciech Kossak, and granddaughter of painter Juliusz Kossak. She married twice. In 1923, following the death of her first husband Stefan Szczucki in Lwiw, she settled in the village of Górki Wielkie in Cieszyn Silesia where in 1925 she married Zygmunt Szatkowski.

=== Activism ===
She was associated with the Czartak literary group, and wrote mainly for the Catholic press. Her best-known work from that period is The Blaze, a memoir of the Russian Revolution of 1917. In 1936, she received the prestigious Gold Laurel (Złoty Wawrzyn) of the Polish Academy of Literature. Kossak-Szczucka's historical novels include Beatum scelus (1924), Złota wolność (Golden Liberty, 1928), Legnickie pole (The Field of Legnica, 1930), Trembowla (1939), Suknia Dejaniry (The Gift of Nessus, 1939). Best known are Krzyżowcy (Angels in The Dust, 1935), Król trędowaty (The Leper King, 1936), and Bez oręża (Blessed are The Meek, 1937) dealing with the Crusades and later Francis of Assisi, translated into several languages. She also wrote Z miłości (From Love, 1926) and Szaleńcy boży (God's Madmen, 1929), on religious themes.

=== World War II ===
==== Press activities ====
During the German occupation of Poland, she worked in the underground press: from 1939 to 1941, she co-edited the underground newspaper Polska żyje (Poland Lives). In 1941, she co-founded the Catholic organization Front Odrodzenia Polski (Front for the Rebirth of Poland), and edited its newspaper, Prawda (The Truth).

In the underground, she used the code name Weronika.

==== "Protest!" ====
In the summer of 1942, when the liquidation of the Warsaw Ghetto began, Kossak-Szczucka published a leaflet entitled "Protest!", of which 5,000 copies were printed. In the leaflet, she described in graphic terms the conditions in the ghetto, and the horrific circumstances of the deportations then taking place. "All will perish ... Poor and rich, old, women, men, youngsters, infants, Catholics dying with the name of Jesus and Mary together with Jews. Their only guilt is that they were born into the Jewish nation condemned to extermination by Hitler."

The world, Kossak-Szczucka wrote, was silent in the face of this atrocity. "England is silent, so is America, even the influential international Jewry, so sensitive in its reaction to any transgression against its people, is silent. Poland is silent ... Dying Jews are surrounded only by a host of Pilates washing their hands in innocence." Those who are silent in the face of murder, she wrote, become accomplices to the crime. Kossak-Szczucka saw this largely as an issue of religious ethics. "Our feelings toward Jews have not changed", she wrote. "We do not stop thinking of them as political, economic and ideological enemies of Poland." But, she wrote, this does not relieve Polish Catholics of their duty to oppose the crimes being committed in their country.

She co-founded the Provisional Committee to Aid Jews (Tymczasowy Komitet Pomocy Żydom), which later turned into the council to Aid Jews (Rada Pomocy Żydom), codenamed Żegota, an underground organization whose sole purpose was to save Jews in Poland from Nazi extermination. In 1985, she was posthumously named one of the Righteous Among the Nations by Yad Vashem.

Regarding Kossak-Szczucka's "Protest!", Robert D. Cherry and Annamaria Orla-Bukowska wrote in the introduction to Rethinking Poles and Jews: "Without at all whitewashing her antisemitism in the document, she vehemently called for active intercession on behalf of the Jews – precisely in the name of Polish Roman Catholicism and Polish patriotism. The deportations from the Warsaw Ghetto precipitated her cofounding of Żegota that year – part of the Polish Underground State whose sole purpose was to save Jews."

==== Arrest ====
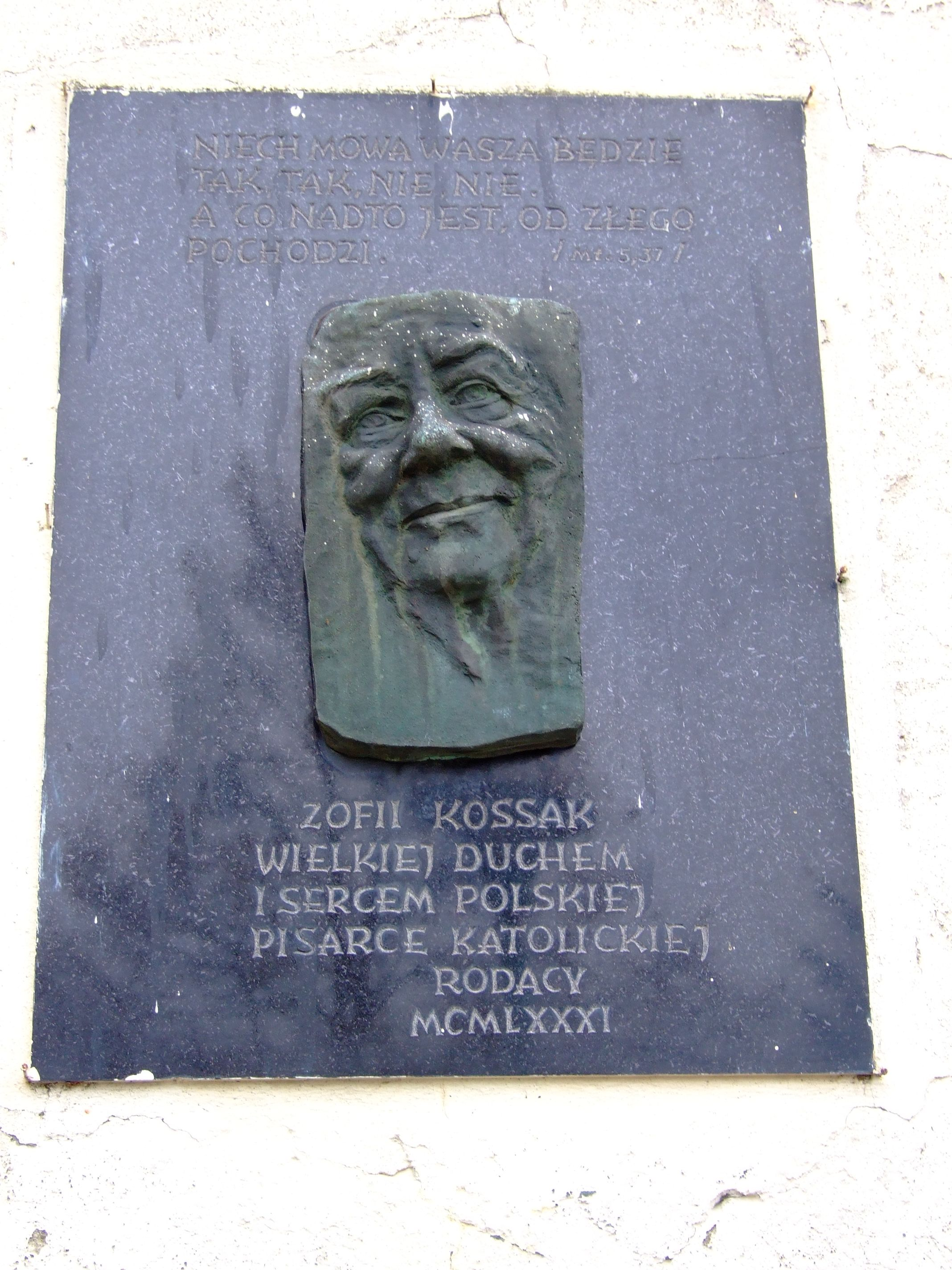
"To Zofia Kossak, the renowned Polish Catholic writer, a woman of great generosity and courage. Placed by her fellow citizens, 1981" (Memorial tablet on the outside of All Saints Parish Church in Górki Wielkie)

On 27 September 1943, Kossak-Szczucka was arrested in Warsaw by a German street patrol. The Germans, not realising who she was, sent her first to the prison at Pawiak and then to Auschwitz II-Birkenau concentration camp. When her true identity became known in April 1944, she was sent back to Warsaw for interrogation and sentenced to death. She was released in July 1944 through the efforts of the Polish underground and participated in the Warsaw Uprising.

=== Post-war ===
At the end of World War II, a communist regime began to establish itself in Poland. In June 1945, Kossak was called in by Jakub Berman, the new Polish minister of the interior, who was Jewish. He strongly advised her to leave the country immediately for her own protection, knowing what his government would do to political enemies, and also knowing from his brother, Adolf Berman, what Kossak had done to save Jewish lives. Kossak escaped to the West, but returned to Poland in 1957.

Kossak-Szczucka published Z Otchłani (From the Abyss, 1946), based on her experiences of Auschwitz. Dziedzictwo (Heritage. 1956–67) is about the Kossak family. Przymierze (The Covenant, 1951) tells the story of Abraham. Kossak-Szczucka also wrote books for children and teenagers, including Bursztyn (1936) and Gród nad jeziorem (Settlement by the Lake, 1938).

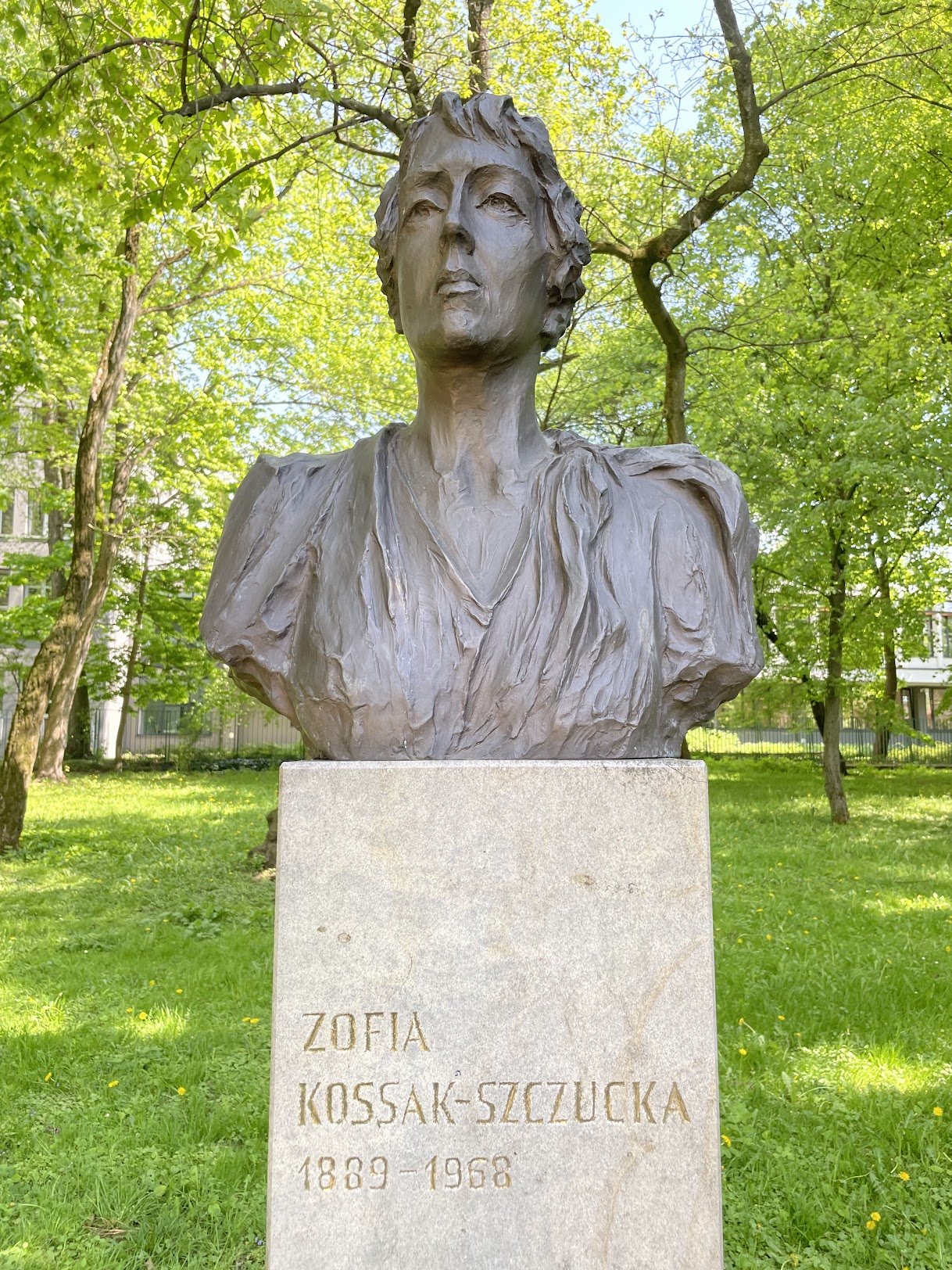
Bust of Zofia Kossak-Szczucka, by Jósef Opala, in Henryk Jordan Park, Kraków

In 1964 she was one of the signatories of the so-called Letter of 34 to Prime Minister Józef Cyrankiewicz regarding freedom of culture.

In 1982 the Yad Vashem Institute in Jerusalem recognised Zofia Kossak as a Righteous Among Nations. In 2009, the National Bank of Poland issued a coin posthumously commemorating the work of Kossak, Irena Sendler and Matylda Getter in helping Jews (see Żegota). In 2018 Zofia Kossak was awarded the highest Polish order, the Order of the White Eagle.

Zofia's daughter, Anna Szatkowska (15 March 1928, Górki Wielkie – 27 February 2015), wrote a book about her experience during the Warsaw Uprising.

== Works ==
She was the author of many works, a number of which have been translated into English.

Selected works:

- Beatum scelus
- Beatyfikacja Skargi
- Bez oręża (1937) (English title: Blessed are The Meek, 1944)
- Błogosławiona wina (1953)
- Błogosławiony Jan Sarkander ze Skoczowa
- Bursztyny
- Chrześcijańskie posłannictwo Polski
- Oblicze Matki (Das Antlitz der Mutter, 1948)
- Dziedzictwo
- Dzień dzisiejszy (1931)
- Gród nad jeziorem
- Kielich krwi - obrazek sceniczny w dwóch aktach
- Kłopoty Kacperka góreckiego skrzata (1924) (English title: The Troubles of a Gnome, 1928)
- Król trędowaty (1937) (English title: The Leper King)
- Krzyżowcy (1935) (English title: Angels in the Dust)
- Ku swoim (1932)
- Legnickie pole (1931)
- Na drodze
- Na Śląsku
- Nieznany kraj (1932)
- Ognisty wóz
- Pątniczym szlakiem. Wrażenia z pielgrzymki (1933)
- Pod lipą
- Pożoga (1922) (English title: The Blaze, 1927)
- Prometeusz i garncarz
- Przymierze (1952) (English title: The Covenant, 1951)
- Purpurowy szlak
- Puszkarz Orbano
- Rewindykacja polskości na Kresach
- Rok polski: obyczaj i wiara
- S.O.S. ... !
- Skarb Śląski (1937)
- Suknia Dejaniry (English title: The Gift of Nessus)
- Szaleńcy Boży (1929)
- Szukajcie przyjaciół (1933)
- Topsy i Lupus (1931)
- Trembowla
- Troja północy with Zygmunt Szatkowski historic novel about Polabian Slavs
- W Polsce Podziemnej: wybrane pisma dotyczące lat 1939–1944
- Warna
- Wielcy i mali (1927)
- Wspomnienia z Kornwalii 1947–1957 (2007)
- Z dziejów Śląska
- Z miłości (1925)
- Z otchłani (1946)
- Złota wolność (1928)

== See also ==
- Wanda Krahelska-Filipowicz
- Polish culture during World War II
- Maria Pawlikowska-Jasnorzewska
- Magdalena Samozwaniec
