= Wanda Krahelska-Filipowicz =

Polish Resistance fighter

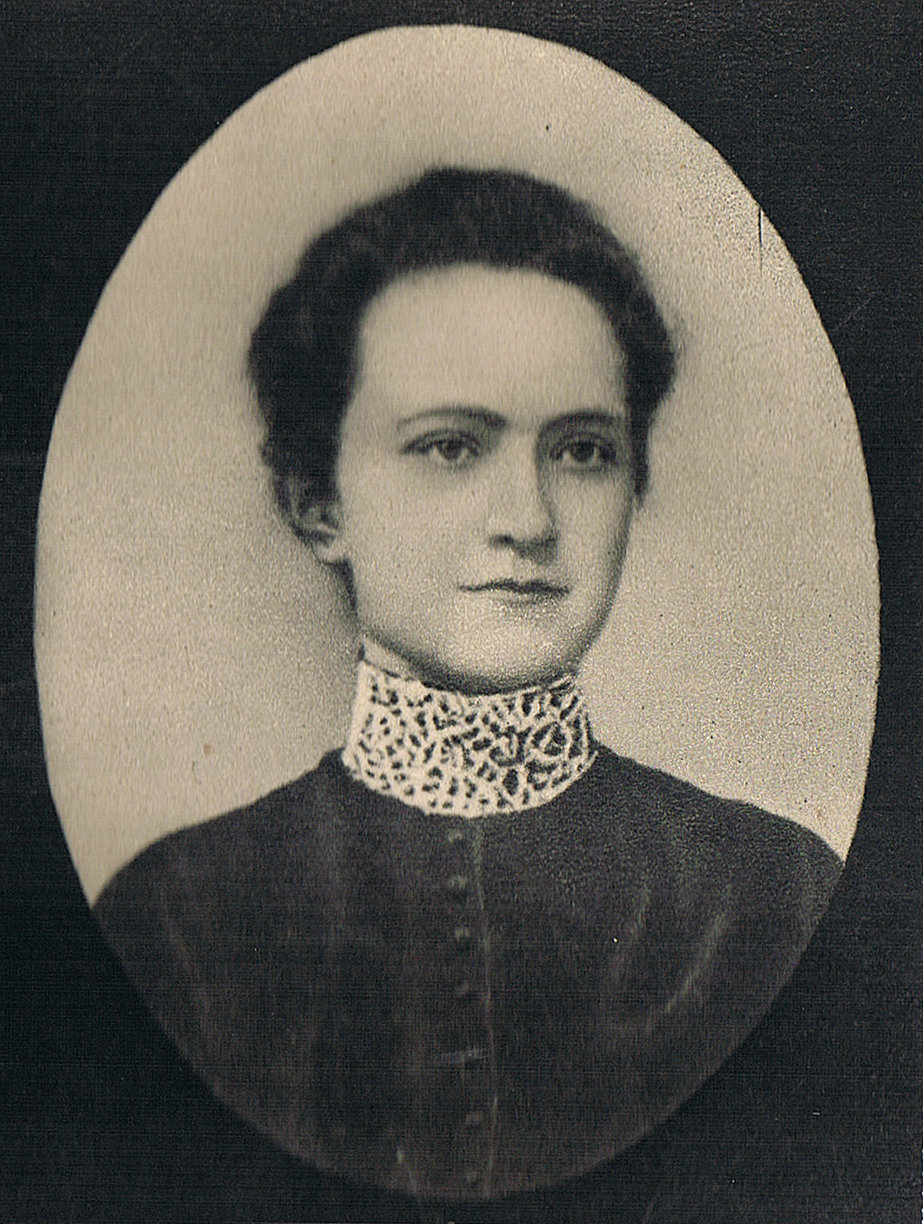
Wanda Krahelska-Filipowicz in 1905.

Wanda Krahelska-Filipowicz (15 December 1886–1968), code name "Alinka" or "Alicja", was a leading figure in Warsaw’s underground resistance movement throughout the years of German occupation during World War II in Poland, co-founder of Żegota. As the well-connected wife of a former ambassador to Washington, she used her contacts with both the military and political leadership of the Polish Underground to materially influence the underground's policy of aiding Poland's Jewish population during the war.

Early on, Krahelska-Filipowicz used her influence to persuade the Government in Exile, including members of the Delegatura and its military counterpart, the AK, of the importance of setting up a central organization to help Poland's Jews, and to back the policy with significant funding.

Krahelska-Filipowicz also personally sheltered Jews in her own home early during the German occupation, regardless of the punishment announced by the Nazi German occupants of Poland for any Pole doing this, which was death. Among the refugees was the widow of the Jewish historian Szymon Aszkenazy.

A Catholic Socialist activist and a devout Democrat, she was the editor of the Polish art magazine "Arkady".

In the pre-World War I partitioned Poland, on 18 August 1906, at the age of twenty she took part in an assassination attempt on the Russian governor-general of Warsaw, Georgi Skalon. She threw three 'dynamite bombs' on the governor's coach; two did explode and slightly injured three persons in governor's entourage. Afterwards, she fled to Kraków in Austrian part of Poland, entered into fictional marriage with painter Adam Dobrodzicki and became citizen of Austria-Hungary. Austria refused to extradite her to Russia and instead arranged a trial in Wadowice, starting on 16 February 1908. Wanda Dobrodzicka had confessed but was acquitted.

== See also ==
- Holocaust in Poland
- List of Poles
- Żegota
- Zofia Kossak-Szczucka
