= Żegota =

Polish resistance organization during WWII

Żegota Council to Aid Jews
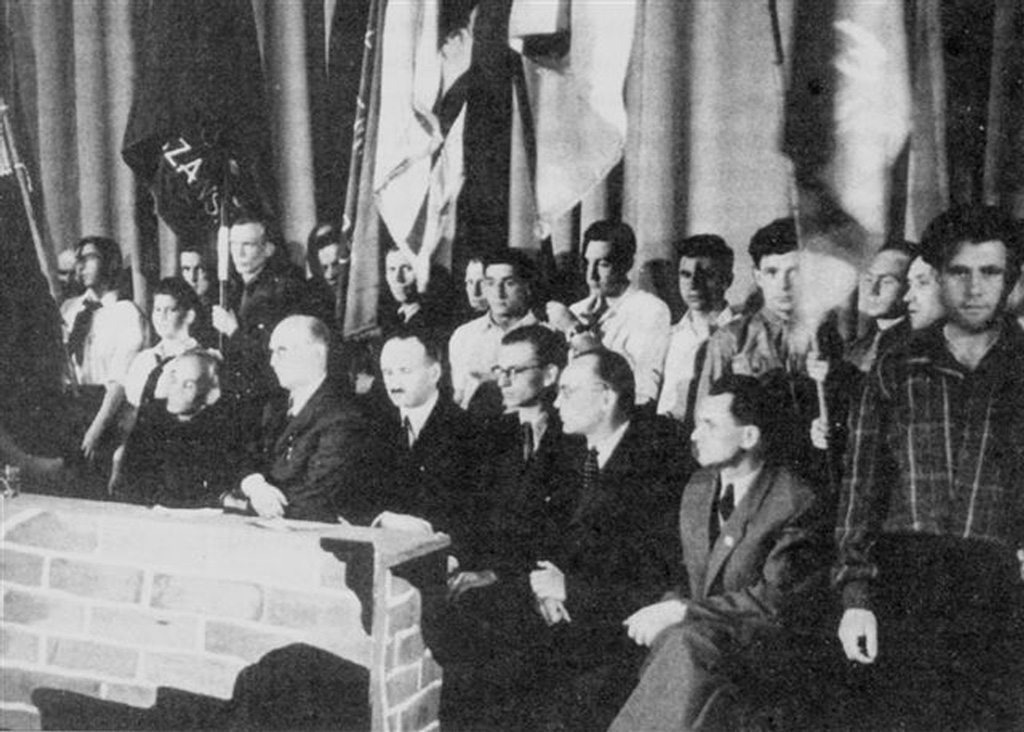
- Third anniversary of Warsaw Ghetto Uprising: Żegota members, Warsaw, April 1946. Seated, from right: Piotr Gajewski, Ferdynand Marek Arczyński, Władysław Bartoszewski, Adolf Berman, Tadeusz Rek.
- Predecessor: Provisional Committee to Aid Jews
- Formation: December 1942; 83 years ago
- Founder: Henryk Woliński,
- Type: Underground organization
- Purpose: Help and distribution of relief funds to Polish Jews in World War II
- Headquarters: Warsaw
- Location: Kraków, Wilno, Lwów
- Region served: German occupied Poland
- Key people: Henryk Woliński, Julian Grobelny, Ferdynand Arczyński, Zofia Kossak-Szczucka, Wanda Krahelska-Filipowicz, Adolf Berman, Leon Feiner, Władysław Bartoszewski

Żegota (pronounced [ʐɛˈɡɔta], full codename: the "Konrad Żegota Committee") was the Polish Council to Aid Jews with the Government Delegation for Poland (Polish: Rada Pomocy Żydom przy Delegaturze Rządu RP na Kraj), an underground Polish resistance organization, and part of the Polish Underground State, active 1942–45 in German-occupied Poland. Żegota was the successor institution to the Provisional Committee to Aid Jews and was established specifically to save Jews. Poland was the only country in German-occupied Europe where such a government-established and -supported underground organization existed.

Estimates of the number of Jews that Żegota provided aid to, and eventually saved, range from several thousands to tens of thousands.

Operatives of Żegota worked in extreme circumstances – under threat of death by the Nazi forces.

== Origins ==
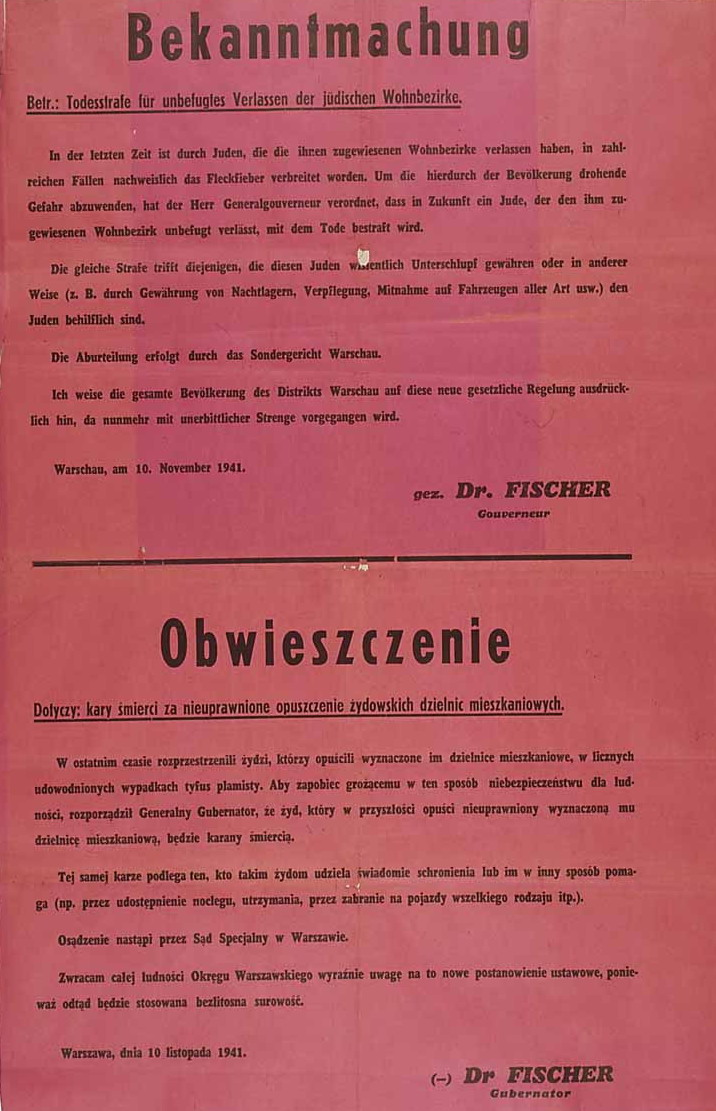
1941 German poster, in German and Polish, on death to Jews outside ghetto and to Poles who helped Jews

Polish Government-in-Exile, The Mass Extermination of Jews in German Occupied Poland, December 1942

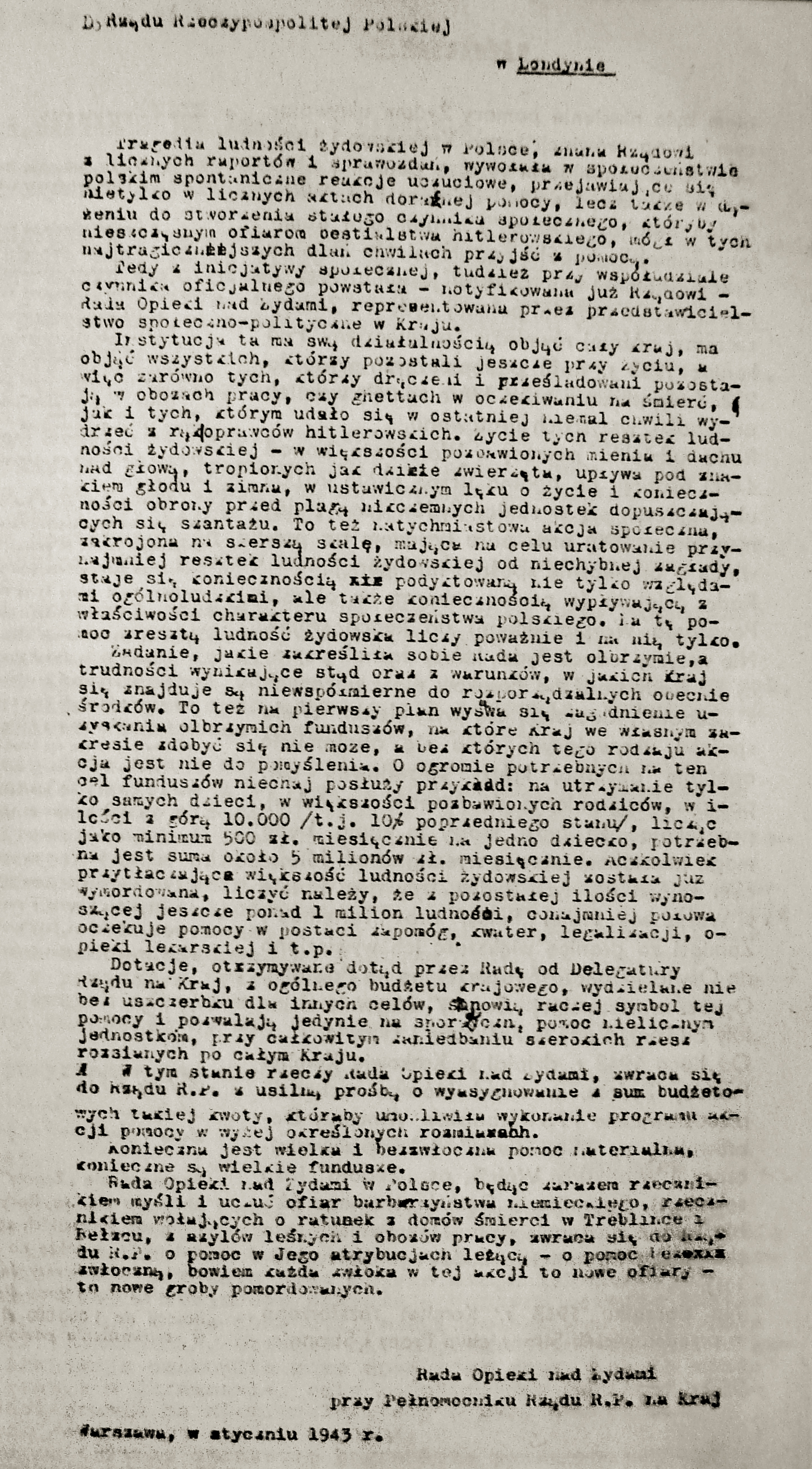
Żegota letter to Polish Government-in-Exile, requesting funds to aid Jews, January 1943

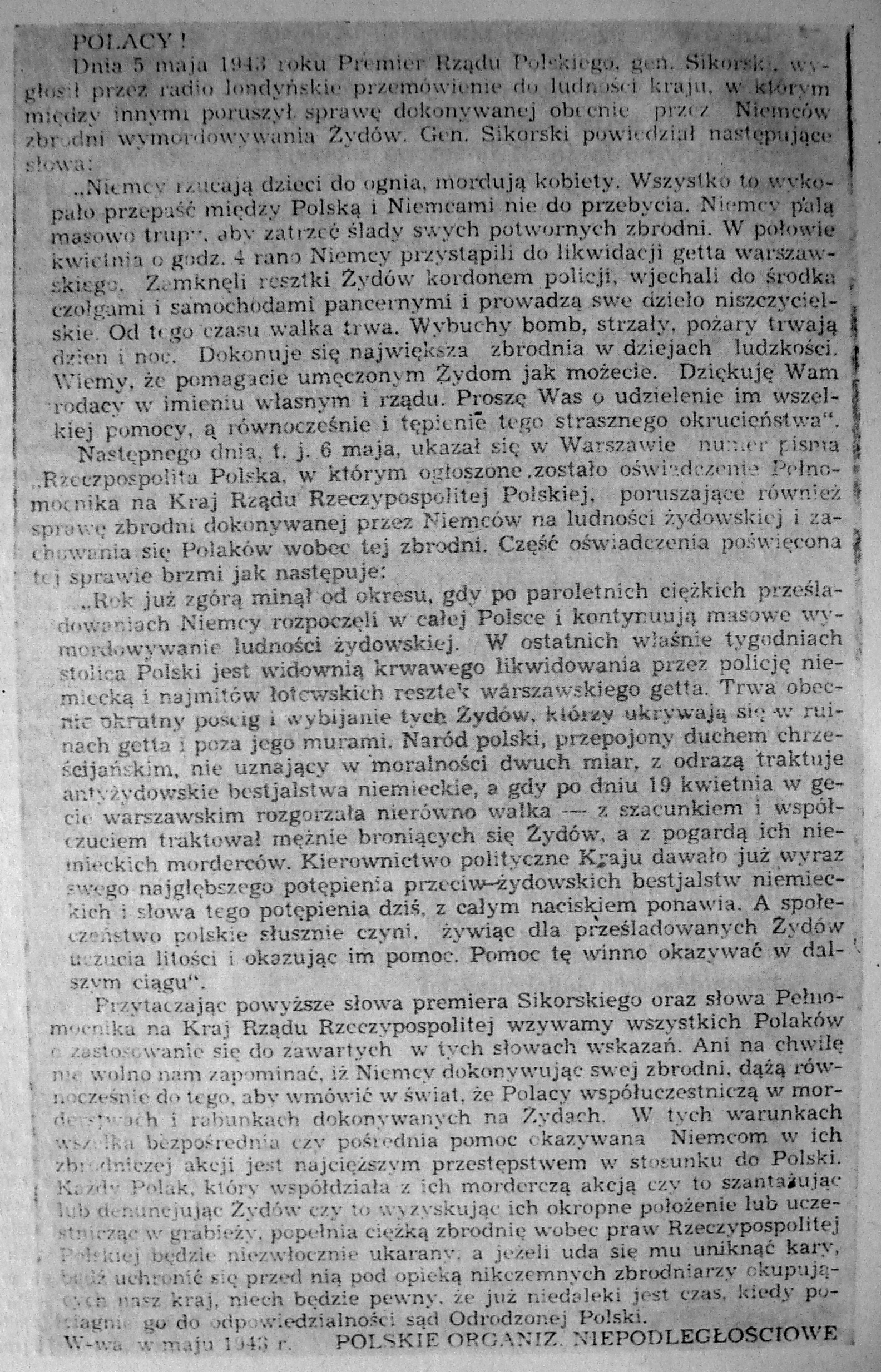
Polish Prime Minister Władysław Sikorski's leaflet appeal to help Jews, Warsaw, May 1943

The Council to Aid Jews, or Żegota, was the continuation of an earlier aid organization, the Provisional Committee to Aid Jews (Tymczasowy Komitet Pomocy Żydom), that was founded on 27 September 1942 by Polish Catholic activists Zofia Kossak-Szczucka and Wanda Krahelska-Filipowicz ("Alinka"). The Provisional Committee cared for as many as 180 people, but due to political and financial reasons it was dissolved and replaced by Żegota on 4 December 1942. One of the co-founders of Żegota was Henryk Woliński of the Home Army (Armia Krajowa) who helped integrate it with the Polish Underground State. Woliński is also credited with developing the idea for this organization.

Kossak-Szczucka initially wanted Żegota to become an example of a "pure Christian charity", arguing that Jews had their own international charity organizations. Nevertheless, Żegota was run by both Jews and non-Jews from a wide range of political movements. Julian Grobelny, an activist in the prewar Polish Socialist Party, was elected as General Secretary, and Ferdynand Arczyński – a member of the Polish Democratic Party – as treasurer. Adolf Berman and Leon Feiner represented the Jewish National Committee (an umbrella group representing the Zionist parties) and the Marxist General Jewish Labour Bund. Both parties operated independently, channeling funds donated by Jewish organizations abroad to Żegota and other underground operations. Other members included the Polish Socialist Party, the Democratic Party (Stronnictwo Demokratyczne) and the Catholic Front for the Rebirth of Poland (Front Odrodzenia Polski) led by Kossak-Szczucka and Witold Bieńkowski, editors of its underground publications. The right-wing National Party (Stronnictwo Narodowe) refused to take part in the organization.

== Operations ==
Żegota had specialized departments for issues such as clothing, children's welfare, medical care, housing and other relevant issues. It had around one hundred cells that provided food, medical care, money, and false identification documents to thousands of Polish Jews hiding in the "Aryan" side of the German occupation zone. Creation and distribution of false documents has been described as one of the organization's major tasks, and it is estimated to have produced up to a hundred sets of false identities for Jewish refugees. Another estimate credits Żegota with forging about 50,000 documents such as marriage certificates, baptismal records, death certificates and employment cards to help Jews pass off as Christians. In forging documents, Żegota cooperated with the Home Army, which often provided facilities for forging German identification papers.

The organization headquarters was located in Warsaw at 24 Żurawia Street. Żegota was active chiefly in Warsaw, but it also provided money, food, and medicines for prisoners in several forced-labor camps, as well as to refugees in Kraków, Wilno (Vilnius), and Lwów (L'viv). Żegota's activities overlapped to a considerable extent with those of the other major organizations dedicated to helping Jews in Poland – namely the Jewish National Committee, which cared for some 5,600 Jews; and the Bund, which cared for an additional 1,500. Together, the three organizations were able to reach some 8,500 of the 28,000 Jews hiding in Warsaw, and perhaps another 1,000 hiding elsewhere in Poland.

Żegota's children's section in Warsaw, headed by a Polish social worker Irena Sendler, cared for 2,500 Jewish children. Many were placed with foster families, in public orphanages, church orphanages, and convents.

Żegota repeatedly asked the Polish Government-in-Exile and the Government Delegation for Poland to appeal to the Polish people to help the persecuted Jews. The Government in Exile gradually increased its funding for Żegota throughout the war.

Richard C. Lukas estimated that 60,000, or about half of the Jews who survived the Holocaust in occupied Poland (such estimates vary), were aided in some shape or form by Żegota. Czesław Łuczak estimates the number of aid recipients at about 30,000. Paul R. Bartrop estimated that Żegota helped to save about 4,000 Jews and provided assistance to about 25,000 in total.

== Challenges ==
Under the German occupation, hiding or assisting Jewish refugees was punishable by death. However, it was no less dangerous due to the risk posed by fellow Poles, some of whom did not see kindly lending help for Jews. Irena Sendler is quoted as saying "during [the war] it was simpler to hide a tank under the carpet than shelter a Jewish child."

According to Richard C. Lukas, "The number of Poles who perished at the hands of the Germans for aiding Jews" is difficult to establish, with estimates ranging from several thousand to as high as fifty thousand. Paul R. Bartrop estimated that about 20,000 Żegota operatives were killed by the Nazis, and thousands of others were arrested and imprisoned.

=== Financial situation ===
The Polish Government-in-Exile, based in London, faced immense difficulties funding its institutions in German-occupied Poland; this affected funding for Żegota as well. Part of the funds had to be sent in via highly inefficient airdrops (only some 17% of which succeeded) and some could only be delivered late in the war.

Despite these difficulties, throughout the war, the Polish Government-in-Exile continually increased its funding for Żegota: the Polish Government's monthly support was increased from 30,000 zlotys to zl 338,000 in May 1944, and to zl 1,000,000 by war's end. The Polish Government's overall financial contribution to Żegota and Jewish organizations came to zl 37,400,000, US$1,000,000, and SFr 200,000 (see financial details below). According to Marcin Urynowicz, the percentage of the funds allocated by the Polish Government-in-Exile to help Jews, including through Żegota, was based on their percentage in Poland's prewar general population.

Antony Polonsky writes that "Zegota's successes—it was able to forge false documents for some 50,000 persons—suggest that, had it been given a higher priority by the Delegatura and the government in London, it could have done much more." Polonsky quotes Władysław Bartoszewski as saying that the organization was considered a "stepchild" of the underground; and Emanuel Ringelblum, who wrote that "a Council for Aid to the Jews was formed, consisting of people of good will, but its activity was limited by lack of funds and lack of help from the government." A similar description is given by historian Martin Winstone, who writes that Żegota fought an uphill battle for funding and received more support from Jewish organizations than from the Polish Government-in-Exile. He also notes that the Polish right-wing parties completely refused to support it. Shmuel Krakowski described the funding as "modest", and writes that the Polish government could have allocated more to funding the organization. He writes that "[the funding] was indeed very little considering not only the needs of the council and the immensity of the Jewish tragedy but also the resources at the Polish underground's disposal... they could have been much more generous in allocating resources needed to save human lives."

Joseph Kermish describes the relationship between Żegota and the Government Delegation for Poland as strained, with frequent disagreements about funding and the extent of the humanitarian crisis Żegota was trying to address.

It has been estimated that the cost of saving one Jewish life was around 6,000–15,000 Polish zloties.

Funds allocated by the Government Delegation for Poland
Allocated to	Date	Sum	Type	Notes
Żegota	May 1943 – Feb. 1944	6,250,000 zł	total	
Żegota	Jan. 1943 – May 1944	11,250,000 zł	total	According to Witold Bieńkowski
Żegota	Before May 1944	30,000 zł	monthly	
Żegota	After May 1944	338,000 zł	monthly	
Żegota	Nov. 1944 – Dec. 1944	14,000,00 zł	total	Allotted to help 1,500–1,800 Jews hiding on Warsaw's left bank
Żegota	Nov. 1944 – Dec. 1944	$32,000	n/a	
Żegota	March 1945 – April 1945	$65,000	n/a	
Żegota	By Sept. 1945	1,000,000 zł	monthly	
Żegota	1939–1945	$250,000	total	Sum of all funds allocated to Żegota expressed in USD
All Jewish organizations	1939–1945	37,400,000 zł $1,000,000 200,000 CHF	total	Combined total, including the funds allocated to Żegota
All organizations	1939–1945	$35,000,000 DM 20,000,000	total	Based on partial data – actual figure probably higher

== Prominent activists ==
In a letter from 26 February 1977 Adolf Berman mentions the following activists as especially meritorious:

- Tadeusz Bilewicz
- Janina Buchholtz-Bukolska
- Maria Derwisz-Parnowska
- Mieczysław Dobrowolski
- Regina Fleszarowa
- Henryka Gorzkowska
- Maria Grzegorzewska
- Irena Kurowska
- Maria Laska
- Stanisław and Maria Ossowscy
- Zofia Rodziewicz
- Ewa Rybicka
- Sylwia Rzeczycka
- Irena Sawicka
- Stefania Sempołowska
- Irena Solska
- Jan Wesołowski
- Jan and Antonina Żabińscy

== Postwar recognition ==
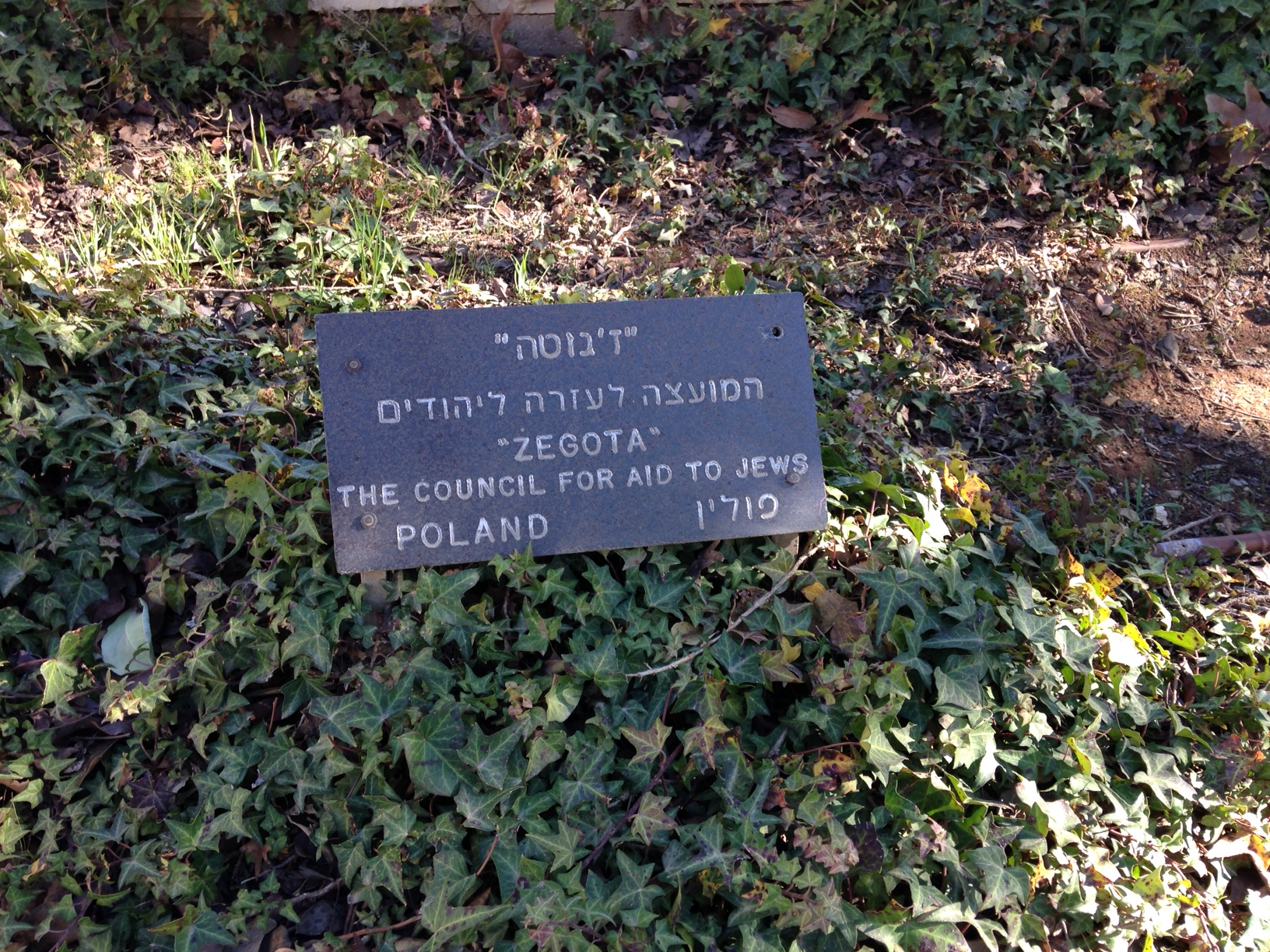
Żegota plaque, Yad Vashem, Jerusalem, Israel

In 1963 Żegota was commemorated in Israel with the planting of a tree in the Avenue of the Righteous at Yad Vashem, with Władysław Bartoszewski present. In 1995 a monument to the organization was unveiled in Warsaw. Another monument was unveiled in 2009 in the Survivors' Park in Łódź. Żegota is also commemorated in plaques at places of its regional offices in Warsaw and Kraków. In 2009 a commemorative series of coins was issued by the National Bank of Poland.

== See also ==
- List of Żegota members
- Rescue of Jews by Poles during the Holocaust
- Aleksander Ładoś
- History of the Jews in Poland
- Timeline of Jewish-Polish history
- Polish resistance movement in World War II
- Occupation of Poland (1939–45)

== Notes and references ==
Specific

General

- Andrzej Krzysztof Kunert, Andrzej Friszke (ed.). "Żegota" Rada Pomocy Żydom 1942–1945 (in Polish). Warsaw: Rada Ochrony Pamięci Walk i Męczeństwa. ISBN 83-916666-0-3.
- Joshua D. Zimmerman, ed. (2003). Contested Memories: Poles and Jews During the Holocaust and Its Aftermath. Rutgers University Press. p. 336. ISBN 0-8135-3158-6.
- MS Nechama Tec (1986). When Light Pierced the Darkness: Christian Rescue of Jews in Nazi-occupied Poland. Oxford: Oxford University Press. ISBN 0-19-505194-7. "Zegota."
- Tadeusz Piotrowski (1997). Poland's Holocaust. McFarland & Company. ISBN 0-7864-0371-3.
- Gunnar S. Paulsson (2002). Secret City: The Hidden Jews of Warsaw, 1940-1945. Yale: Yale University Press. pp. 2002. ISBN 0-300-09546-5.
- Irene Tomaszewski; Tecia Werbowski (1994). Zegota: The Rescue of Jews in Wartime Poland. Montreal: Price-Patterson.
- Irene Tomaszewski; Tecia Werbowski (1994). Zegota: The Council to Aid Jews in Occupied Poland 1942–1945. Price-Patterson. ISBN 1-896881-15-7.
