= Front for the Rebirth of Poland =

WWII anti-fascist organization

Front for a Reborn Poland
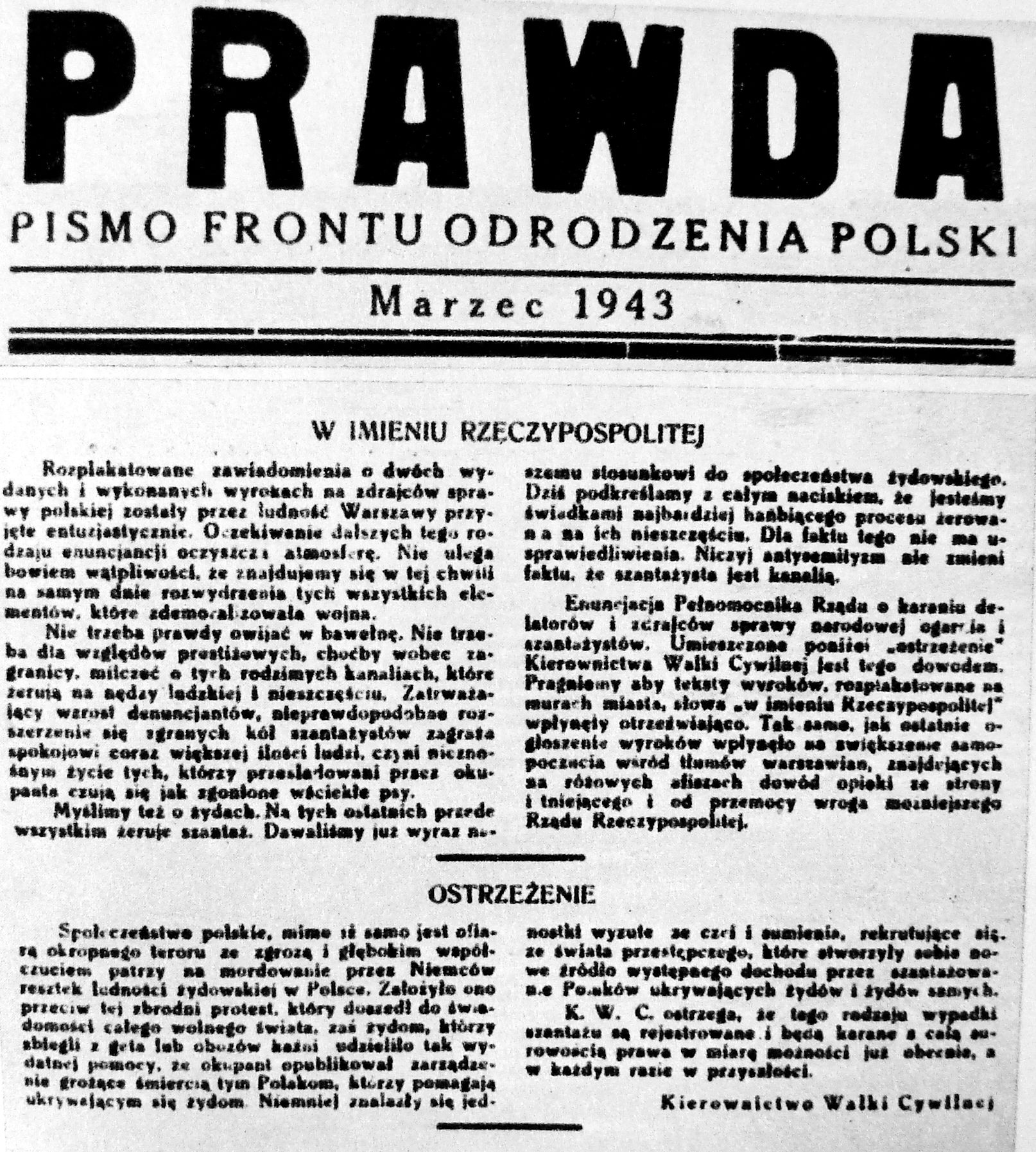
- The Prawda newspaper, 1943, of the Front for the Rebirth of Poland, warning of death sentences for the denunciations of Jews and their Polish rescuers
- Formation: 1941
- Founder: Zofia Kossak-Szczucka, Father Edmund Krauze
- Type: Underground organization
- Headquarters: Warsaw
- Region served: occupied Poland

Front for the Rebirth of Poland also translated as the Front for a Reborn Poland (Polish: Front Odrodzenia Polski, FOP) was a clandestine anti-Fascist organization formed in 1941 in occupied Poland during World War II, by a group of secular Catholics of Warsaw led by Zofia Kossak-Szczucka and Father Edmund Krauze. The Front upheld Christian ideals of the prewar Catholic Action movements existing in the Polish Second Republic as part of the cross national European groupings of lay Catholics.

== History ==
The Front for a Reborn Poland (FOP) published its own publication called Prawda (The Truth), edited by Witold Bieńkowski who took active part in the organization of Żegota in the autumn of 1942. He was put in charge of the Jewish and prisoner sections of Żegota in February 1943 on behalf of the Delegatura. The editor-in-chief was novelist Zofia Kossak-Szczucka who, until then, co-edited another underground paper called Polska Żyje (Poland Lives) already since the invasion of Poland in 1939. Kossak-Szczucka, code-name 'Weronika', published her famous "Protest" in The Truth publication in the summer of 1942. Both Bieńkowski and Kossak-Szczucka as well as Wanda Krahelska-Filipowicz worked in Żegota as representatives from the Front for a Reborn Poland (FOP).
