= Zofia Stryjeńska =

Polish artist

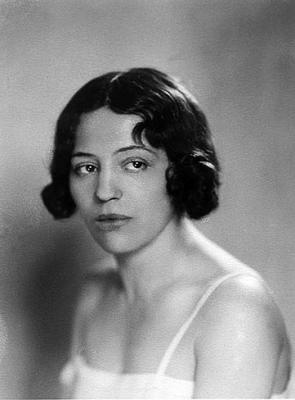
- Born: Zofia Lubańska; 13 May 1891; Kraków, Grand Duchy of Kraków, Austria-Hungary
- Died: 28 February 1976 (aged 84); Geneva, Switzerland
- Writing career
- Notable work: Bread Almost Every Day (memoir)

Zofia Stryjeńska (née Lubańska; 13 May 1891 – 28 February 1976) was a Polish painter, graphic designer, illustrator, stage designer, and a representative of art deco. Along with Olga Boznańska and Tamara de Lempicka, she was one of the best-known Polish women artists of the interwar period. In the 1930s she was nominated for the prestigious Golden Laurel of the Polish Academy of Literature, but declined the offer.

== Biography ==
Stryjeńska was the oldest of 6 children of Franciszek Lubański. As a child, she often drew and painted. She first attended a craft school, then a teacher's seminary, and until 1909 Leonard Stroynowski's private art school. In 1909 she started to study painting at the Maria Niedzielska fine art school for women. She graduated in 1911 with honors for painting and applied art. In 1910 she joined her father on a trip to Italy via Austria-Hungary, during which they visited galleries and museums in Vienna and Venice. As a young girl she worked for magazines such as "Role" and "Voice of the People".

On October 1, 1911, she was admitted to the Academy of Fine Arts, Munich; only 40 of around 200 applicants were taken. She used the name of her brother, Tadeusz Grzymała Lubański and dressed like a boy because at the time, the academy did not accept women. After a year, her fellow students started to become suspicious. She returned to Kraków, where she worked on painting and literature. Her first artistic success came in 1912, when the Kraków Society of Friends of Fine Art included 18 of her watercolour illustrations of Polish Fables in its exhibition.

In May 1913, Jerzy Warchałowski, art critic of the Polish magazine "Time", discussed Sophia Lubański extensively, making her well known and launching her career. At that time, the family moved to bohemian Kraków, where she met Zelenski, Zdzisław Jachimecki, Puszetów and Wojciech Kossak. She became friends with Magdalena Samozwaniec and her sister Maria Pawlikowska-Jasnorzewska.

=== Interwar period ===
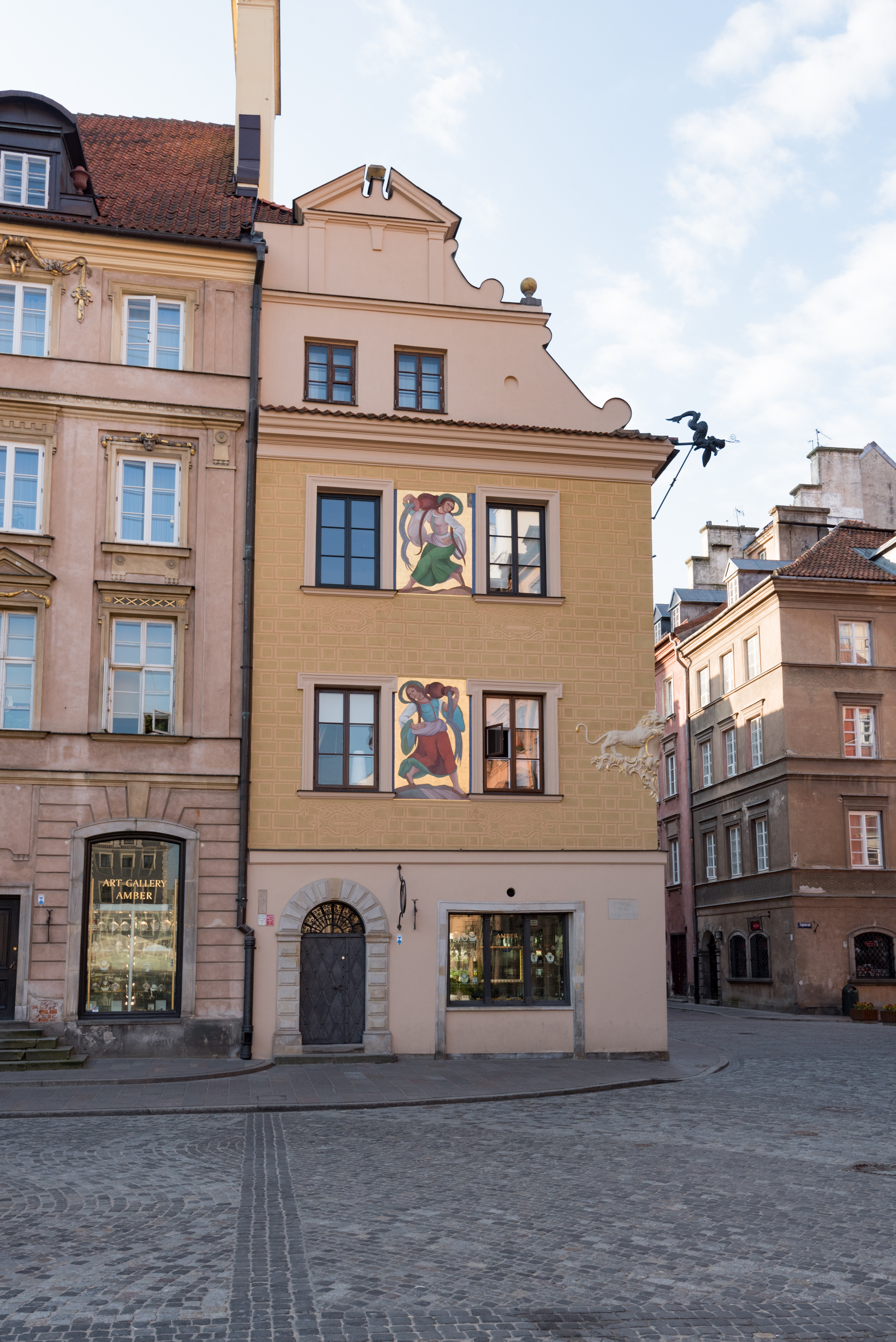
A historic tenement house at Warsaw Old Town Market Place with frescoes painted by Stryjeńska

On 4 November 1916 Zofia married Karol Stryjeński, an architect of the Zakopane style. They had three children: daughter Magda and twins Jacek and Jan. Stryjeński introduced his wife to his friends, artists and representatives of world literature. She met, among others, Władysław Skoczylas, Henryk Kune, Stefan Żeromski, Władysław Reymont, Stanisław Ignacy Witkiewicz and later several poets of the Skamander group.

In the period 1921 – 1927, she lived in Zakopane, where her husband worked as a director of the School for the Wood Industry. This period, started out happy and with abundant creativity. However, over the years she became more and more estranged from Karol, which eventually led to open conflict and divorce in 1927. Karol died in 1932.

After the divorce, she moved to Warsaw, where in 1929 she married actor Artur Klemens Socha. The marriage was soon ended, as she discovered that he suffered from syphilis. By the end of the 1930s she was connected, also for a short time, with the architect and bon vivant Achilles Brez and then with the traveller and writer Arkady Fiedler.

In the first half of the 1930s she was a forgotten artist. Stryjeńska did not want to seek recognition. She desperately needed money, as she sold few paintings. Only in 1938 did she receive several orders from the Polish Ministry of Foreign Affairs, including one for a kilim for the Emperor of Japan Hirohito. She took part in the interior decoration of the Polish passenger ships "Batory"and "Pilsudski" and the interior decoration of Wedel's cafe. People started buying her paintings of Slavic and historical themes again.

She spent the second world war in Kraków. In 1943 she discovered she had syphilis, which affected her eyes so that at times she could not paint. In the beginning of 1945 the Russians entered the city, instituting a communist regime. Stryjeńska decided to leave Poland. She joined her children in Geneva. After many years in Paris, she settled in Geneva, where her daughter and her sons lived. She tried to go to the U.S., seeking help from the Kosciuszko Foundation. However, the Board of the Foundation rejected her. She continued to live very modestly in Geneva, helped by her children. She remained emotionally connected with Poland and the Polish culture, Switzerland remained a foreign country to her. She died on 28 February 1976 in Geneva at the age of 84 and was buried in the local Chêne-Bourg cemetery.

== Artwork ==
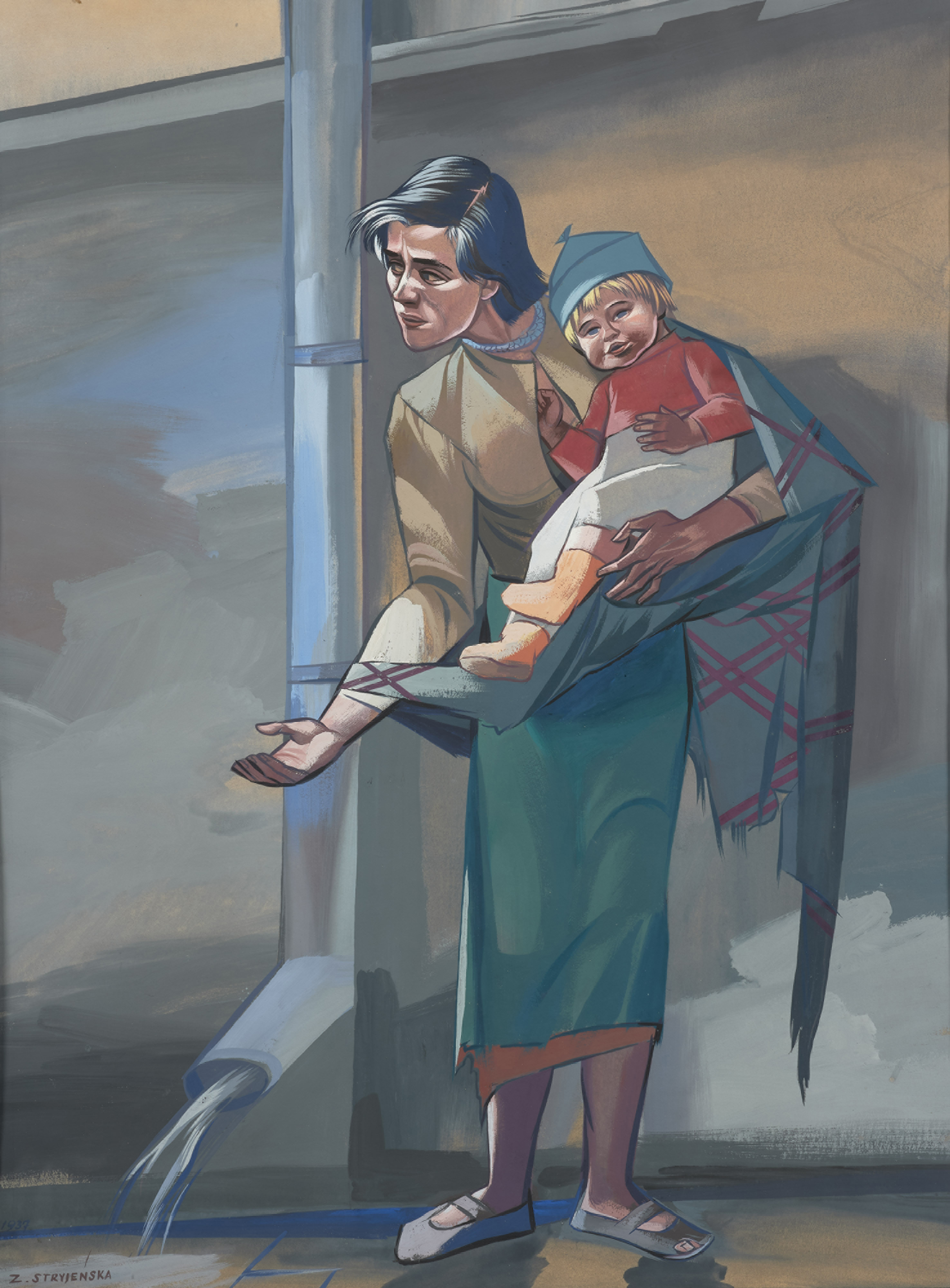
Zofia Stryjeńska, Beggar with Child, 1937

Stryjeńska was part of the art group "Rytm" (rhythm). She may also have been influenced by Young Poland (Młoda Polska), a stylistically diverse art movement active between 1890 and 1918. She mainly used the tempera technique, producing lithographs, drawings, posters, designing toys, tapestry, stage sets, stage costumes and making book illustrations.

Among her best known works are: Pastorałka, Slavic Idols cycle and Passover, as well as illustrations of the poem "Monachomachii" by bishop Krasicki, Seasons, Christmas Carols, Four Polish Dances, and the sacraments.

She made part of the decoration of the Polish pavilion at the Exposition Internationale des Arts Decoratifs et Industriels Modernes in Paris in 1925, a series of six paintings for the twelve months, showing rural village life and seasonal change. This work brought her Europe-wide fame and five World Trade awards. She made a series of paintings depicting Polish folk dance artists in 1927.

In many works, she depicting the pre-Christian Slavic gods worshipped in Poland. However, the artist herself always considered herself a Christian. She was raised as a Catholic, but converted for a short time to the Evangelical Church in order to divorce and remarry. Her fascination with the beliefs of ancient Slavs should be regarded as an artistic interest only.

== Writing ==
Stryjeńska wanted to give her children a good education. She wrote a handbook on the etiquette of her time, using the pseudonym "Professor Hilar". Her memoir Bread Almost Every Day was published in 1995. Her writing is characterized by free flowing language and a rich vocabulary .

== Recognition ==
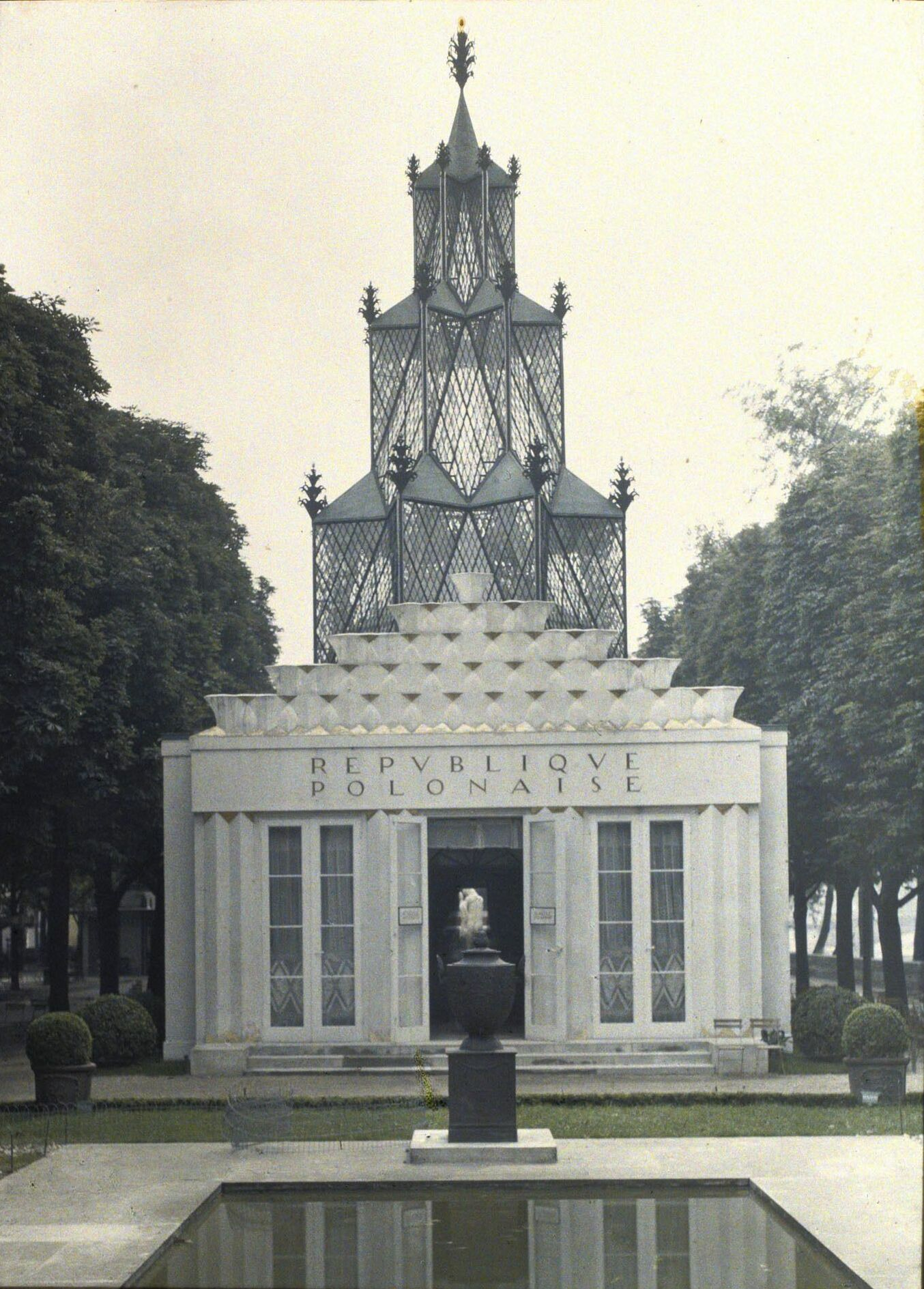
Poland's pavilion in Paris in 1925 was decorated by Zofia Stryjeńska.

Mieczyslaw Grydzewski nicknamed her "her royal highness, the princess of Polish art" in "Literary News". In 1930 the government gave her its highest award, Polonia Restituta. in 1936 the Polish Academy of Literature awarded her the Gold Academic Wreath for her contribution to Polish art in general. After the second world war, she refused to join the communist-run Polish Writers' Union. Therefore, official policy was to ignore her as an artist and systematically call her insignificant. Yet, the government widely reproduced her art without paying her royalties. She did not complain about the missed income, but deplored the low quality of the reproductions. In 1974, the US-based Alfred Jurzykowski Foundation presented her an award. Only in 1989 was she rehabilitated in Poland and recognized again as a great Polish artist. In 1991, Maria Gronska presented her work in a monograph. In 2008, the National Museum in Kraków organized a great retrospective exhibition of the work of Stryjeńska. In 2009, the exhibition visited the National Museum in Poznan and the National Museum in Warsaw . The exhibition was accompanied by a richly illustrated catalogue and bibliography, edited by Svyatoslav Lenartowicz, curator of the exhibition. In 2011, Stryjeńska was the subject of a 2 zloty Polish commemorative coin.

On May 13, 2021, Google celebrated her 130th birthday with a Google Doodle.

== See also ==
- List of Polish painters
- List of Poles
