= Gloria Kossak =

Polish painter and poet

Gloria Kossak (1941–1991), Polish painter and poet, was a daughter of painter Jerzy Kossak and granddaughter of another renowned Polish painter, Wojciech Kossak, himself the son of Juliusz Kossak, the progenitor of the entire Kossak family of artists and writers, and precursor of a Polish school of battle-scene painting.

== Life ==
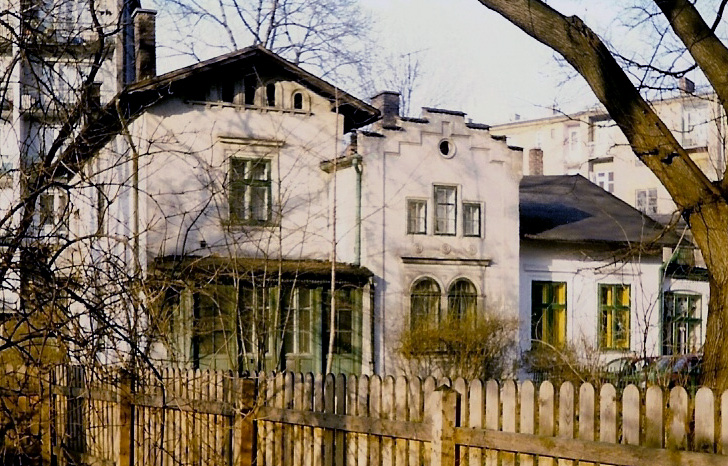
Kossakówka manor

Gloria Kossak was born in Kraków under the Nazi German occupation of Poland. During the postwar years, she lived with her mother and sister, Simona Kossak, at their family manor, the legendary Kossakówka, built in 1897, in metropolitan Kraków. They were constantly harassed by the communist authorities (the father, Jerzy Kossak, died before the end of Stalinism, in 1955). Their garden was confiscated and built on, and their electric power was cut back.

Afflicted by poverty, Gloria Kossak nevertheless managed to save the manor from the Kraków authorities' attempts to demolish it. The privately owned manor is, however, said to have deteriorated beyond repair.
