= Kossakówka =

Historic monument in Poland

Kossakówka Manor House
- Kossakówka
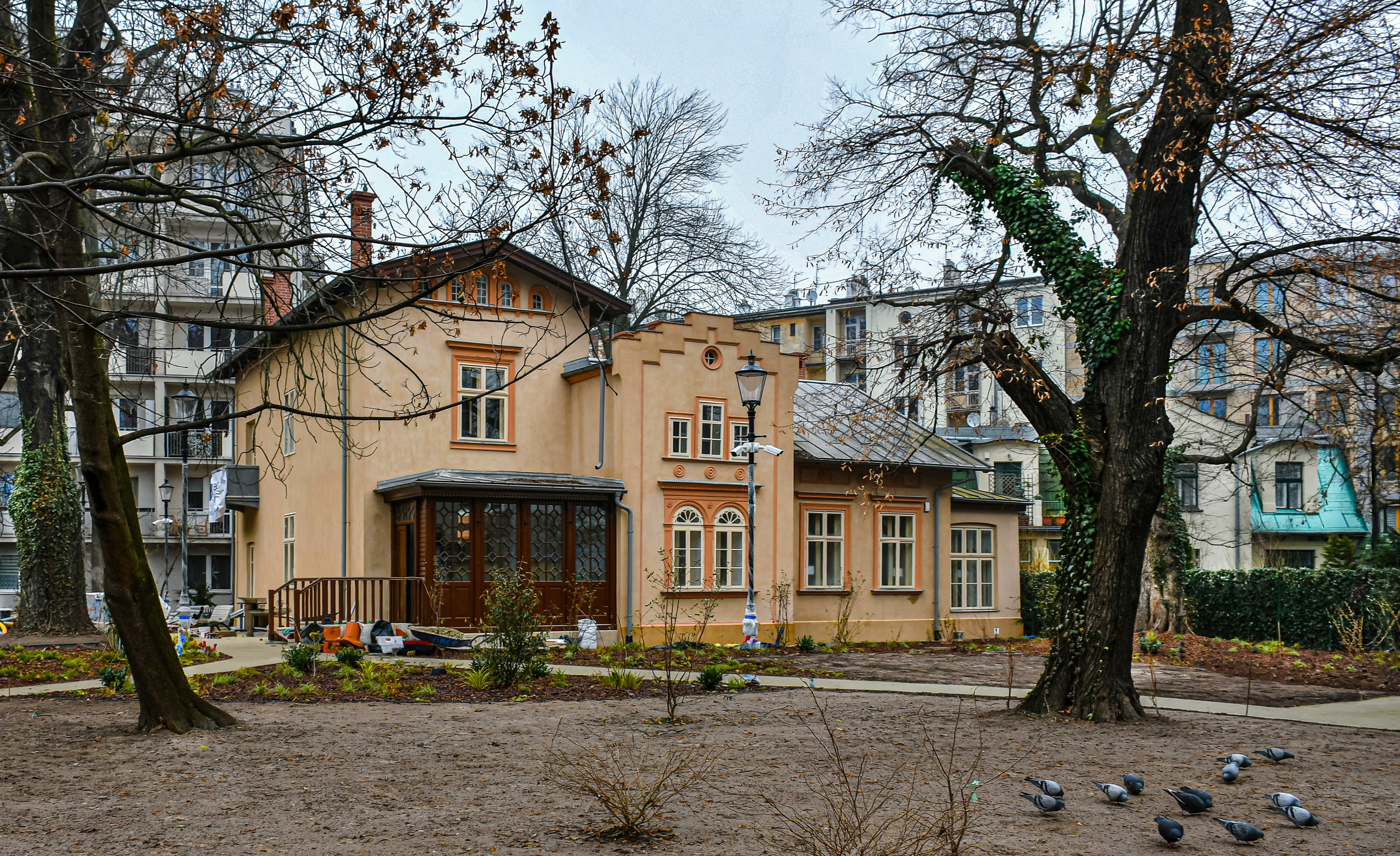
- Location: 4 J. Kossaka Square; Kraków; Poland
- Coordinates: 50°03′24.3″N 19°55′38.6″E
- Website

Historic Monument of Poland
- Designated: 1994-09-08
- Part of: Kraków historical city complex
- Reference no.: M.P. 1994 nr 50 poz. 418

Kossakówka Manor House is the historic home of the Kossak family located at 4 Juliusza Kossaka Square in Nowy Świat, the former district of Kraków, Poland.

== History ==
The villa was built for W. Kołodziejski in 1851, designed by Jan Bogumił Trenner.

In 1871, Juliusz Kossak purchased the house and moved in with his wife and five children. Initially, the villa at Plac Latarnia (the square's name was changed after the painter's death in 1899) was called "Wygoda". Juliusz's wife and children lived there first, as the artist himself was in Munich, where he studied painting. The house consisted of two parts: one was designated for women (later, when only Mrs. Juliuszowa lived there, it was called "Grandma's House," and eventually "Jerzówka"). The entire property was surrounded by a garden, and its location on the outskirts of the city, near a park, made it a truly idyllic retreat for the artist Kossak. Here, he set up his studio and painted his works.

Kossakówka was always full of life. Until World War II, it was an open house for Kraków's intelligentsia and artistic circles. One could meet there: Adam Asnyk, Henryk Sienkiewicz, Stanisław Witkiewicz, Józef Chełmoński, Julian Fałat, Julian Tuwim, Boy (Tadeusz Żeleński-Boy), Joseph Conrad, Ignacy Paderewski, and many other renowned painters, musicians, writers, and actors.

In 1884, the villa was taken over by Juliusz's son, Wojciech. From then on, Kossakówka housed the studios of two outstanding Polish painters. The care of the family nest was taken over by the new Mrs. Kossakowa – Maria Wojciechowa, after Grandma Juliuszowa. Thus, Kossakówka became the family home for the next generation of this artistic family: Wojciech's children, Jerzy Kossak, Maria Pawlikowska-Jasnorzewska, and Magdalena Samozwaniec.

In 1942, after Wojciech's death, the house was taken over by his son Jerzy. After his sisters moved away, he lived there with Maria, his daughter from his first marriage, his second wife Elżbieta Dzięciołowska-Śmiałowska, and their daughters from the second marriage – Gloria and Simona.

After the war, Kossakówka faced the threat of demolition, but it was saved by the efforts of Elżbieta, Jerzy's wife, who persuaded Włodzimierz Sokorski (then Minister of Culture) to recognize Kossakówka as a national heritage site. In 1960, the manor was entered into the register of historical monuments and was renovated, but state protection ended there. In the 1980s, it began to decline.

The ruined villa was purchased from its owners by the city of Kraków, and plans are underway to establish a Museum of Art History there, with a separate exhibition dedicated to the history of the Kossak family.

On May 25, 1960 the historic home was entered into the Polish register of monuments. It is also entered into the municipal register of monuments of the Lesser Poland Voivodeship.

== Gallery ==
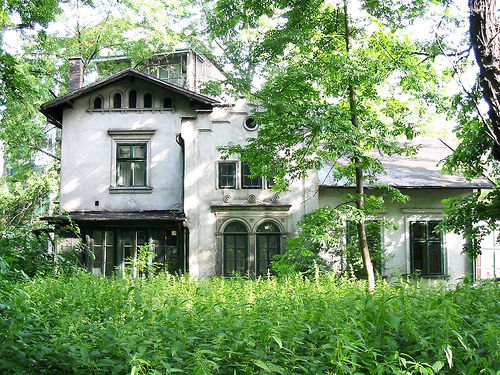
Kossakówka (2007)

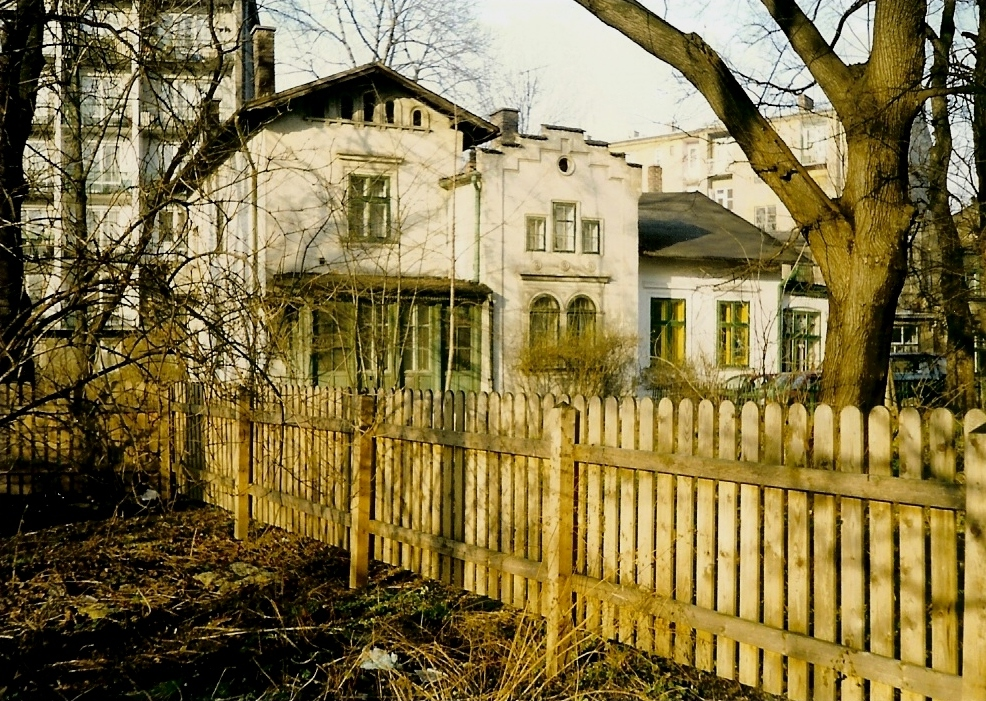
Kossakówka (2008)

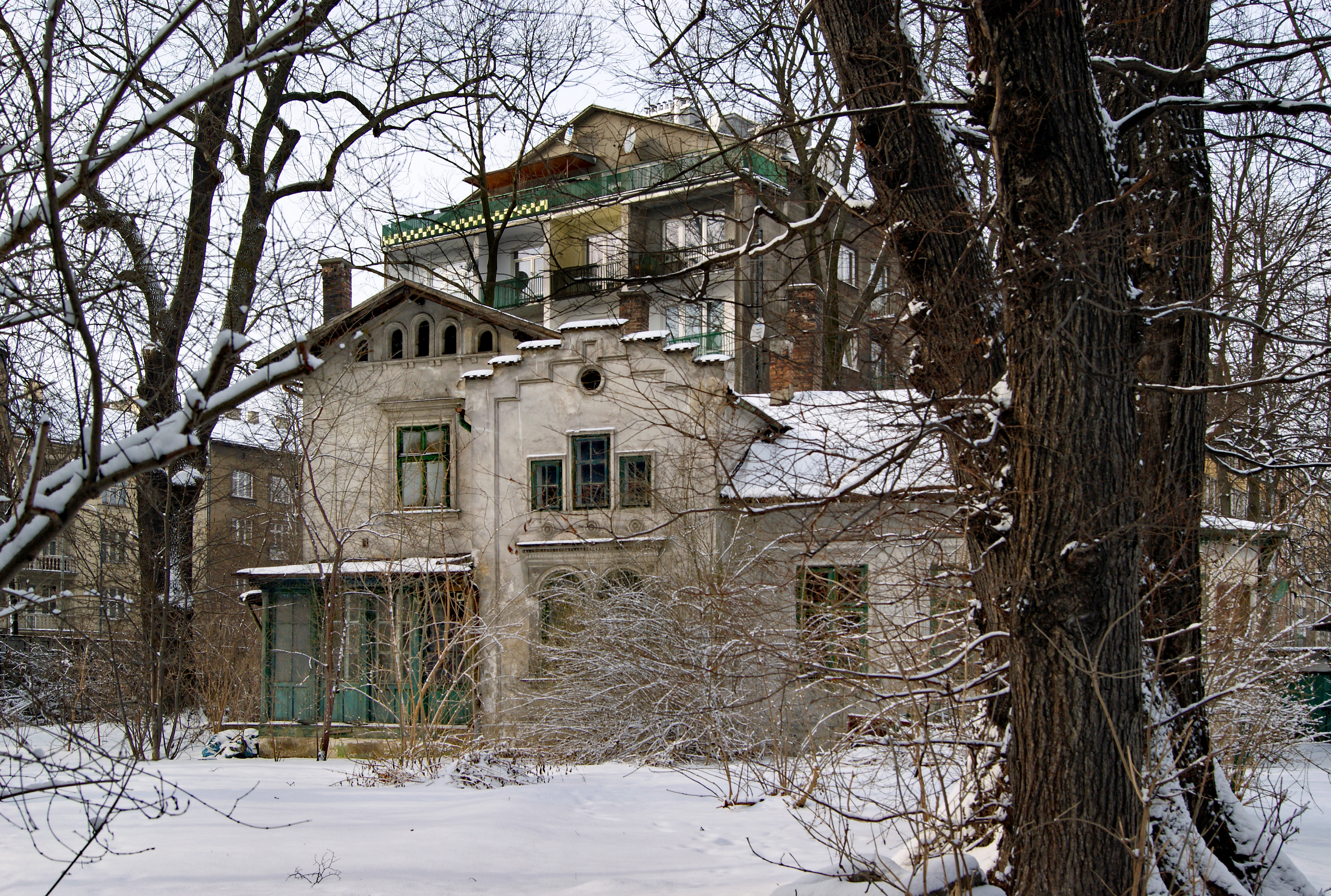
Kossakówka (2012)

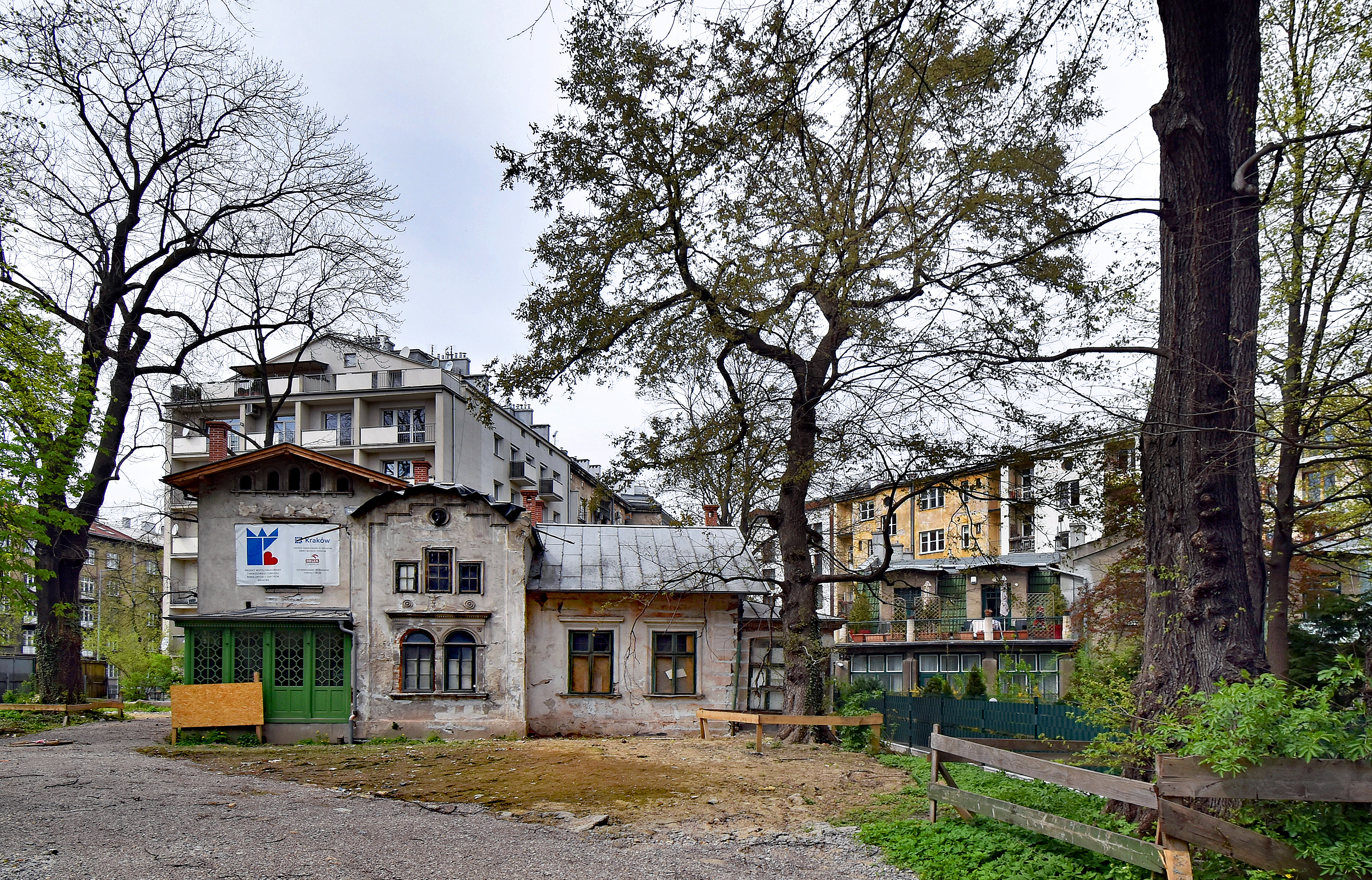
Kossakówka (IV 2022)
