= Kossak =

Kossak is a surname historically widespread in the land of Galicia, now divided between Poland and Ukraine. Notable people with this surname include members of a famous family of Polish artists, writers and poets:

- Juliusz Kossak (1824–99), Polish painter from the partitions period, progenitor of the Kossak family
  - Tadeusz Kossak (1857–1935), Polish army officer and freedom fighter
    - Zofia Kossak-Szczucka (1889–1968), novelist, daughter of Tadeusz Kossak
  - Wojciech Kossak (1857–1942), painter, son of Juliusz Kossak
    - Jerzy Kossak (1886–1955), painter, son of Wojciech Kossak
      - Gloria Kossak (1941–1991), painter and poet, daughter of Jerzy Kossak (1886–1955), sister of Simona Kossak
      - Simona Kossak (1943-2007), biologist, ecologist, and professor of forest sciences, daughter of Jerzy Kossak, sister of Gloria Kossak
    - Maria Pawlikowska-Jasnorzewska née Kossak (1891–1945), poet, second daughter of Wojciech Kossak
    - Magdalena Samozwaniec née Kossak (1894–1972), writer, third daughter of Wojciech Kossak
- Karol Kossak (1896–1975), painter and illustrator

Other notable bearers of the surname:

- Hryhoriy Kossak (1882-1939), commander of the Ukrainian Sich Riflemen and Ukrainian Galician Army
- Ivan Kossak (1879-1927), Ukrainian military officer, brother of Hryhoriy
- Mykhailo Kossak (activist) (c.1815-1890), Lviv burger and activist, head of the Stauropegion Institute's printing house
- Mykhailo Kossak (actor) (1874-1938), Ukrainian actor, brother of Vasyl Kossak
- Vasyl Kossak (1886-1932), Ukrainian actor
- Zenon Kossak (1907–1939), Ukrainian nationalist activist
- Kateryna Rubchakova (née Kossak, 1881-1919), Ukrainian actress

== See also ==
- Kozak (surname)
- Cossack (disambiguation)
