= Jerzy Kossak =

Polish realist painter (1886–1955)

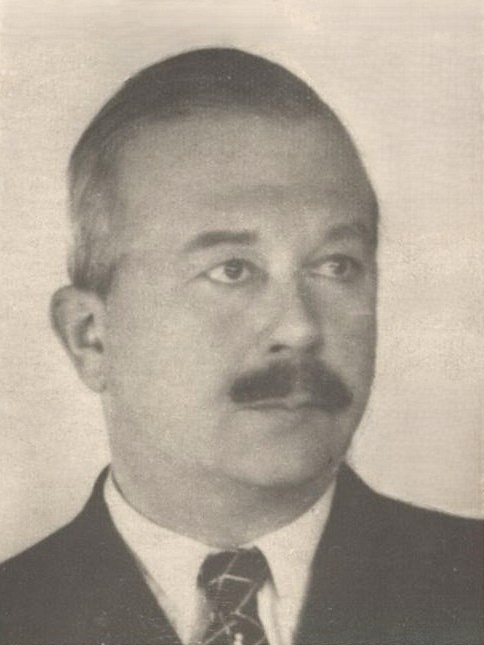
Photograph of Jerzy Kossak, c. 1950

Jerzy Maciej Kossak (Kraków, 11 September 1886 – 11 May 1955, Kraków) was a Polish realist painter specializing in military scenes. He was the son of painter Wojciech Kossak and grandson of painter Juliusz Kossak, a third-generation artist from a well-known and sought after family of painters, writers and poets.

== Artist ==
Jerzy Kossak was a prolific painter of mostly historic scenes featuring the famed Polish Uhlans on horses, usually sold on the spot, but also used for barter at times of the postwar economic slump, until his death before the end of Stalinism in Poland. His paintings, along with those of his ancestors, remain among the best-selling at Polish art auctions.

== Personal life ==
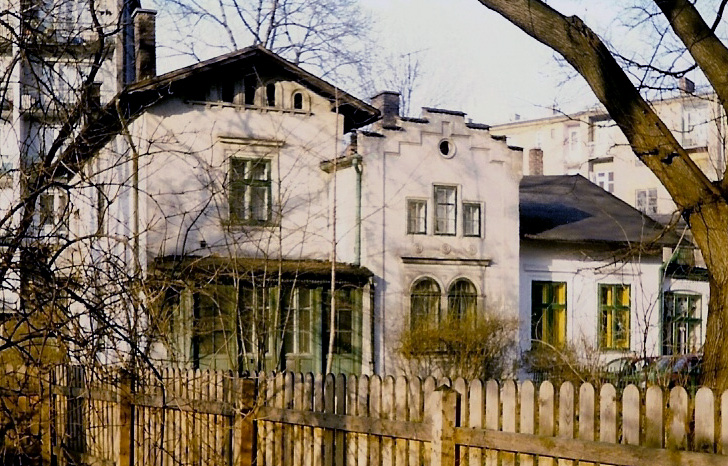
"Kossakówka" family manor

Jerzy Kossak was a brother of the poet Maria Pawlikowska-Jasnorzewska and of the novelist Magdalena Samozwaniec, as well as the father of biologist Simona Kossak and of painter Gloria Kossak. He resided at the historic family manor called "Kossakówka", in metropolitan Kraków.

He was married twice, first to Ewa Kossakowa (née Kaplińska), by whom he had two daughters, (one called Maria, born 1917), and then to Elżbieta Dzięciołowska-Śmiałowska, who was the mother of Simona and Gloria.

== See also ==
- Zofia Kossak-Szczucka (1889–1968), daughter of Tadeusz Kossak, the twin brother of Jerzy's father
- Kossak family; 4 generations of notable painters, writers and poets
- List of Poles
