= Juliusz Kossak =

Polish historical painter (1824–1899)

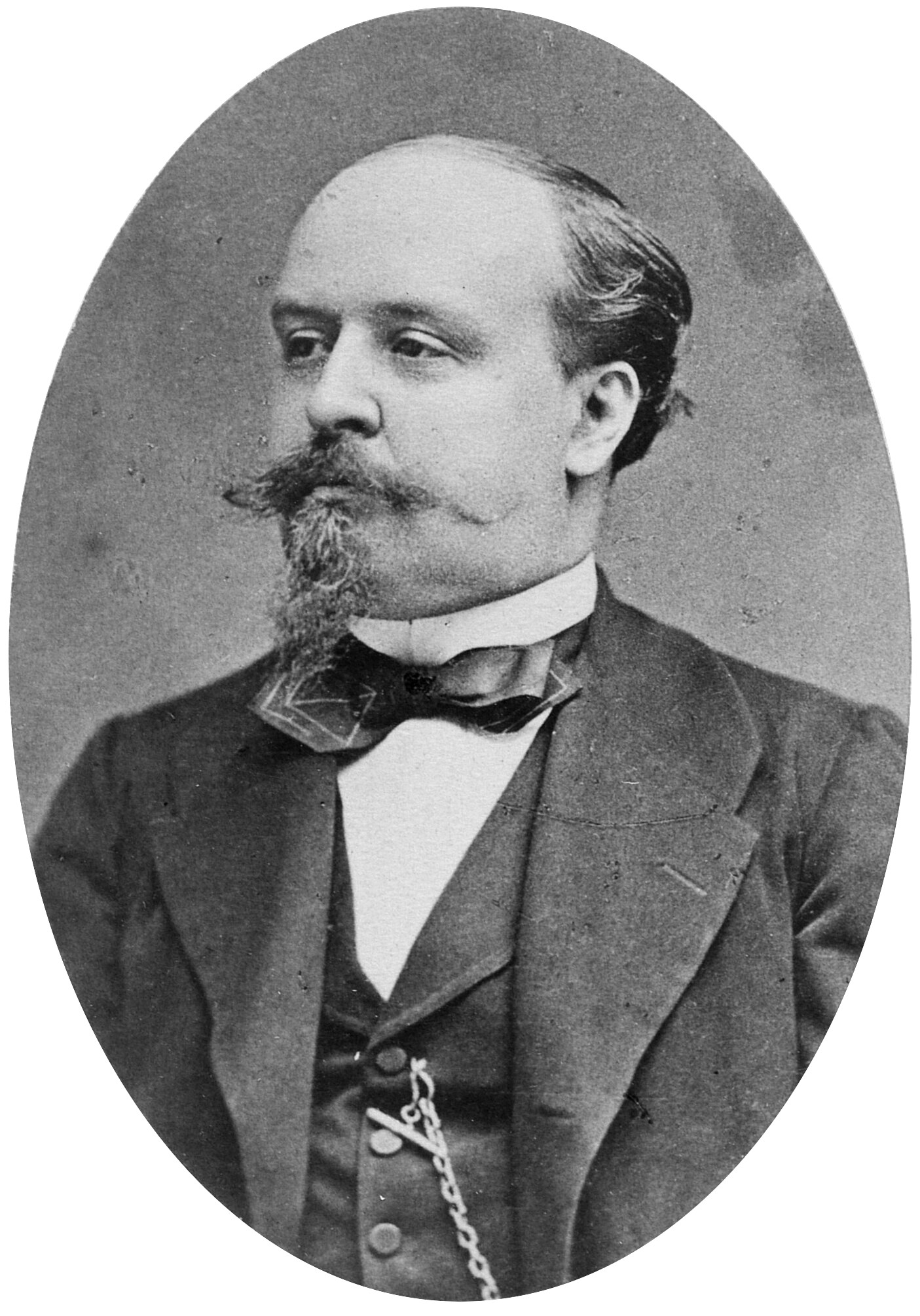
- Juliusz Kossak, before 1899
- Born: Juliusz Fortunat Kossak; 15 December 1824; Nowy Wiśnicz, Kingdom of Galicia and Lodomeria, Austrian Empire
- Died: 3 February 1899 (aged 74); Kraków, Kingdom of Galicia and Lodomeria, Cislethania, Austria-Hungary
- Known for: Painting, drawing
- Movement: History painting; battle scenes, military portraits and horses.

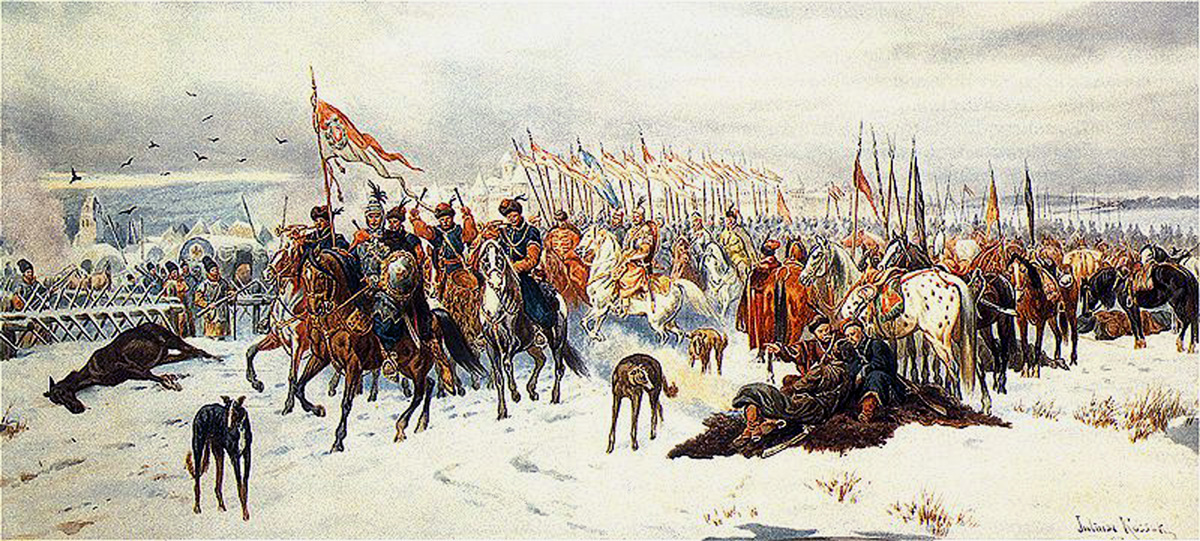
Juliusz Kossak, The Relief of Smolensk by Polish forces during the Polish–Muscovite War (1605–18). The painting reflects a historic period when Poles could face Russians on equal terms, unlike their subservient position in the painter's lifetime. Watercolor.

Juliusz Fortunat Kossak (15 December 1824 – 3 February 1899) was a Polish historical painter and master illustrator who specialized in battle scenes, military portraits and horses. He was the progenitor of an artistic family that spanned four generations, father of painter Wojciech Kossak and grandfather of painter Jerzy Kossak.

== Life ==
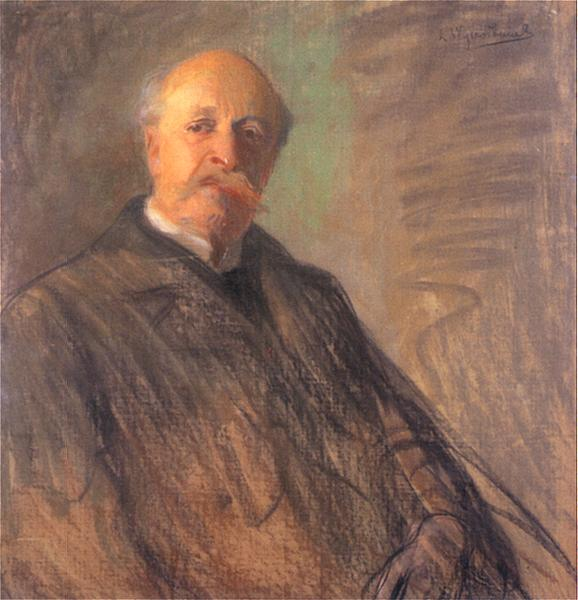
Juliusz Kossak, by Wyczółkowski

Juliusz Kossak grew up in Lwów (then known as Lemberg and ruled by Austria). He obtained a degree in law at the Lwów University encouraged by his mother. At the same time he studied painting with Jan Maszkowski and Piotr Michałowski. Beginning in 1844 Kossak worked on commissions for the local aristocracy in Małopolska, Podolia and Wolyn. He married Zofia Gałczyńska in 1855 and together they left for Paris where they spent five years. His sons were born there, the twin brothers: Wojciech and Tadeusz (on New Year's Eve 1856–1857) and the younger Stefan in 1858. The family came to Warsaw in 1860 where Kossak obtained a position as the head illustrator and engraver for Tygodnik Illustrowany magazine. They moved to Munich for a year and in 1868 settled in Kraków blessed with five children already. Kossak bought a small estate there, known as Kossakówka, famed for artistic and literary salon frequented by Adam Asnyk, Henryk Sienkiewicz, Stanisław Witkiewicz, Józef Chełmoński and many others. Juliusz Kossak lived and worked there till the end of his life. In 1880 he was awarded the Cross of Order of Merit by Emperor Franz Joseph of Austria-Hungary for his lifetime achievements as an artist.

== Work ==
Kossak exhibited his work on Polish soil and abroad since 1854. His preferred medium was watercolour, both in smaller and larger formats. He was the precursor of a Polish school of battle-scene painting, with his main subject matter revolving around what was of great concern to Poles opposing the military occupation of their country. He was the author of over a dozen panoramic paintings depicting Polish cavalry in battle and on military actions against foreign invaders.

Kossak produced also a series of portraits in oil for Polish noble families including Fredro, Gniewosz, Tyszkiewicz, Lipski and Morstin clan. His rustic and pastoral scenes included horse fairs, country weddings, winter hunting excursions, mythological scenes and horse stables. He also produces a series of illustrations of Polish epic literature such as Pan Tadeusz by Adam Mickiewicz, novels of Henryk Sienkiewicz, works by Wincenty Pol, Jan Chryzostom Pasek and others. He designed various honorary medals for Kraków foundries.

== Gallery ==
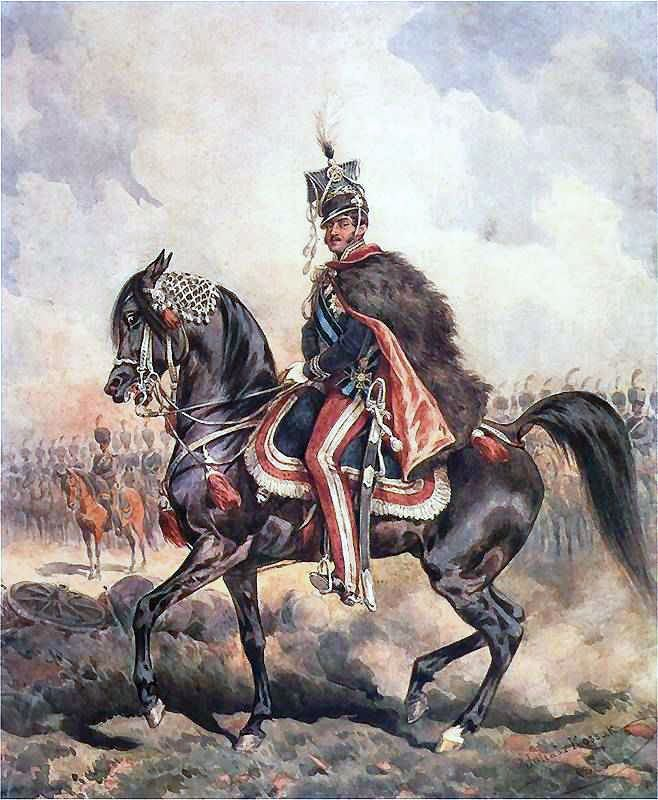
Prince Józef Poniatowski

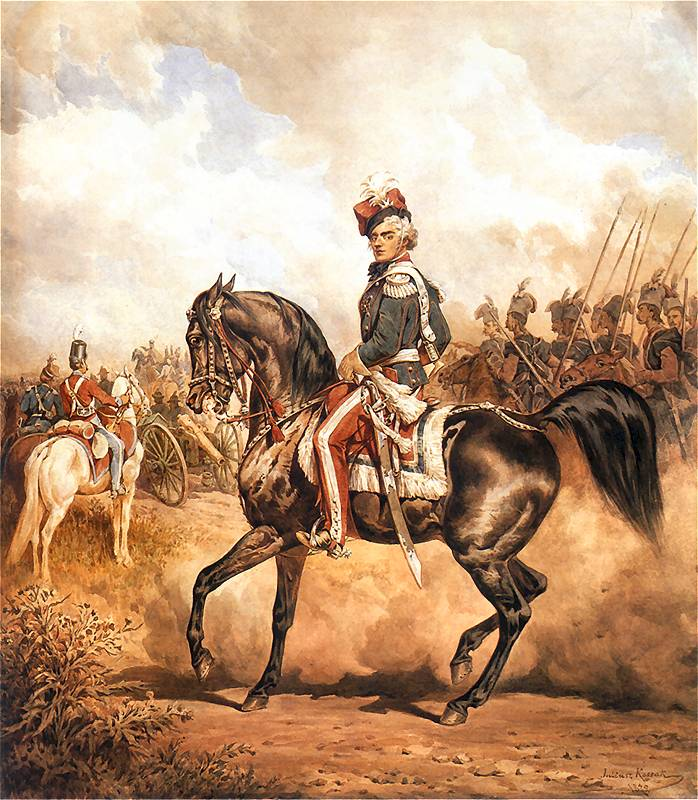
Prince Eustachy Erazm Sanguszko

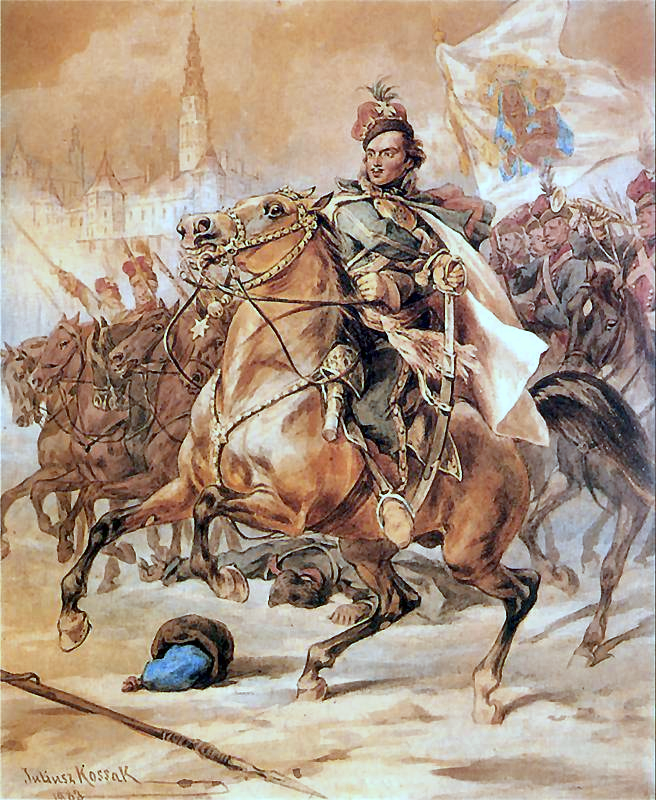
General Kazimierz Pułaski

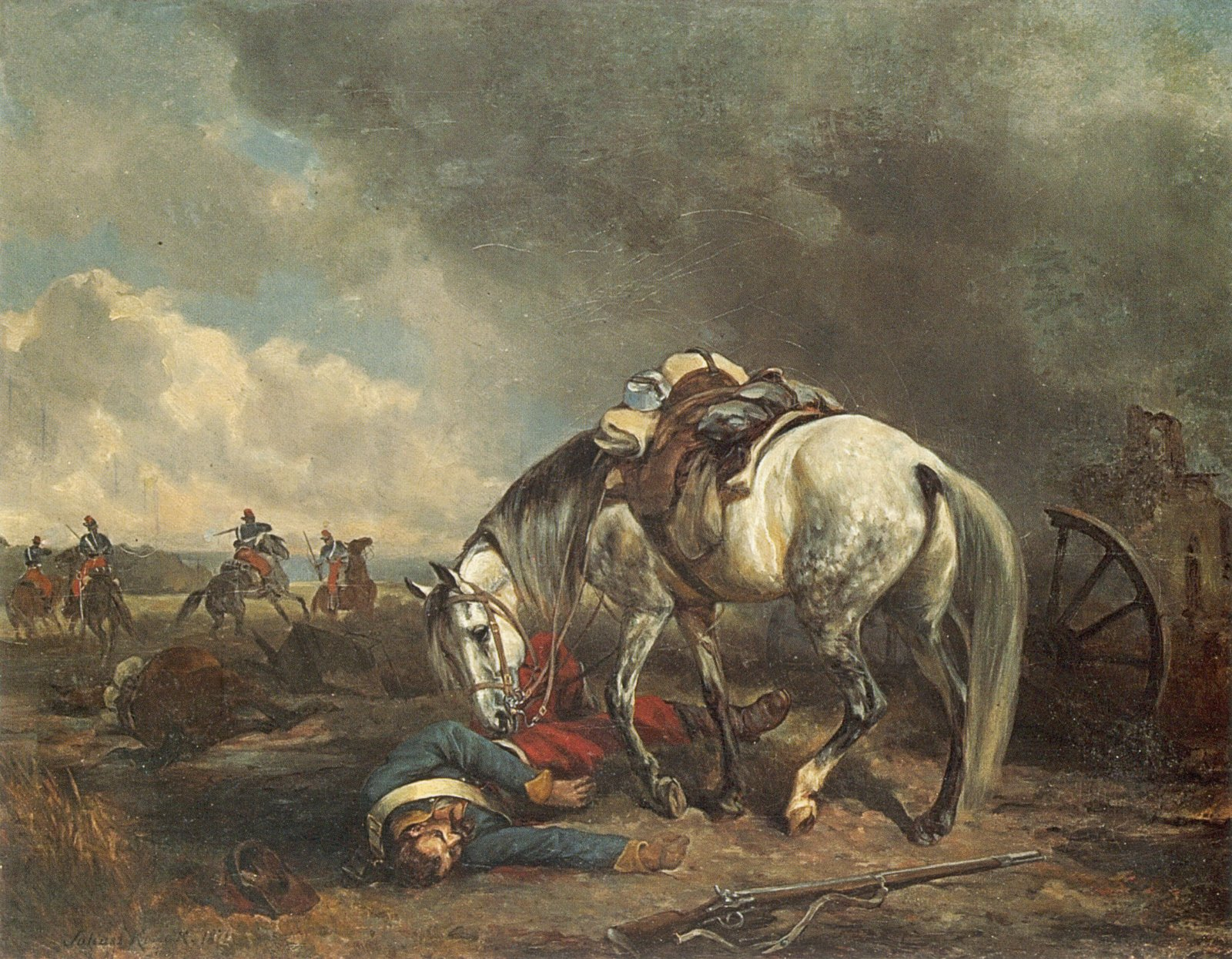
Faithful Companion

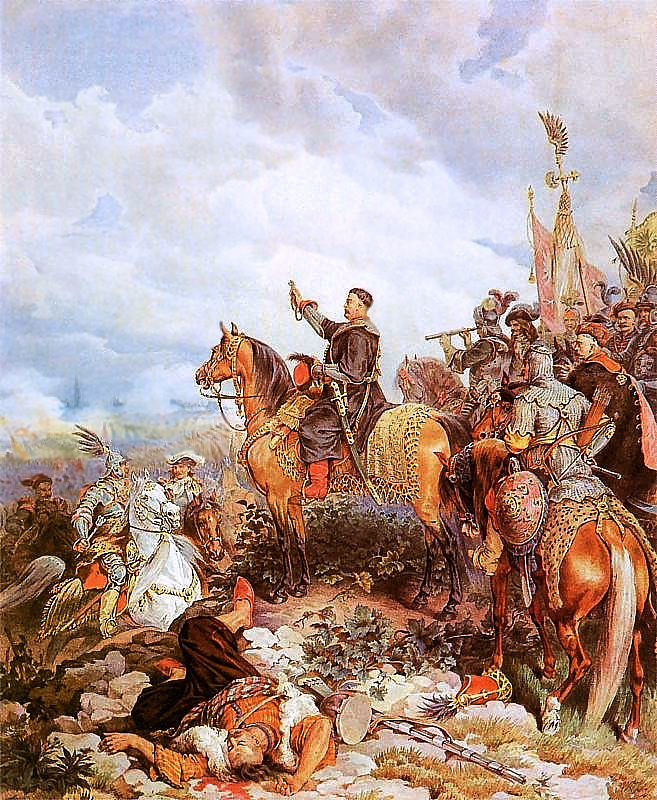
King John III Sobieski blessing Polish attack on Turks in Battle of Vienna in 1683

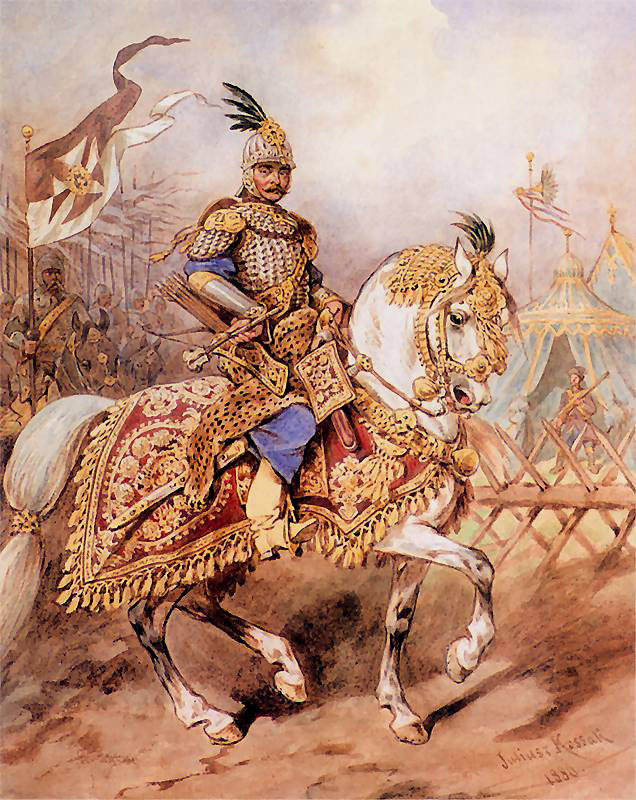
Rotmistrz Towarzysz pancerny

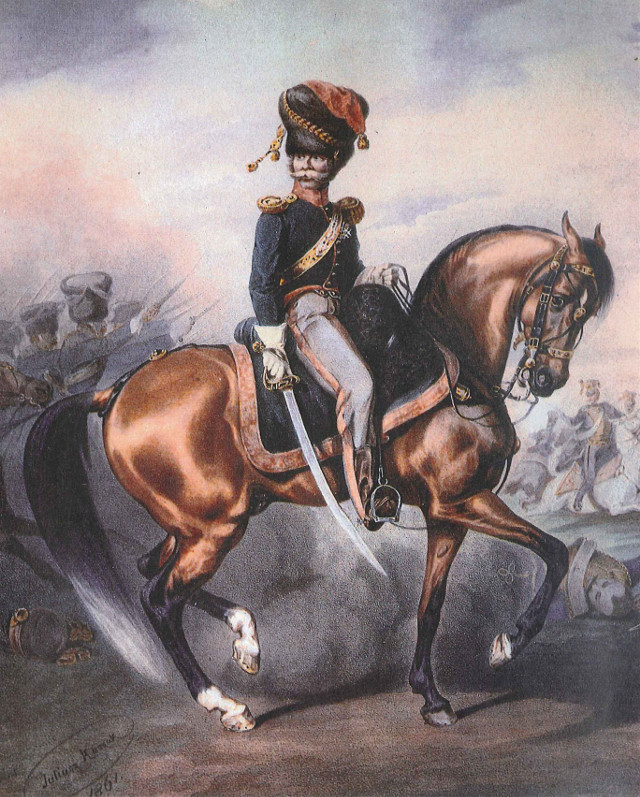
Colonel Berek Joselewicz

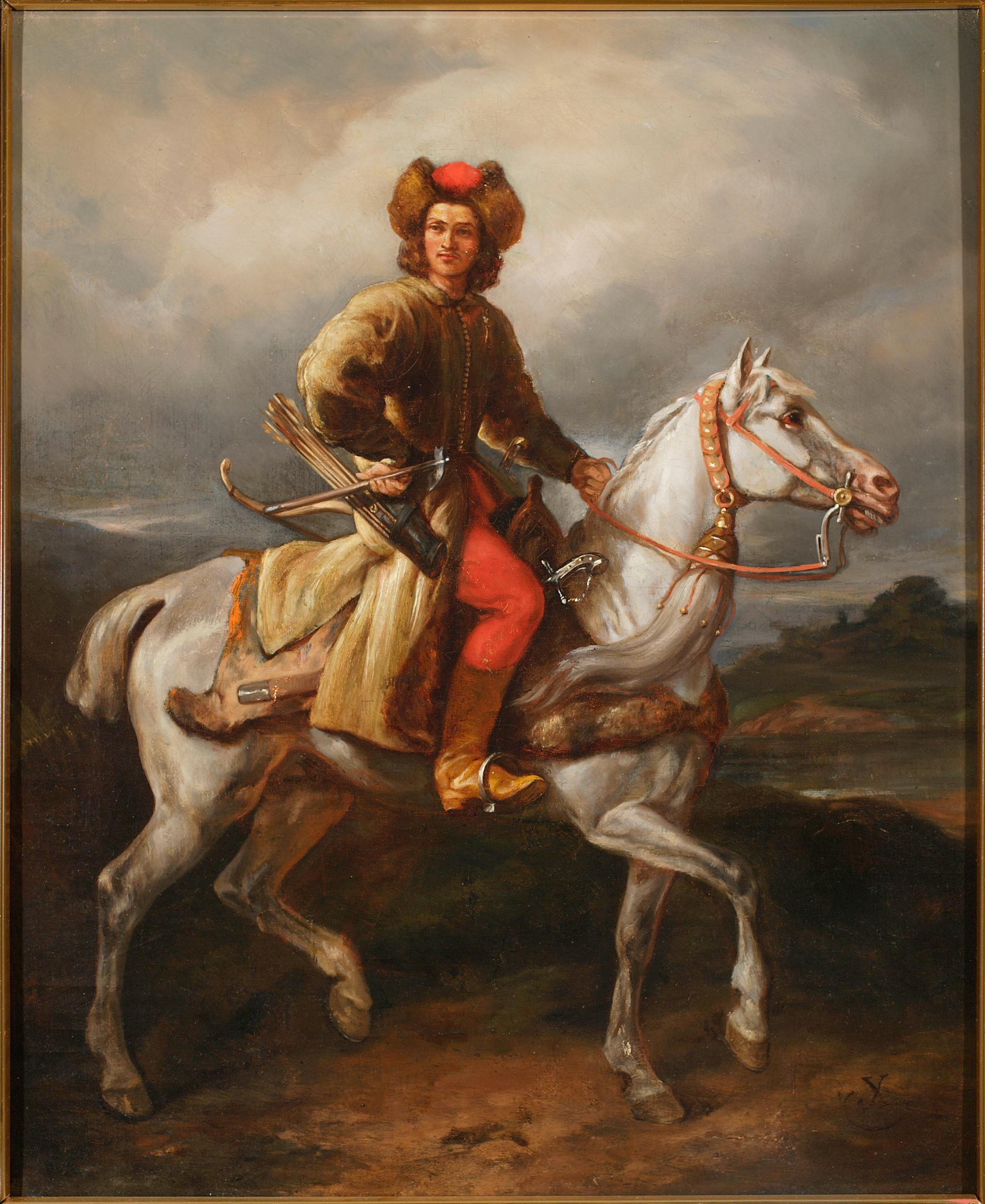
Lisowczyk light-cavalryman

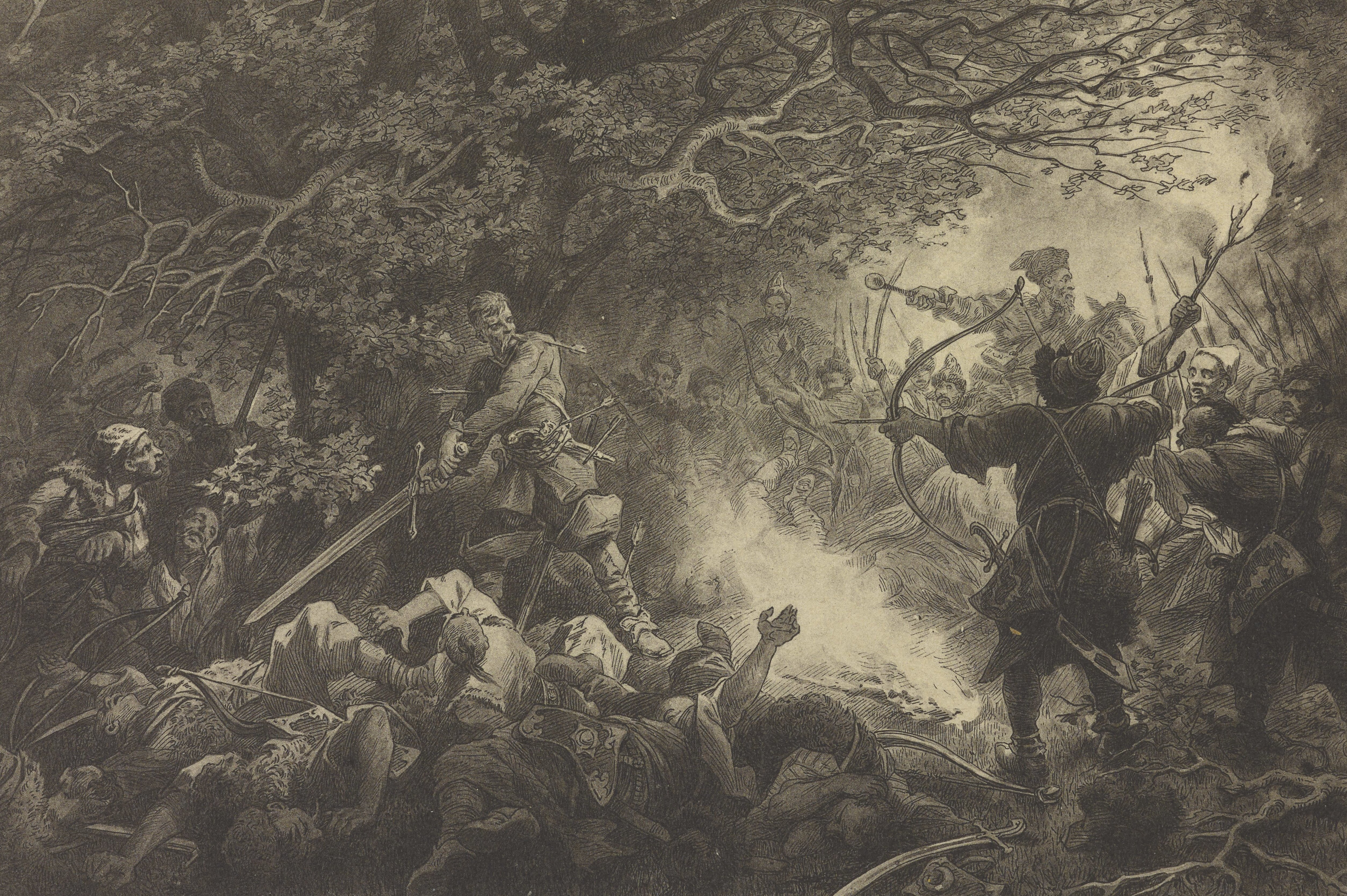
Longinus Podbipięta

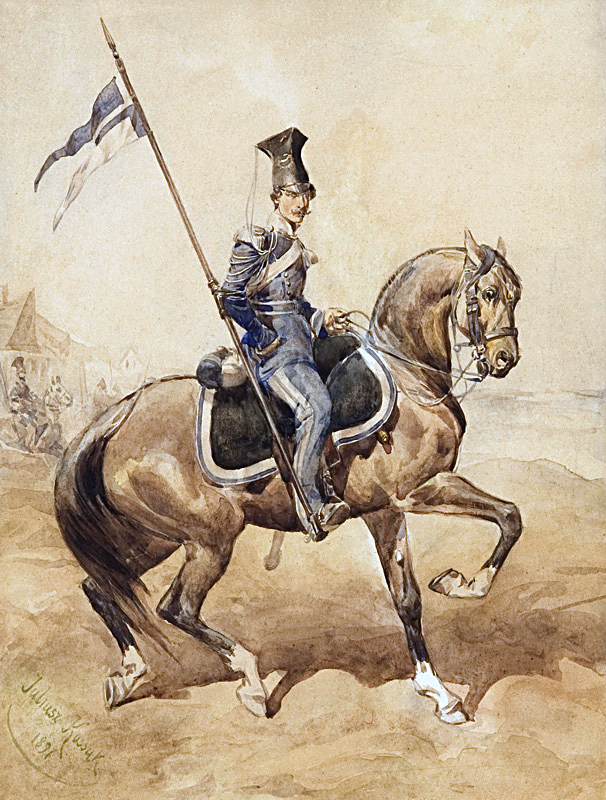
Uhlan of the Polish National Guard in Lwów in 1848

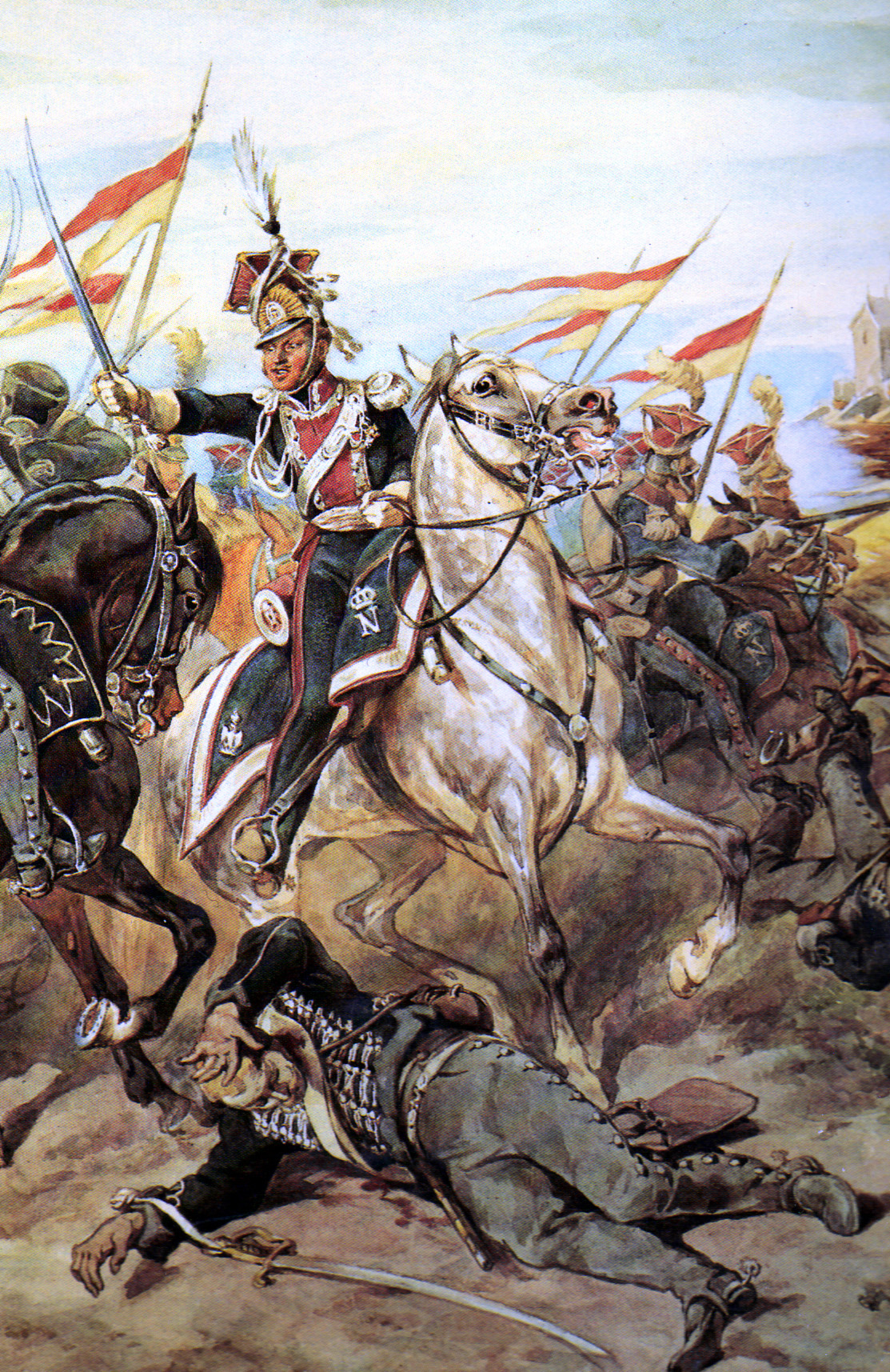
Polish Legions (Napoleonic-period) light horse

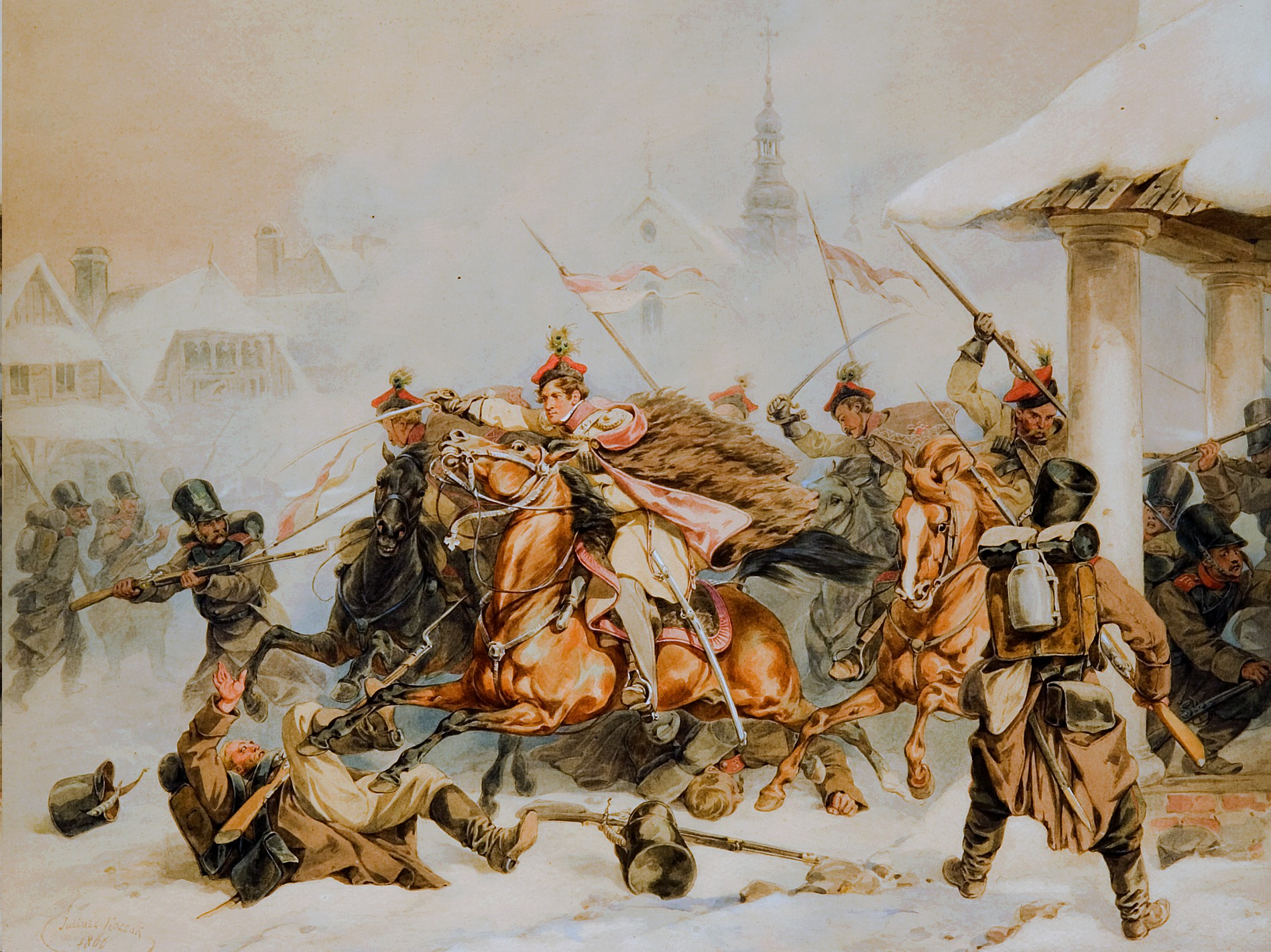
1846 Kraków Uprising

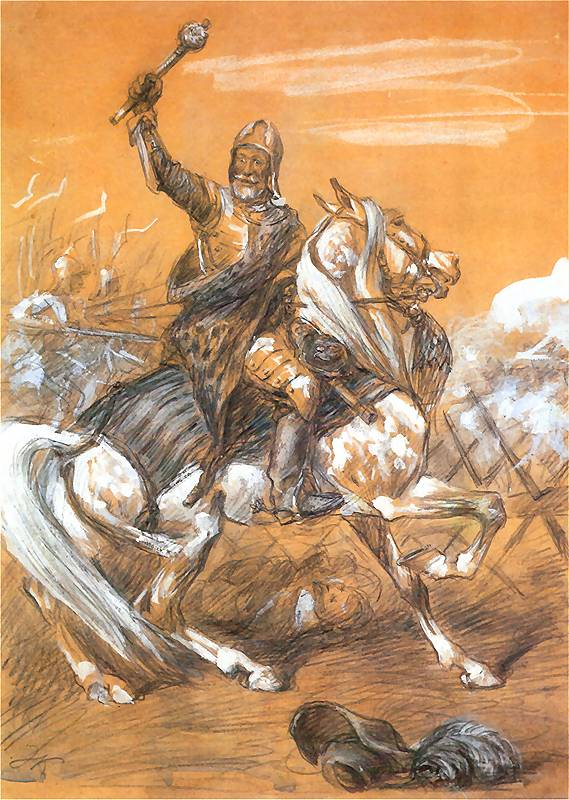
Hetman Jan Karol Chodkiewicz

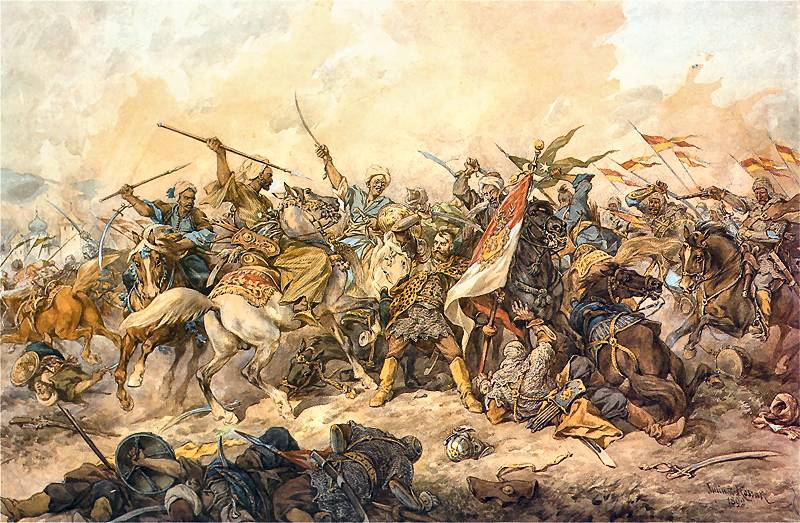
Krzysztof Gniewosz defending the Polish banner at Chocim

== Bibliography ==
- Maciej Masłowski: Juliusz Kossak, Warsaw 1984, ed. „Auriga” - Wydawnictwa Artystyczne i Filmowe (Art and Film Publishers, 2nd ed. - 1986, 3rd ed. - 1990) ISBN 83-221-0294-1.

== See also ==
- Wojciech Kossak (1857–1942), painter, son of a famous Polish painter, Juliusz Kossak
- Jerzy Kossak (1886–1955), painter, Juliusz Kossak's grandson, Wojciech Kossak's son, father of painter and poet Gloria Kossak (1941–1991)
- Zofia Kossak-Szczucka (1889–1968), novelist, Juliusz Kossak's granddaughter and daughter of Wojciech Kossak's twin brother Tadeusz Kossak
- Maria Pawlikowska-Jasnorzewska (1891–1945), poet, Juliusz Kossak's granddaughter, daughter of Wojciech Kossak
- Magdalena Samozwaniec (1894–1972), writer, Juliusz Kossak's granddaughter and daughter of Wojciech Kossak
- Gloria Kossak (1941–1991), painter and poet, Juliusz Kossak's great-granddaughter, daughter of Jerzy Kossak
- Simona Kossak (1943-2007), biologist, Juliusz Kossak's great-granddaughter, daughter of Jerzy Kossak
- "Kossak family", including second-, third- and fourth-generation painters
- List of Poles
