= Simona Kossak =

Polish biologist (1943-2007)

Simona Gabriela Kossak
- Born: 30 May 1943; Kraków, General Government
- Died: 15 March 2007 (aged 63); Białystok, Poland
- Occupation: Biologist
- Known for: Ecological preservation, behavioral ecology
- Awards: Golden Cross of Merit

Simona Gabriela Kossak (30 May 1943 – 15 March 2007) was a Polish biologist, ecologist, and professor of forest sciences. Kossak is known for her efforts to preserve the remnants of natural ecosystems in Poland. Her work dealt with, among other things, the behavioral ecology of mammals. She sometimes referred to herself as a "zoo-psychologist."

== Early life ==
Kossak was born in Kraków, during the Second World War, when the city was occupied by German forces.

== Career ==
She achieved a BSc and MSc in Biology in 1976. In 1980, the Scientific Council of the Forest Research Institute awarded Kossak with a doctoral degree in Forest Sciences on the basis of her doctoral dissertation Research on the trophic situation of roe deer in the habitat of fresh mixed coniferous forest in the Białowieża Primeval Forest and, in 1991, with a postdoctoral degree in Forest Sciences on the basis of her postdoctoral dissertation Environmental and intraspecific determinants of the feeding behavior of roe deer (Capreolus capreolus L.) in the forest environment. In 1997, she received the academic title of Professor of Forest Sciences.

Kossak worked at the Mammal Research Institute of the Polish Academy of Sciences in Białowieża and at the Forest Research Institute at the Department of Natural Forests, where she was the director from January 2003 until her death in 2007. She was also one of the originators of the UOZ-1 repeller, a device that warns wild animals of passing trains. In October 2000, Kossak was awarded the Golden Cross of Merit.

Kossak was known for her uncompromising views about and actions for the protection of nature, especially in the Białowieża Forest, where she lived in the old forester's lodge "Dziedzinka" for over 30 years.

== Personal life ==
Kossak came from a well-known artistic family. She was the daughter of Jerzy Kossak, sister of Gloria Kossak, granddaughter of Wojciech Kossak, and great-granddaughter of Juliusz Kossak, and niece of Magdalena Samozwaniec and Maria Pawlikowska-Jasnorzewska. Lech Wilczek, a naturalist, photographer, and writer, was Kossak's lifelong partner.

== Legacy ==
In 2024, Kossak's life was the subject of a biographical drama film directed and written by Adrian Panek. The film stars Sandra Drzymalska as the main protagonist and premiered at the 24th New Horizons International Film Festival in July 2024.

== Publications ==
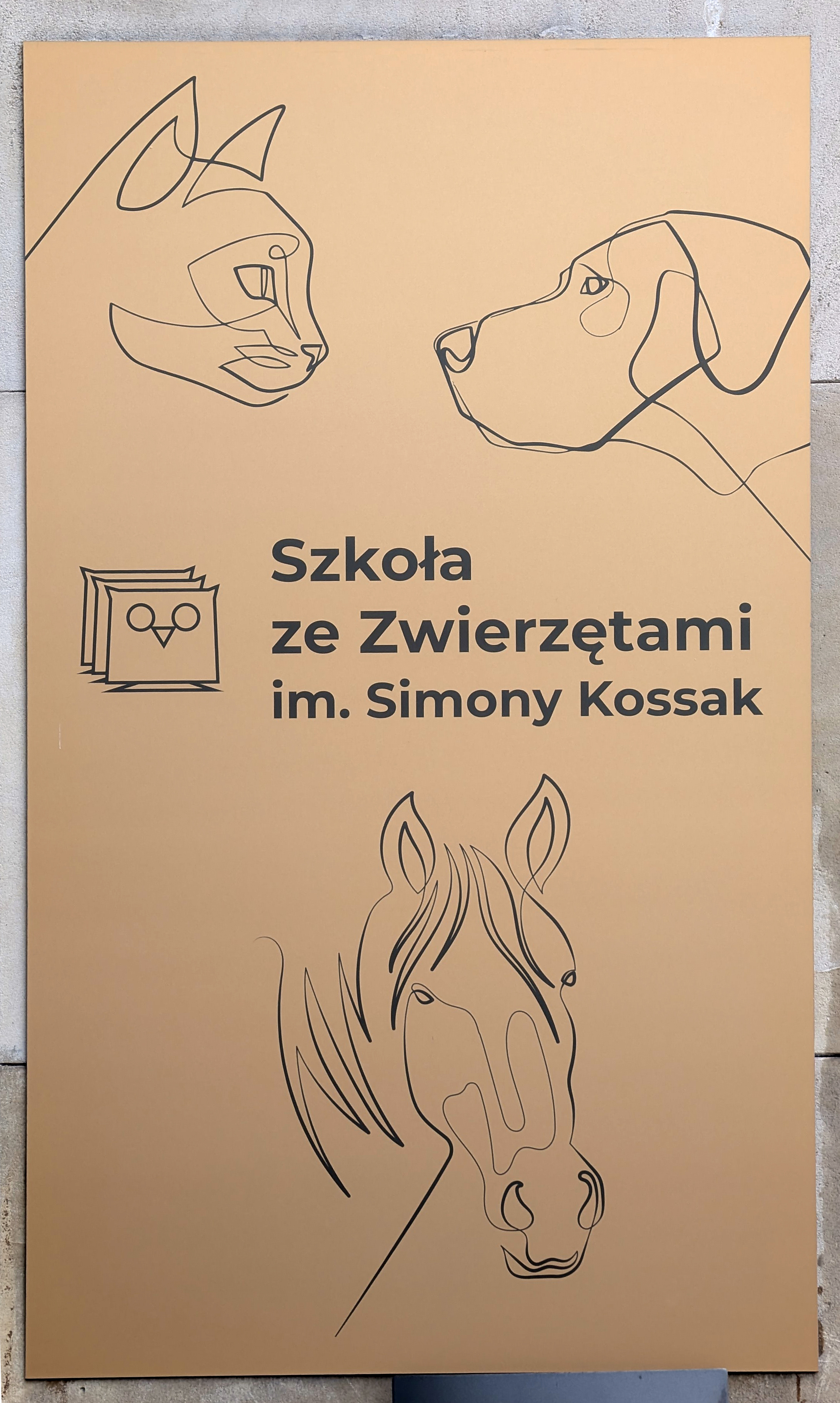
Sign in front of the Simona Kosak Private Veterinary School No. 1 in Warsaw on Kiewska Street

=== Books ===
- The Białowieza Forest Saga
- The National Park in the Białowieza Forest

=== Articles ===
- Borowski, S., & Kossak, S. (1972). Bisoniana LI. The natural food preferences of the European bison in seasons free of snow cover. Acta theriologica, 17(13), 151-169.
- Borowski, S., & Kossak, S. (1975). The food habits of deer in the Białowieża Primeval Forest. Acta Theriologica, 20(32), 463-506.
- Kossak, S. (1976). The complex character of the food preferences of Cervidae and phytocenosis structure. Acta theriologica, 21(27), 359-373.
- Kossak, S. (1983). Trophic relations of roe deer in a fresh deciduous forest. Acta theriologica, 28(6), 83-127.
- Kossak, S. (1989). Multiple hunting by lynx and red fox and utilization of prey by some carnivores. Acta Theriologica, 34(36), 505-512.
- Kossak, S. (1992). Foraging habits and behaviour of moose calves in virgin forest. Acta Theriologica, 37, 51-51.

== See also ==
- Simona Kossak (2024) — biographical film about Kossak
