= Tadeusz Kossak =

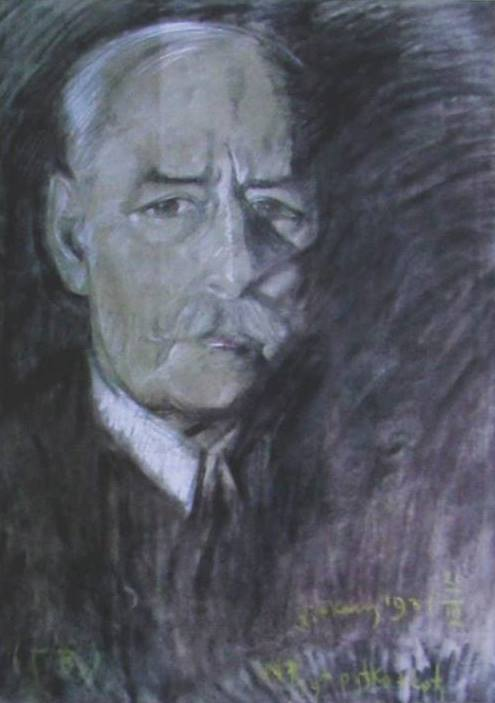
1931 portrait by Stanisław Ignacy Witkiewicz

Tadeusz Kossak (1 January 1857 – 3 July 1935) was a Polish Army officer and freedom fighter. He owned a country estate in Górki Wielkie that became a hub for Polish intellectuals of the era. He was the father of writer, activist, and World War II resistance fighter Zofia Kossak-Szczucka.

== Biography ==
Kossak was born in Paris, France, into a noted family of artists and writers. He was the son of the painter Juliusz Kossak, and twin brother to Wojciech Kossak, also a painter. After the family's return to Congress Poland from his birthplace of France, Kossak attended school first in Warsaw and later in Kraków. He came to prominence in 1906 when he was arrested for political activism against Imperial Russian authorities and the foreign occupation of Poland. During World War I, in 1917, he joined the Polish Corps of Józef Dowbor-Muśnicki fighting for Polish independence.

In 1922 with his wife Anna (née Kisielnicka), he moved from Kresy Wschodnie in Eastern Poland to Górki Wielkie near Cieszyn in Silesia. There they leased from the state a country estate where they hosted many intellectuals of the period, including Jan Parandowski, Maria Dąbrowska, Jan Sztaudynger, Melchior Wańkowicz, Wojciech Kossak, Maria Pawlikowska-Jasnorzewska, Magdalena Samozwaniec, Jadwiga Witkiewicz, and her husband, Stanisław Ignacy Witkiewicz.

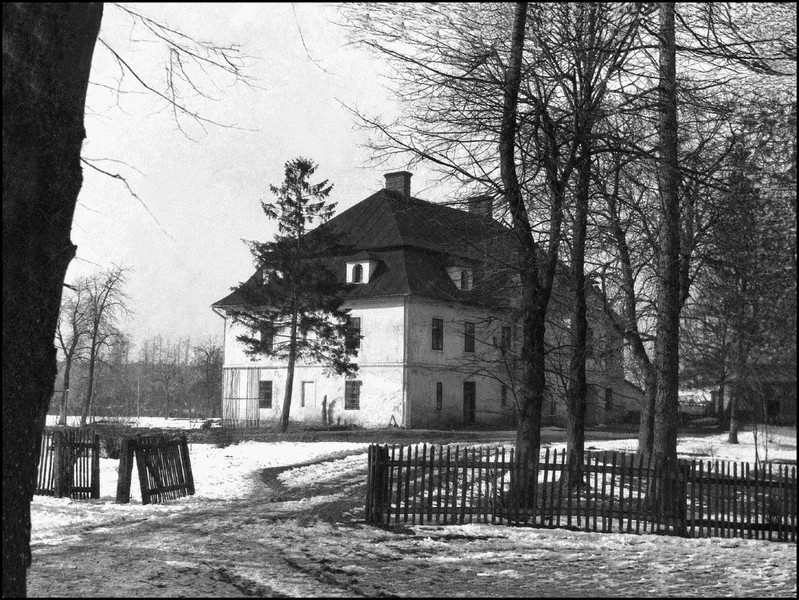
Kossak Manor in Górki, burned to the ground in 1945

In 1925 Kossak published his war memoires, Wspomnienia wojenne (1918-1920) about the war against The Bolsheviks. He was also the author of a book titled "Jak to było w armii austriackiej" - 'How it was in the Austrian Army' - published in 1927. He died in July 1935 and is buried in Górki Wielkie.

== Family ==
He was married to Anna and they had one daughter and four sons.
