= Baba-dziwo =

Baba-dziwo is a theatrical play, a tragic comedy, in 3 acts, by Polish writer Maria Pawlikowska-Jasnorzewska. It premiered in Kraków at the Juliusz Słowacki Theatre in 1938. The word 'baba' is a crude word for a woman in Polish, and 'dziwo' means 'wonder'. The title has been translated by Elwira M. Grossman and Paul J. Kelly as A Woman of Wonder.

== Plot ==
The play describes an autocratic female ruler, Valida Vrana, of a totalitarian state called Ritonia. It also deals with the issue of women's reproductive rights.
