= Wojciech Kossak =

Polish painter (1856–1942)

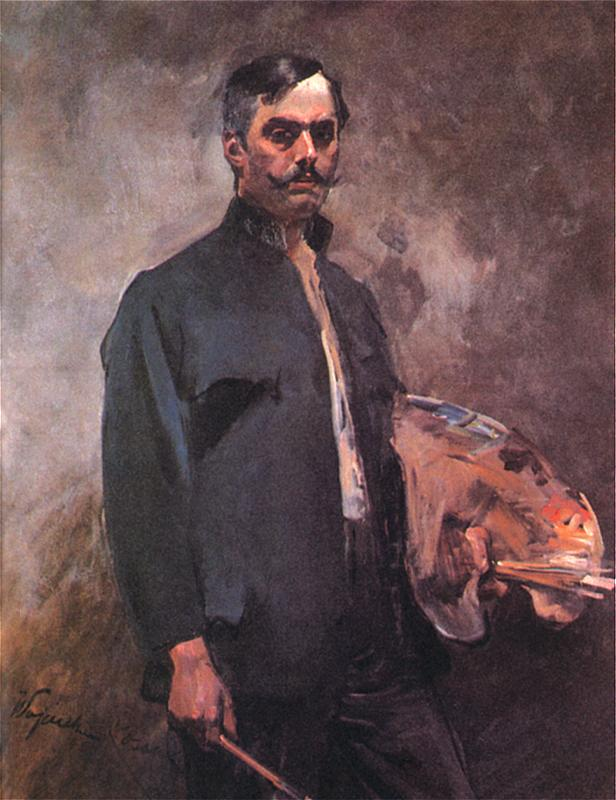
- Self-portrait (1893)
- Born: Wojciech Horacy Kossak; 31 December 1856; Paris, France
- Died: 29 July 1942 (aged 85); Kraków, Poland
- Known for: Painting
- Notable work: The Racławice Panorama; Panorama Berezyna; Olszynka Grochowska; Wyjazd na polowanie w Gödöllö; Krwawa niedziela w Petersburgu 22 stycznia 1905 r.

Wojciech Horacy Kossak (31 December 1856 – 29 July 1942) was a Polish painter. A member of the Kossak family of artists and writers, he was the son of painter Juliusz Kossak, and twin brother of freedom fighter Tadeusz Kossak. He was the father of writers Maria Pawlikowska-Jasnorzewska and Magdalena Samozwaniec, and painter Jerzy Kossak.

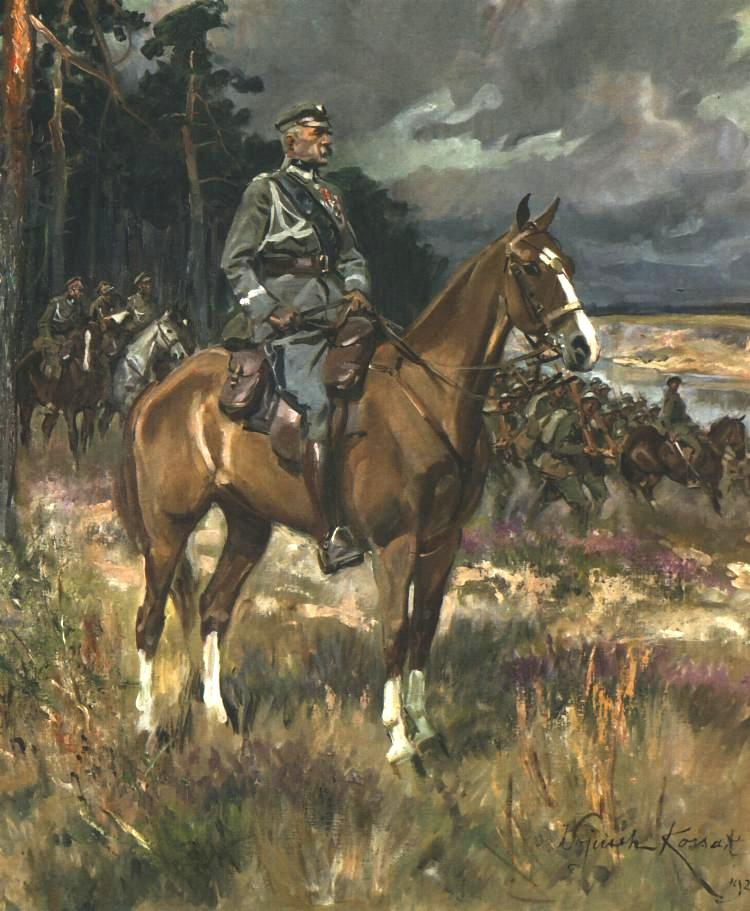
Kossak's Piłsudski on Horseback, 1928, National Museum, Warsaw—one of the most popular artistic portrayals of Piłsudski

== Life ==
Wojciech Horacy Kossak was born in Paris on New Year's Eve of 1856 just before midnight, while his twin brother Tadeusz Kossak was born just after on 1 January 1857. The family eventually left France. His middle name was in honour of his godfather, French painter Horace Vernet. Kossak began his education upon his family's return to Poland. He attended the Three Crosses Square Gymnasium in Warsaw and later the Gimnazjum św. Anny in Kraków. He simultaneously studied painting with his father Juliusz.

Between 1871 and 1873, Wojciech studied at the Kraków School of Drawing and Painting (later School of Fine Arts) - under Władysław Łuszczkiewicz, followed by a stint until 1875 at the Munich Academy of Fine Arts, with professors Alexander Strähuber and Alexander Wagner.

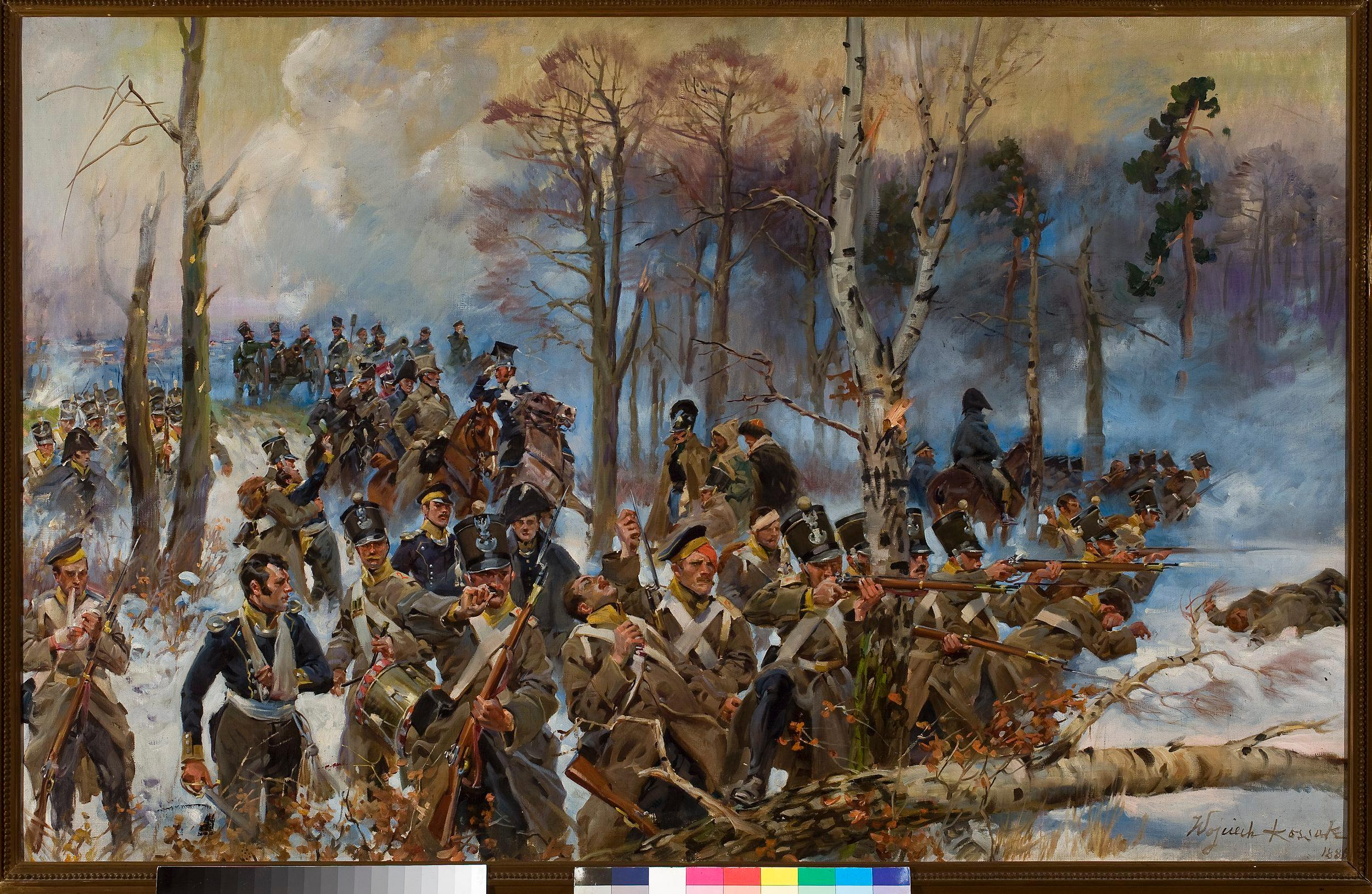
Kossak's Olszynka Grochowska, ca 1931 National Museum, Warsaw

=== Last years ===
Kossak was a very hard-working and prolific painter. It is impossible to mention all of his paintings, and he painted until the end of his life and made plans for new ventures until the last moments. Paintings from this period include: Poland's Marriage to the Sea, Portrait of Edward Krasiński, Fantasy on the Theme of Polish Cavalry, Guarding the Polish Sea, Portrait of Cardinal Hlond, Portrait of General Kazimierz Sosnkowski. His work was also part of the painting event in the art competition at the 1928 Summer Olympics.

Kossak spent the summer of 1939 in Jurata, from where he returned to Kraków at the end of August, where he witnessed the German invasion. The September defeat was a shock for Kossak, but he still believed in the Polish soldier. He wrote to a friend: "With the moment of our defeats and the disgrace of this poor Rydz, who was so immature in his role, I lost my heart not knowing that what was my beloved subject, not only has not ceased to be the most popular, but today the most expensive sursum corda has happened".

He did not stop painting during the occupation. Portraits and genre scenes were created, such as weddings or hunting, but also sketches for the panorama of Grochów. He refused to work for the Germans. He refused, among others, to paint a portrait of Hans Frank, claiming old age, despite the fact that his studio, where he talked to the German officer, was full of paintings, both works in progress and completed.

Among his final works are the Portrait of Zofia Jachimecka, Equestrian Portrait of Tadeusz Chutkowski, Stefan Skrzyński, Tatar Bondage, Kirasjer and a Girl and Farys. On the day of his death – July 29, 1942 – he asked that paint be put on the palette, but he could not get up. He did not realize that death was coming. In the evening, remaining conscious until the last moment, he died surrounded by family.

== Work ==
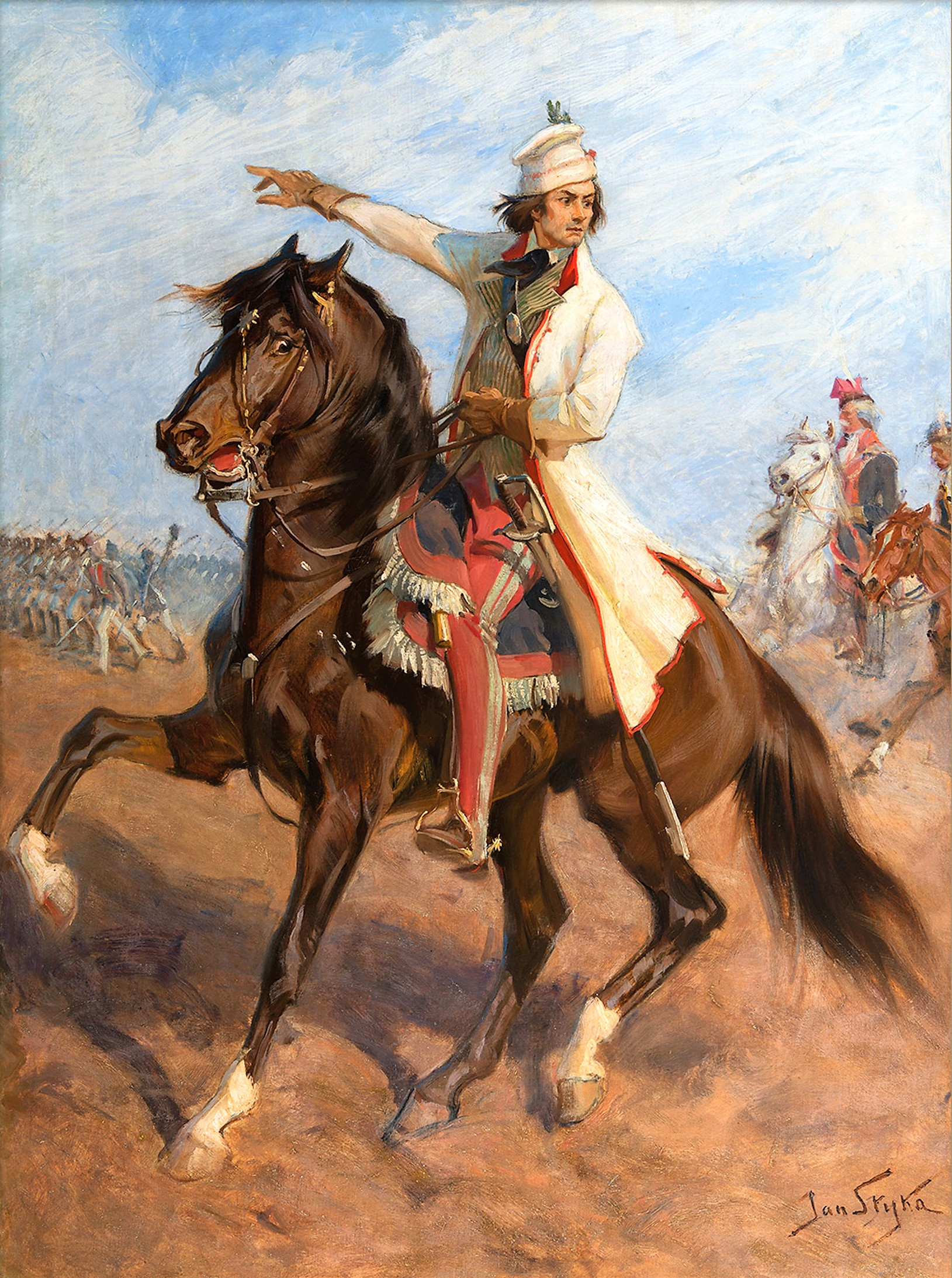
A sketch of Tadeusz Kościuszko by Kossak for the Racławice Panorama

Wojciech Kossak's historical painting was different in style from that of his predecessor Jan Matejko. He belonged to a new generation of Polish battle-scene artists influenced by the work of his father Juliusz. However, like Matejko, he is known for depicting the history of Polish armed struggle and notable Polish battles of Central and Eastern Europe against foreign oppressors. Among his most famous paintings is The Racławice Panorama.

== Recognition ==
In 2018, at a ceremony held at the Royal Castle in Warsaw on the 100th anniversary of Poland regaining its independence, Polish President Andrzej Duda posthumously conferred the country's highest distinction, the Order of the White Eagle, upon 25 distinguished Poles including Kossak.

== See also ==
- Juliusz Kossak (1824–1899), painter, Wojciech's father,
- Jerzy Kossak (1886–1955), painter, Wojciech's son,
- Simona Kossak (1943–2007), biologist, Wojciech's granddaughter,
- Zofia Kossak-Szczucka (1889–1968), novelist, daughter of Wojciech's twin brother, Tadeusz Kossak
- Maria Pawlikowska-Jasnorzewska (1891–1945), poet, Wojciech's daughter
- Magdalena Samozwaniec (1894–1972), writer, Wojciech's daughter
- List of Poles

== Notes and references ==
- Łozińska Hempel, Maria (1986). Z łańcucha wspomnień. Wydawnictwo Literackie.
- Wojciech Kossak's gallery at malarze.com
