= Magdalena Samozwaniec =

Polish writer (1894–1972)

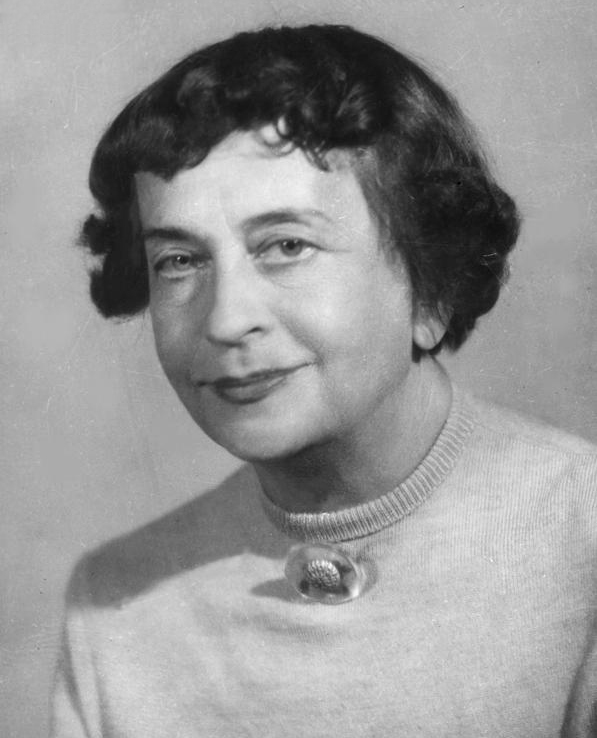
Magdalena Samozwaniec

Magdalena Samozwaniec née Kossak (26 July 1894, Kraków – 20 October 1972, Warsaw) was a Polish writer. The Kossak family is known for many artists including her father Wojciech Kossak, her brother Jerzy and sister Maria.

== Stories by Magdalena Samozwaniec ==
1. Na ustach grzechu: powieść z życia wyższych sfer towarzyskich, Kraków 1922
2. Czy chcesz być dowcipny? Straszliwe opowieści „na wesoło”, Warszawa 1923
3. Malowana żona, Warszawa 1924
4. Kartki z pamiętnika młodej mężatki, Warszawa 1926
5. Starość musi się wyszumieć, Warszawa 1926
6. Mężowie i mężczyźni, Warszawa 1926
7. O kobiecie, która znalazła kochanka: powieść osnuta na tle najbliższej, nieokreślonej bliżej przyszłości. Rzecz dzieje się w Krakowie, Warszawa 1930
8. Wielki szlem: powieść tylko dla brydżystów, Warszawa 1933
9. O dowcipnym mężu dobrej Ludwiki: powieść, Warszawa 1933
10. Ponura materialistka: nowele, Poznań 1934
11. Świadome ojcostwo, Warszawa 1936
12. Maleńkie karo karmiła mi żona, Warszawa 1937
13. Wróg kobiet, Warszawa 1938
14. Piękna pani i brzydki pan, Warszawa 1939
15. Królewna Śmieszka, Kraków 1942
16. Fraszki Magdaleny Samozwaniec. Wiek XX, Kraków 1944
17. Tylko dla kobiet, Katowice, 1946
18. Błękitna krew, Kraków 1954
19. Moja wojna trzydziestoletnia, Warszawa 1954
20. Maria i Magdalena, Kraków 1956
21. Tylko dla mężczyzn, Katowice 1958
22. Młodość nie radość: powieść satyryczna, Warszawa 1960
23. Czy pani mieszka sama? Katowice 1960
24. Pod siódmym niebem, Warszawa 1960
25. Tylko dla dzieci: wiersze i bajki satyryczne dla młodszych i starszych, Kraków 1960
26. Komu dziecko, komu? Powieść satyryczno-obyczajowa, Warszawa 1963
27. Tylko dla dziewcząt, Warszawa 1966
28. Szczypta soli, szczypta bliźnich, Warszawa 1968
29. Krystyna i chłopy, Warszawa 1969
30. Zalotnica niebieska, Warszawa 1973
31. Łyżka za cholewą, a widelec na stole: mała kulinarna silva rerum, Kraków 1974
32. Angielska choroba, Warszawa 1983
33. Baśnie, Warszawa 1987
34. Z pamiętnika niemłodej już mężatki, Warszawa 2009
