= Maria Pawlikowska-Jasnorzewska =

Polish poet (1891–1945)

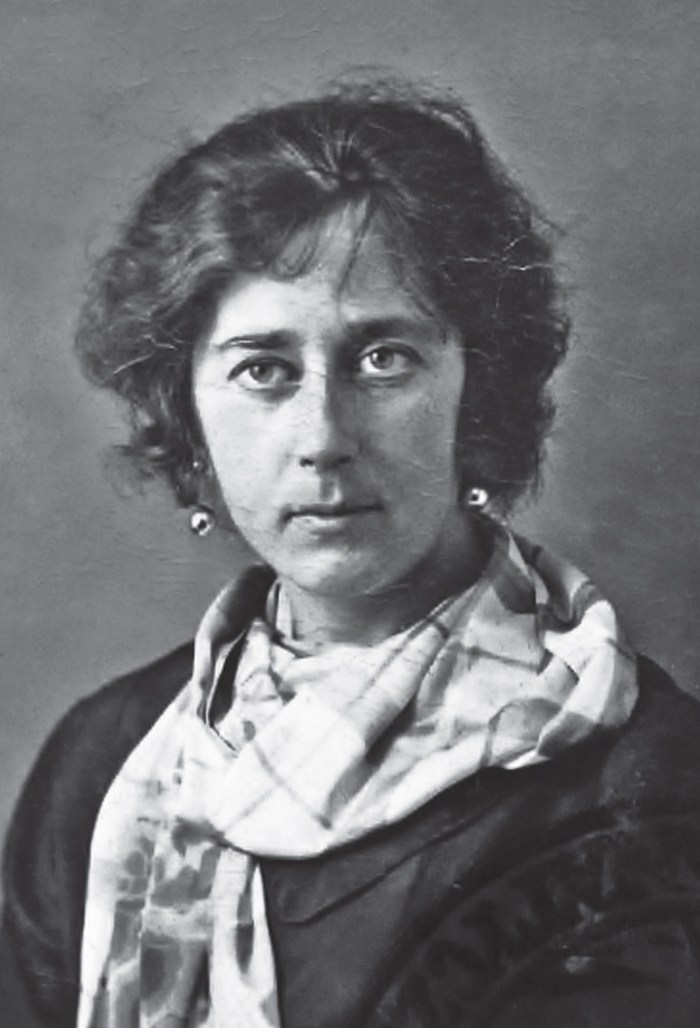
- Pawlikowska-Jasnorzewska, c. 1940
- Born: 24 November 1891; Kraków
- Died: 9 July 1945 (aged 53); Manchester, England
- Occupations: Poet, dramatist
- Spouse(s): Władysław Bzowski (1915-1919); Jan Gwalbert Pawlikowski (1919-1929); Stefan Jasnorzewski (1931)
- Writing career
- Language: Polish
- Period: Poland's interwar period
- Notable works: Baba-dziwo; Gołąb ofiarny
- Website: maria-pawlikowska-jasnorzewska.com

Maria Pawlikowska-Jasnorzewska (née Kossak; 24 November 1891 – 9 July 1945) was a Polish poet and dramatist. She was dubbed the "Polish Sappho" and "queen of lyrical poetry" during Poland's interwar period.

== Life ==
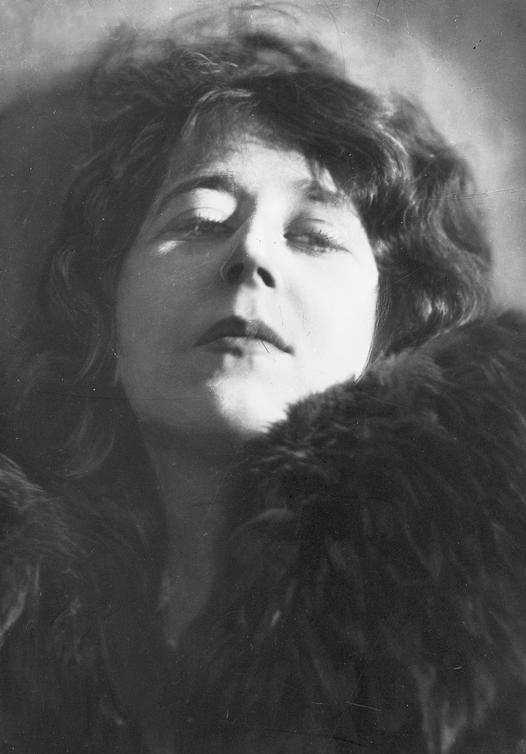
Pawlikowska-Jasnorzewska, 1920s

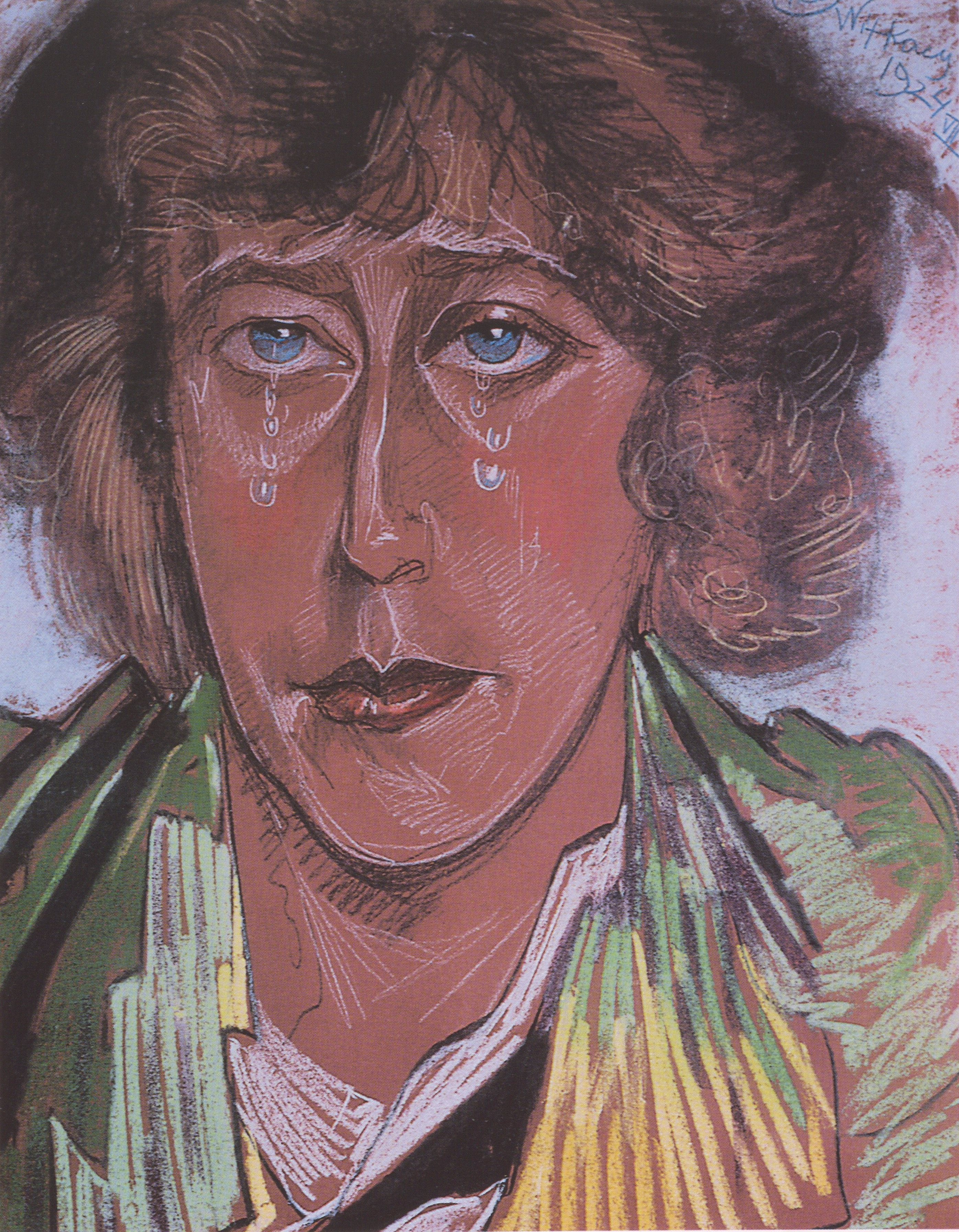
Pawlikowska-Jasnorzewska, pastel by Witkacy, 1924

Born in Kraków into a family of painters, Maria Kossak grew up in the manor house known as the Kossakówka surrounded by artists, writers, and intellectuals. Her grandfather, Juliusz Kossak, and father, Wojciech Kossak, were both professional painters famous for their depictions of historical scenes and horses. Her younger sister, Magdalena Samozwaniec, was also a popular writer of satire.

Fluent in French, English, and German, in her youth, Kossak divided her time between painting and poetry. It was only during her marriage to Jan Pawlikowski—after the annulment of her first marriage to Władysław Bzowski—that her literary interests prevailed, inspired by the couple's discussions about her poetic output and the world of literature in general. Their passionate relationship based on shared interests and mutual love was an endless source of poetic inspiration for her. However, her second marriage also failed.

Following her divorce, Maria Pawlikowska became associated with the Warsaw-based Skamander group of poets: Julian Tuwim, Jan Lechoń, Kazimierz Wierzyński, and other renowned writers such as Jarosław Iwaszkiewicz, Irena Krzywicka, Kazimiera Iłłakowiczówna and Tadeusz Boy-Żeleński. In the inter-war period Pawlikowska-Jasnorzewska published twelve volumes of poetry and established herself as one of the most innovative poets of the era.

She began her career as a playwright in 1924, with her first farce, Archibald the Chauffeur, produced in Warsaw. By 1939 she had written fifteen plays whose treatment of taboo topics such as abortion, extramarital affairs, and incest provoked scandals. She was compared by critics to Molière, Marivaux, Oscar Wilde, George Bernard Shaw, and Witkacy. Her plays depicted her unconventional approach to motherhood, which she understood as a painful obligation that ends mutual passion. She spoke in support of a woman's right to choose.

In 1939, at the onset of World War II, she followed her third husband, Stefan Jasnorzewski, to England. She was diagnosed with bone cancer in 1944, soon becoming hemiplegic, and on 9 July 1945 died in Manchester, cared for to the last by her husband. She is buried with her husband in Southern Cemetery, Manchester.

== A Woman of Wonder ==
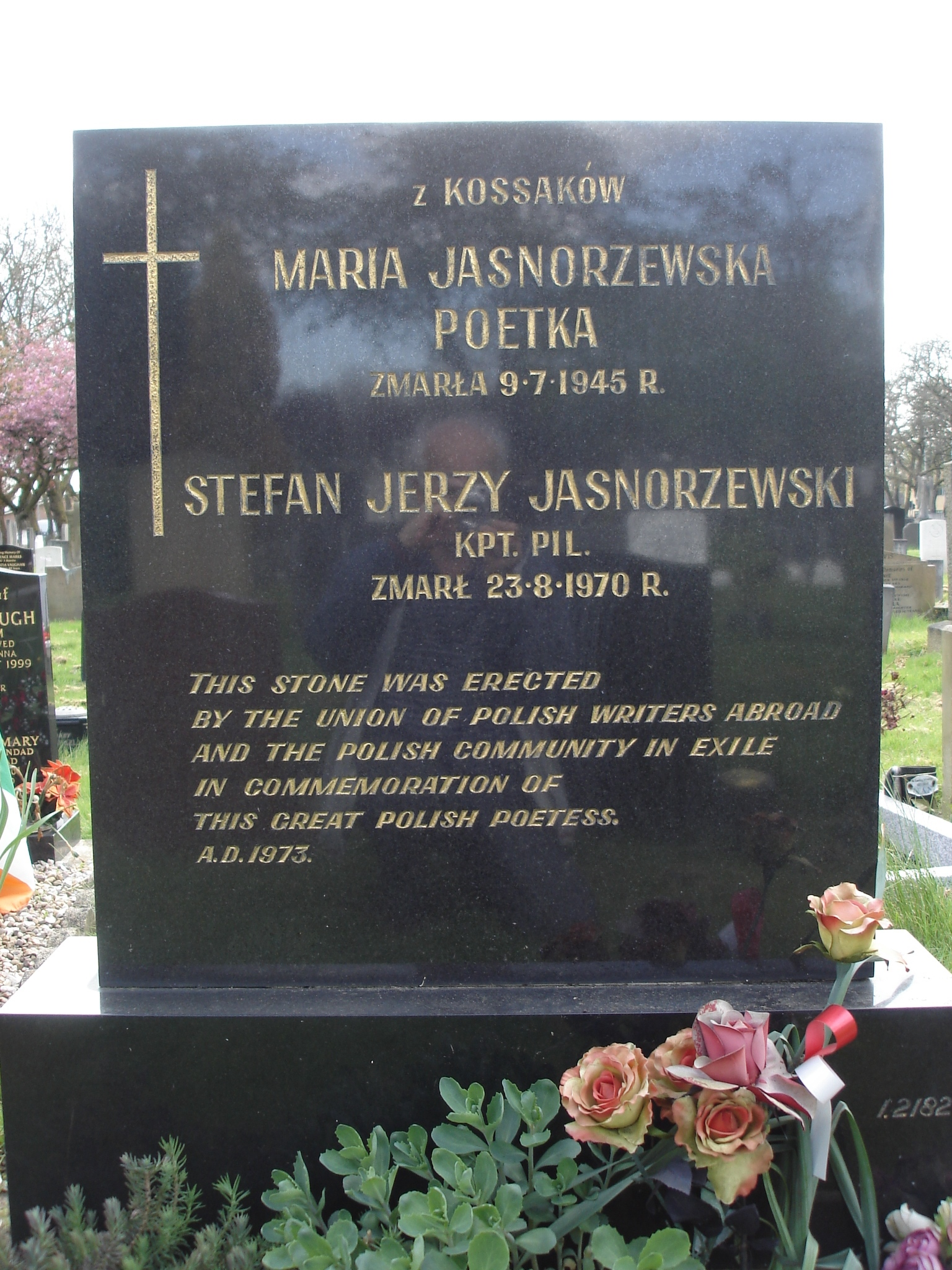
Grave, Southern Cemetery, Manchester

In 1937 Pawlikowska-Jasnorzewska wrote an anti-Nazi play, Baba-dziwo, which was translated into English by Elwira M. Grossman and Paul J. Kelly as A Woman of Wonder.

A Woman of Wonder depicts the ruthless dictatorship of [Her Highness] Valida Vrana in a country called Ritonia. Under Valida, people are ranked according to the number of children they have, with boys being the preferred sex. In Ritonia motherhood is not only a compulsory duty but also a tribute to "Her Motherly Highness." Thus the lives of women are reduced to a basic procreative function. The plot centres on the way a childless couple, Petronika and Norman, cope with this regime. Petronika is a chemist and Norman is a former governmental minister who lost his job because of his wife's insubordination. Unlike Petronika, Norman maintains the illusion of being Valida's faithful follower, even though he despises her. This difference in attitude creates tension in the marriage and even though Petronika asks for a divorce, the couple eventually remains together. While Norman waits passively for better times, Petronika prepares a secret weapon in her laboratory. Knowing Valida's weakness for perfume, she creates an intoxicating substance that eventually renders the vicious ruler powerless.

== Works ==
- Niebieskie migdały, Kraków 1922
- Różowa magia, Kraków 1924
- Narcyz 1926
- Szofer Archibald. Comedy in 3 acts, premiere: Warsaw, The New Theatre 1924, publication: "Świat" 1924 (# 45–52)
- Kochanek Sybilli Thompson. Futuristic fantasy in 3 acts, premiere: Kraków, J. Słowacki Theatre 1926
- Pocałunki, Warsaw 1926
- Dancing. Karnet balowy, Warsaw 1927
- Wachlarz, Warsaw 1927
- Cisza leśna, Warsaw 1928
- Paryż, Warsaw 1929
- Profil białej damy, Warsaw 1930
- Egipska pszenica. Play in 3 acts, premiere: Kraków, J. Słowacki Theatre 1932
- Mrówki (myrmeis). Play in 3 acts, premiere: Kraków, J. Słowacki Theatre 1936
- Referat. Farce in 3 acts, premiere: Polish TV 1968, publication: "Dialog" 1979
- Zalotnicy niebiescy. Play in 3 acts, premiere: Warsaw, The New Theatre 1933, publication Kraków 1936
- Surowy jedwab, Warsaw 1932
- Powrót mamy. Comedy in 3 acts, premiere: Warsaw, The New Theatre 1935
- Śpiąca załoga, Warsaw 1933
- Dowód osobisty. Comedy in 3 acts, premiere: Warsaw, The New Theatre 1936
- Nagroda literacka. Comedy in 4 acts, premiere: Warsaw, The New Theatre 1937
- Balet powojów, Warsaw 1935
- Biedna młodość, radio play, Polish radio 1936
- Pani zabija pana, radio play, Polish radio 1936
- Krystalizacje, Warsaw 1937
- Złowrogi portret, radio play, Polish radio 1937
- Baba-dziwo. TragiComedy in 3 acts, premiere: Kraków, J. Słowacki Theatre 1938, publication: "Dialog" 1966
- Dewaluacja Klary. Comedy in 3 acts, premiere: Poznań, Teatr Polski 1939
- Popielaty welon. Fantazja sceniczna w 9 obrazach, premiere: Warsaw, Teatr Narodowy 1939
- Szkicownik poetycki. Warsaw 1939
- Gołąb ofiarny, poems, Glasgow 1941
- Róża i lasy płonące. London, 1941
- Czterolistna koniczyna albo szachownica. London, 1980

== Awards ==
- Golden Laurel of the Polish Academy of Literature (1935)
- Literary prize of the city of Kraków (1937)

== See also ==
- List of Polish-language authors
- List of Polish-language poets
- Polish literature
- Culture of Kraków
- List of Poles
