= Chyże =

Chyże may refer to the following places:

- Chyże, Lublin Voivodeship (east Poland)
- Chyże, Lubusz Voivodeship (west Poland)
- Chyże, West Pomeranian Voivodeship (north-west Poland)
