= Bełżec Museum and Memorial Site =

Memorial complex and martyrology museum in Bełżec, Poland

- Muzeum – Miejsce Pamięci w Bełżcu
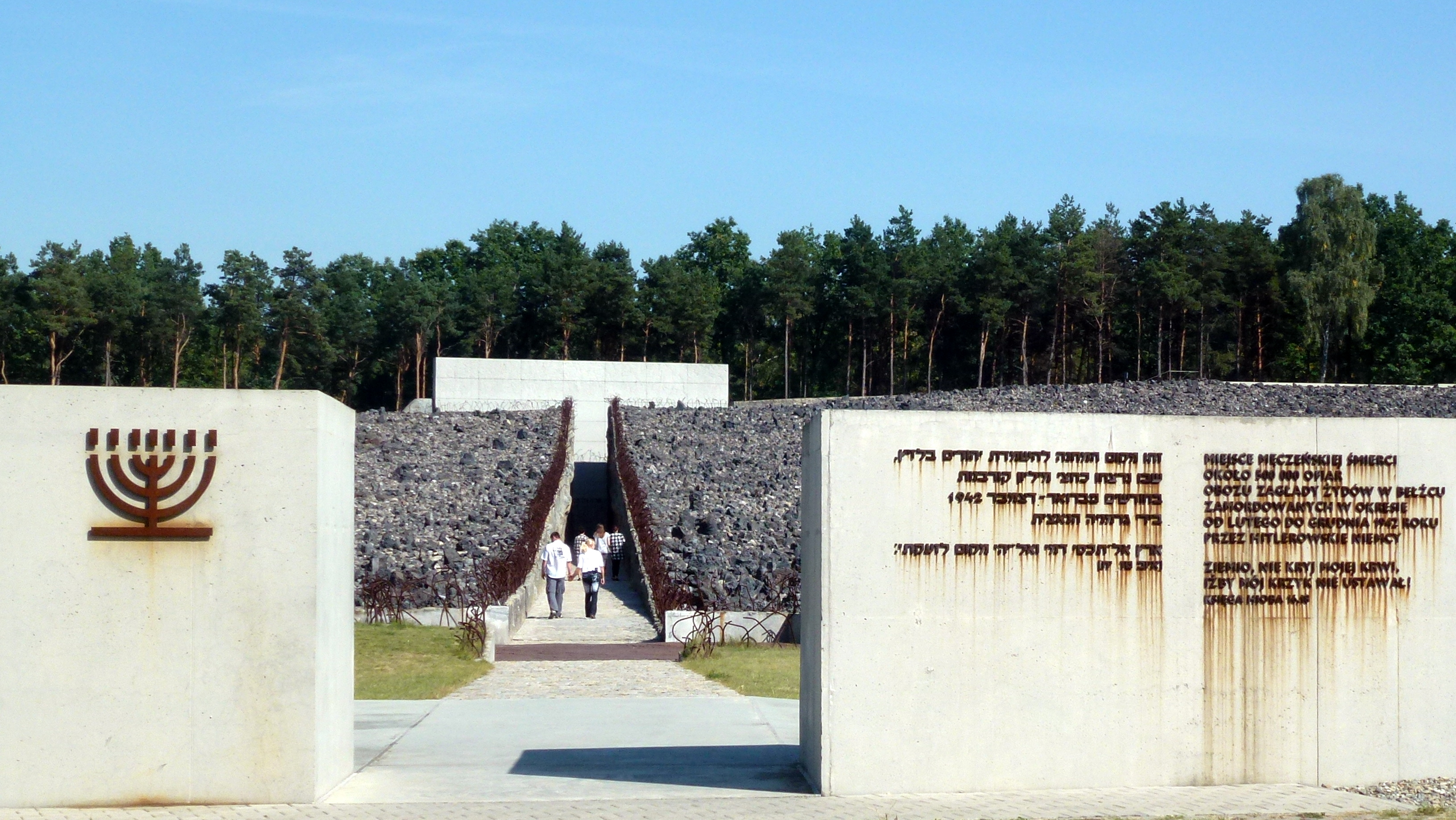
- Entrance to the museum
- Established: January 1, 2004
- Location: Bełżec; Poland
- Coordinates: 50.3735°N 23.4584°E
- Accreditation: branch of the Majdanek State Museum
- Collections: history of the Belzec extermination camp
- Director: Tomasz Hanejko
- Website: belzec.eu/pl

Monument-Cemetery in Bełżec
- Pomnik-Cmentarz w Bełżcu
- Interactive map of Monument-Cemetery in Bełżec
- Location: Bełżec; Poland
- Designer: Andrzej Sołyga, Zdzisław Pidek, Marcin Roszczyk
- Type: memorial complex
- Opening date: June 3, 2004
- Founders: Council for the Protection of Struggle and Martyrdom Sites, American Jewish Committee

Bełżec Museum and Memorial Site, also known as Museum – Memorial Site in Bełżec, is a memorial complex and martyrology museum located on the grounds of the former German Nazi Belzec extermination camp, commemorating approximately 450,000 Jews from Poland and other European countries who were killed there between 1942 and 1943.

For nearly 20 years, the former camp grounds remained unmarked and unsecured. The first monument was unveiled there only in 1963. It did not include elements indicating that the victims of the camp were of Jewish nationality and soon began to fall into disrepair. In the second half of the 1990s, based on an agreement between the Polish government and the United States Holocaust Memorial Museum in Washington, work began on a new memorial. On 1 January 2004, the Museum – Memorial Site in Bełżec was established as a branch of the Majdanek State Museum. Six months later, the new memorial complex was unveiled.

Both the monument-cemetery and the museum exhibition were positively received by experts and art critics.

== History ==
=== Extermination camp ===
The camp in Bełżec was the first of three extermination centers established by the Germans as part of Operation Reinhard. It operated from March 1942, and its sole purpose was the extermination of the Jewish population. According to Robert Kuwałek, the number of its victims is estimated at 440,000–453,000 people. The vast majority of the victims were Polish Jews, although about 25,000–30,000 Jews from Austria, Czechoslovakia, Germany, Slovakia, and Hungary were also among the murdered. For the German Nazis, the Bełżec camp was a sort of "laboratory" for genocide, and the extermination techniques developed there were later applied in other camps of Operation Reinhard.

In mid-December 1942, the extermination operation in Bełżec was interrupted. At the same time, the Germans began dismantling the camp and erasing traces of the crime. By June 1943, all buildings, fences, and guard towers were demolished. Mass graves were emptied, and the bodies extracted from them were burned on special grills. Young trees were planted on the camp grounds. After some time, a farm was also established there, inhabited by a Volksdeutsche with his family (probably one of the former guards).

=== Period of profanation and oblivion ===
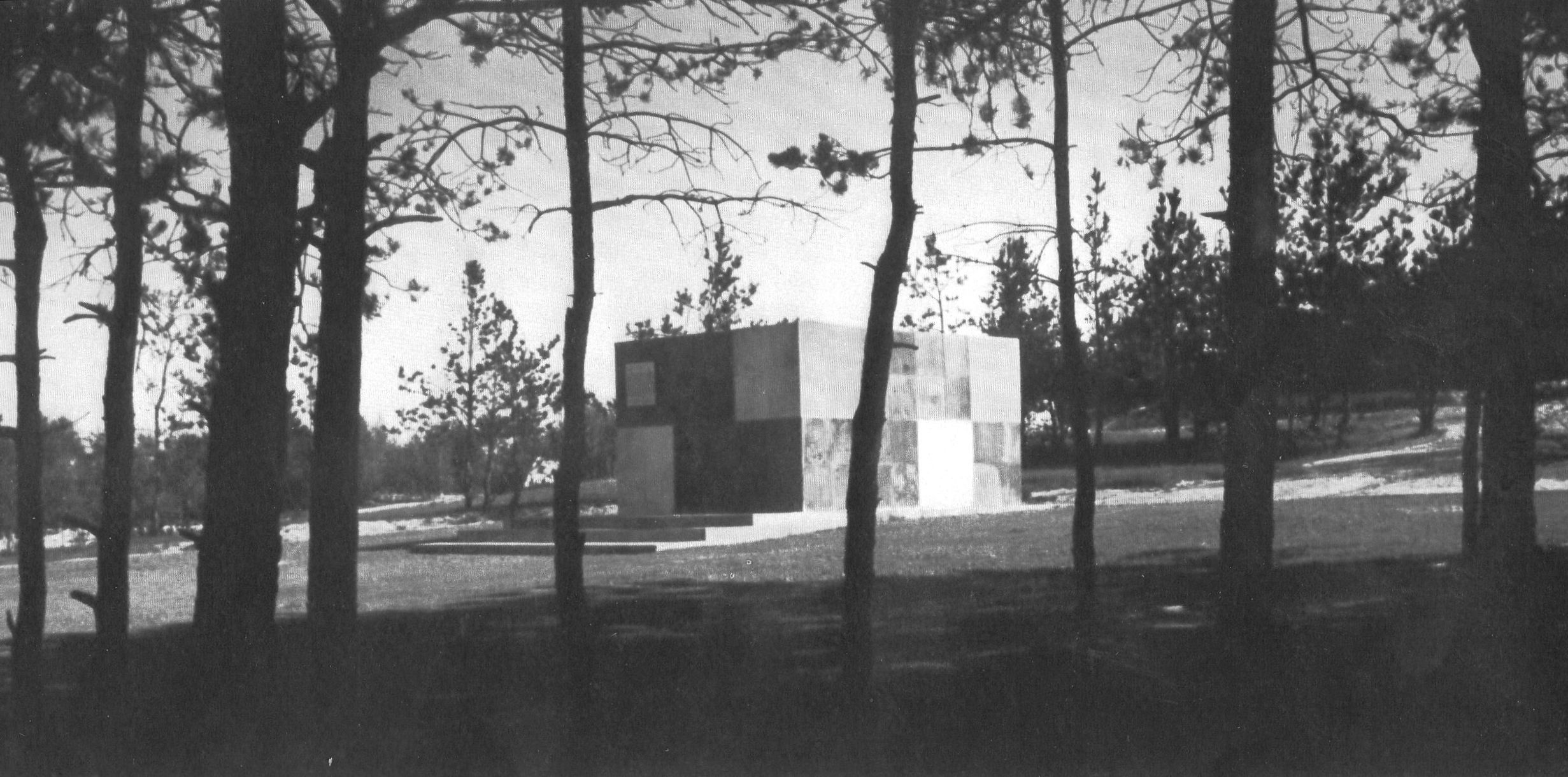
Crypt-mausoleum unveiled in December 1963

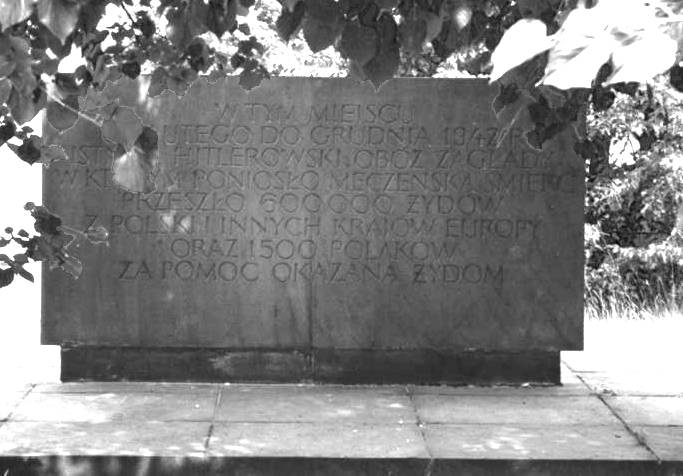
Plaque from the 1980s, part of the former commemoration

In the first post-war years, the site where hundreds of thousands of Jews were murdered remained unprotected and uncommemorated. "Graveyard hyenas" actively operated there, digging up the camp grounds in search of gold and valuables. Instances of profanation also occurred in the second half of the 1950s. A sawmill operated on the grounds of the former camp, and the railway siding used to bring in wagons with victims was utilized for economic purposes. For a long time, the authorities of the Polish People's Republic and state-sanctioned Jewish organizations did not take significant actions to prevent profanation and commemorate the victims. In 1949, a concrete tomb was built to house the remains of victims that were discovered thereafter. In 1954, a decision was made to fence off the camp grounds, but the work was not completed due to a lack of funds.

Amid the Polish October, information about the tragic condition of the camp grounds in Bełżec entered the public sphere, particularly during discussions about the state of the Majdanek State Museum. It was not until 1 December 1963 that, on the initiative of the Council for the Protection of Struggle and Martyrdom Sites, a monument commemorating the victims of the camp was unveiled there. The ceremony was modest and attracted little interest from the official press.

The fenced memorial area covered less than four hectares, encompassing only half of the camp grounds. It contained no elements indicating the Jewish origin of the victims. The central feature of the monument was a crypt-mausoleum in the form of a cube, covered with panels of artificial stone, inside which human remains and objects found at the camp were placed. On one of the walls, an inscription made of metal letters was displayed:

In memory of the victims of Hitlerite terror murdered in the years 1941–1943

After some time, a figurative sculpture by Stanisław Strzyżyński and Jarosław Olejnicki was placed in front of the crypt, depicting two emaciated prisoners, one supporting the other. The sculpture was well received by art critics. However, in the opinion of Robert Kuwałek, it somewhat obscured the historical truth about the camp, as it followed the official narrative about Nazi camps, emphasizing prisoner solidarity. Additionally, by being referred to as the "Bełżec Pietà", it introduced a "quasi-Christian element" to the site of the extermination of the Jewish population.

In the northern part of the former camp, where the bodies of victims were burned, four concrete "pylons" were erected. The mass graves that could be located were marked with rows of concrete urns with metal covers symbolizing flames. In the early 1980s, the memorial was supplemented with a plaque stating that "600,000 Jews and about 1,500 Poles (Note: In a summary dated 1947, which was part of the investigation conducted by the Chief Commission for the Prosecution of Crimes against the Polish Nation regarding the crimes committed in Bełżec, it was stated that the victims of the camp included between 1,000 and 1,500 Poles. In later Polish publications, however, the figure was consistently given as 1,500 Polish victims who were allegedly murdered in Bełżec for helping Jews. These estimates were based on the testimony of a Polish railway worker, which was most likely extracted under duress. Kuwałek (2013, pp. 279–280) links the appearance of the figure of 1,500 Polish victims in the investigation findings and in public discourse to the tendency of the authorities of the Polish People's Republic to "Polonize" sites of Jewish extermination.) for helping Jews" were murdered at the camp.

During the era of the Polish People's Republic, and especially after the events of March 1968, Bełżec became, in the words of Kuwałek, a "forgotten camp of the Holocaust". The memorial was most often visited by residents of nearby towns; visitors from other parts of Poland and foreign guests appeared only sporadically. Plans to create an information point in Bełżec in the form of a kiosk with publications were abandoned. Even in the 1980s, there were cases of the camp grounds being dug up by "treasure hunters". By the early 1990s, the memorial was already significantly neglected. The camp grounds were even used for play, social gatherings, and drinking parties. It was tidied only occasionally, usually through the efforts of pupils from the primary school in Bełżec.

=== Construction of the new memorial ===
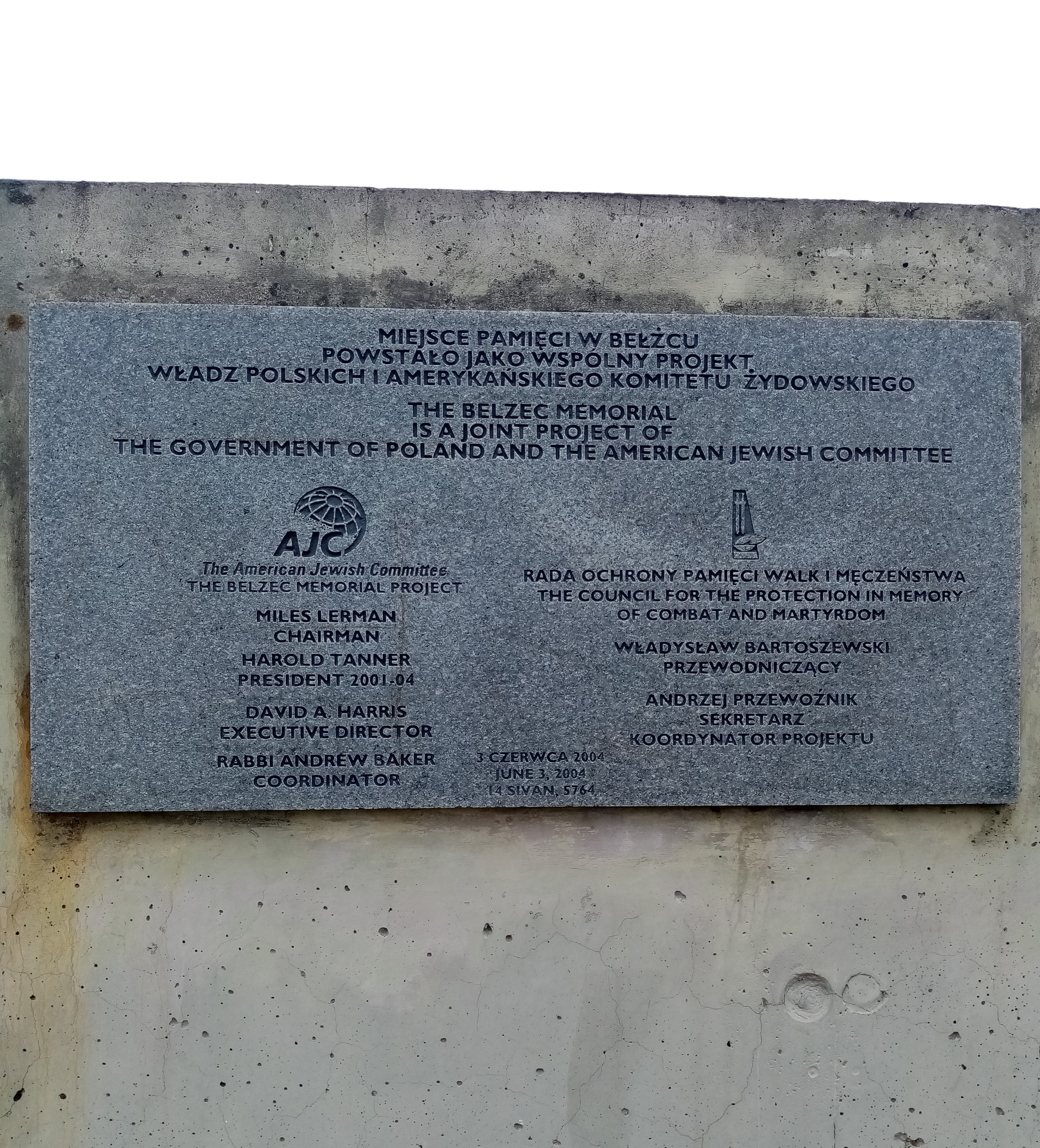
Plaque commemorating the founders of the new Museum – Memorial Site

The political breakthrough of 1989 made it possible to undertake efforts to improve the condition of the memorial site. Miles Lerman, the chairman of the museum council of the United States Holocaust Memorial Museum, whose family was murdered in Bełżec, made significant efforts in this regard. On his initiative, in 1995, the Polish government and the USHMM signed an agreement concerning the construction of a new memorial.

In 1997, an international jury chaired by Prof. Maciej Gintowt resolved a competition for the architectural and artistic design of the new memorial. Nine projects were submitted to the competition. The winning design was by Andrzej Sołyga, Zdzisław Pidek, and Marcin Roszczyk. The design for the museum building was prepared by architects Marek Dunikowski, Piotr Uherek, Jarosław Kutniowski, and Piotr Czerwiński.

Between 1997 and 2000, archaeological research was conducted on the former camp grounds, led by Prof. Andrzej Kola from the Nicolaus Copernicus University in Toruń. His team managed to find the remains of 33 mass graves, the foundations of camp buildings, as well as numerous objects or fragments of objects that belonged to the victims.

The construction of the new memorial began in 2002. Prof. Jan Grabacki was responsible for the construction, while the substantive support for the museum was provided by the Majdanek State Museum. The construction work was carried out under rabbinical supervision. The previous memorial was dismantled, with only the plaque from the old monument being preserved. About 370 trees that grew on the former camp grounds were also cut down. (Note: The idea was born to send the felled trees to the towns from which Jews were deported to Bełżec. Ultimately, it was not carried out (Małczyński (2009, p. 212)).) Only a few oaks were preserved, as dendrological studies indicated that they had grown there even before the extermination center was established.

The main investor on the Polish side was the Council for the Protection of Struggle and Martyrdom Sites, represented by Secretary General Andrzej Przewoźnik. The United States Holocaust Memorial Museum, however, withdrew from the role of official partner during the project's implementation. (Note: However, USHMM experts participated in the preparation of the permanent exhibition (Kuwałek (2005, p. 351)).) As a result, the investor representing the American Jewish diaspora became the American Jewish Committee, represented by Rabbi Andrew Baker. The AJC concluded an appropriate agreement with the USHMM on this matter. Under the 1995 agreement, half of the construction costs were covered by the Polish state and the other half by donors from the United States.

On 1 January 2004, the Museum – Memorial Site in Bełżec was established. It has the status of a branch of the Majdanek State Museum. Its first director was Robert Kuwałek. On 3 June 2004, the new memorial complex was officially unveiled. The ceremony was attended by, among others, President Aleksander Kwaśniewski, representatives of the AJC, ambassadors of Germany, Israel, and the United States, as well as relatives of the victims.

== Monument-Cemetery ==
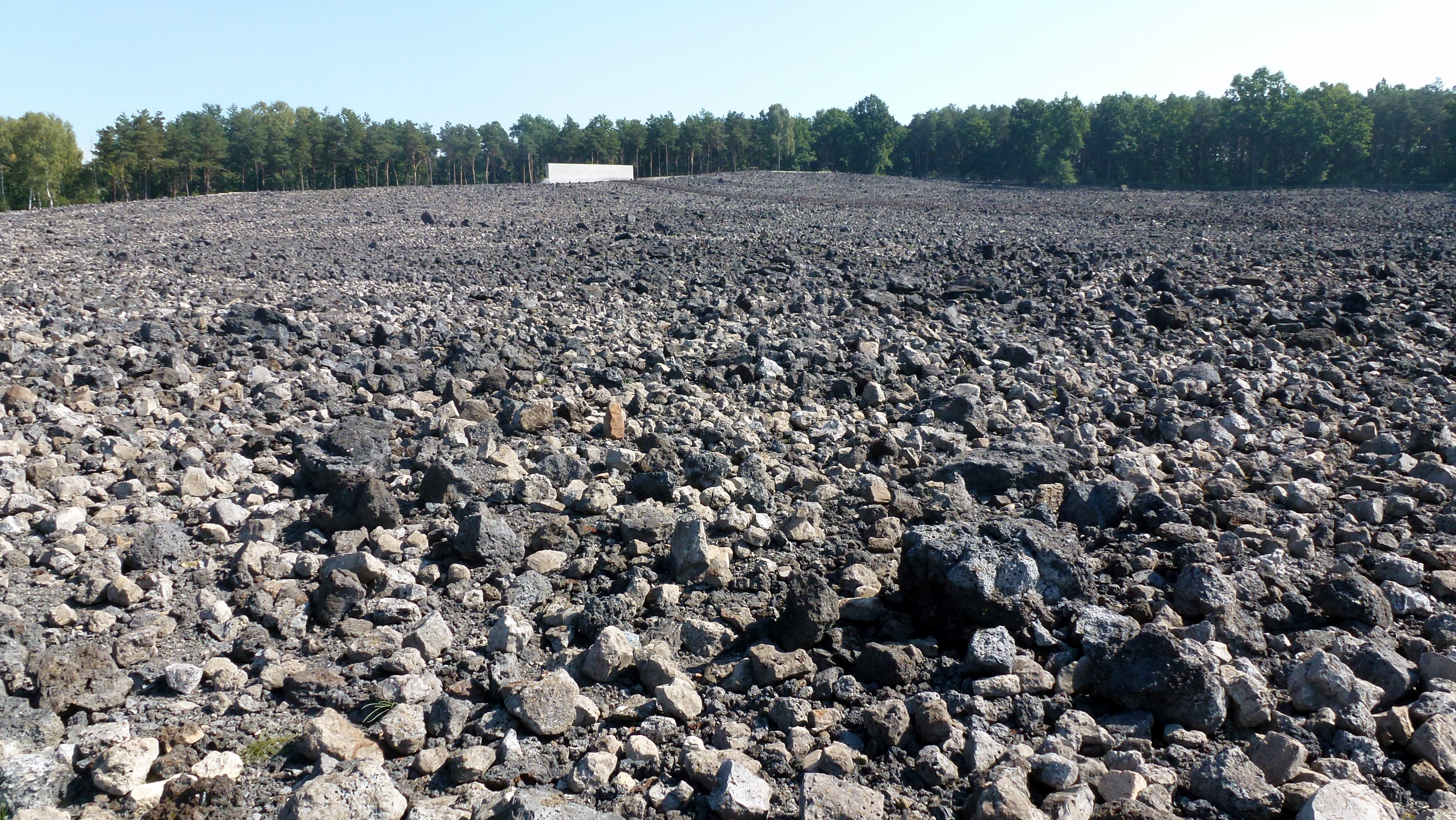
Layer of slag covering the memorial site

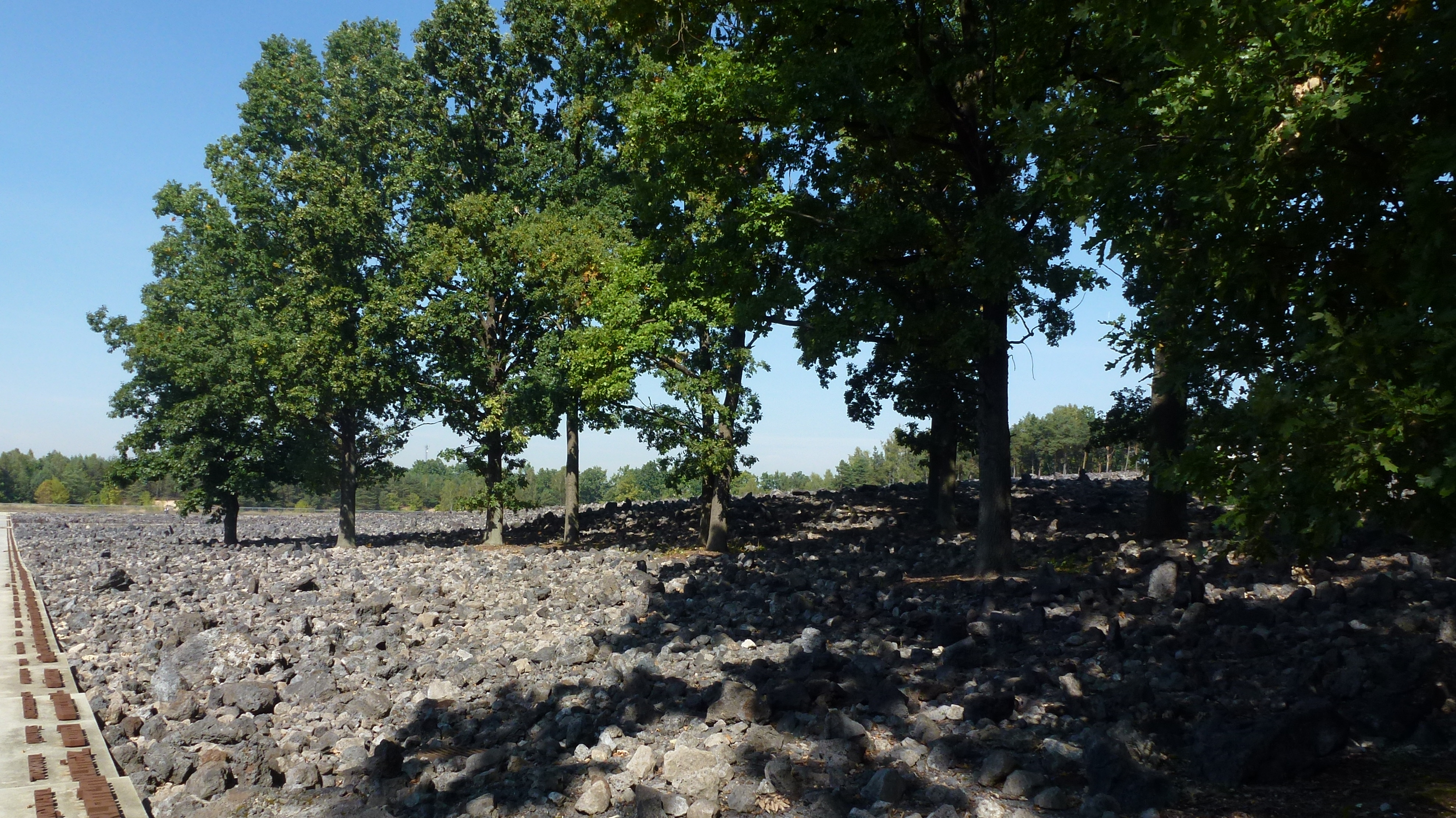
Trees – "mute witnesses"

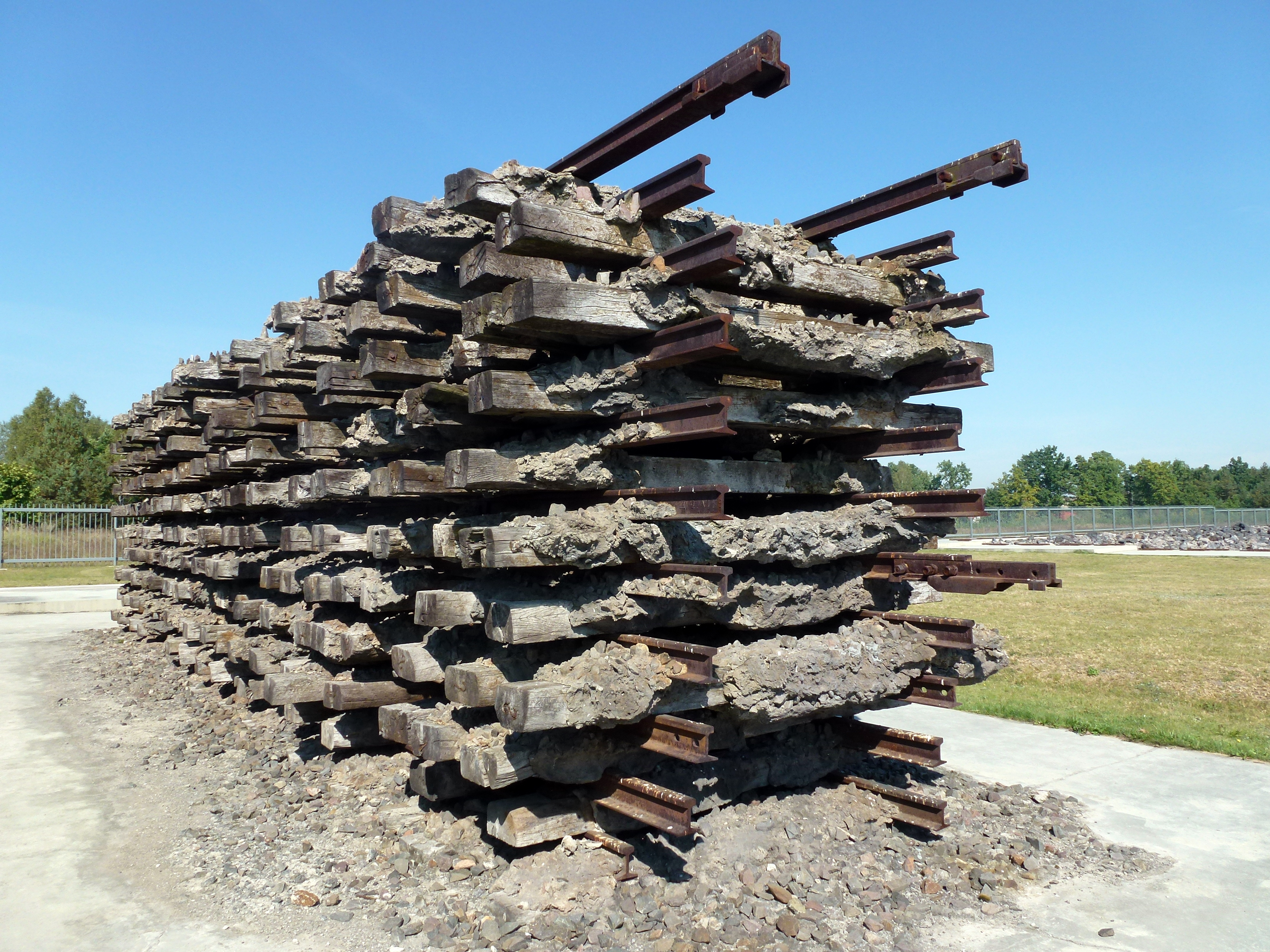
Pile of railway rails and slag

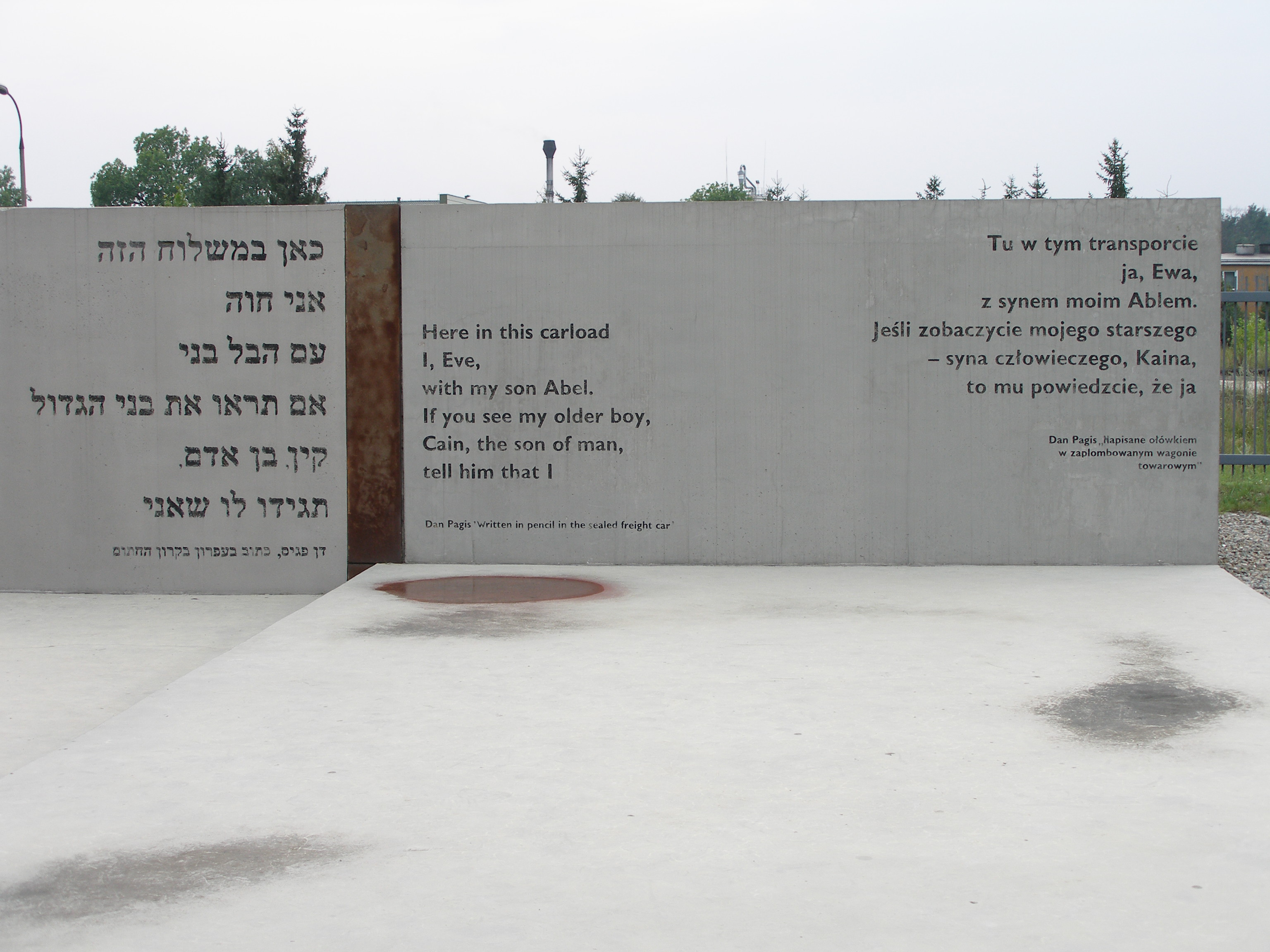
Wall with a poem by Dan Pagis engraved

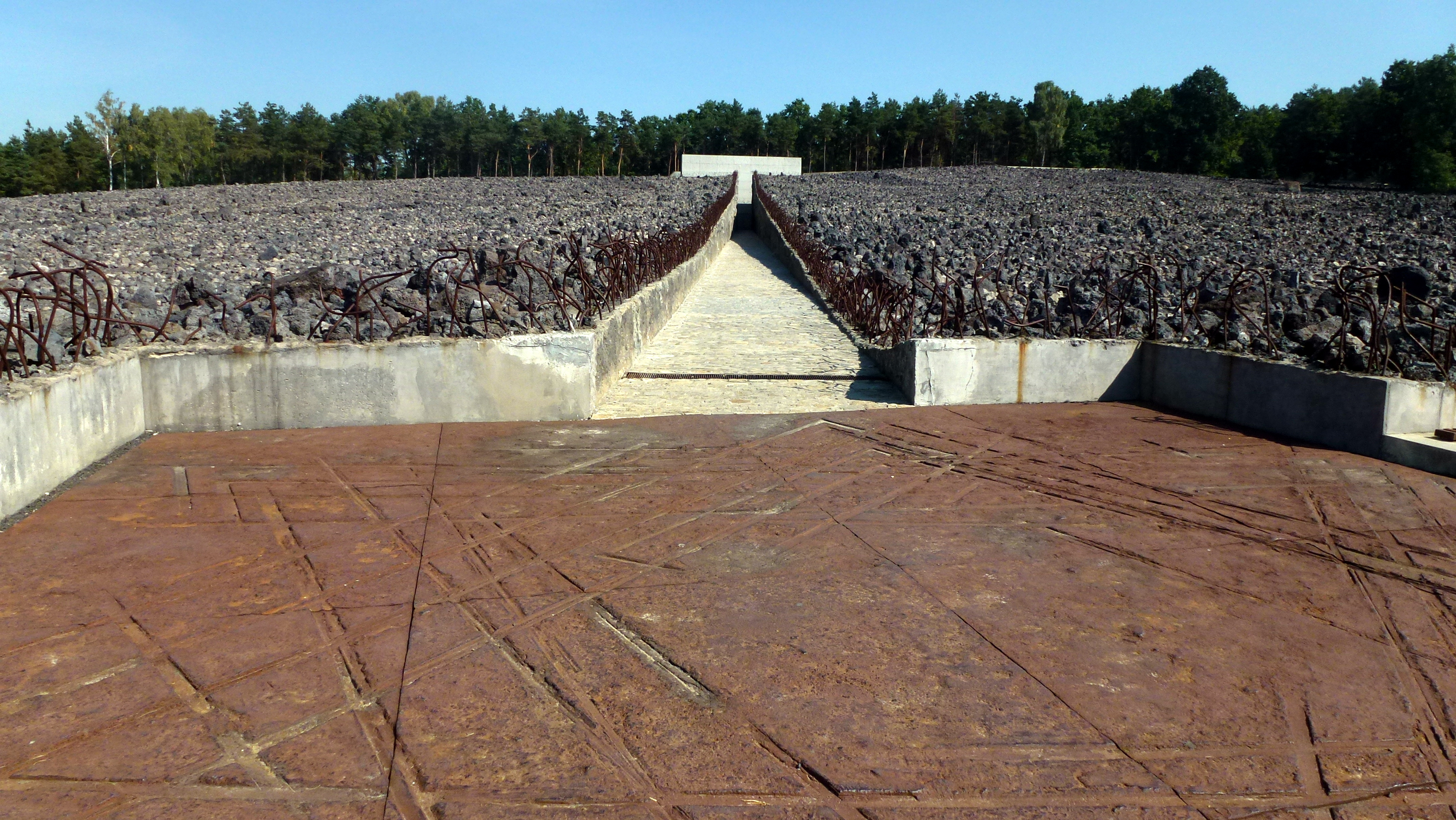
"Place of Crossing". In the background, the entrance to the "Crevice"

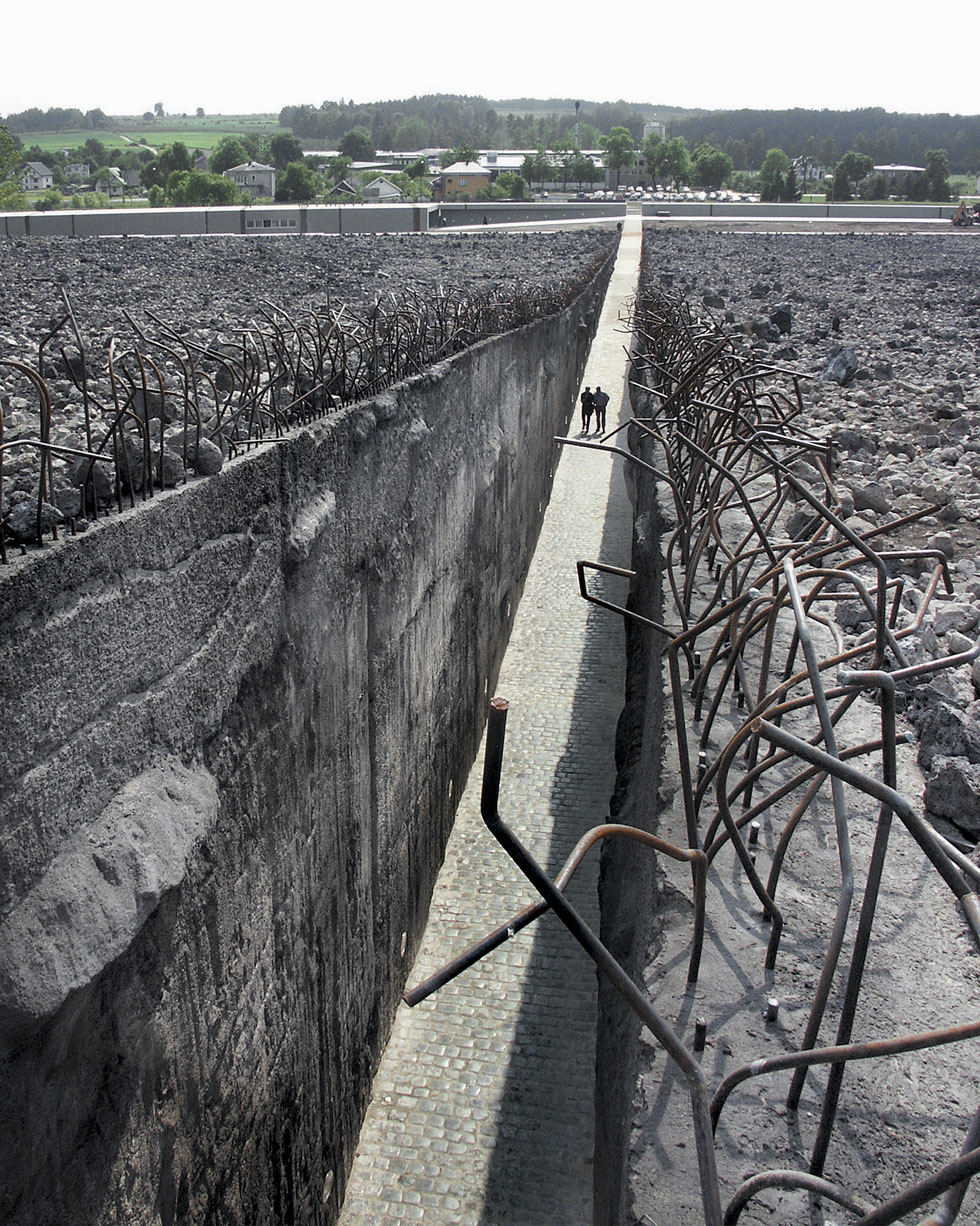
Aerial view of the "Crevice"

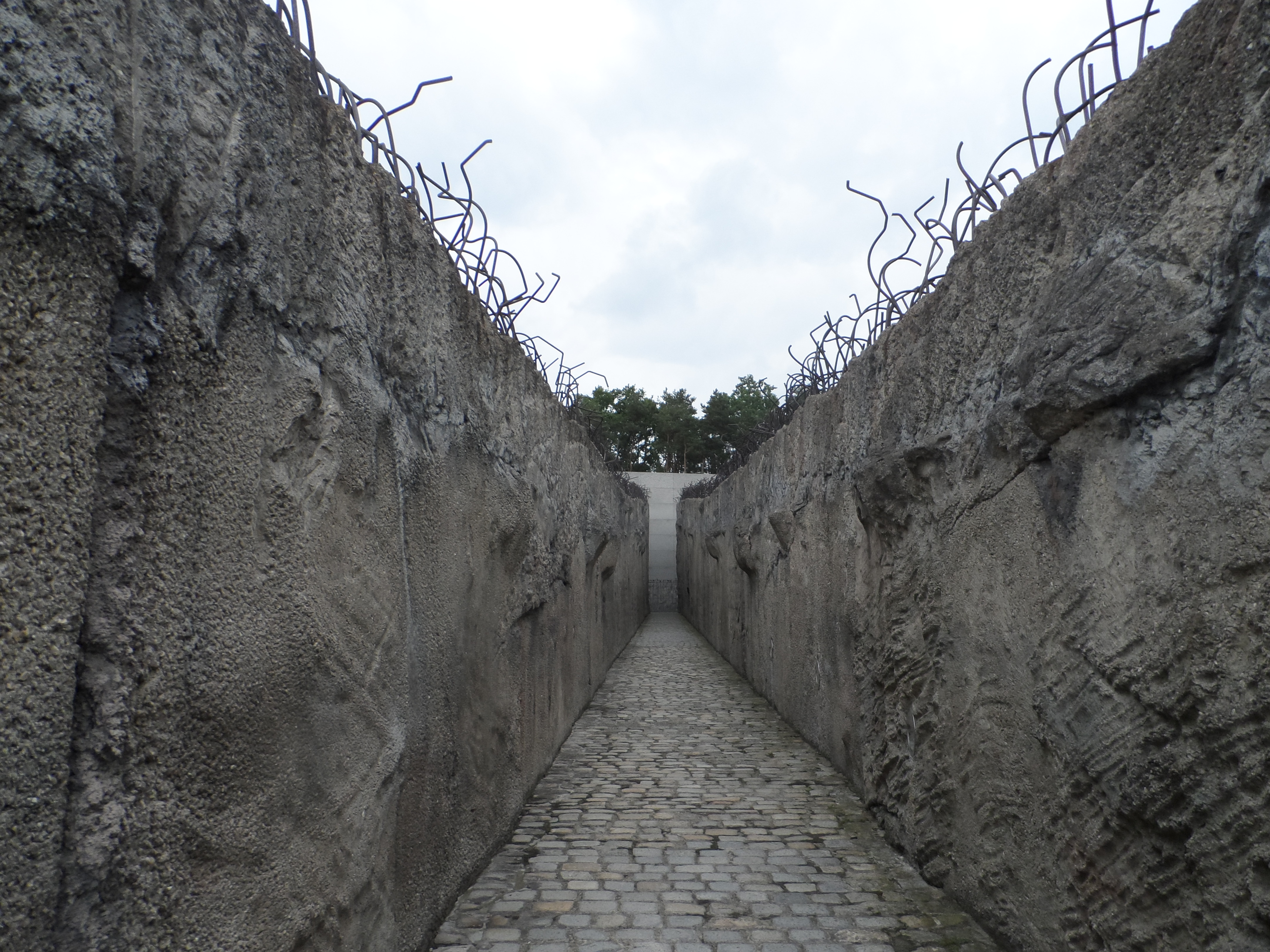
"Crevice" seen from the inside. At the end, "Niche-Ohel"

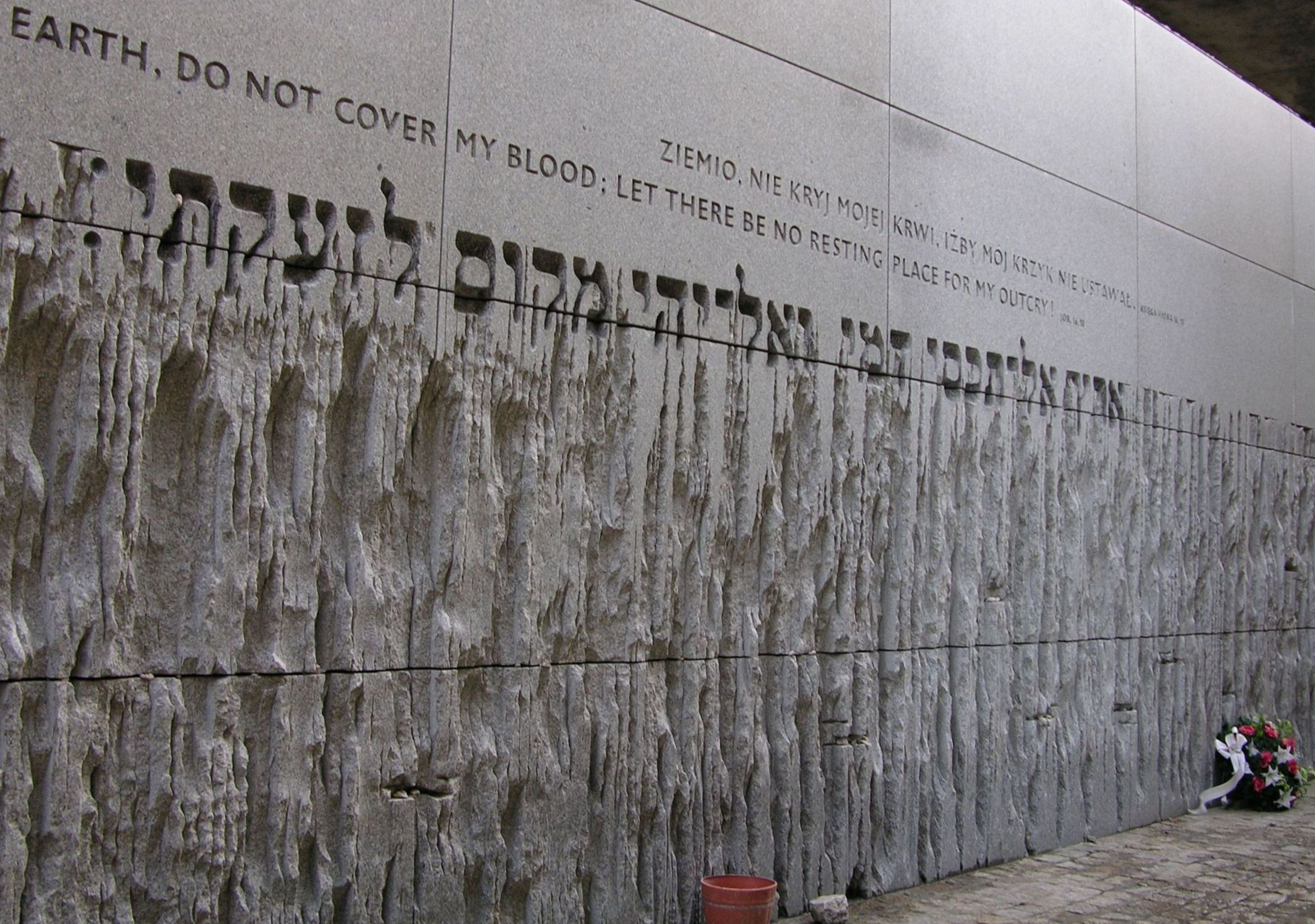
"Niche-Ohel". Wall with a quote from the Book of Job

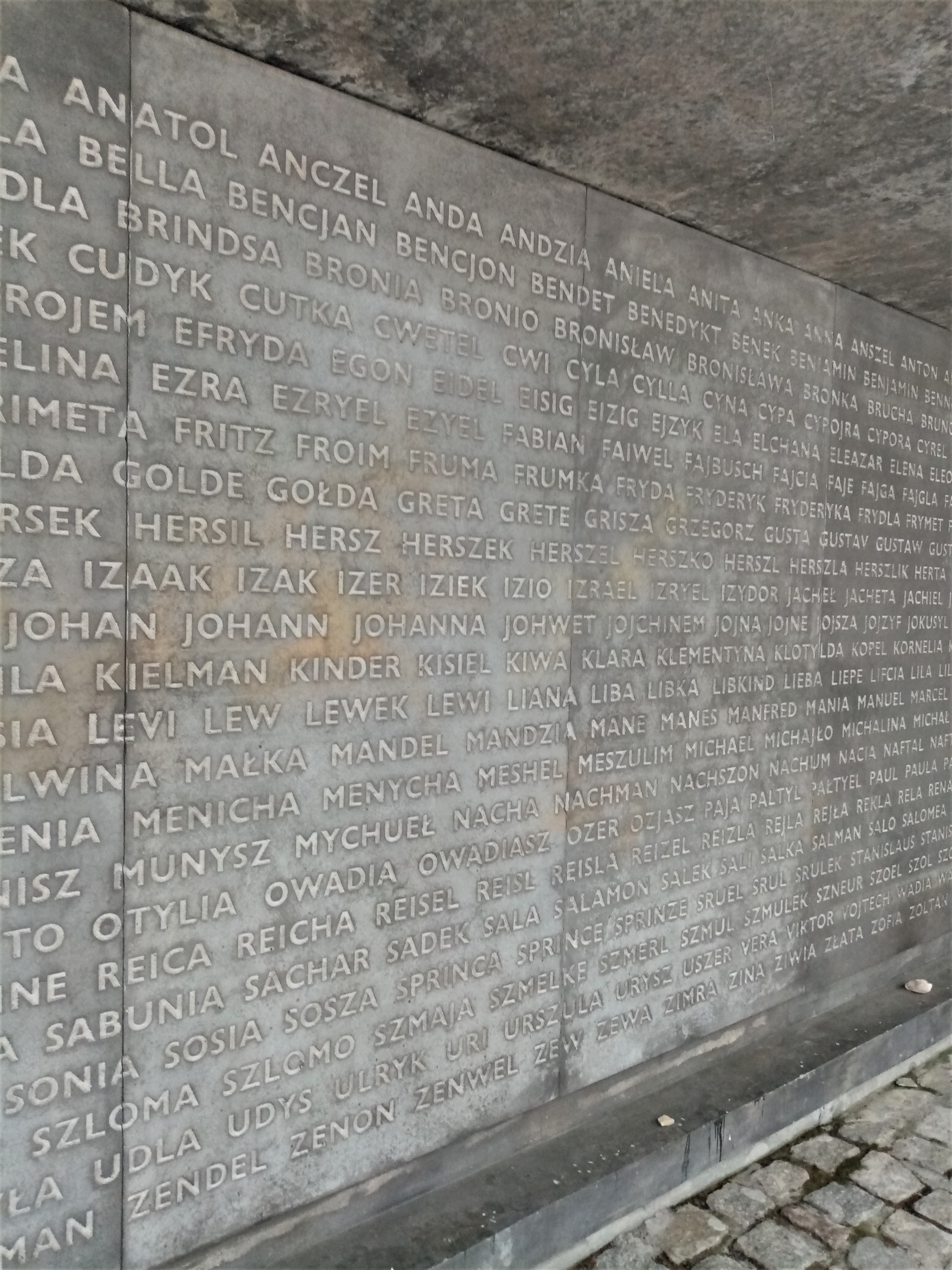
"Niche-Ohel". Plaques with the names of the victims

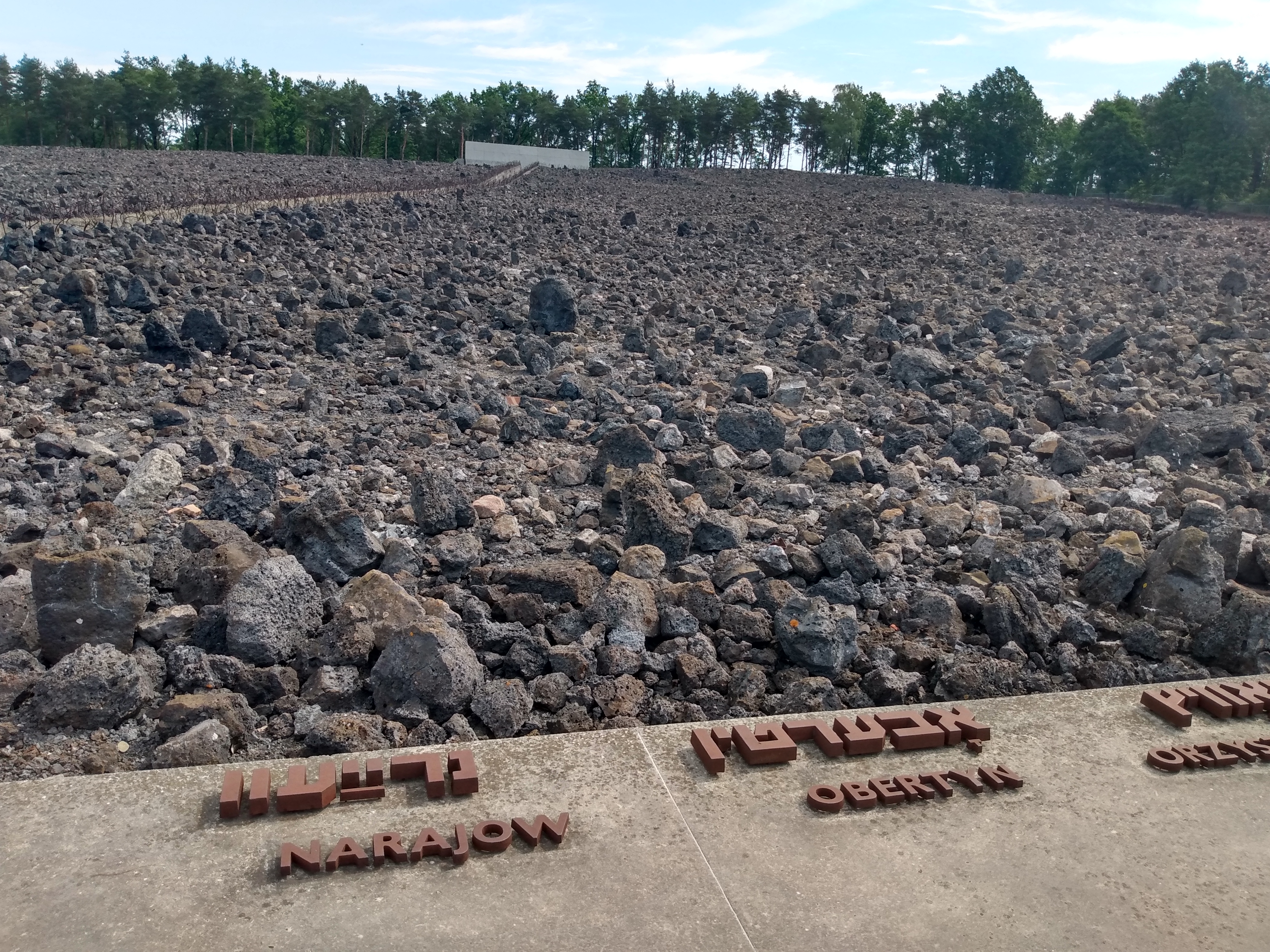
Iron inscriptions with the names of towns from which the victims of the camp came

The new memorial covered the entire area of the former camp site, completely changing its appearance in terms of landscape and architecture. According to the creators' intention, the focus was placed on the protection of mass burial sites and honoring the victims with respect for Jewish traditions and religion. As a result, the most important element of the monument was the space of a symbolic mass grave, covered with a layer of gray-black blast furnace slag and barren soil. It rises gently, reaching a height of 11 meters at its narrowest point. The places where mass graves were located were marked with a greater gradation of material. Several oak trees that grew during the existence of the death camp were preserved on the symbolic grave site. They are referred to as "living monuments" or mute and last "witnesses" to the genocide committed in Bełżec.

The entrance to the memorial site was located where the railway siding had previously been. Behind the main gate, there is a concrete area – a ramp. To the left of the gate, a sculptural installation was built in the form of a pile of railway rails and slag. It symbolizes the transports arriving at Bełżec, as well as the process of cremating bodies on the burning racks. On the concrete wall standing near the pile, a poem by Israeli poet Dan Pagis was engraved.

The symbolic ramp continues into the museum building, made of reinforced concrete, cast iron, and light granite. It is positioned perpendicular to the entrance gate. It is shaped as a single-story, long rectangular building. It features a minimalist aesthetic, with no windows, and only a few vertical divisions in the façade. The museum building, together with the ramp and boundary wall, forms a unified architectural structure, which, when viewed from the Bełżec buildings, resembles a cemetery wall. From the Bełżec side, the height of the building – as well as the adjoining wall – reaches only two meters. Due to the appropriate terrain shaping, it rises only from the interior side of the memorial site. The building gives the impression of being buried in the ground and resembles a railway car depot near the ramp.

On the central axis of the grave-cemetery, the "Crevice" corridor cuts through. It was designated in a place where no remains of mass graves were found. It is likely that the "sluice", a special corridor through which the Germans drove naked victims to the gas chambers, ran in the same place. A narrow road leads from the ramp to the "Crevice". At the intersection with the grave boundary, there is the "Place of Crossing". It is a small square paved with rusted cast iron plates, featuring a relief of the pressed wagon wheels intersecting in the shape of a Star of David. The "Crevice" is framed by stone walls, from the tops of which twisted cast-iron rods protrude at regular intervals. It gradually sinks under the grave to a depth of 9 meters. Its appearance evokes the image of a wound or crack in the earth. It can also be interpreted as a reference to the Jewish custom of tearing clothes as a sign of mourning. According to Marta Leśniakowska:

The Crevice-Road, through the increasing height of the walls and the echo of footsteps, evokes the horror of this place with full force, from which there is no return.

The "Crevice" leads to the "Niche-Ohel". In front of the exit, on a high wall made of light granite, a quote from the Book of Job was carved in Hebrew, Polish, and English:

Earth, do not cover my blood, that my cry may not cease

On the other side of the "Niche", there are stone plaques with the Jewish names of those murdered in the camp. (Note: The names were determined based on archival research (Kuwałek (2010, p. 231)).) Nearby, on the left side of the "Niche", is the date "17 III 1942". It commemorates the day the first transports arrived. The "Niche-Ohel" is the lowest zone in the monument structure.

The stairs located on both sides of the "Niche" lead to the surface, to a path that runs along the perimeter of the grave-cemetery. Along this path, the names of the towns from which the victims of Bełżec came are displayed. They are made of corroding cast iron, symbolizing the bloody tears of the murdered. In this way, around 400 Jewish communities from the territories of the Second Polish Republic, as well as about 40 Jewish communities from Austria, the Czech Republic, Germany, and Slovakia, were commemorated. The names of Polish towns were inscribed in Polish and Yiddish and arranged chronologically – according to the dates of the transports' arrivals at Bełżec. The names of foreign towns, however, were inscribed in national languages and in Hebrew. They are placed at the end of the list and arranged alphabetically. The path is called the "Cast-Iron Perimeter". It is a place where candles can be lit or, according to Jewish tradition, memorial stones can be placed.

Movement around the memorial site is allowed only through the "Crevice", around the perimeter of the grave, and through the museum's rooms. The area covered with slag is inaccessible to visitors.

The Monument-Cemetery in Bełżec received significant interest and acclaim from art critics, both Polish and foreign. It has been placed among the "most magnificent achievements of commemorative art". According to Jerzy Stanisław Majewski, the memorial site in Bełżec is "the most successful memorial in Poland since the construction of the monument in Treblinka". Jerzy Halbersztadt, on the other hand, assessed that the Bełżec monument "will become, along with Treblinka, a point of reference for monumental art worldwide", and that solutions such as the "Crevice" and the slag-covered grave area "will surely find their way into textbooks at art academies worldwide". In Agnieszka Gębczyńska-Janowicz's opinion, the monument "masterfully achieves a synergy of arts". Marta Leśniakowska, meanwhile, points out that it combines art and nature and describes it as one of the most important examples of the "anti-monument philosophy" worldwide. She also assesses that the memorial site in Bełżec, "despite its outstanding level", has not been sufficiently appreciated, as evidenced by the fact that it received only a special award in the architectural competition for the best realization in Poland in 2004.

== Museum ==
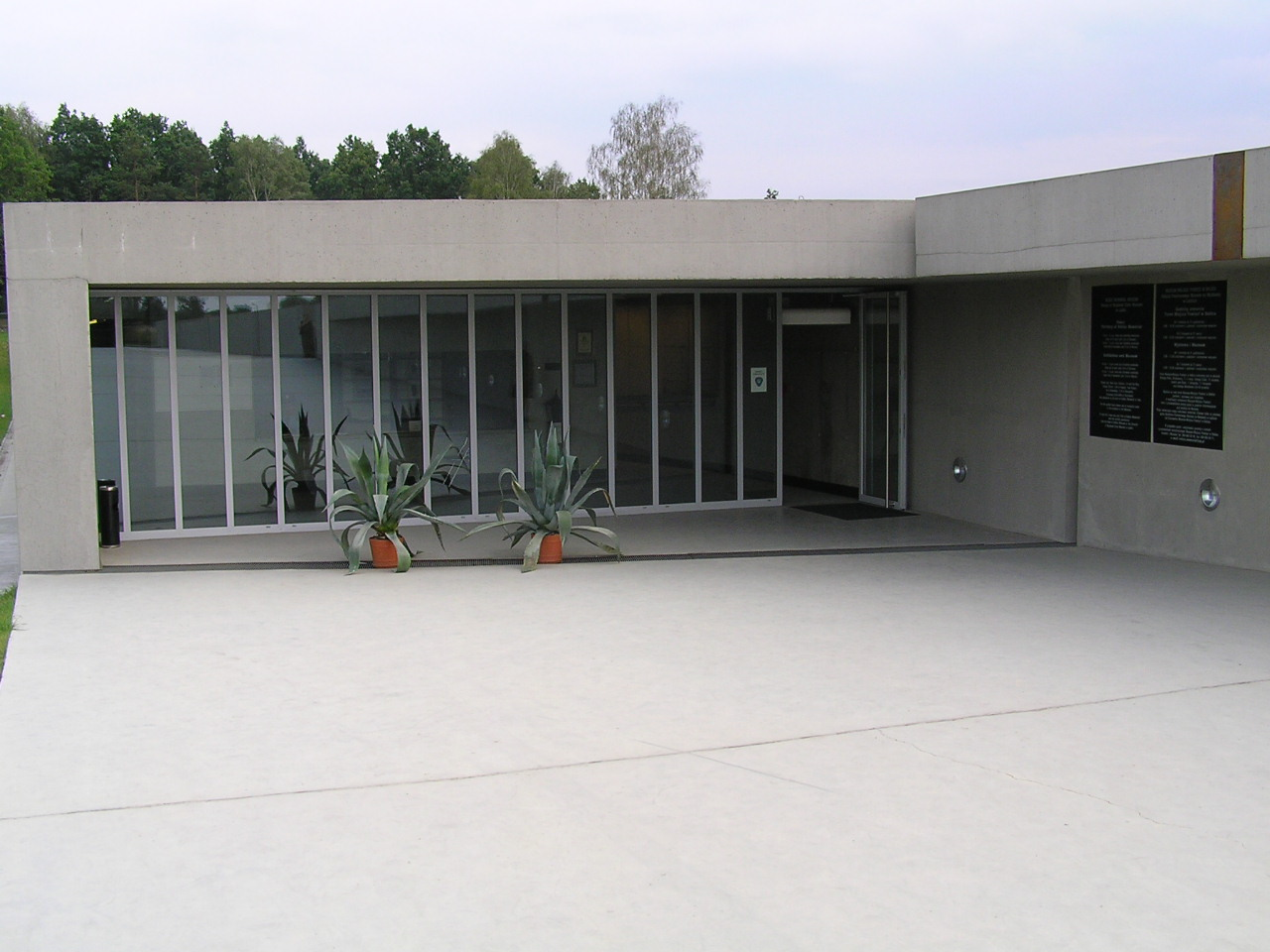
Museum building

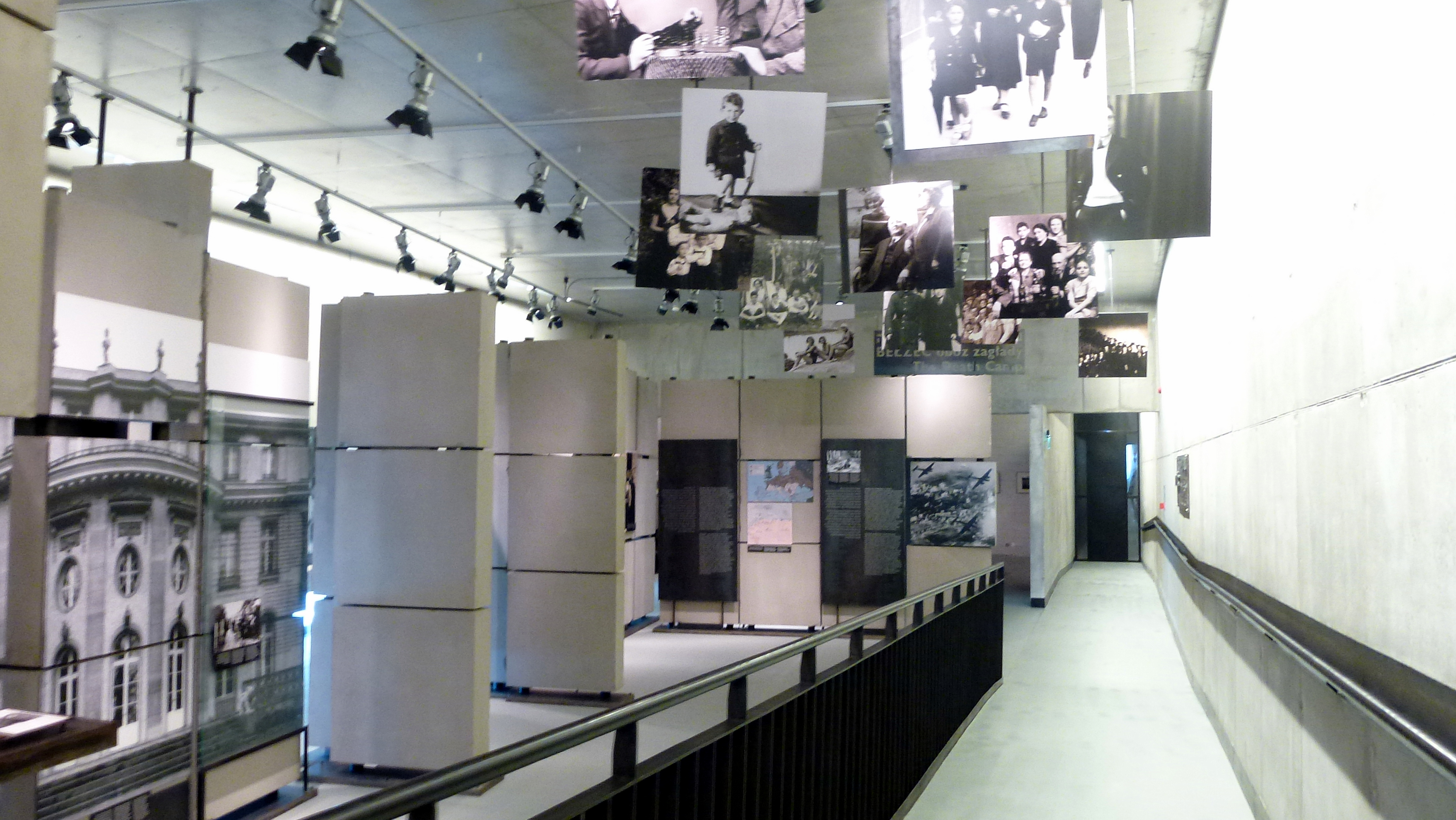
Part of the exhibition

The museum building houses an exhibition hall, an auditorium, office spaces, as well as a contemplation room intended for prayer and meditation. The latter – empty and shrouded in darkness – may evoke associations with a gas chamber. In the contemplation room, a plaque from the old monument has been placed.

The museum presents a permanent exhibition depicting the history of the extermination camp and the genocidal policies pursued by the German occupiers in the General Government. It has a multimedia character; the narrative is conveyed using photographs and audiovisual materials. The exhibition also features preserved artifacts, including a sign with instructions that was located in the camp's "undressing room" (Note: The plaque bears the following inscription in Polish: "Attention! Complete removal of clothing. All items brought, except for money, valuables, documents, and footwear, should be left at the undressing area. Money, valuables, and documents should be kept with you and handed over at the window, without releasing them from your hands. Footwear should be tied in pairs and placed at the designated spot. Completely undressed, proceed to the bath and inhalation" (Kuwałek (2010, p. 132)).) and everyday items found on the campgrounds during archaeological research. The exhibition's script was developed by a team of experts from Poland and the United States, while its visual design was prepared by Mirosław Nizio's design office in cooperation with the American firm Gallagher Associates. The exhibition has been appreciated by specialists, among other reasons, for its accessibility and minimalism.

The museum documents the history of the extermination camp. Particular importance is placed on gathering information about the victims. The museum archive holds copies of testimonies and materials obtained during the investigation conducted by the Chief Commission for the Prosecution of Crimes against the Polish Nation regarding the crimes committed in Bełżec. It also includes copies of some testimonies given by former members of the camp's staff during the investigation preceding their trial in Munich between 1964 and 1965. The museum received these materials from the Central Office of the State Justice Administrations for the Investigation of National Socialist Crimes in Ludwigsburg.

The museum also engages in educational activities aimed at children aged 14 and above as well as adults. These include museum lessons, historical workshops, educational seminars for teachers and cultural workers, and meetings with Holocaust survivors. The museum cooperates with other institutions, including the Yad Vashem, in organizing meetings and seminars. Educational activities focus on issues related to the history of the extermination camp but are also extended to other topics, such as the history, religion, and culture of Jews.

Commemorative ceremonies for the victims of the camp are held every year on 17 March, the anniversary of the arrival of the first transports from the ghettos in Lublin and Lviv. These ceremonies are usually attended by local authorities and school youth; higher-level participants can mainly be seen during round anniversaries.

Within a few years of its establishment, the Museum – Memorial Site saw a nearly twentyfold increase in visitors. In 2015, it was visited by over 25,000 people, including more than 5,000 foreign guests.

In December 2015, the Museum – Memorial Site took over the building of the former camp commandant's office from Polish State Railways, located on Lwowska Street in Bełżec.

In 2005, the museum's headquarters was distinguished by being included on the list of Poland. Icons of Architecture.

== Bibliography ==
- Koper, Ewa (2017). "Muzeum – Miejsce Pamięci w Bełżcu" [Museum – Memorial Site in Bełżec]. In Rejman, Krzysztof; Wierzbieniec, Wacław (eds.). Zagadnienia religijne i narodowościowe we współczesnych badaniach polskich, słowackich i ukraińskich na terenie euroregionu karpackiego. Aspekt historyczny, socjologiczny i politologiczny [Religious and National Issues in Contemporary Polish, Slovak, and Ukrainian Research in the Carpathian Euroregion. Historical, Sociological, and Political Aspects] (in Polish). Jarosław: Wydawnictwo Państwowej Wyższej Szkoły Techniczno-Ekonomicznej im. Ks. Bronisława Markiewicza w Jarosławiu. ISBN 978-83-63909-98-7.
- Kuwałek, Robert (2013). "Były obóz koncentracyjny na Majdanku i miejsca zagłady na Lubelszczyźnie w prasie i świadomości mieszkańców (1944–1956)" [The Former Concentration Camp at Majdanek and the Extermination Sites in Lublin Land in the Press and the Consciousness of the Residents (1944–1956)]. In Bartuś, Alicja (ed.). Słowa w służbie nienawiści [Words in the Service of Hatred] (in Polish). Oświęcim: Państwowe Muzeum Auschwitz-Birkenau. ISBN 978-83-934748-7-5.
- Kuwałek, Robert (2005). "Muzeum-Miejsce Pamięci w Bełżcu – po roku działalności" [The Museum-Memorial Site in Bełżec – After One Year of Operation]. Zagłada Żydów: Studia i materiały (in Polish). 1. ISSN 1895-247X.
- Kuwałek, Robert (2010). Obóz zagłady w Bełżcu [Extermination Camp in Bełżec] (in Polish). Lublin: Państwowe Muzeum na Majdanku. ISBN 978-83-925187-8-5.
- Małczyński, Jacek (2009). "Drzewa "żywe pomniki" w Muzeum-Miejscu Pamięci w Bełżcu" [Trees as "Living Memorials" at the Museum-Memorial Site in Bełżec]. Teksty Drugie (in Polish). 1 (115). ISSN 0867-0633.
