= Bełżec (village) =

- Village
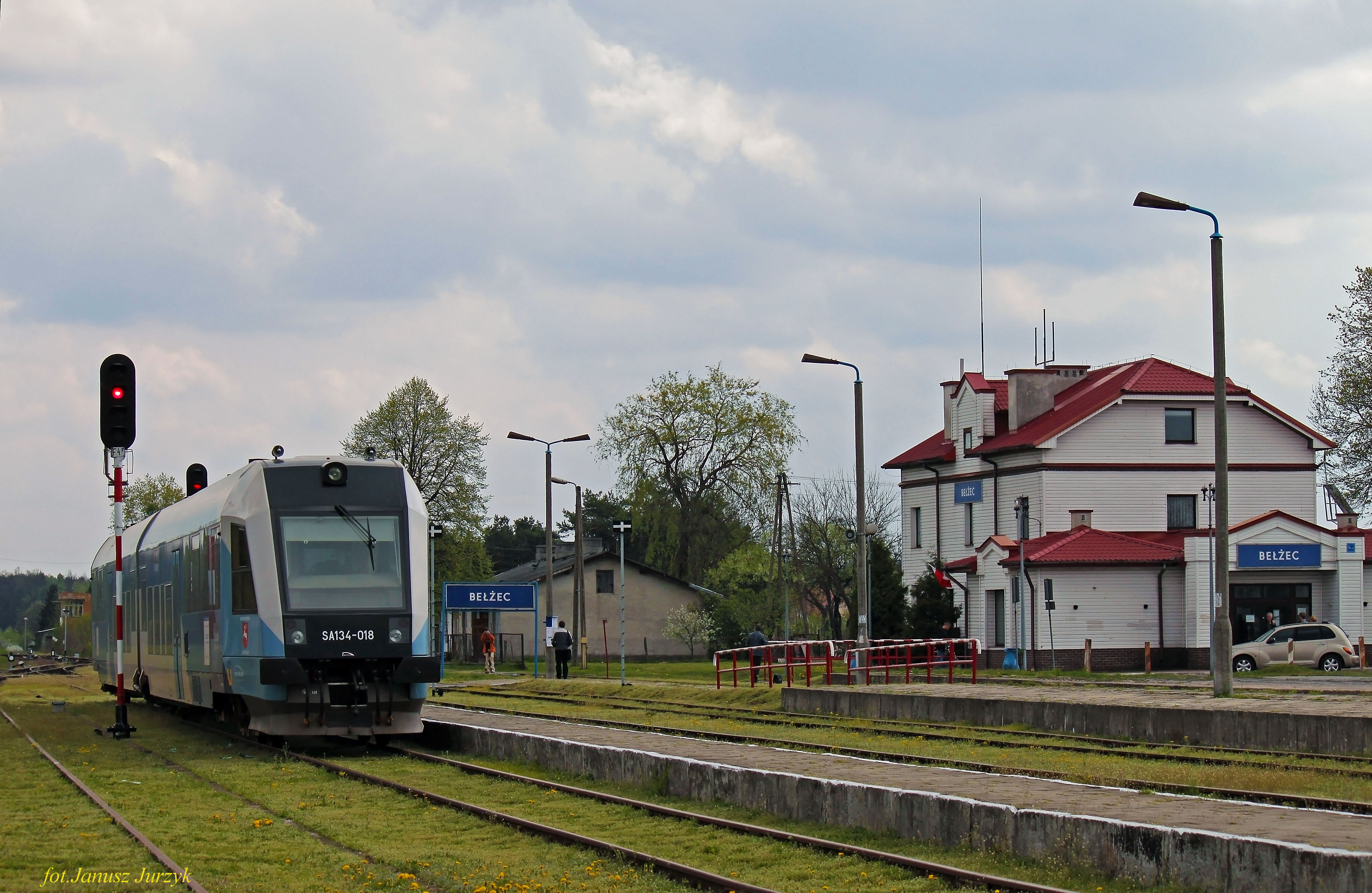
- Train station in Bełżec

- Coat of arms

- Location within Poland
- Coordinates: 50°23′N 23°26′E
- Country: Poland
- Voivodeship: Lublin
- County: Tomaszów
- Gmina: Bełżec
- First mentioned: 1515

Population (2011)
  - Total: 2,723
- Time zone: UTC+1 (CET)
  - Summer (DST): UTC+2 (CEST)
- ISO 3166 code: POL
- Vehicle registration: LTM
- Website: http://www.belzec.pl

Bełżec (English: /ˈbɛl.zɛk/ or /ˈbɛl.ʒɛts/, Polish: [ˈbɛu̯ʐɛt͡s]) is a village in Tomaszów County, Lublin Voivodeship, in eastern Poland. It is the seat of the gmina (administrative district) of Gmina Bełżec. It is located in the Roztocze region.

During World War II, the village was the site of the Nazi German Belzec extermination camp.

== History ==
Bełżec was first mentioned in a document from 1515, after it was founded within territory of the village of Przeorsko, which in turn was founded in the 15th century by the Małdrzyk family. As of 1546, Bełżec was a private village of the Bełżecki noble family. Thanks to efforts of local nobleman Samuel Lipski, Bełżec was granted town rights by Polish King Sigismund III Vasa in 1607, however, it did not develop properly, and several decades later it was yet again referred to as a village. The King also established two annual fairs. The Grabie coat of arms of the Lipski family is the coat of arms of Bełżec. Administratively, the village was located in the Bełz County in the Bełz Voivodeship in the Lesser Poland Province of the Kingdom of Poland. In 1648 it was destroyed by the Cossacks, and during the Swedish invasion of Poland of 1655–1660, known as the Deluge, a battle was fought nearby between Poles led by Hetman Stefan Czarniecki and the Swedes.

The village was annexed by Austria in the First Partition of Poland in 1772. It was regained by Poles in the Austro-Polish War of 1809, and included within the short-lived Duchy of Warsaw. Following the duchy's dissolution in 1815, it fell again to the Austrian Partition of Poland, also known as Galicia, and was located on the border with the Russian Partition. In 1887, Bełżec was connected by rail to Lwów, one of the largest agglomerations in the region, via Rawa Ruska (now in western Ukraine). Bełżec became a full-fledged rail hub in 1916, with a new connection to Lublin via Rejowiec and a layover yard with a bigengine-house. Following World War I, in 1918, Poland regained independence and control of the village. In 1921, Bełżec was visited by Marshal of Poland Józef Piłsudski.

=== World War II ===
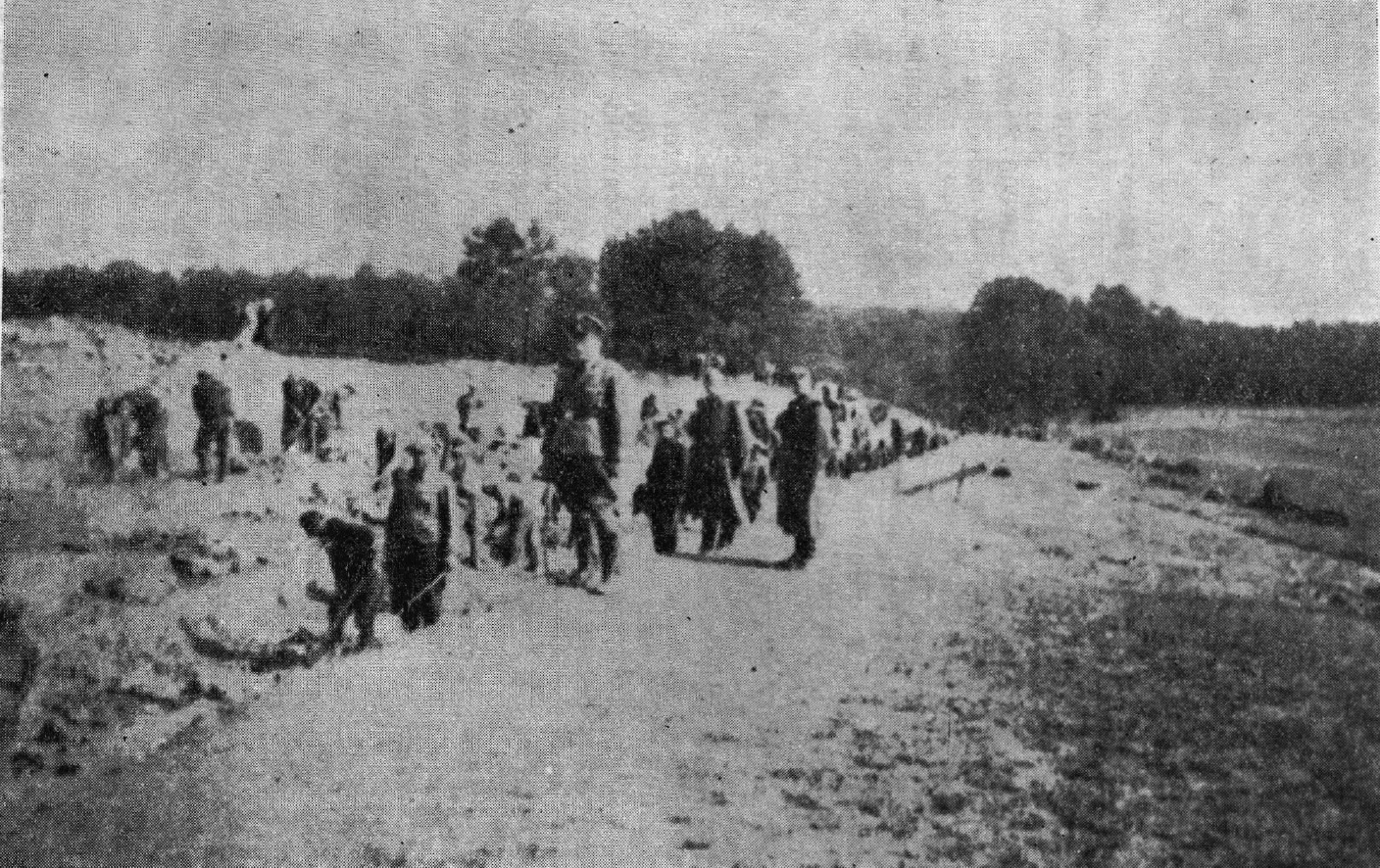
Forced laborers building fortifications under German occupation in 1940

On 19 September 1939, during the joint German-Soviet invasion of Poland which started World War II, it was the site of the Battle of Bełżec between Poland and Germany. Afterwards, the village was occupied by Germany. It was located on the border of three new districts of the General Government of Poland created by Nazi Germany: Lublin District, Kraków District and District of Galicia (created on 1 September 1941 soon after Operation Barbarossa) with the capital in Lwów.

Approximately one million Polish Jews lived there during the Holocaust in occupied Poland in the so-called Lublin reservation. In 1940, the Germans established two forced labour camps: for Jews, and for the Romani and Sinti. Polish people were also deported to forced labour in Bełżec. In 1941, the occupiers began the construction of the Bełżec extermination camp on the Kozielsk Hill some 500 metres (1,600 ft) from the railway station, at the site of the former forced labour camp for Jews. The first stationary gas chambers of the Final Solution were built there. Between 430,000 and 500,000 people are believed to have been murdered at the camp between March and December 1942. The victims were mostly Jews from various German-occupied countries, but also Romani people and Poles. In 1943, the Germans used Jewish forced laborers to dismantle the camp, and then deported them to the Sobibor extermination camp. During the operation of the camp, the Germans tried to hide its real purpose, and after it was liquidated, they planted a forest in its place.

On 16 June 1944, near Bełżec, Ukrainian nationalists of the UPA carried out an attack on a train that left the local station for Lwów. In the attack, the Ukrainians massacred several dozen Polish men, women and children. A few people survived. The Polish underground Home Army was able to document the crime shortly after it happened.

The Bełżec station was bombed by a Soviet warplane on 4 July 1944, setting fire to munitions and explosives from the German military cargo train. The ensuing explosions and fires consumed over 50 nearby buildings along with the train station itself. Several railway workers were killed. The historic train station was never rebuilt. A new station was erected half a kilometre away in postwar Poland. On 21 July 1944 the village was liberated by the Polish Home Army.

=== Post-war period ===
In 1971, Bełżec was visited by Primate of Poland Stefan Wyszyński and Cardinal Karol Wojtyła (future Pope John Paul II).

== Transport ==
The Polish National road 17 and Voivodeship road 865 run through the village, and there is also a train station.

== Sights ==
There are several World War II memorials in Bełżec, including the Museum and Memorial at the site of the Nazi German Belzec extermination camp, a memorial to Polish soldiers killed in the Battle of Bełżec during the German invasion of Poland in 1939, a monument to the victims of the attack of the Ukrainian nationalists on Polish civilians in 1944, and a memorial at the burial site of the Romani and Sinti victims of the Nazi German forced labour camp. Cultural heritage sites include the historic churches of Our Lady Queen of Poland and of Saint Basil. The over 200-year-old juniper tree in the Zagóra part of the village is a notable natural monument.

== Culture ==
There is a Gmina Culture Center (Gminny Ośrodek Kultury) and a public library in Bełżec.

== Gallery ==
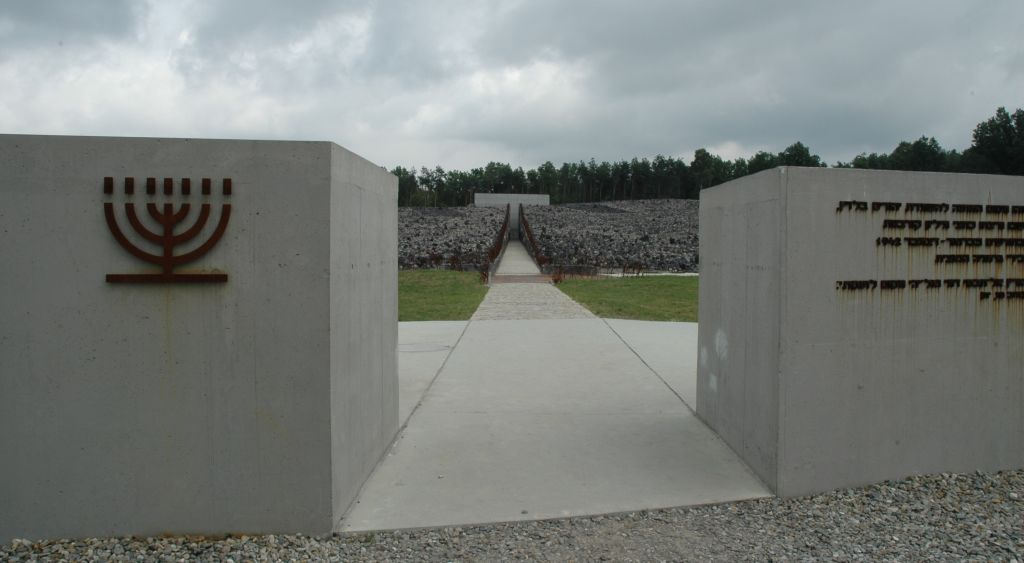
Extermination camp memorial

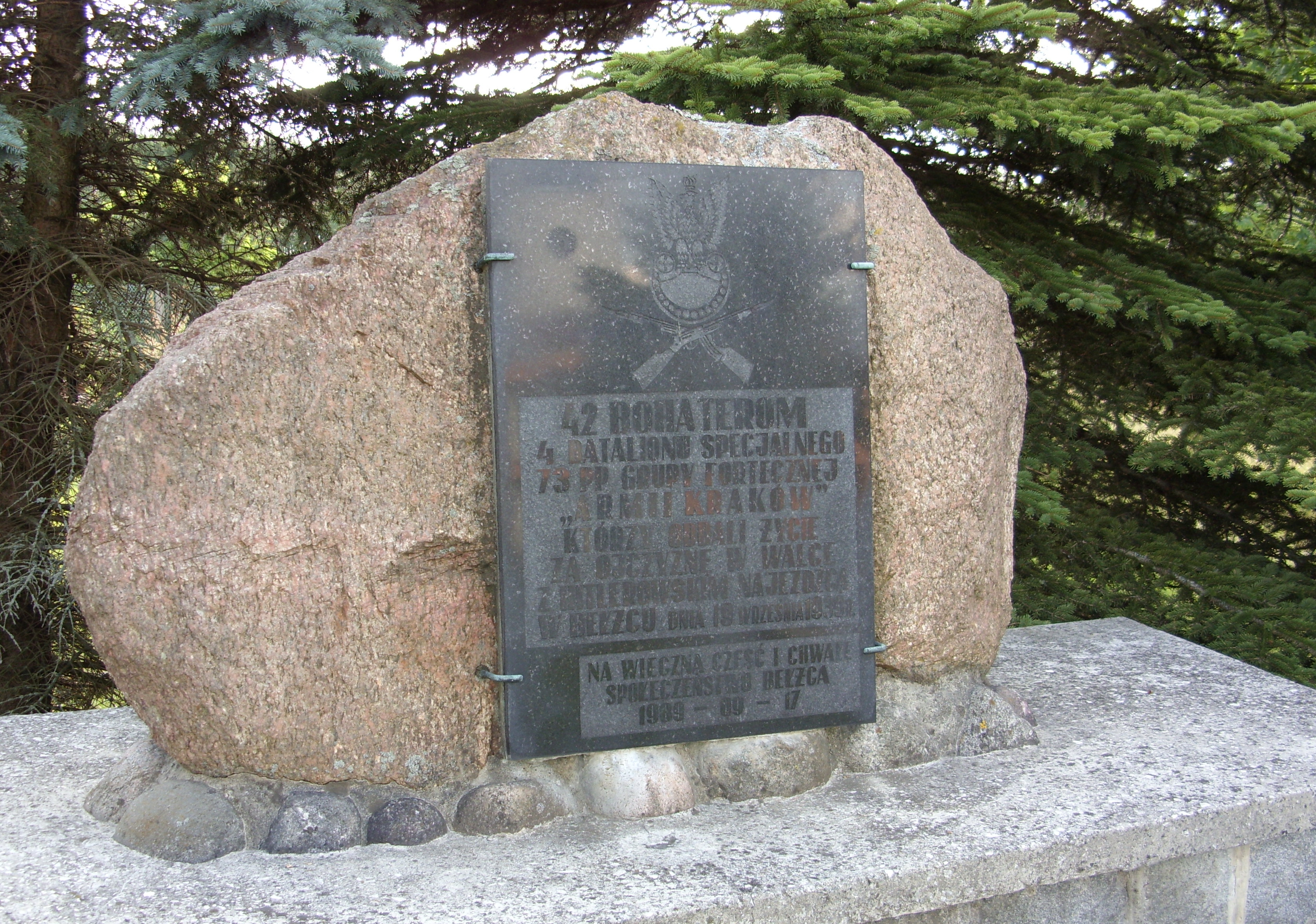
Memorial to Polish soldiers killed in the Battle of Bełżec in 1939

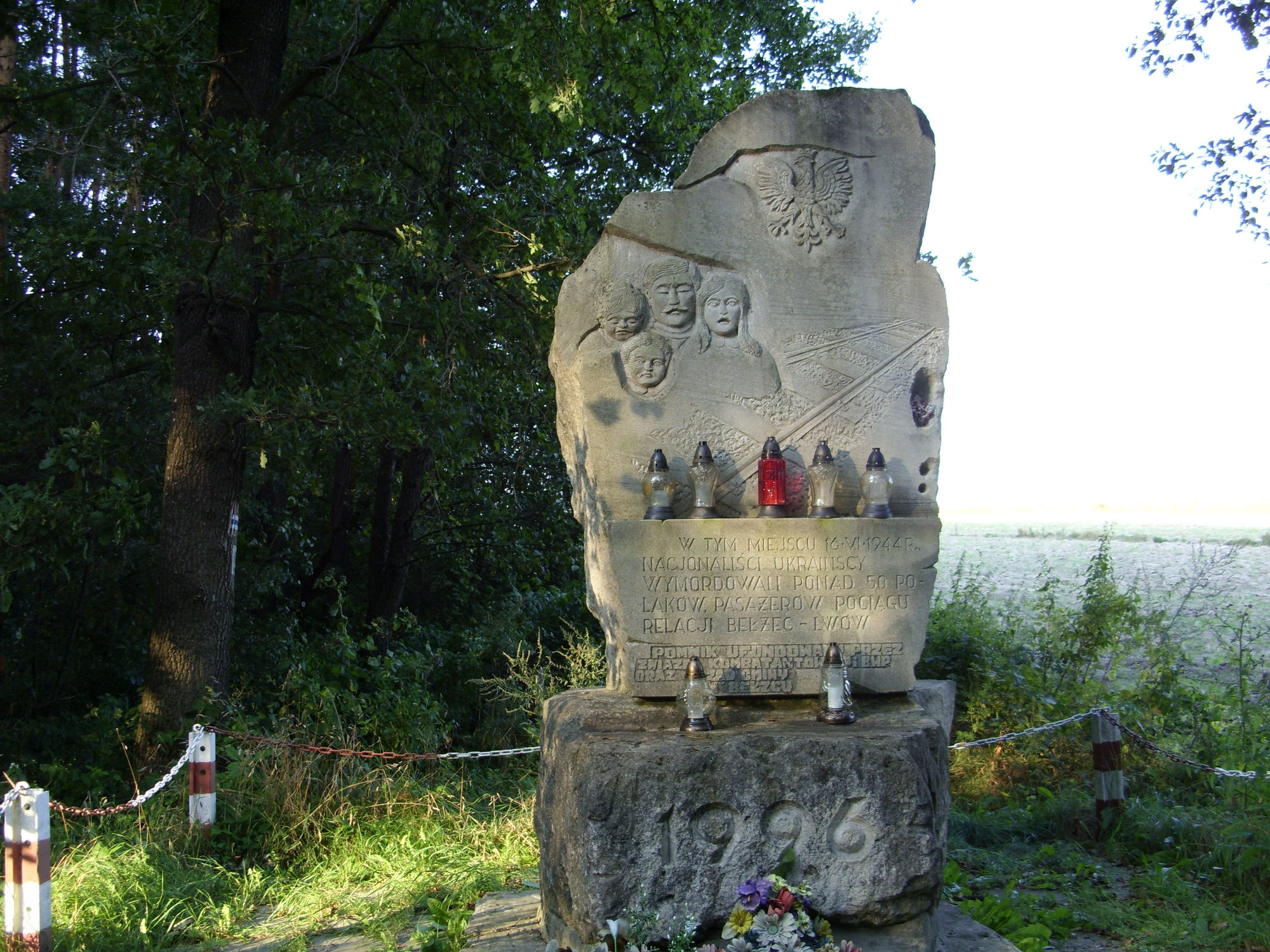
Monument to Poles massacred by Ukrainian nationalists in 1944

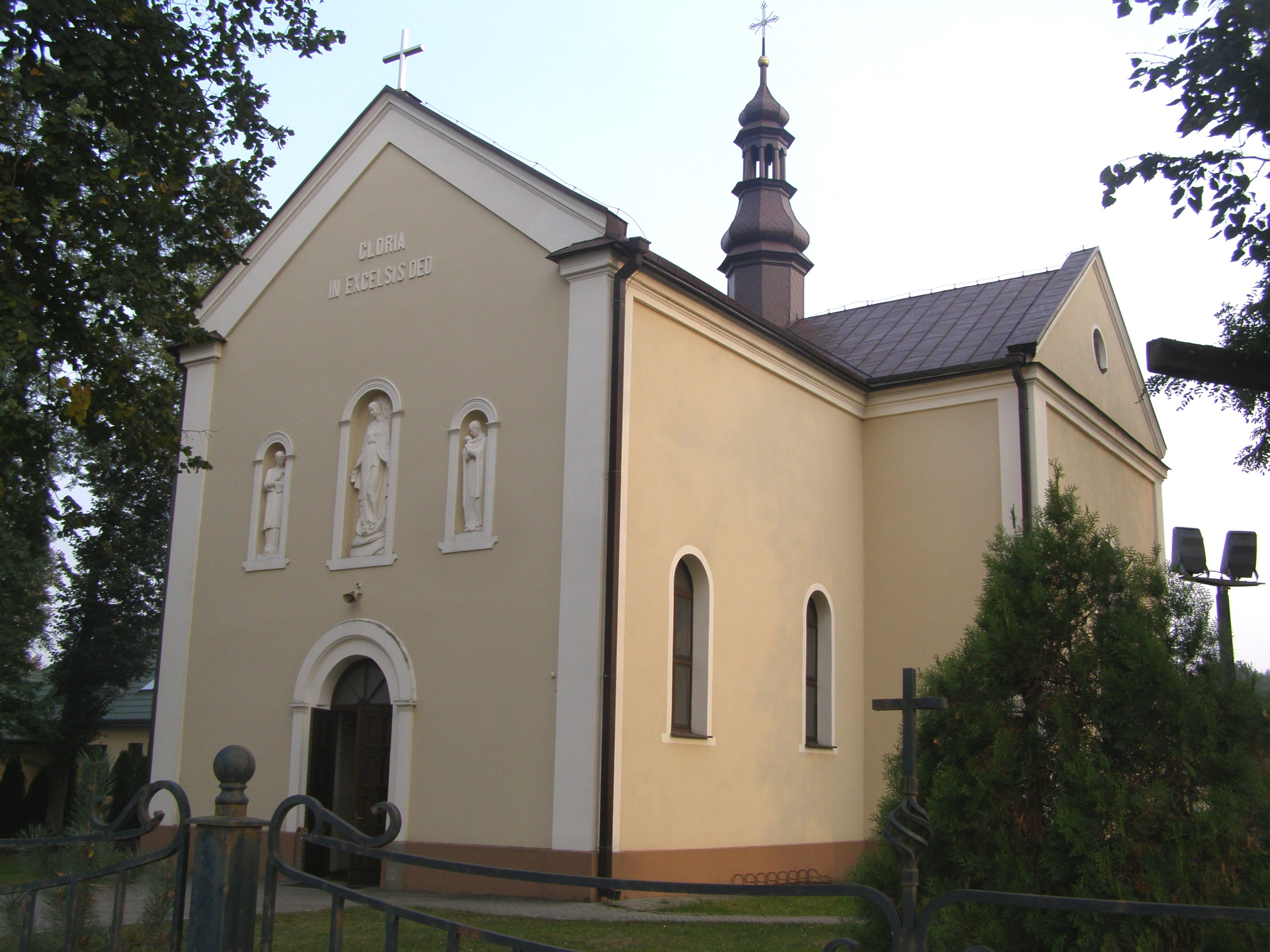
Our Lady Queen of Poland church

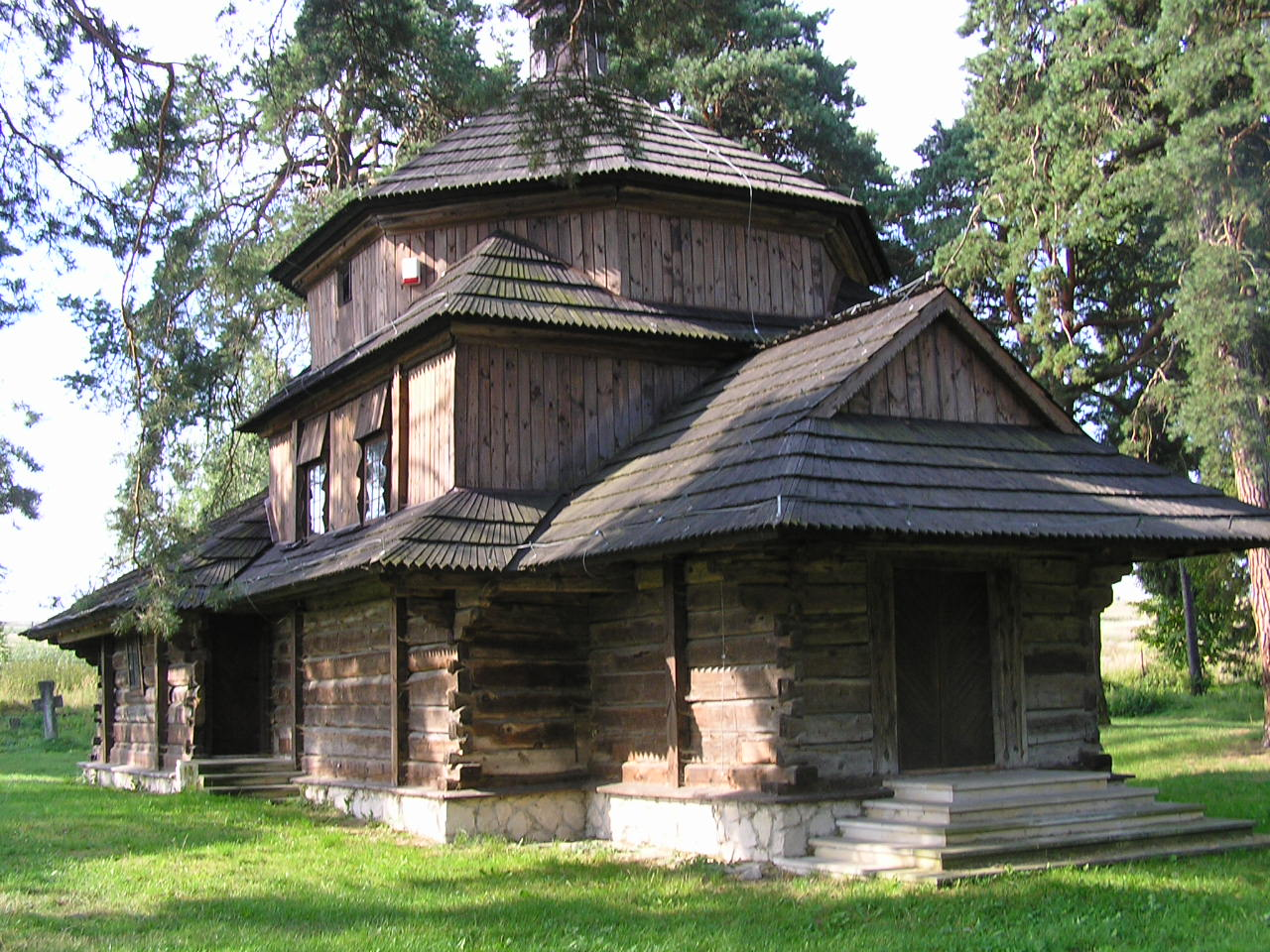
Saint Basil church
