= Dan Pagis =

Israeli poet and lecturer

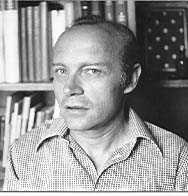
Dan Pagis

Dan Pagis (Hebrew: דן פגיס; October 16, 1930 – June 29, 1986) was an Israeli poet, lecturer, and Holocaust survivor.

== Biography ==
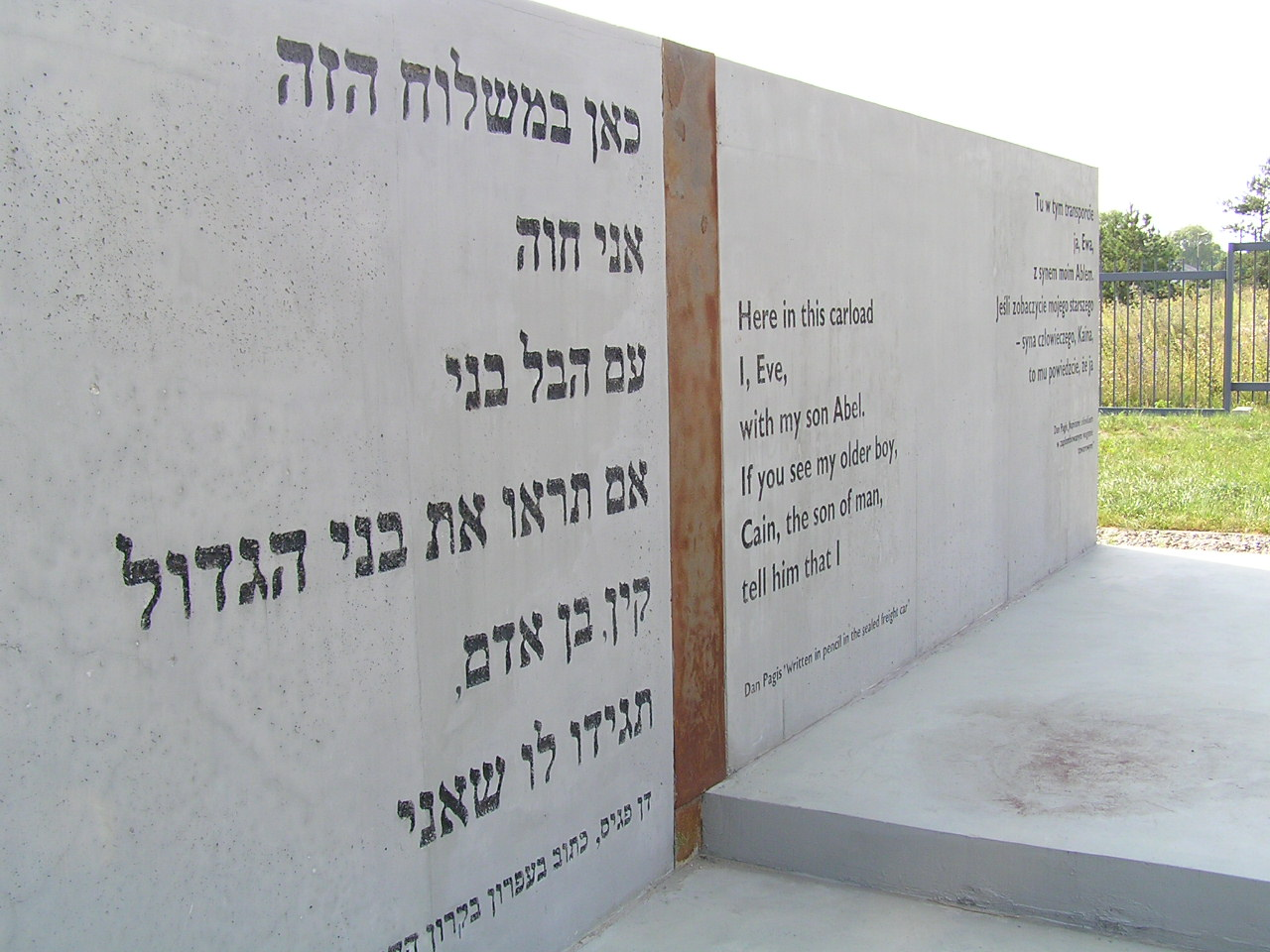
Dan Pagis' poem at the Bełżec Museum and Memorial Site

Dan Pagis was born in Rădăuţi, Bukovina in Romania and imprisoned as a child in a concentration camp in Ukraine. He escaped in 1944 and immigrated to British Palestine (soon-to-be Israel) in 1946.

Pagis earned his PhD from the Hebrew University of Jerusalem where he later taught Medieval Hebrew literature. His first published book of poetry was Sheon ha-Tsel ("The Shadow Clock") in 1959. In 1970 he published a major work entitled Gilgul – which may be translated as "Revolution, cycle, transformation, metamorphosis, metempsychosis," etc. Other poems include: "Written in Pencil in the Sealed Railway-Car," "Testimony, "Europe, Late," "Autobiography," and "Draft of a Reparations Agreement." Pagis knew many languages, and translated multiple works of literature.

Pagis died of cancer in Jerusalem on June 29, 1986.

His most widely cited poem is "Written in Pencil in the Sealed Railway Car".

The literary scholar Nili Gold has described Dan Pagis as an example of a writer whose work reveals the influence of "Mother Tongue" oral and written culture on their Hebrew writing. She has situated Pagis in this way among a group of Hebrew-language writers that includes Yoel Hoffman, Yehuda Amichai, Natan Zach, and Aharon Appelfeld.

== Published works ==
=== Poetry ===
- The Shadow Dial (Sifriat Poalim, 1959 Shaon Ha-Tzel)
- Late Leisure (Sifriat Poalim, 1964 Sheut Meuheret)
- Transformation (Massada/Hebrew Writers Association, 1970 Gilgul)
- Brain (Hakibbutz Hameuchad, 1975 Moah)
- Double Exposure (Hakibbutz Hameuchad, 1982 Milim Nirdafot)
- Twelve Faces (Hakibbutz Hameuchad, 1984 Shneim Asar Panim)
- Last Poems (Hakibbutz Hameuchad, 1987 Shirim Aharonim)
- Collected Poems (Hakibbutz Hameuchad/Bialik Institute, 1991 Col Ha-Shirim)

=== Books for children ===
- An Egg in Disguise (Am Oved, 1973; 1994 Ha-Beitzah She-Hithapsah)

=== Non-fiction ===
- The Poems of Levi Ibn Al-Tabban (Israel Academy of Sciences and Humanities, 1968 [Shirei Levi Ibn Alatabban)
- Secular Poetry and Poetic Theory: Moses Ibn-Ezra and his Contemporaries (Bialik Institute, 1970 [Shirat Ha-Hol Ve-Torat Ha-Shir Le-Moshe Eben Ezra U-Vnei Doro)
- Change and Tradition in Secular Poetry: Spain and Italy (Keter, 1976)
- The Scarlet Thread – Hebrew Love Poems from Spain, Italy, Turkey and the Yemen (edited by Dan Pagis) (Hakibbutz Hameuchad, 1979 Ke-Hut Ha-Shani)
- A Secret Sealed (Magnes- Hebrew University, 1986 Al Sod Hatum)
- Poetry Aptly Explained – Studies and Essays on Medieval Hebrew Poetry (The Magnes Press, Hebrew University, 1993 Ha-Shir Davur Al Ofanav)

=== Books in translation ===
- Selected Poems, (English: Princeton, Quarterly Review of Literature Series, 1992; London, Menard Press, 1972; Philadelphia, Jewish Publication Society, 1981; Berkeley, University of California Press, 1996; San Francisco, North Point, 1989)
- German: An beiden Ufern der Zeit, Tr. Anne Birkenhauer, Straelen, Straelener Manuskripte, 2003, ISBN 3-89107-050-0; Erdichteter Mensch, Tr. Tuvia Ruebner, Frankfurt am Main, Suhrkamp, Juedischer Verlag 1993, ISBN 978-3-633-54083-9
- Spanish: (Granada, Univ. de Granada, 1994)
- The Modern Hebrew Poem Itself (2003), ISBN 0-8143-2485-1
- Variable Directions, Tr. Stephen Mitchell (San Francisco: Northpoint, 1989)
- Poems, Tr. Stephen Mitchell (Oxford: Carcanet Press, 1972)

== See also ==
- Israeli literature
