= Gmina Bełżec =

District of Lublin Voivodeship, Poland

Gmina Bełżec Bełżec Commune
- Gmina
- Flag Coat of arms
- Interactive map of Gmina Bełżec
- Coordinates (Bełżec): 50°23′N 23°26′E
- Country: Poland
- Voivodeship: Lublin
- County: Tomaszów
- Seat: Bełżec

Area
  - Total: 33.52 km^{2} (12.94 sq mi)

Population (2013)
  - Total: 3,435
  - Density: 102.5/km^{2} (265.4/sq mi)
- Website: http://www.belzec.pl/

Gmina Bełżec is a rural gmina (administrative district) in Tomaszów County, Lublin Voivodeship, in eastern Poland. Its seat is the village of Bełżec, which lies approximately 8 kilometres (5 mi) south of Tomaszów Lubelski and 114 km (71 mi) south-east of the regional capital Lublin.

The gmina covers an area of 33.52 square kilometres (12.9 sq mi), and as of 2006 its total population is 2,999 (3,435 in 2013).

== Villages ==
Gmina Bełżec contains the villages and settlements of Bełżec, Chyże, Smoliska, Szalenik-Kolonia, and Zagóra.

== Neighbouring gminas ==
Gmina Bełżec is bordered by the gminas of Lubycza Królewska, Narol, and Tomaszów Lubelski.
