= Szalenik-Kolonia =

- Village
- Location within Poland
- Coordinates: 50°22′37″N 23°28′03″E
- Country: Poland
- Voivodeship: Lublin
- County: Tomaszów
- Gmina: Bełżec

Population
  - Total: 29

Szalenik-Kolonia [ʂaˈlɛnik kɔˈlɔɲa] is a village in the administrative district of Gmina Bełżec, within Tomaszów County, Lublin Voivodeship, in eastern Poland.
