= Zagóra, Gmina Bełżec =

Zagóra
- Village
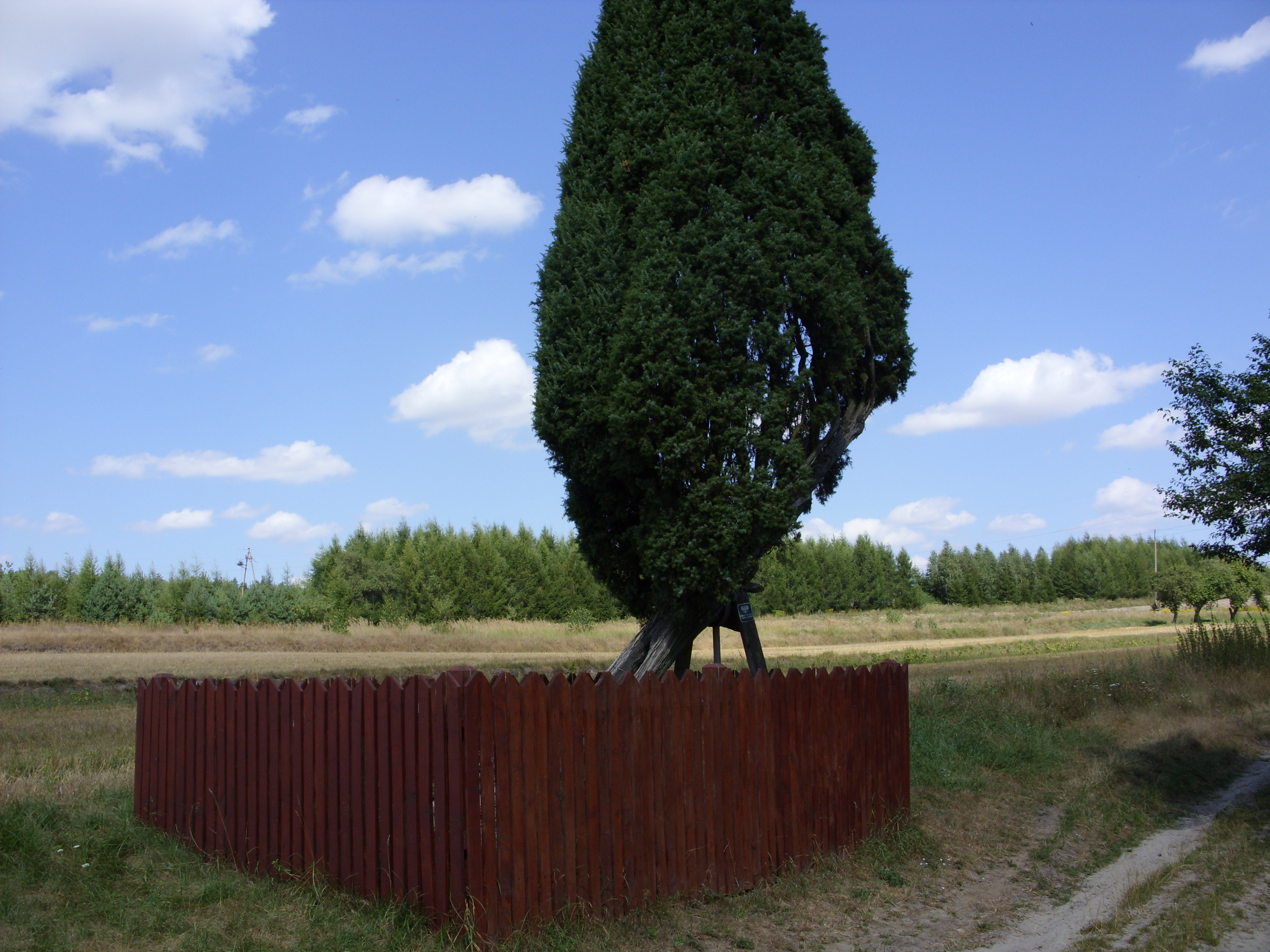
- Over 200-year-old juniper in Zagóra

- Location within Poland
- Coordinates: 50°23′1″N 23°24′56″E
- Country: Poland
- Voivodeship: Lublin
- County: Tomaszów
- Gmina: Bełżec
- Time zone: UTC+1 (CET)
  - Summer (DST): UTC+2 (CEST)
- Vehicle registration: LTM

Zagóra [zaˈɡura] is a part of the village of Bełżec in the administrative district of Gmina Bełżec, within Tomaszów County, Lublin Voivodeship, in eastern Poland.

In Zagóra, there is a unique over 200-year-old juniper tree, a notable local natural monument.
