= Smoliska =

- Village
- Location within Poland
- Coordinates: 50°22′25″N 23°26′41″E
- Country: Poland
- Voivodeship: Lublin
- County: Tomaszów
- Gmina: Bełżec

Smoliska [smɔˈliska] is a village in the administrative district of Gmina Bełżec, within Tomaszów County, Lublin Voivodeship, in eastern Poland.
