= Chyże, Lublin Voivodeship =

Chyże
- Village
- Location within Poland
- Coordinates: 50°23′48″N 23°23′20″E
- Country: Poland
- Voivodeship: Lublin
- County: Tomaszów
- Gmina: Bełżec

Population
  - Total: 380

Chyże [ˈxɨʐɛ] is a village in the administrative district of Gmina Bełżec, within Tomaszów County, Lublin Voivodeship, in eastern Poland. The village is located in the historical region Galicia.
