= Robert Kuwałek =

Polish historian

Robert Kuwałek (1966 – 5 June 2014) was a Polish historian, noted for his work on the history of the Jewish community in the Lublin area and on the Holocaust. He worked at the Majdanek State Museum. 2004–2007 he directed the Museum in Belzec, a new branch of Majdanek State Museum.

== Selected books and other publications ==
- Belzec : le premier centre de mise à mort. Paris: Calmann-Lévy, 2013, http://calmann-levy.fr/livres/belzec/
- Lublin. Jerozolima Królestwa Polskiego, with Wiesław Wysok, Lublin: Współpraca i Dialog, 2001, http://www.biblioteka.teatrnn.pl/dlibra/dlibra/docmetadata?id=8793&from=publication
- "The Ghetto in Lublin," translated by Sophie Frankenberg (née Mendelson), http://www.benchmark.co.il/lublin/The%20ghetto%20in%20Lublin-%20robert%20kuwalek-e.pdf

== Bibliography ==
- Obituary at Jewish Heritage Europe, http://www.jewish-heritage-europe.eu/2014/06/08/polish-holocaust-historian-robert-kuwalek-rip/%E2%80%9D
- Kuwałek's biography in Leksykon Lublin, Ośrodek Brama Grodzka-Teatr NN, http://teatrnn.pl/leksykon/node/1714/robert_kuwa%C5%82ek
- Paweł P. Reszka, "Znany lubelski historyk nie żyje," Gazeta Wyborcza Lublin, 7 June 2014, http://lublin.gazeta.pl/lublin/1,48724,16113559,Znany_lubelski_historyk_nie_zyje__Mial_47_lat.html
