= Kazak =

Kazak may refer to:

== Places ==
- Cazac, Haute-Garonne, a commune in France
- Kazak, Bulgaria, a village
- Kazak, Iran, a village in Fars Province
- Kazak Island, Antarctica
- 6110 Kazak, a main-belt asteroid

== Other uses ==
- Kazak (surname)
- Kazak, a fictional dog in the Kurt Vonnegut novel The Sirens of Titan

== See also ==
- Cossack (disambiguation)
- Kazakh (disambiguation), including Qazaq and variants
- Kozak (disambiguation)
- Kozakov (disambiguation)
