= Cazac, Haute-Garonne =

Cazac
- Commune
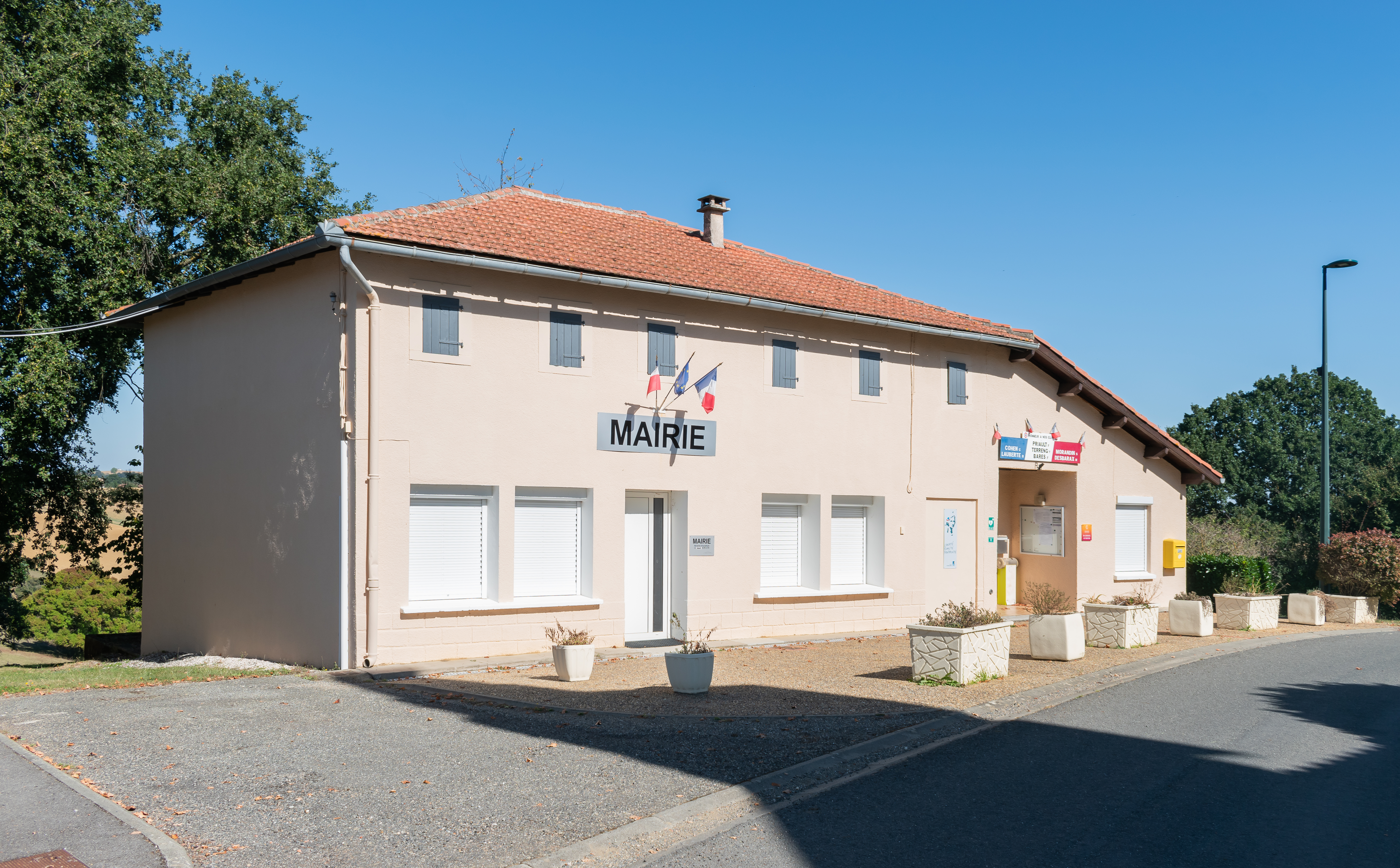
- Town hall of Cazac

- Coat of arms
- Location of Cazac
- Location within France Location within Occitanie
- Coordinates: 43°20′52″N 0°56′42″E
- Country: France
- Region: Occitania
- Department: Haute-Garonne
- Arrondissement: Saint-Gaudens
- Canton: Cazères

Government
  - Mayor (2020–2026): Françoise Priault
- Area^{1}: 6.23 km^{2} (2.41 sq mi)
- Elevation: 357 m (1,171 ft)
- Highest elevation: 356 m (1,168 ft)
- Lowest elevation: 246 m (807 ft)
- Population (2023): 75
  - Density: 12/km^{2} (31/sq mi)
- Time zone: UTC+01:00 (CET)
  - Summer (DST): UTC+02:00 (CEST)
- INSEE/Postal code: 31593 /31230
- ^{1} French Land Register data, which excludes lakes, ponds, glaciers > 1 km^{2} (0.386 sq mi or 247 acres) and river estuaries.

Cazac (French pronunciation: [kazak]; Occitan: Casac) is a commune in the Haute-Garonne department in southwestern France.

Historically and culturally, the commune lies within the Comminges region, corresponding to the former County of Comminges, a district of the province of Gascony located in what are now the departments of Gers, Haute-Garonne, Hautes-Pyrénées, and Ariège. Exposed to a modified oceanic climate, it is drained by the Touch River, the Peyréga stream, and several other small waterways. The commune's natural heritage consists of two protected natural areas of ecological, faunal, and floral interest.

Cazac is a rural commune with a population of 78 in 2022. It is part of the Toulouse metropolitan area. Its inhabitants are called Cazacois or Cazacoises.

== Geography ==
The town of Cazac is located in the department of Haute-Garonne, in the Occitanie region.

It is located 49 km as the crow flies from Toulouse, prefecture of the department, 32 km from Saint-Gaudens sub-prefecture, and 19 km from Cazères, centralizing office of the canton of Cazères on which the commune depends since 2015 for departmental elections. The town is also part of the L'Isle-en-Dodon living area.

The closest communes are: Labastide-Paumès (1.3 km), Riolas (2.2 km), Ambax (2.5 km), Polastron (2.8 km), Sénarens (2.8 km), Goudex (3.4 km), Castelgaillard (3.6 km), Saint-Araille (3.9 km).

Historically and culturally, Cazac is part of the Comminges region, corresponding to the former County of Comminges, a district within the province of Gascony located in what are now the departments of Gers, Haute-Garonne, Hautes-Pyrénées, and Ariège.

The neighboring towns are Ambax, Casties-Labrande, Labastide-Paumès, Riolas, and Sénarens.

== Name ==
The toponymists do not deal with Cazac, a recent commune. Cazac seems to be formed from a male name (the Gallic male names Cadus or Catius, for example) and has the suffix -acum. This is therefore an old large Gallo-Roman property, which was probably owned by Cadus or Catius. Delamarre quotes Catios (adapted in Latin: Catius) and the strain cad(i)-. Cazats, in Bazadais, is probably also Cazac.

== History ==
During the Old Regime, Cazac era of the parròpia of La Bastida de Paumèrs, of the Diocese of Lombez and of the senescaucia of Toulouse. The name of the church, which was annexed by Ambax, and Nòsta Dauna. The official name of La Bastida de Paumèrs was Labastide-Paumès, Cazac and Auban from 1790 to the year II.

The commune Cazac was created in 1958 from part of the commune Labastide-Paumès.

== Heraldry ==
Cazac	Party: 1st azure with a gold house open and pierced sable, 2nd argent with a sunflower proper stalked and leaved vert; all surmounted by a chief gules charged with a cross clechée, voided and pommée of twelve pieces or, cantoned with four silver otelles arranged in saltire.

== Population ==
Historical population
Year	Pop.	±% p.a.
1968	109	—
1975	100	−1.22%
1982	83	−2.63%
1990	84	+0.15%
1999	81	−0.40%
2007	80	−0.16%
2012	86	+1.46%
2017	88	+0.46%
2023	75	−2.63%
Source: INSEE

== See also ==
- Communes of the Haute-Garonne department
