= Cossack (ship) =

Several ships have been named Cossack, for the cossacks:

- Cossack (1812 ship) was launched in Sunderland. In 1814 a United States privateer captured her, the British Royal Navy recaptured her, and a second United States privateer recaptured her and sent her into Salem, Massachusetts.
- Cossack (1812 Whitby ship), of 172 tons (bm), was launched at Whitby in 1812. In 1815 the United States privateer Morgiana captured her. Morgiana divested Cossack of her cargo made a cartel of her to take Morgiana's captives. Cossack, arrived at Palma on 24 February 1815. She had been sailing from Whitehaven to Jamaica.
- Cossack (1813 Liverpool ship) was launched in 1813 in Liverpool. She traded across the Atlantic, first to the Caribbean and then to Northern Canada. She underwent two maritime mishaps, the second of which in December 1823 resulted in her loss.
- Cossack (1813 Quebec ship) was launched in Quebec in 1813 and then moved her registry to the United Kingdom. She made one voyage to the East Indies under a license from the British East India Company. She was damaged in December 1823 and probably condemned.

== See also ==
- HMS Cossack, any one of six vessels of the British Royal Navy
- USS Cossack, either of two vessels of the United States Navy
