= Kazak (surname) =

Kazak is a surname of several possible origins. Notable people with this surname include:

- Ali Kazak (1947–2025), Palestinian diplomat
- Andrei Kazak (born 1980), Belarusian sport shooter
- Anne E. Kazak, American clinical psychologist
- Chetin Kazak (born 1972), Bulgarian politician
- Eddie Kazak (1920–1999), American Major League Baseball player
- Levent Kazak, Turkish screenwriter
- Metin Kazak (born 1972), Bulgarian politician
- Nataliya Kazak (born 1960), Soviet rower
- Yakov Kazak (born 1985), Belarusian retired footballer

== See also ==
- Kasack
- Jēkabs Kazaks (1895–1920), Latvian modernist painter
- Kozak (surname)
- Kazakov
- Kozakov (disambiguation)
- Cossack (disambiguation)
- Kossak
