= List of shipwrecks in December 1823 =

The list of shipwrecks in December 1823 includes all ships sunk, foundered, grounded, or otherwise lost during December 1823.

== 1 December ==
List of shipwrecks: 1 December 1823
Ship	State	Description
Ann	United States	The ship was driven ashore on "Stortemelk", She was on a voyage from New Orleans, Louisiana, to Amsterdam, North Holland, Netherlands.
Baltimore	United States	The ship was wrecked on the Rockaway Shoals. off the coast of New York. She was on a voyage from Falmouth, Cornwall, United Kingdom to New York City.
Betsey	United Kingdom	The brigantine was wrecked at Seaford, Sussex with the loss of a crew member. She was on a voyage from Richibucto, New Brunswick, British North America to Scarborough, Yorkshire.
Delight	United Kingdom	The ship was driven ashore at Workington, Cumberland.
Freundschaft	Bremen	The galiot was abandoned in the Atlantic Ocean. Her twelve crew were rescued by Lancaster (United Kingdom). Freundschaft was on a voyage from the River Gambia to Jersey, Channel Islands.
Goodintent	United Kingdom	The ship foundered off Gromsey, Orkney Islands. She was on a voyage from Wick, Caithness to Drogheda, County Louth.
Hope	United Kingdom	The ship was driven ashore and wrecked at Workington. She was on a voyage from Dublin to Workington.
Maria Frederica	Denmark	The ship sank near Gothenburg, Sweden.

== 2 December ==
List of shipwrecks: 2 December 1823
Ship	State	Description
Belvidera	United States	The ship was driven ashore in Bootle Bay. She was on a voyage from Charleston, South Carolina, to Liverpool, Lancashire, United Kingdom. Belvidera was refloated on 17 December.
Cumberland	United Kingdom	The ship was driven ashore in Bootle Bay. She was refloated on 17 December.
Drover	United Kingdom	The smack was driven ashore and wrecked at Southsea, Hampshire. Her crew were rescued.
Ellison	United Kingdom	The ship was wrecked on the Burbo Bank, in Liverpool Bay. Her crew were rescued. She was on a voyage from Miramichi Bay to Liverpool, Lancashire.
Margaret	United Kingdom	The ship was driven ashore in Rolla Bay, Prince Edward Island, British North America and abandoned by her crew. She was on a voyage from Quebec City, Lower Canada, British North America to London.
Margaret	Hamburg	The ship ran aground at Alvarado, Mexico. She was refloated but found to be leaking and was consequently beached. Margaret then capsized and was subsequently declared a total loss.
Mercury	United States	The ship was driven ashore in Bootle Bay. She was on a voyage from Boston, Massachusetts, to Liverpool. Mercury was refloated the next day.
Queen	United Kingdom	The ship departed from South Shields, County Durham for London. No further trace, presumed foundered in the North Sea with the loss of all hands.
Union	United Kingdom	The ship was lost in the River Mersey. Her crew were rescued by the Liverpool Lifeboat.

== 3 December ==
List of shipwrecks: 3 December 1823
Ship	State	Description
Andrew	United Kingdom	The ship was driven ashore on the Isle of Whithorn, Wigtownshire with the loss of three lives. She was on a voyage from Belfast, County Antrim to Liverpool, Lancashire.
Aurora	United Kingdom	The ship was holed by her anchor and sank at Liverpool. She was subsequently refloated.
Britannia	United Kingdom	The ship sank in Ferry Dock, Hull, Yorkshire. She was later refloated.
Celeritas	Prussia	The galiot was driven ashore and wrecked at Kingstown, County Dublin, United Kingdom.
Creole	France	The ship was lost at Havana, Cuba. Her crew were rescued. She was on a voyage from Havre de Grâce, Seine-Inférieure to Havana.
Eliza Plummer	United Kingdom	The ship was driven ashore in Bootle Bay. She was on a voyage from Liverpool to Jamaica. Eliza Plummer was refloated on 17 December.
Ellison	United Kingdom	The ship struck the Burbo Bank, in Liverpool Bay and was subsequently driven ashore south of Seaforth, Lancashire. She was on a voyage from Miramichi to Liverpool.
Evia	United Kingdom	The ship was wrecked on the Mile House Rocks, in Liverpool Bay. She was on a voyage from Liverpool to Waterford.
Grand Turk	United Kingdom	The ship was driven onto the Hoyle Bank, in Liverpool Bay. She was on a voyage from Liverpool to New York, United States. Grand Turk was refloated on 7 December and put back to Liverpool.
John Reid	United Kingdom	The ship was driven ashore in Bootle Bay. She was on a voyage from Liverpool to Havana, Cuba. John Reid was refloated on 17 December.
Marchioness of Huntley	United Kingdom	The ship was driven onto the Mouse Sand, in the North Sea off the coast off Essex, in early December, She was subsequently driven onto the Maplin Sand by 6 December. She was refloated the next day and taken in to the River Thames.
Margaret	United Kingdom	The ship was driven onto the Maplin Sand. She was refloated on 5 December and taken in to the River Thames.
Margaret	Hamburg	The brig ran aground at Alvarado, Mexico. She was refloated and beached but capsized and was a total loss.
Marquis Cornwallis	United Kingdom	The ship foundered off the Dogger Bank, in the North Sea. Her crew were rescued. She was on a voyage from Sunderland, County Durham to London.
Neptune	United Kingdom	The ship foundered in the Atlantic Ocean off the Isles of Scilly.
Phœbe	United Kingdom	The ship was driven ashore and wrecked between Southend, and Foulness, Essex. She was on a voyage from Quebec City, Lower Canada, British North America to London.
Robert	United Kingdom	The ship departed from South Shields, County Durham for London. No further trace, presumed foundered in the North Sea with the loss of all hands.
Sophie	Kingdom of Hanover	The galiot was wrecked on the Sandwich Flats, Kent, United Kingdom.
Triton	United Kingdom	The ship was driven ashore in Bootle Bay. She was on a voyage from Liverpool to Miramichi, New Brunswick, British North America. Triton was refloated the next day.
True Briton	United Kingdom	The brig was driven ashore at Grimsby, Lincolnshire.
Union	United Kingdom	The ship ran aground on the Burbo Bank, in Liverpool bay and lost her rudder. She consequently came ashore on the Cheshire bank of the River Mersey and was wrecked. Union was on a voyage from Miramichi to Liverpool.
Unity	United Kingdom	The ship foundered in Bootle Bay.

== 4 December ==
List of shipwrecks: 4 December 1823
Ship	State	Description
Agenoria	United States	The ship was driven ashore at Plumb Point, Jamaica.
Ann	United Kingdom	The ship ran aground on the Maplin Sand, in the North Sea off the coast of Essex. She was on a voyage from Saint John, New Brunswick, British North America to London.
Black Snake	United States	The ship sank at Eastport, Maine.
Commerce	United Kingdom	The ship was driven ashore and wrecked at Portgordon, Morayshire. Her crew were rescued. She was on a voyage from Dundalk, County Louth to London.
Corsair	United Kingdom	The ship was driven ashore at Penrose Point, Renfrewshire. She was on a voyage from Saint John, New Brunswick, British North America to Greenock, Renfrewshire. Corsair was later refloated and taken in to Greenock.
Cossack	United Kingdom	The ship was driven ashore and wrecked at Newgale, Pembrokeshire. Her crew were rescued. She was on a voyage from Miramichi Bay to Dublin.
Duxbury	United States	The ship was driven ashore at Ramsgate, Kent, United Kingdom. She was on a voyage from Baltimore, Maryland, to Rotterdam, South Holland, Netherlands. Duxbury was refloated on 6 December and taken in to Ramsgate.
Elizabeth	United Kingdom	The ship was driven ashore in the Eider. She was on a voyage from Hamburg to Liverpool, Lancashire.
Emanuel	Netherlands	The ship was wrecked on the Balg Sandbank, in the North Sea off Texel, North Holland. She was on a voyage from Medemblik, North Holland to Tönningen, Duchy of Holstein.
Esperance	Hamburg	The ship foundered at the mouth of the Elbe with the loss of six of the twelve people on board. She was on a voyage from Málaga, Spain to Hamburg.
Fair Play; Mary Bell	United States	The schooners were driven into each other and sank at Eastport with the loss of two lives.
Gratitude	United Kingdom	The ship was driven ashore near "Wittenbergen". She was refloated on 9 December.
Harmony	United Kingdom	The ship ran aground on the Kettlebottom Sand, in the North Sea and was severely damaged. She was on a voyage from Quebec City, Lower Canada, British North America to Hull, Yorkshire.
Hazard	France	The ship was wrecked at Sables d'Olonne, Vendée. She was on a voyage from Bergen, Norway to Bordeaux, Gironde.
Helena	United Kingdom	The ship was driven ashore on Texel, North Holland. She was on a voyage from Amsterdam to Hull.
Hercules	United Kingdom	The ship was driven ashore east of Port Seton, Lothian. She was on a voyage from Arbroath, Forfarshire to Glasgow, Renfrewshire. Hercules was later refloated and taken in to Aberlady Bay.
John & Frederick	Hamburg	The ship was driven ashore at Hamburg. She was on a voyage from Hamburg to Lisbon. John & Frederick was later refloated.
John and Mary	United Kingdom	The ship was wrecked on Anholt, Denmark. All on board were rescued. She was on a voyage from Saint Petersburg, Russia to London.
Josephine	Hamburg	The ship was driven ashore at Hamburg. She was on a voyage from Hamburg to Saint Thomas, U.S. Virgin Islands, Virgin Islands.
Laurel	(United Kingdom of Great Britain and Ireland) Jersey	The ship departed from Rio de Janeiro for Jersey. No further trace, presumed foundered with the loss of all hands.
Lord Middleton	United Kingdom	The ship was driven ashore and wrecked at Holyhead, Anglesey. All fourteen people on board were rescued. She was on a voyage from St. Andrew, New Brunswick, British North America to Liverpool, Lancashire.
Marie	France	The ship was wrecked south of Tybee Island, Georgia, United States with the loss of all but one of her crew. She was on a voyage from Bordeaux, Gironde to Savannah, Georgia.
Margaret	United Kingdom	The ship ran aground on the Maplin Sands. She was on a voyage from Quebec City, Lower Canada, British North America to London.
Mary	United States	The brig was driven ashore at the West Quoddy Head Lighthouse, Lubec, Maine.
Matchless	United Kingdom	The hoy sank alongside HMS Canada (Royal Navy) at Sheerness, Kent with the loss of a crew member.
Minerva	Hamburg	The ship was wrecked on the Filgen Plaat, in the Eider. She was on a voyage from Bahia, Brazil to Hamburg.
Monarch	United Kingdom	The ship was driven ashore and wrecked south of Ballantrae, Ayrshire. She was on a voyage from Greenock, Renfrewshire to Savannah, Georgia, United States.
Neptune	United Kingdom	The ship was wrecked near Lossiemouth, Morayshire.
Sophie	Portugal	The ship was wrecked on the Sandwich Flats, Kent. She was on a voyage from London to Faro, Portugal.
Sophia Cornelia	Hamburg	The ship was wrecked on the Nordergrund, in the North Sea off Cuxhaven with the loss of all hands. She was on a voyage from Havana, Cuba to Hamburg.
Swallow	United States	The ship sank at Eastport.
Tigris	United Kingdom	The ship foundered in the North Sea off Tynemouth, Northumberland with the loss of two of her crew. She was on a voyage from London to South Shields, County Durham.
Verroisseling	Netherlands	The ship was driven ashore and wrecked on Texel. She was on a voyage from Málaga, Spain to Amsterdam.
Virginia Packet	United States	The ship was driven ashore on the Sandwich Flats. She was on a voyage from Virginia to London. Virginia Packet was refloated on 5 December and taken in to Ramsgate, Kent for repairs.
William	United Kingdom	The ship foundered in the North Sea off "Huntley Point". Her crew were rescued. She was on a voyage from South Shields to London.
William & Henry	United States	The full-rigged ship was wrecked on the Nordergrund. She was on a voyage from New Orleans, Louisiana, to Hamburg.

== 5 December ==
List of shipwrecks: 5 December 1823
Ship	State	Description
Erin	United Kingdom	The ship was driven ashore at Liverpool, Lancashire. She was on a voyage from Liverpool to Dublin.
Vine	United Kingdom	The ship was wrecked on the Haisborough Sands, in the North Sea off the coast of Norfolk. Her crew were rescued. She was on a voyage from Sunderland, County Durham to Rotterdam, South Holland, Netherlands.
Waveney	United Kingdom	The ship was driven ashore at Lymington, Hampshire. She was on a voyage from Yarmouth, Isle of Wight to Liverpool.

== 6 December ==
List of shipwrecks: 6 December 1823
Ship	State	Description
Ligera Roca	Spain	The schooner struck a reef off "Montany Point" and foundered. She was on a voyage from Havana, Cuba to New York, United States.
Streamlet	United Kingdom	The ship was wrecked on the Shipwash Sand, in the North Sea off the coast of Essex. Her crew were rescued.

== 7 December ==
List of shipwrecks: 7 December 1823
Ship	State	Description
William	United Kingdom	The ship foundered in the North Sea off Hartley, Northumberland. Seven crew were rescued by Pomoma (United Kingdom). William was on a voyage from South Shields, County Durham to London.

== 8 December ==
List of shipwrecks: 8 December 1823
Ship	State	Description
Christian and Elixabeth	Sweden	The ship was abandoned off Cape Wrath, Caithness, United Kingdom. She came ashore at Strathy Head, Caithness on 11 December and was wrecked.
Jean	United Kingdom	The brig was abandoned in the North Sea 60 nautical miles (110 km) off Domesnes, Norway. Her crew were rescued by Probity (United Kingdom). She was on a voyage from Sunderland, County Durham to Aberdeen.

== 9 December ==
List of shipwrecks: 9 December 1823
Ship	State	Description
Adeline	United States	The ship was wrecked at Cape Henlopen, Delaware. She was on a voyage from Cap-Haïtien, Haiti to Philadelphia, Pennsylvania.
Aspasia	United States	The ship was driven ashore at the mouth of the Oost, Kingdom of Hanover.
Charlotte	Russia	The ship struck a rock and foundered off Hindoen, Norway. Her crew survived, She was on a voyage from Arkhangelsk to Liverpool, Lancashire, United Kingdom.
Elizabeth	United Kingdom	The ship was wrecked in the St. Lawrence River. She was on a voyage from Quebec City, Lower Canada, British North America to London.
Henrietta	United States	The ship was driven ashore and wrecked at the mouth of the Oost.
Shamrock	United Kingdom	The ship was driven ashore and severely damaged near Ramsey, Isle of Man. She was on a voyage from Liverpool to Belfast, County Antrim.
Spring	United Kingdom	The ship was wrecked on Bovenbergen, Jutland with the loss of all hands.

== 10 December ==
List of shipwrecks: 10 December 1823
Ship	State	Description
Gute Carolina	Prussia	The ship was driven ashore at Ventava, Courland Governorate She was on a voyage from Leith, Lothian, United Kingdom to Ventava.
Frau Anna Margaretha	Prussia	The ship was driven ashore at Virga, Russia. She was on a voyage from Riga, Russia to Newry, County Down, United Kingdom.
Laurentia	Denmark	The ship was wrecked on the coast of Jutland with the loss of all but one of her crew. She was on a voyage from Guernsey, Channel Islands to Copenhagen.
London Packet	United Kingdom	The ship was wrecked on Neuwerk, Kingdom of Hanover. Her crew were rescued. She was on a voyage from Newcastle-upon-Tyne, Northumberland to Hamburg.
Vittoria	(United Kingdom of Great Britain and Ireland) Jamaica	The ship was beached on Crooked Island, Bahamas, where she was wrecked. She was on a voyage from Jamaica to Halifax, Nova Scotia, British North America.

== 11 December ==
List of shipwrecks: 11 December 1823
Ship	State	Description
Hope	United Kingdom	The ship was driven ashore in Fresh Water Bay, Pembrokeshire with the loss of her captain. She was on a voyage from Barnstaple, Devon to Pembroke.
Martha	United Kingdom	The ship was driven ashore off Ystad, Sweden. Her crew were rescued. She was later refloated and taken in to Ystad.
Orion	United Kingdom	The ship was driven ashore and wrecked on Baltrum, Kingdom of Hanover. Her crew were rescued. She was on a voyage from Riga, Russia to London.
Osbaldeston	United Kingdom	The ship foundered in the North Sea off South Shields, County Durham.
Providentia	Danzig	The ship was wrecked on "Neuhuren". Her crew were rescued. She was on a voyage from Swinemünde, Prussia to Danzig.

== 12 December ==
List of shipwrecks: 12 December 1823
Ship	State	Description
Ann & Jane	United Kingdom	The brig was driven ashore at Scarborough, Yorkshire. She was on a voyage from Deal, Kent to South Shields, County Durham. Ann & Jane was refloated on 16 December and taken in to Scarborough.
Annes	United Kingdom	The ship was lost off Rathlin Island, County Antrim with the loss of two lives. She was on a voyage from Sligo to Liverpool, Lancashire.
Hoppet	(Russian Empire) Grand Duchy of Finland	The ship was driven ashore in Widewall Bay. She was on a voyage from Uleåborg (Oulu) to Liverpool, Lancashire, United Kingdom.
Isabella	United Kingdom	The ship was driven ashore in Loch Indaal.
Jessie	United Kingdom	The brig was wrecked off Blackpool, Lancashire with the loss of two of the fifteen people on board. She was on a voyage from Quebec City, Lower Canada, British North America to Liverpool, Lancashire.
Nancy	United Kingdom	The sloop was driven ashore and wrecked near the "Holman", Denmark.
Union	United States	The ship was wrecked on Anegada. She was on a voyage from Barbados to Bath, Maine.
Wackzamkeit	Bremen	The ship was wrecked on the Tegeler Sand, in the North Sea. Her crew were rescued. She was on a voyage from Baltimore, Maryland, United States to Bremen.

== 13 December ==
List of shipwrecks: 13 December 1823
Ship	State	Description
Fortuna	(United Kingdom of Great Britain and Ireland) Gibraltar	The ship was wrecked at Bilbao, Spain.
Jessie	United Kingdom	The brig was driven ashore and wrecked at Blackpool, Lancashire.
Mercy	United Kingdom	The ship foundered in the North Sea 4 leagues (12 nautical miles (22 km)) off the Galloper Sandbank. Her crew were rescued by Naiad (Prussia). She was on a voyage from Newcastle upon Tyne, Northumberland to the Charente.
Sceptre	United Kingdom	The ship was holed by her anchor and sank at Pernambuco, Brazil. She was subsequently patched and refloated, and was beached for repairs on 19 January 1824.

== 14 December ==
List of shipwrecks: 14 December 1823
Ship	State	Description
Britannia	United Kingdom	The ship was wrecked on Black Hall Head. Her crew were rescued, She was on a voyage from London to Limerick.
Express	United Kingdom	The transport ship was driven against the quayside at Fishguard, Pembrokeshire and sank.
Maria Henrietta	Kingdom of Hanover	The ship was driven ashore and wrecked on Terschelling, Friesland, Netherlands. Her crew were rescued. She was on a voyage from St. Ubes, Portugal to Emden.
William	United Kingdom	The schooner was sighted in the North Sea 40 nautical miles (74 km) off The Staples. No further trace, presumed foundered with the loss of all hands. She was on a voyage from Sunderland, County Durham to Aberdeen
William Leece	United Kingdom	The ship departed from Newfoundland, British North America for Bristol, Gloucestershire. No further trace, presumed foundered with the loss of all hands.

== 15 December ==
List of shipwrecks: 15 December 1823
Ship	State	Description
Angelica	United States	The ship was wrecked on Buck Island, Virgin Islands. Her crew were rescued.

== 16 December ==
List of shipwrecks: 16 December 1823
Ship	State	Description
Admiral Fabie	(United Kingdom of Great Britain and Ireland) Antigua	The brig capsized in a squall in the Atlantic Ocean. Her crew were rescued by Milford (United Kingdom). Admiral Fabie was on a voyage from Wilmington, North Carolina, United States to Antigua.
Andersons	United Kingdom	The ship was wrecked on the south coast of Bornholm, Denmark. Her crew were rescued. She was on a voyage from Saint Petersburg, Russia to Whitby, Yorkshire.
Isabella	Kingdom of Hanover	The ship was driven ashore crewless and wrecked on Juist.
William	United Kingdom	The ship was abandoned in the North Sea. Her crew were rescued by Kiero (flag unknown). She was on a voyage from Rostock to Madeira, Portugal.

== 17 December ==
List of shipwrecks: 17 December 1823
Ship	State	Description
Brothers	United Kingdom	The ship was severely damaged when HMS Queen Charlotte (Royal Navy) was driven into her at Portsmouth, Hampshire.
Ceres	United Kingdom	The ship was driven ashore between Frederikshavn and Skagen, Denmark. Her crew were rescued. She was on a voyage from Saint Petersburg, Russia to Dundee, Forfarshire.
Cobham	United Kingdom	The ship was driven ashore at Southsea, Hampshire. She was on a voyage from London to São Miguel Island, Azores. Cobham was later refloated and taken in to Portsmouth.
Cygnet	United Kingdom	The brig was driven ashore in Deadman's Bay and damaged. She was refloated and beached on 20 December.
Dispatch	United Kingdom	The ship was driven ashore and wrecked at Littlehampton, Sussex. She was on a voyage from Wisbech, Cambridgeshire to Southampton, Hampshire.
Eliza	United Kingdom	The ship was driven onto Hamilton's Bank, in The Solent and sank. Her crew were rescued. She was on a voyage from Bristol, Gloucestershire to Portsmouth and Chichester, Sussex.
Endeavour	United Kingdom	The ship was driven ashore at Great Yarmouth, Norfolk. She was on a voyage from Wisbech, Cambridgeshire to London. Endeavour was later refloated.
Harmony	United Kingdom	The ship was driven ashore and sank at Great Yarmouth. Her crew were rescued.
Margaret	United Kingdom	The ship was driven ashore and wrecked on Swinna, Orkney Islands with the loss of four lives.

== 18 December ==
List of shipwrecks: 18 December 1823
Ship	State	Description
Alexis	Russia	The ship was driven ashore at Helsingør, Denmark. She was on a voyage from Saint Petersburg to London, United Kingdom. Alexis was refloated in early January and towed to Copenhagen.
Alliance	France	The ship was driven ashore and wrecked at Helsingør. She was on a voyage from Gävle, Sweden to Marseille, Bouches-du-Rhône.
Courier	France	The ship was wrecked in Chale Bay, She was on a voyage from "Croisie" to Rouen, Seine-Inférieure.
Henrietta Johanna	Sweden	The ship was driven ashore near Kronborg, Denmark. She was on a voyage from Rio de Janeiro, Brazil to Stockholm. She was declared a total loss.
Hersteller	Prussia	The ship was driven ashore at Helsingør. She was on a voyage from Memel to Livorno, Grand Duchy of Tuscany. Hersteller had been refloated by mid-January.
Hoppet	Sweden	The ship was driven ashore near Kronborg. She was on a voyage from Stockholm to Plymouth, Devon, United Kingdom. Hoppet had been refloated by mid-January and towed in to Copenhagen.
Johan	Stettin	The ship was driven ashore and wrecked at Kronborg. She was on a voyage from Memel to London, United Kingdom.
Latona	United Kingdom	The ship was driven ashore at Helsingør. She was on a voyage from Riga, Russia to Liverpool, Lancashire. Latona had been refloated by mid-January and taken in to Copenhagen.
Opreisingen	Norway	The ship sank near "Longsound".
Sarah	United Kingdom	The ship was driven ashore and damaged at Kronborg. She was on a voyage from Danzig to London. Sarah was refloated in early January 1824 and put into Copenhagen.
Susannah	United Kingdom	The ship was driven ashore and wrecked at Kronborg. She was on a voyage from Saint Petersburg, Russia to Hull, Yorkshire.
Vrau Christine	United Kingdom	The ship was lost 1 nautical mile (1.9 km) east of Kragerø.
Zwey Freunde	Norway	The ship was driven ashore near Fredriksvern.

== 19 December ==
List of shipwrecks: 19 December 1823
Ship	State	Description
Cossack	United Kingdom	The ship was driven ashore on the coast of New York, United States in late December. She was on a voyage from Bristol, Gloucestershire to New York City. Cossack had been refloated and towed in to New York City by 29 December.
Fortuna	Netherlands	The ship was driven ashore and wrecked on the Isle of Portland, Dorset, United Kingdom. Her crew were rescued. She was on a voyage from Porto, Portugal to Amsterdam, North Holland.
Palmer	United Kingdom	The ship foundered off Wexford with the loss of all hands.
Twee Gebroders	Bremen	The ship was driven ashore near Scharhörn. She was on a voyage from Hull, Yorkshire to Bremen. Twee Gebroders was refloated on 18 December and taken in to Cuxhaven.
Vanguard	United Kingdom	The ship was driven ashore and wrecked at Bridlington, Yorkshire. Her crew were rescued. She was on a voyage from Sunderland, County Durham to Berwick-upon-Tweed, Northumberland.

== 20 December ==
List of shipwrecks: 20 December 1823
Ship	State	Description
Ann	United Kingdom	The ship was wrecked near Warkworth, Northumberland. Her crew were rescued. She was on a voyage from Antwerp, Netherlands to Dundee, Forfarshire.
HMS Arab	Royal Navy	The Cruizer-class brig-sloop was wrecked in Broadhaven Bay with the loss of all 121 crew sometime between 15 and 24 December.
Beehive	United Kingdom	The ship was driven ashore and wrecked at Shoreham-by-Sea, Sussex. Her crew were rescued.
Dale	United Kingdom	The ship was driven ashore and wrecked at Holyhead, Anglesey. Her crew were rescued. She was on a voyage from Saint John, New Brunswick, British North America to the Clyde.
Endeavour	United Kingdom	The sloop was wrecked on the Wainfleet Fleets, in The Wash off the coast of Lincolnshire.
Express	United Kingdom	The ship departed from Hamburg for Hull. No further trace, presumed foundered in the North Sea with the loss of all hands.
Favourite	United Kingdom	The pilot boat foundered off the Isle of Wight.
Flora	United Kingdom	The ship was driven ashore and wrecked at Ballywalter, County Down.
Harriet	United Kingdom	The smack was lost on the Oaze, in the Thames Estuary with the loss of all hands.
Havanna	United Kingdom	The ship was lost on the Maplin Sand, in the North Sea off the coast of Essex. Her crew were rescued. She was on a voyage from South Shields, County Durham to London.
Leeds	United Kingdom	The ship was driven ashore at Bridlington, Yorkshire. She was on a voyage from Newburgh, Fife to Hull, Yorkshire.
Palmyra	United Kingdom	The ship was driven ashore and wrecked at Dover, Kent. Her crew were rescued. She was on a voyage from Saint-Domingue to London.
Valiant	United Kingdom	The ship was driven ashore and wrecked at Bridlington. Her crew were rescued.
Vanguard	United Kingdom	The ship was driven ashore and wrecked at Bridlington.

== 21 December ==
List of shipwrecks: 21 December 1823
Ship	State	Description
Cato	United Kingdom	The ship was driven against the pier and sank at Ramsgate, Kent.
Harmony	United Kingdom	The ship was driven ashore and wrecked in Bigbury Bay. Her crew were rescued.
Prosperity	United Kingdom	The ship sprang a leak in the Irish Sea off Douglas, Isle of Man and was beached at Surley Head, where she broke her back. She was on a voyage from Whitehaven, Cumberland to Dublin.

== 22 December ==
List of shipwrecks: 22 December 1823
Ship	State	Description
Adelheid	Netherlands	The ship ran aground on the West Plaat, in the North Sea and subsequently came ashore at Oostvoorne, South Holland where she was wrecked. Her crew were rescued. Adelheid was on a voyage from Bordeaux, Gironde, France to Rotterdam, South Holland.
Erwartung	Prussia	The ship was lost near Hørning, Denmark. All on board were rescued. She was on a voyage from Pillau to Leith, Lothian, United Kingdom.
Jessie	United Kingdom	The ship was wrecked on St. Paul Island, Nova Scotia, British North America. All 22 people on board survived the wreck but subsequently perished. She was on a voyage from Prince Edward Island, British North America to Liverpool, Lancashire.
Moseley; Porto Bello	United Kingdom	The ships were in collision in the North Sea off Lowestoft, Suffolk. Both vessels foundered on the Corton Sand. Their crews were rescued.
True Blue	United Kingdom	The ship departed from Stromness, Orkney Islands for Sligo. No further trace, presumed foundered with the loss of all hands.

== 23 December ==
List of shipwrecks: 23 December 1823
Ship	State	Description
Eliza	United Kingdom	The ship was wrecked on the Horn Reef, off the coast of Jutland. She was on a voyage from Danzig to an English port.
Elizabeth	United Kingdom	The ship was sunk by ice in the Restigouche River.
Regent	United Kingdom	The brig sank at Margate, Kent in a gale.

== 24 December ==
List of shipwrecks: 24 December 1823
Ship	State	Description
Friends	United Kingdom	The ship ran aground on the Holm Sand, in the Thames Estuary. She was on a voyage from Wyborg, Sweden to Hull, Yorkshire. Friends was refloated on 31 December and taken in to Hull.
Nelson	(United Kingdom of Great Britain and Ireland) Guernsey	The ship was driven ashore near Grado, Austrian Empire. She was on a voyage from Rio de Janeiro, Brazil to Trieste.
New Triton	United Kingdom	The ship ran aground off Whitehaven, Cumberland, where she was wrecked on 29 December. New Triton was on a voyage from Whitehaven to Ballyshannon, County Donegal.
Plymouth Packet	United Kingdom	The ship was driven ashore and damaged at St. Mary's, Isles of Scilly. She was on a voyage from Bordeaux, Gironde, France to Liverpool, Lancashire. Plymouth Packet was later refloated.

== 25 December ==
List of shipwrecks: 25 December 1823
Ship	State	Description
Jessie	United Kingdom	The brig departed from Prince Edward Island, British North America for Liverpool, Lancashire. No further trace, presumed foundered in the Atlantic Ocean with the loss of all hands.
Sampson	United Kingdom	The brig departed from Prince Edward Island for Liverpool. No further trace, presumed foundered in the Atlantic Ocean with the loss of all hands.

== 26 December ==
List of shipwrecks: 26 December 1823
Ship	State	Description
Niger	United Kingdom	The ship was wrecked on the Haisborough Sands, in the North Sea off the coast of Norfolk with the loss of all but four of her crew. She was on a voyage from Newcastle upon Tyne, Northumberland to Grenada.

== 27 December ==
List of shipwrecks: 27 December 1823
Ship	State	Description
Elizabeth	United Kingdom	The ship was wrecked near Wick, Caithness. Her crew were rescued.
John o'Groat	United Kingdom	The smack was driven ashore and wrecked at Peterhead, Aberdeenshire.

== 29 December ==
List of shipwrecks: 29 December 1823
Ship	State	Description
Aid	United Kingdom	The ship was driven ashore near Ravenglass, Cumberland. She was on a voyage from Liverpool, Lancashire to Maryport, Cumberland. Aid was refloated in early January 1824 and taken in to Maryport.
Alm	United Kingdom	The ship was driven ashore and wrecked on the Helmsley Rocks, near Warkworth, Northumberland. Her crew were rescued. She was on a voyage from Antwerp, United Kingdom of the Netherlands to Dundee, Forfarshire.
Eleanor	United Kingdom	The ship was driven ashore and capsized at Labasheeda, County Clare. She was on a voyage from Limerick to Liverpool, Lancashire.
Lyme	United Kingdom	The ship departed from Cork for Plymouth, Devon. No further trace, presumed foundered with the loss of all hands.

== 30 December ==
List of shipwrecks: 30 December 1823
Ship	State	Description
Aim	United Kingdom	The ship was driven onto the Hauxley Rocks, Northumberland. She was on a voyage from Antwerp, Netherlands to Dundee, Forfarshire. Aim was refloated on 12 January 1824 and taken in to Blyth, Northumberland.
Haford	United Kingdom	The ship was driven ashore near the "Rock Pearch". She was on a voyage from Liverpool, Lancashire to Swansea, Glamorgan.

== 31 December ==
List of shipwrecks: 31 December 1823
Ship	State	Description
Lord Collingwood	United Kingdom	The ship was lost on the coast of Ceará, Brazil. She was on a voyage from Maranhão, Brazil to London
Union	United Kingdom	The ship was lost on Long Island, New York, United States. Her crew were rescued. She was on a voyage from Liverpool, Lancashire to New York City.

== Unknown date ==
List of shipwrecks: Unknown date in December 1823
Ship	State	Description
Anderson	United Kingdom	The ship was wrecked on Bornholm, Denmark.
Ann	United Kingdom	The sloop struck a rock off Newbiggin Point, Northumberland, capsized and sank in mid-December. Her crew were rescued by Traveller (United Kingdom).
Annes	United Kingdom	The ship was wrecked on Rathlin Island, County Donegal.
Billow	United Kingdom	The ship departed from Newfoundland in late December. No further trace, presumed foundered with the loss of all hands.
Black Jack	(United Kingdom of Great Britain and Ireland) New South Wales	The schooner was wrecked at Port Macquarie.
Brothers	United Kingdom	The ship was driven ashore and damaged near Ystad, Sweden before 13 December. Her crew were rescued. She was on a voyage from Riga, Russia to Dundee, Forfarshire.
Ceres	United Kingdom	The ship was driven ashore near "Aalbeck". She was on a voyage from Riga to Dundee. Ceres was refloated on 15 September 1824. She was taken in to Gothenburg, Sweden for repairs.
Ceres	Hamburg	The ship foundered off the mouth of the Elbe with the loss of all hands. She was on a voyage from Rio de Janeiro, Brazil to Hamburg.
Ceres	United Kingdom	The ship was lost near Charlottetown, Prince Edward Island, British North America. She was on a voyage from Prince Edward Island to a British port.
Chieftain	United Kingdom	The ship doundered in the Atlantic Ocean off the Isles of Scilly in mid-December.
Concordia	Netherlands	The ship was driven ashore on Juist, Kingdom of Hanover. She was on a voyage from Norway to Rotterdam, South Holland.
Duchess of Berry	United Kingdom	The steamship was sunk at Havre de Grâce, Seine-Inférieure, France by a West Indiaman.
Eliza	United Kingdom	The ship was wrecked on the Horn Reef, off the coast of Jutland.
Elizabeth	United Kingdom	The ship was wrecked in the Saint Lawrence River. She was on a voyage from Quebec City, Lower Canada, British North America to London.
Elizabeth	United Kingdom	The ship was driven ashore in the Eider. She was reported to be a wreck by late February 1824.
Fidelita	Portugal	The ship was abandoned before 15 December. She was on a voyage from Lisbon to Gibraltar.
Frances	United Kingdom	The ship was driven ashore at Lindisfarne, Northumberland. She was on a voyage from Great Yarmouth, Norfolk to Alloa, Clackmannanshire.
Henriette Johanne	Sweden	The ship was driven ashore at Helsingør. She was on a voyage from Rio de Janeiro' Brazil to Stockholm. Henriette Johanne was refloated in early January and taken in to Helsingør.
Hoffnung	Netherlands	The ship was wrecked on the Vlaak Sandbank, in the North Sea. She was on a voyage from Amsterdam, North Holland to Hull, Yorkshire, United Kingdom.
Hyperion	United Kingdom	The ship was driven ashore and wrecked near Ystad before 13 December. Her crew were rescued. She was on a voyage from Riga, Russia to London.
Idogheden	Sweden	The ship was driven ashore at Helsingør. She was on a voyage from Gävle to Gibraltar. Idogheden was refloated in early January and taken in to Landskrona.
Isabella	Netherlands	The ship was driven ashore and wrecked on Juist.
Jessie	United Kingdom	The brig was wrecked on St. Paul Island, Nova Scotia, British North America. All 22 passengers and crew survived, but died of exposure before they could be rescued. Jessie was on a voyage from Quebec City, Lower Canada, British North America to London.
Laurentius	Denmark	The ship foundered in the North Sea. Her crew were rescued by Tobago (United Kingdom). She was on a voyage from Copenhagen to Jersey, Channel Islands.
Leeds	United Kingdom	The ship was driven ashore near Bridlington, East Riding of Yorkshire. She was on a voyage from Newburgh, Fife to Hull. Leeds was refloated on 30 December.
London	United Kingdom	The ship was lost on the coast of Newfoundland, British North America with the loss of six of her crew.
Marianne	France	The ship was driven ashore near Faro, Portugal. She was on a voyage from Marseille, Bouches-du-Rhône to Havre de Grâce, Seine-Inférieure.
Marie	France	The ship was wrecked south of Tybee, Georgia, United States in early December with the loss of all but one of her crew. She was on a voyage from Bordeaux, Gironde to Savannah, Georgia.
Nancy	United Kingdom	The ship was driven ashore between Fredrikshavn and Skagen, Denmark in a capsized state before 27 December.
Nelson	(United Kingdom of Great Britain and Ireland) Guernsey	The ship was driven ashore at Grado, Austrian Empire before 26 December and was abandoned by her crew. She was on a voyage from Rio de Janeiro, Brazil to Trieste, Austrian Empire.
Phoebe	United Kingdom	The ship was driven ashore between Southend and Foulness Island, Essex before 7 December.
Ranger	United Kingdom	The ship was lost 20 nautical miles (37 km) off St. John's, Newfoundland, British North America. She was on a voyage from Liverpool, Lancashire to St. John's.
Richard	United Kingdom	The ship foundered in the Irish Sea. She was on a voyage from Belfast, County Antrim to Liverpool.
Sarah	United Kingdom	The ship was driven ashore at Helsingør. She was on a voyage from Danzig to London. Sarah was refloated in early January and taken in to Copenhagen.
Shamrock	United Kingdom	The ship was driven ashore in Ramsey Bay, Isle of Man.
Sisters	United Kingdom	The brig was wrecked off the South coast of Antigua.
Trent	United Kingdom	The ship was wrecked in the Atlantic Ocean. Four survivors were rescued by Margaret Ann (United Kingdom).
Venus	United Kingdom	The ship was driven ashore at Falmouth, Cornwall. She was on a voyage from Penzance, Cornwall to Livorno, Grand Duchy of Tuscany. Venus was refloated on 4 December and taken in to Falmouth.
