= Kazakh =

Kazakh or variants may refer to:

== Related to Kazakhstan ==
- of or from Kazakhstan
- Kazakhs, an ethnic group
- Kazakh language

== Places ==
- Qazax, Azerbaijan
  - Qazax District
  - Kazakh uezd, administrative district of Elisavetpol Governorate during Russian rule in Azerbaijan
- Gezak, Fars, Iran

== Other uses ==
- Qazaq (newspaper), a former Kazakh-language weekly newspaper

== See also ==
- Cossack (disambiguation)
- Kazaky, Ukrainian pop band
- Kazak (disambiguation)
