= Kasack =

German surname of Russian origin

Kasack is a German surname, a rendering of the Russian surname Казак, which literally means "cossack". Notable people with the surname include:

- Hermann Kasack
- Wolfgang Kasack

== See also ==
- Kazak (surname)
- Kozak (surname)
- Kossak
