= Kozakov =

Kozakov (feminine: Kozakova) is a Russian and Ukrainian surname. Notable people with the surname include:

- Alexander Kazakov, also spelled Kozakov (1889–1919), Russian fighter pilot
- Mikhail Kozakov (1934–2011), Russian-Israeli film and theatre director and actor
- Mikhail Kozakov (chess player) (born 1972), Ukrainian chess player
- Olga Kozakova (born 1951), Ukrainian volleyball player
- Slata Roschal, also known as Slata Kozakova (born 1992), German-Russian writer and literary scholar

== See also ==
- Ještěd–Kozákov Ridge
- Kazakov, a surname
- Kozak (disambiguation)
- Kozak (surname)
- Kazak (disambiguation)
