= Kazakov =

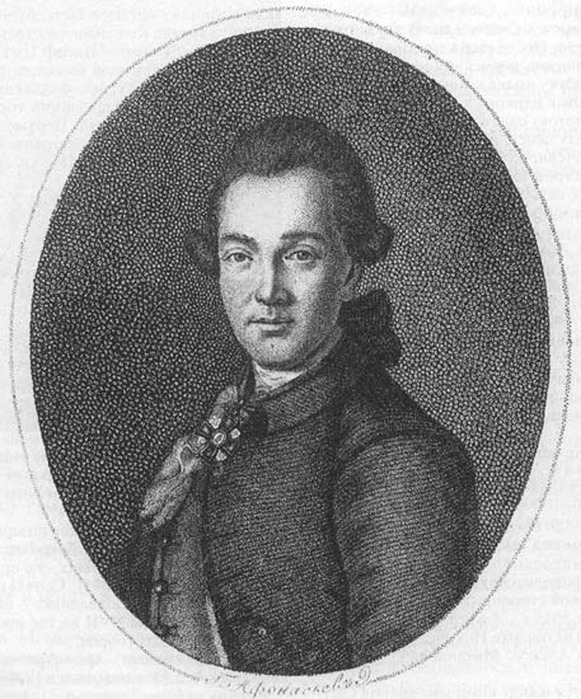
Kazakov

Kazakov (Russian: Казаков), or Kazakova (feminine; Russian: Казакова), is a Russian surname meaning lit. "of cossack" (kozak, Russian: казак). Notable people with the surname include:

- Alexander Kazakov (1889–1919), Russian flying ace and fighter pilot during the First World War
- Alexander Vasilyevich Kazakov (1888–1950), Soviet lithologist and geochemist
- Aristarkh Kazakov (1878–1963), Russian revolutionary
- Grigori Kazakov (1913–1987), Soviet naval officer and Hero of the Soviet Union
- Ilya Kazakov (journalist) (born 1972), Russian football commentator, TV presenter and journalist
- Ivan Kazakov (1873–1935), Russian painter
- Konstantin Kazakov (1902–1989), Soviet artillery marshal
- Matvey Kazakov (1738–1812), Russian architect
- Mikhail Ilyich Kazakov (1901–1979), Soviet military leader and army general
- Mikhail Nikolayevich Kazakov (1920–1994), Soviet aircraft pilot and Hero of the Soviet Union
- Nikolai Kazakov (1918–?), Soviet poet from Mari El
- Pavel Kazakov (1928–2012), Soviet football referee
- Rodion Kazakov (1758–1803), Russian architect
- Stepan Kazakov (1914–1964), Soviet army officer and Hero of the Soviet Union
- Vasily Kazakov (1898–1968), Soviet artillery marshal and Hero of the Soviet Union
- Viktor Kazakov — several people
- Yury Kazakov (1927–1982), Russian author of short stories

== See also ==
- Kazak (surname)
- Kozak (surname)
- Kozakov (disambiguation)
