= Kozak =

Kozak may refer to:

- Kozak (surname)
- Kozak (armored personnel carrier), a Ukrainian family of infantry mobility vehicles
- 546275 Kozák, minor planet

== See also ==
- Kazak (disambiguation)
- Cossack (disambiguation)
- Kossak, a surname
- Kozak consensus sequence, a eukaryotic DNA sequence for ribosome binding
