= Kozak (surname) =

Kozak or Kozák (Czech and Slovak feminine: Kozáková) is a Slavic surname, literally meaning 'Cossack'. Notable people with the surname include:

- Amanda Kozak (born 1984), American beauty pageant winner
- Anděla Kozáková-Jírová (1897–1986), Czech lawyer
- Anna Kozak (born 1974), Belarusian sprinter
- Artem Kozak (born 1998), Ukrainian footballer
- Ashley Kozak, British jazz bassist, record producer and artists' manager
- Danuta Kozák (born 1987), Hungarian sprint canoer
- Dmitry Kozak (born 1958), Russian politician
- Don Kozak (born 1952), Canadian ice hockey player
- Edward Kozak (1902–1902), Ukrainian-American cartoonist
- Ferdo Kozak (1894–1957), Slovenian author, playwright, editor and politician
- Harley Jane Kozak (born 1957), American actress and author
- Heidi Kozak (born 1963), American actress
- Ivan Kozák (born 1970), Slovak footballer
- Ján Kozák (footballer born 1954), Slovak footballer
- Ján Kozák (footballer born 1980), Slovak footballer
- Jan Kozák (1929–2016), Czech basketball player
- Juš Kozak (1892–1964), Slovenian writer, playwright and editor
- Les Kozak (born 1940), Canadian ice hockey player
- Libor Kozák (born 1989), Czech footballer
- Lukáš Kozák (born 1991), Slovak ice hockey player
- Magdalena Kozak (writer) (born 1971), Polish writer
- Magdalena Kozak (chess player) (born 1988), Polish chess master
- Marilyn Kozak (born 1943), American microbiologist
- Michael Kozak (born 1946), American diplomat
- Miroslav Kozák (born 1976), Slovak footballer
- Mykhaylo Kozak (born 1991), Ukrainian footballer
- Oleksandr Kozak (born 1994), Ukrainian footballer
- Petr Kozák (born 1965), Czech orienteering competitor
- Petro Kozak (1911–1984), Ukrainian clandestine Greek-Catholic hierarch, auxiliary bishop of Lviv (1983–1984)
- Primož Kozak (1929–1981), Slovenian playwright and essayist
- Richard Kozak (born 1949), Canadian politician
- Roman Mykolayovych Kozak (born 1957), Ukrainian politician
- Roman Yefimovich Kozak (1957–2010), Russian theatre actor and director
- Semyon Kozak (1902–1953), Soviet general
- Scott Kozak (born 1965), American football linebacker
- Syarhey Kozak (born 1981), Belarusian footballer
- Tyson Kozak (born 2002), Canadian ice hockey player
- Václav Kozák (1937–2004), Czech rower
- Warren Kozak (born 1951), American writer and journalist
- Wojciech Kozak (born 1963), Polish politician
- Yevhen Kozak (1857–1933), Ukrainian philologist from Bukovina
- Zbigniew Kozak (born 1961), Polish politician

== See also ==
- Kazak (surname)
- Kozakov (disambiguation)
- Kazakov
- Cossack (disambiguation)
- Kossak
