= Cossack (disambiguation) =

Cossacks are an ethnic group originating in Ukraine and southern Russia.

Cossack or Cossacks may also refer to:

== Arts and entertainment ==
- The Cossacks (novel), by Leo Tolstoy

=== Films ===
- The Cossacks (1928 film), an American silent drama film
- The Cossacks (1960 film), starring Edmund Purdom
- The Cossacks (1961 film), based on the novel
- Cossacks (cartoon series), a long-running Ukrainian series of short films established in 1967
- Cossacks Go, a Ukrainian 1991 film

=== Video games ===
- Cossacks, a real-time strategy video game series
  - Cossacks: European Wars, a 2001 Ukrainian made video game
  - Cossacks II: Napoleonic Wars, its sequel
  - Cossacks 3, the third game in the series
- Doctor Cossack, a character in the video game Mega Man 4

== Military ==
- HMS Cossack, various British Royal Navy ships
- USS Cossack (1861), a Union Navy bark during the American Civil War
- USS Cossack (SP-695), a patrol boat in commission from 1917 to 1919
- Antonov An-225 Mriya, a Soviet cargo aircraft, NATO reporting name Cossack
- Sunbeam Cossack, a British 12-cylinder aero engine developed during the First World War
- Persian Cossack Brigade, a former military force in Iran
- Cossack cavalry, Polish light cavalry formation

== Places in Australia ==
- Cossack, Northern Territory, a suburb of the town of Katherine
- Municipality of Cossack, Western Australia, a former local government area
  - Cossack, Western Australia, a ghost town within the former municipality

== Transportation ==
- Cossack (ship), various ships
- Cossack motorcycle, brand name for several motorcycles made in the former Soviet Union
- Cossack, a model of the Lada Niva Russian automobile

== Other uses ==
- Cossacks Motorcycle Club, an American motorcycle gang
- Peter the Cossack (died 1592), Prince of Moldavia in 1592, also known as simply the Cossack
- Cossack (horse) (1844–after 1862), also known as The Cossack, a British thoroughbred racehorse
- Eskimo bowline, also called a Cossack knot, a type of knot

== See also ==
- Cassock, an ankle-length clerical robe
- Lajos Kassák (1887–1967), Hungarian poet, novelist, painter, essayist, editor and theoretician of the avant-garde
- Kazak (disambiguation)
- Kazakh (disambiguation)
- Kazaky, a Ukrainian pop band
