= Château de Labastide-Paumès =

16th-century castle in Occitania, France

Coordinates: 43°20′5″N 0°56′40″E

The Château de Labastide-Paumès is a 16th-century castle in the commune of Labastide-Paumès in the Haute-Garonne département of France. It includes a large tower with a spiral staircase.

Privately owned, it has been listed since 1927 as a monument historique by the French Ministry of Culture.

== See also ==
- List of castles in France
