= Anne E. Kazak =

American clinical psychologist, educator and editor

- Education: Smith College

Anne E. Kazak is an American clinical psychologist, educator and editor. She has focused on pediatric psychology. Much of her research involves "interventions to enhance adaptive functioning and reduce child and family distress associated with serious pediatric illnesses."

== Early life and education ==
Kazak earned a bachelor's degree in psychology from Smith College in 1977. She earned her master's degree in psychology and her PhD in clinical-community psychology at the University of Virginia in 1980 and 1983, respectively, then completed her internship training at the department of psychiatry of Yale School of Medicine.

== Career ==
Kazak is a licensed psychologist. She has been the Director of the Department of Psychology at Children's Hospital of Philadelphia and was Professor and Director of Psychology Research in the Department of Pediatrics at the University of Pennsylvania's Perelman School of Medicine, where she is Emeritus Professor CE of Psychology in Pediatrics. She is professor of pediatrics at Thomas Jefferson University's Sidney Kimmel Medical College in Philadelphia, Pennsylvania. She is also an adjunct professor of psychology at the University of Delaware. Kazak is Director of the Center for Healthcare Delivery Science at Nemours Children's Health System, part of A.I. du Pont Hospital for Children in Wilmington, Delaware. Additionally, she is co-director of the Center for Pediatric Traumatic Stress.

She edited the Journal of Pediatric Psychology as well as the Journal of Family Psychology. She also served as editor-in-chief of Health Psychology and is the current Editor in Chief of American Psychologist.

She is a member of the American Board of Professional Psychology (ABPP) and is a member of the Council of Representatives (2016-2021) representing Division 54 (Society of Pediatric Psychology).

== Journals ==
- Kazak, Anne E.; Marvin, Robert S. (January 1984). "Differences, Difficulties and Adaptation: Stress and Social Networks in Families with a Handicapped Child". Family Relations. 33 (1): 67. doi:10.2307/584591. JSTOR 584591.
- Streisand, R. (1 April 2001). "Childhood Illness-Related Parenting Stress: The Pediatric Inventory for Parents". Journal of Pediatric Psychology. 26 (3): 155–162. doi:10.1093/jpepsy/26.3.155. PMID 11259517.
- Barakat, Lamia P.; Alderfer, Melissa A.; Kazak, Anne E. (1 May 2006). "Posttraumatic Growth in Adolescent Survivors of Cancer and Their Mothers and Fathers". Journal of Pediatric Psychology. 31 (4): 413–419. doi:10.1093/jpepsy/jsj058. PMID 16093518.

== Books ==
- Promoting Children's Health: Integrating School, Family, and Community (2003), with Thomas J. Power, George J. DuPaul, and Edward S. Shapiro. Guilford Press. ISBN 9781572308558
- Effective and Emerging Treatments in Pediatric Psychology (2005), with Anthony Spirito. Oxford University Press. ISBN 9780198040712
- Pediatric Psycho-oncology: A Quick Reference on the Psychosocial Dimensions of Cancer Symptom Management (2015), with Lori S. Wiener, Maryland Pao, Mary Jo Kupst, Robert J. Arceci, and Andrea Farkas Patenaude. Oxford University Press. ISBN 9780199335114

== Personal life ==
Kazak resides in Havertown, Pennsylvania, near Philadelphia.
