= Zbigniew Kozak =

Polish politician (born 1961)

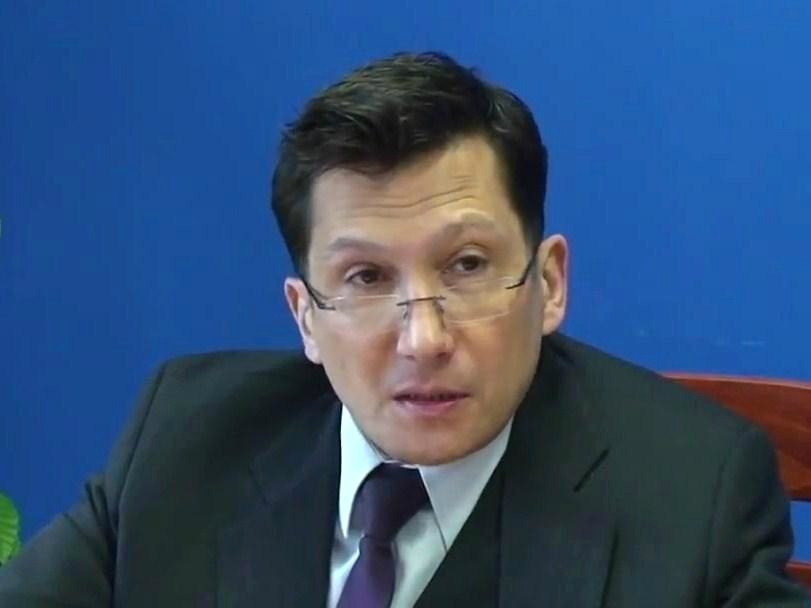

member of Sejm 2005-2007
- In office 25 September 2005 – ?

Personal details
- Born: 1961 (age 64–65)
- Party: Law and Justice

Zbigniew Ryszard Kozak (born 3 April 1961 in Gdynia) is a Polish politician. He was elected to the Sejm on 25 September 2005, getting 7,901 votes in 26 Gdynia district as a candidate from the Law and Justice list.

== See also ==
- Members of Polish Sejm 2005-2007
