= Mikhail Kozakov (chess player) =

Ukrainian chess player

Mikhail Kazakov
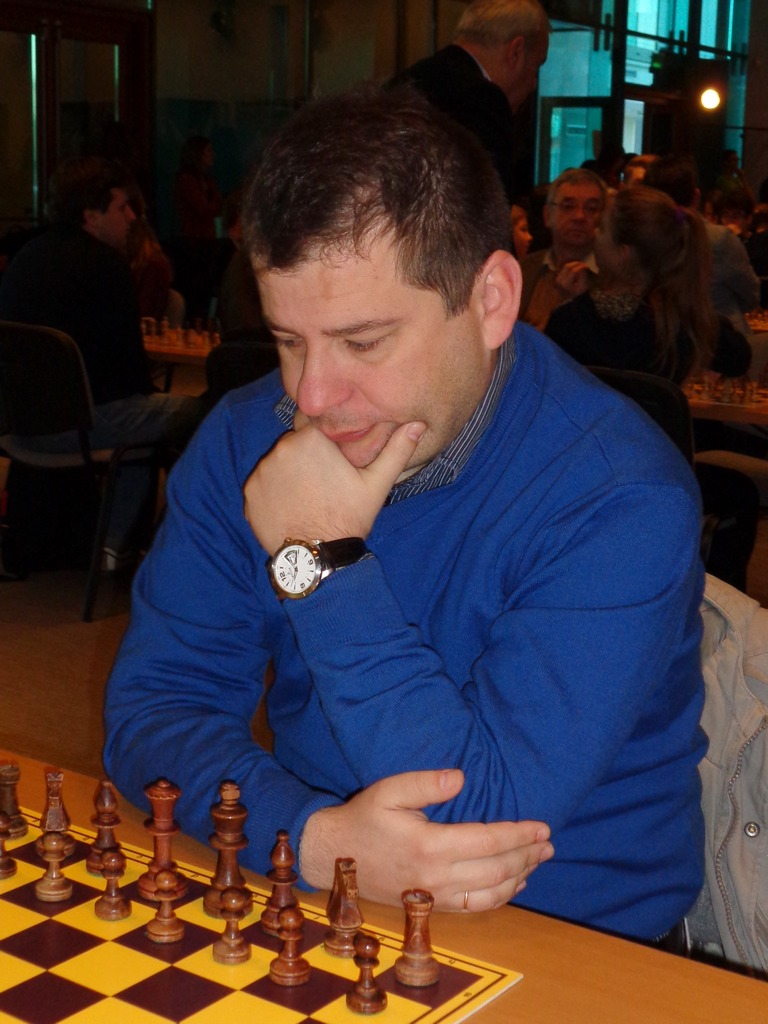
- Kozakov playing in the Independence Tournament in Warsaw (Poland) in 2013

Personal information
- Born: Mikhail Rustamovich Kozakov; May 28, 1972 (age 54) Lviv, Ukrainian SSR, Soviet Union

Chess career
- Title: Grandmaster (2001)
- FIDE rating: 2513 (July 2026)
- Peak rating: 2527 (September 2017)

Mikhail Rustamovich Kozakov (Ukrainian: Михайло Рустамович Козаков, in some sources erroneously spelled Kazakov; born May 28, 1972, in Lviv) is a Ukrainian chess player. He was awarded the title Grandmaster (GM) in 2001 by the FIDE.

== Biography and career ==
Kazakov studied at the Lviv State University of Physical Culture's chess department, and graduated with a master's degree in 1993. He obtained the title of International Master in 1996 from the FIDE, ad Grand Mater in 2001. He is also a chess coach, and organized various chess tournaments.

In 2002, he participated in the European Chess Clubs Cup, as part of the Lviv-base Karpaty-Galicia Club. He participated several times in the French Chess Championship; in 1999 for Le Mans Chess Club, then in 2008, 2009 and 2014 for the Bois-Colombes Chess Club. In 2015, Kozakov was Serbian Second League Champion.
