= USS Cossack =

USS Cossack has been the name of more than one United States Navy ship, and may refer to:

- USS Cossack (1861), part of the Stone Fleet during the American Civil War
- USS Cossack (SP-695), a patrol boat in commission from 1917 to 1919

== See also ==
- HMS Cossack
