= Ambax =

- Commune
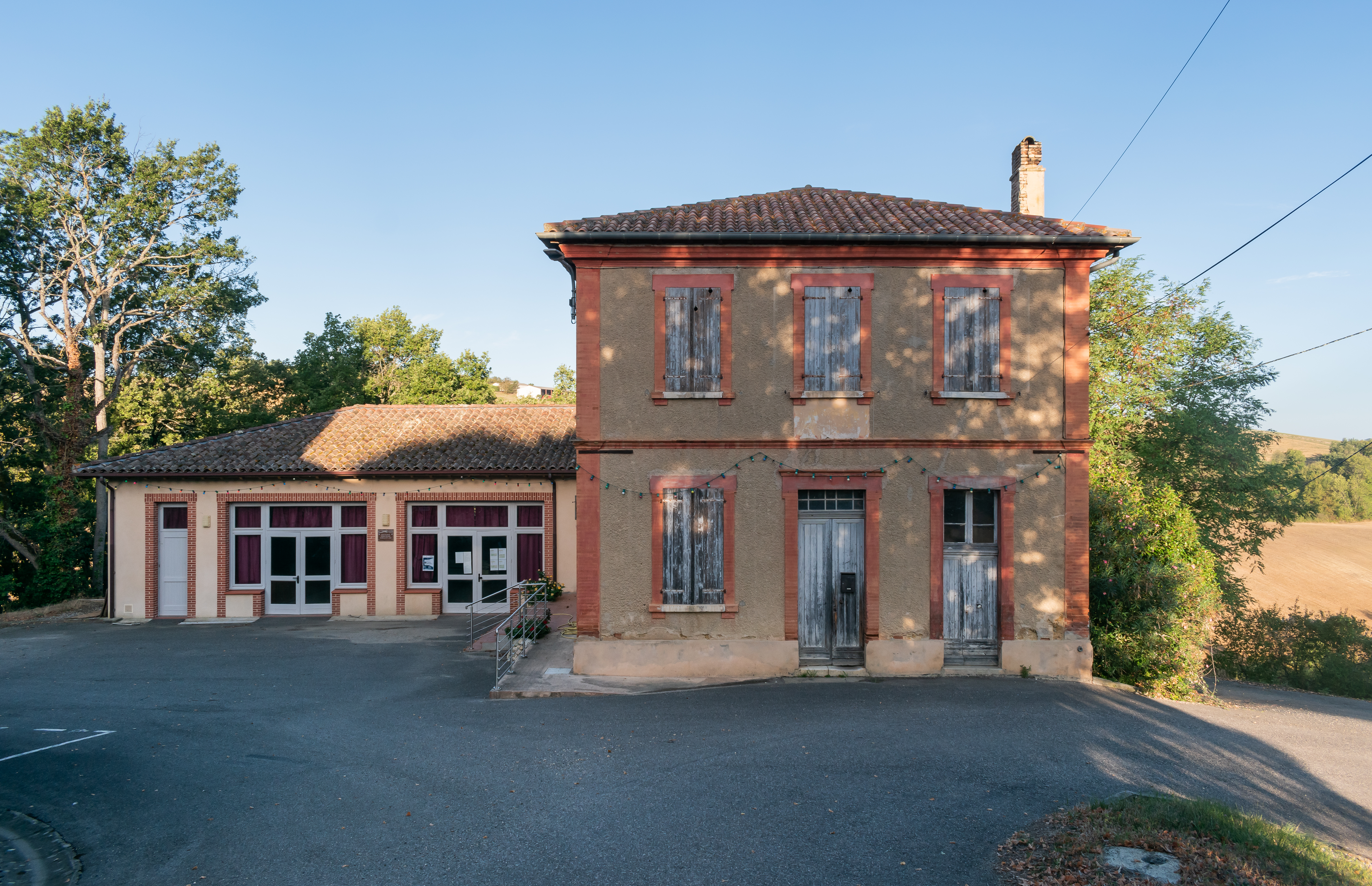
- Town hall of Ambax
- Location of Ambax
- Location within France Location within Occitanie
- Coordinates: 43°22′09″N 0°56′05″E
- Country: France
- Region: Occitania
- Department: Haute-Garonne
- Arrondissement: Saint-Gaudens
- Canton: Cazères
- Intercommunality: Cœur et Coteaux de Comminges

Government
  - Mayor (2020–2026): Daniel Miquel
- Area^{1}: 5.95 km^{2} (2.30 sq mi)
- Elevation: 400 m (1,300 ft)
- Highest elevation: 348 m (1,142 ft)
- Lowest elevation: 203 m (666 ft)
- Population (2023): 57
  - Density: 9.6/km^{2} (25/sq mi)
- Time zone: UTC+01:00 (CET)
  - Summer (DST): UTC+02:00 (CEST)
- INSEE/Postal code: 31007 /31230
- ^{1} French Land Register data, which excludes lakes, ponds, glaciers > 1 km^{2} (0.386 sq mi or 247 acres) and river estuaries.

Ambax is a commune in the Haute-Garonne department in southwestern France.

== Population ==
Historical population
Year	Pop.	±% p.a.
1968	83	—
1975	83	+0.00%
1982	76	−1.25%
1990	77	+0.16%
1999	72	−0.74%
2007	69	−0.53%
2012	73	+1.13%
2017	67	−1.70%
2023	57	−2.66%
Source: INSEE

== See also ==
- Communes of the Haute-Garonne department
