= Riolas =

- Commune
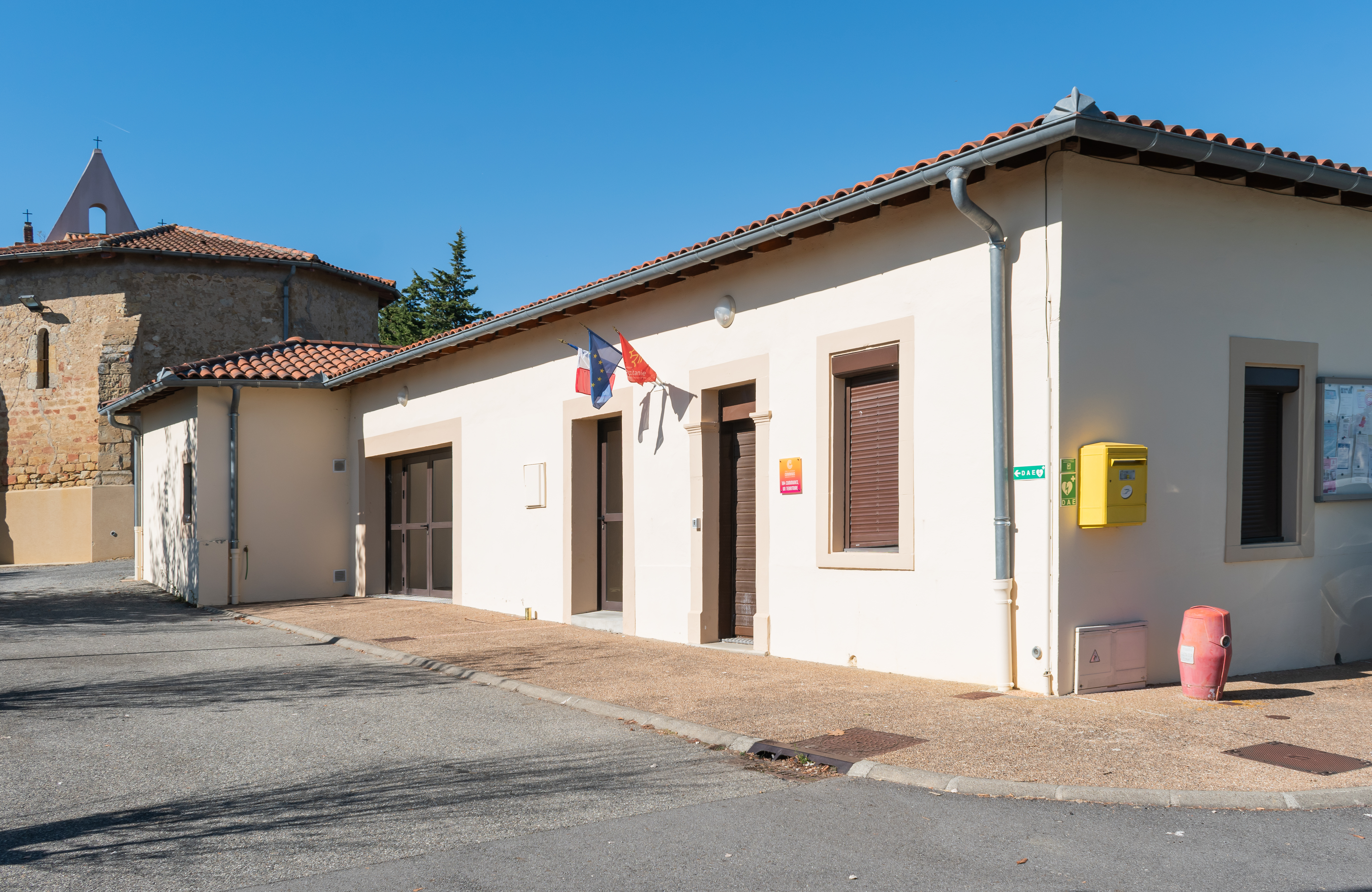
- Town hall of Riolas
- Location of Riolas
- Location within France Location within Occitanie
- Coordinates: 43°21′00″N 0°55′03″E
- Country: France
- Region: Occitania
- Department: Haute-Garonne
- Arrondissement: Saint-Gaudens
- Canton: Cazères

Government
  - Mayor (2020–2026): Michel Duprat
- Area^{1}: 2.86 km^{2} (1.10 sq mi)
- Elevation: 340 m (1,120 ft)
- Highest elevation: 352 m (1,155 ft)
- Lowest elevation: 239 m (784 ft)
- Population (2023): 57
  - Density: 20/km^{2} (52/sq mi)
- Time zone: UTC+01:00 (CET)
  - Summer (DST): UTC+02:00 (CEST)
- INSEE/Postal code: 31456 /31230
- ^{1} French Land Register data, which excludes lakes, ponds, glaciers > 1 km^{2} (0.386 sq mi or 247 acres) and river estuaries.

Riolas is a commune in the Haute-Garonne department in southwestern France.

== Population ==
Historical population
Year	Pop.	±% p.a.
1968	63	—
1975	41	−5.95%
1982	36	−1.84%
1990	31	−1.85%
1999	42	+3.43%
2007	48	+1.68%
2012	49	+0.41%
2017	48	−0.41%
2023	57	+2.91%
Source: INSEE

== See also ==
- Communes of the Haute-Garonne department
