= Cossacks Go =

1991 adventure film

Cossacks Go; Kozaky Ydut
- Directed by: Serhiy Omelchuk
- Written by: Bohdan Zholdak
- Starring: Mykhailo Holubovych; Oleg Maslennikov; Yuri Mazhuha; Inna Kapinos; Les Zadniprovskyi
- Cinematography: Vitaliy Zymovets
- Music by: Oleh Kiva
- Production company: Ros
- Release date: 1991
- Running time: 89 minutes
- Country: Ukraine
- Language: Ukrainian

Cossacks Go (Ukrainian: «Козаки йдуть», romanized: Kozaky ydut) is a 1991 Ukrainian adventure film directed by Serhiy Omelchuk.

== Plot ==
The film is set in Ukrainian Rus' of the end of the 15th century. Suddenly, all the gunpowder made at the manufactories disappears. The Cossacks, led by Maxim Trituz, gather together to find one of the convoys carrying gunpowder to the sich.

== Cast ==
- Mykhailo Holubovych as Maksym Trytuz
- Inna Kapinos as Nastka
- Les Zadniprovskyi as Stas Malchevsky
- Yuri Muravytsky as Jesuit
- Yuri Mazhuha as Som
- Oleg Maslennikov as Overko
- Andryi Borysenko as Talamara
- Olexandr Lytovchenko as Ivan Spudey
- Yuriy Potapenko as Cherkas
