= Labastide-Paumès =

Labastide-Paumès La Bastida de Paumèrs (Occitan)
- Commune
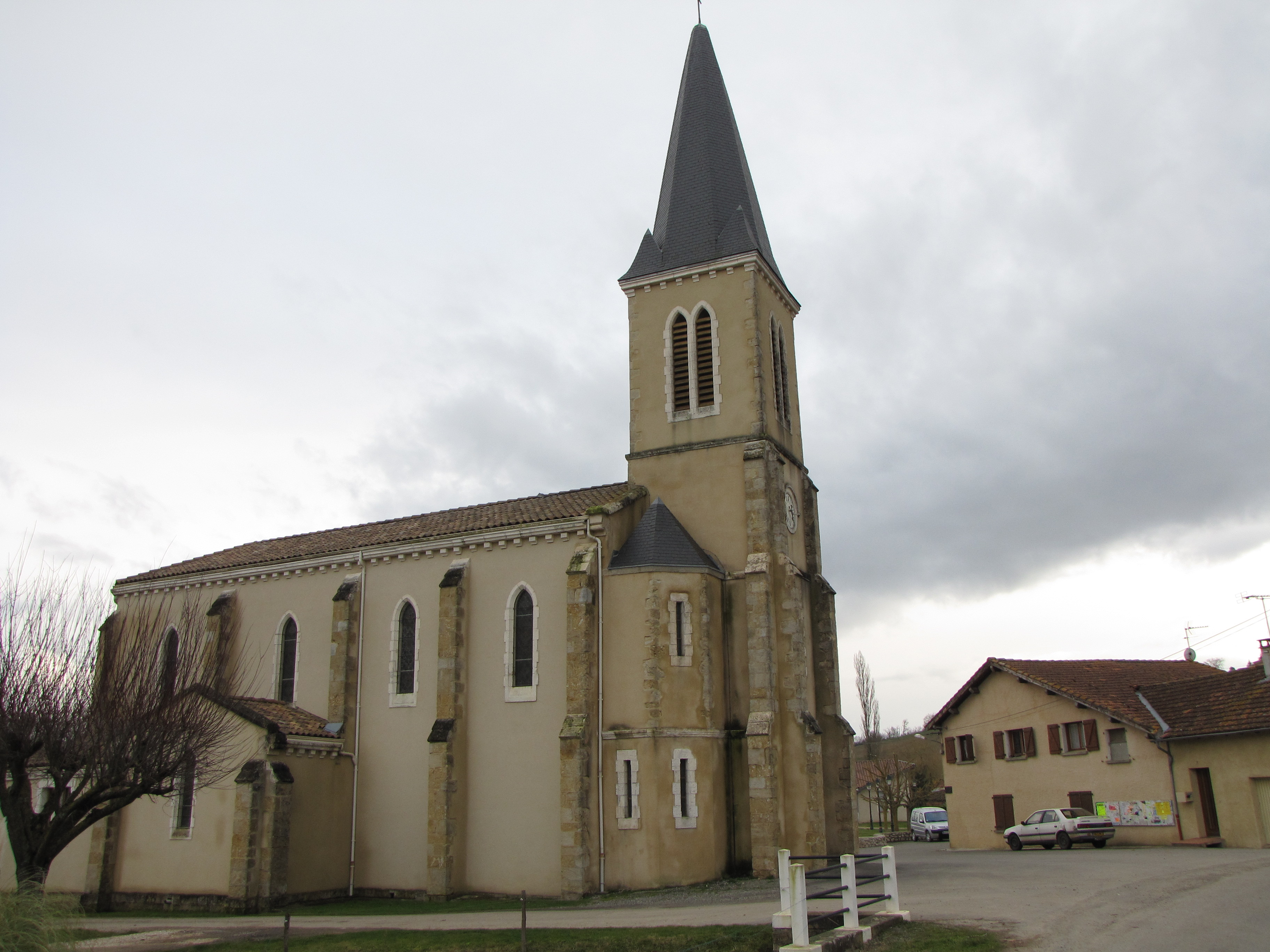
- The church in Labastide-Paumès
- Location of Labastide-Paumès
- Location within France Location within Occitanie
- Coordinates: 43°20′15″N 0°56′19″E
- Country: France
- Region: Occitania
- Department: Haute-Garonne
- Arrondissement: Saint-Gaudens
- Canton: Cazères

Government
  - Mayor (2020–2026): Catherine Brumas
- Area^{1}: 8.04 km^{2} (3.10 sq mi)
- Elevation: 262 m (860 ft)
- Highest elevation: 345 m (1,132 ft)
- Lowest elevation: 247 m (810 ft)
- Population (2023): 150
  - Density: 19/km^{2} (48/sq mi)
- Time zone: UTC+01:00 (CET)
  - Summer (DST): UTC+02:00 (CEST)
- INSEE/Postal code: 31251 /31230
- ^{1} French Land Register data, which excludes lakes, ponds, glaciers > 1 km^{2} (0.386 sq mi or 247 acres) and river estuaries.

Labastide-Paumès (French pronunciation: [labastid pomɛs]; Occitan: La Bastida de Paumèrs) is a commune in the Haute-Garonne department in southwestern France.

== Population ==
Historical population
Year	Pop.	±% p.a.
1968	145	—
1975	135	−1.02%
1982	143	+0.83%
1990	127	−1.47%
1999	127	+0.00%
2007	129	+0.20%
2012	151	+3.20%
2017	146	−0.67%
2023	150	+0.45%
Source: INSEE

== Sights ==
The Château de Labastide-Paumès dates back in parts to the 9th century. The main building is circa 1164 castle which includes a large tower with a spiral staircase, built approximately one hundred years later. Privately owned, it has been listed since 1927 as a historic site by the French Ministry of Culture.

== See also ==
- Communes of the Haute-Garonne department
