= Sénarens =

- Commune
- Location of Sénarens
- Location within France Location within Occitanie
- Coordinates: 43°21′02″N 0°58′46″E
- Country: France
- Region: Occitania
- Department: Haute-Garonne
- Arrondissement: Muret
- Canton: Cazères

Government
  - Mayor (2020–2026): Bernard Laguens
- Area^{1}: 6.93 km^{2} (2.68 sq mi)
- Elevation: 320 m (1,050 ft)
- Highest elevation: 345 m (1,132 ft)
- Lowest elevation: 244 m (801 ft)
- Population (2023): 118
  - Density: 17.0/km^{2} (44.1/sq mi)
- Time zone: UTC+01:00 (CET)
  - Summer (DST): UTC+02:00 (CEST)
- INSEE/Postal code: 31543 /31430
- ^{1} French Land Register data, which excludes lakes, ponds, glaciers > 1 km^{2} (0.386 sq mi or 247 acres) and river estuaries.

Sénarens is a commune in the Haute-Garonne department in southwestern France.

== Population ==
Historical population
Year	Pop.	±% p.a.
1968	128	—
1975	122	−0.68%
1982	107	−1.86%
1990	108	+0.12%
1999	101	−0.74%
2007	106	+0.61%
2012	120	+2.51%
2017	104	−2.82%
2023	118	+2.13%
Source: INSEE

== See also ==
- Communes of the Haute-Garonne department
