= Ivan Kazakov =

Ivan Kazakov (Иван Семёнович Казаков)
- Born: Ivan Semyonovich Kazakov; 1 February 1873; Kasilova, Oryol Governorate
- Died: 16 October 1935 (aged 62); Tashkent
- Education: Moscow School of Painting, Sculpture and Architecture; Imperial Academy of Arts
- Known for: Painter, teacher
- Movement: Orientalist

Ivan Semyonovich Kazakov (Russian: Иван Семёнович Казаков; (1 February 1873 in Kasilova, Oryol Governorate – 16 October 1935 in Tashkent) was a painter and graphic artist; residing in the Russian Empire and later the Uzbek Soviet Socialist Republic.

== Biography ==
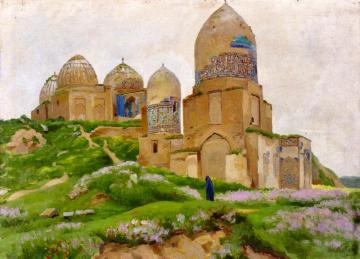
Domes of the Shah-i-Zinda

He was born to a family of farmers. From 1888 to 1894, he studied at the Moscow School of Painting, Sculpture and Architecture. He continued at the Imperial Academy of Arts under Vladimir Makovsky and was awarded the title of "Artist" in 1898.

His title included a stipend to study abroad so, from 1899 through 1900, he travelled to Italy, France and Germany. Upon returning, he settled in Saint Petersburg. For the next decade, he was a frequent exhibitor there and in Moscow.

In 1906, he requested and obtained a position as a teacher of drawing and calligraphy at the Realschule in Tashkent, which he held until 1910. While there he painted architectural landscapes in Samarkand and Bukhara as well as Tashkent. He also created a series of ethnographic sketches.

He later taught at a regional art school and, in 1921, established his own studio. On several occasions, he helped organize and design revolutionary celebrations. During this time, he had showings at the first National Free Exhibition of Art in Saint Petersburg (then Petrograd), the 47th (penultimate) exhibit of the Peredvizhniki in Moscow (1922), and the first exhibit of the Tashkent branch of the Russian Academy of Arts, of which he was one of the founders (1928). From 1926 to 1930, he was an organizing member of the Tashkent branch of the Association of Artists of Revolutionary Russia (AKhRR) and headed their studio.

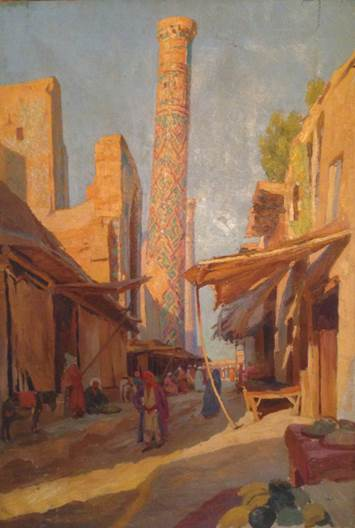
Street in Samarkand

In 1930, a feuilleton about Kazakov and his fellow-artist, Yeremey Burtsev (1894–1942), appeared in Pravda Vostoka. Its pseudonymous author accused them of having their students paint figures of Christ and Saint Paul and suggested that the AKhRR branch in Tashkent be investigated by "Glavprofobra" (the General Directorate of Vocational Education). This was done and the artists were charged with anti-Soviet agitation. A special board meeting by local members of the OGPU (Joint State Political Directorate) sentenced them to three years exile in Stalinabad (Dushanbe).

Burtsev's exile was later extended. Kazakov returned in 1933 and spent his final years teaching at the Tashkent Polytechnic Institute.

== See also ==
- List of Orientalist artists
- Orientalism
