= HMS Cossack =

Six ships of the Royal Navy have borne the name HMS Cossack, after the Cossack people of Eastern Europe, whilst another was begun but was cancelled while building:

- HMS Cossack (1806) was a 22-gun sixth-rate post-ship, begun under the name Pandour in 1805, but renamed before being launched in 1806. She was broken up in 1816.
- HMS Cossack was to have been a steam gunvessel, laid down at Portsmouth Dockyard in 1846, but cancelled in May 1849.
- HMS Cossack (1854) was ordered as the Russian ship Witjas, a wood screw corvette building on the Thames at Northfleet, but the British government seized her while she was under construction in 1854; she was sold in 1875.
- HMS Cossack (1886) was an Archer-class torpedo cruiser launched in 1886 and sold in 1905.
- HMS Cossack (1907) was a Tribal-class destroyer launched in 1907 and sold in 1919.
- HMS Cossack (F03) was a Tribal-class destroyer launched in 1937 and sunk four days after being torpedoed by the German submarine U-563 in 1941, when attempts to tow her to safety failed.
- HMS Cossack (R57) was a C-class destroyer launched in 1944 and broken up in 1961.

== See also ==
- USS Cossack
