= Cossack (1813 Liverpool ship) =

History

United Kingdom
- Name: Cossack
- Launched: 1813
- Fate: Wrecked 4 December 1823

General characteristics
- Tons burthen: 174 (bm)
- Armament: 6 × 6-pounder + 4 × 12-pounder carronades

Cossack was launched in 1813 in Liverpool. She traded across the Atlantic, first to the Caribbean and then to Northern Canada. She underwent two maritime mishaps, the second of which in December 1823 resulted in her loss.

== Career ==
Cossack first appeared in Lloyd's Register (LR) in 1813.

Year	Master	Owner	Trade	Source
1813	Hughes	Richey & Co.	Liverpool–"SSeba"	LR
1814	Hughes	Richey & Co.	Liverpool–South Seas	LR
1814	J.Hughes	J.Ritchie	Liverpool–Santo Domingo	Register of Shipping (RS)

Although LR reported that Cossack intended to sail to the South Seas, i.e., the Southern Whale Fishery, the Register of Shipping was more accurate when it reported that Cossack was sailing to the Caribbean.

Cossack arrived at St Thomas from Liverpool on 19 December 1813. She reached Cap-Henry, Santo Domingo on 10 February 1814. On 24 March she arrived at Jamaica from Cape Henry and on 14 April sailed from Jamaica for Cork. On 6 July she sailed from Cork for London, having come from St. Domingo. On 14 October Cossack arrived at Gravesend from St. Domingo.

Year	Master	Owner	Trade	Source
1815	J.Hughes; C.Pitt	J.Ritchie	Liverpool–Santo Domingo; London–Demerara	RS
1816	J.Hughes; Hill	Richey & Co.	London–Port-au-Prince	LR
1818	J.Walker	Captain & Co.	Liverpool–Canada	LR

In June 1820 Lloyd's List reported that Cossack, Walker, master, had struck on Alcide Rock, near Bic Island. She was on a voyage from Liverpool to Montreal but had to discharge her cargo at Quebec as she had sustained damage. She arrived at Quebec on 20 May.

There was a report that on 15 January 1821 Cossack, Walker, master, had arrived at Madeira and had sailed the next day for Bombay. Another report had her arriving at Barbados, from Cork on 7 February. On 15 June Cossack arrived at Dublin from Trinidad.

== Fate ==
A report from Milford, dated 4 December 1823, stated that Cossack, Walker, master, with a cargo of lumber, had run ashore at Newgate Sands. She was on a voyage from Miramichi Bay to Dublin. Her crew was saved. She was a complete wreck but it was hoped that her materials and cargo could be saved if the weather was moderate.
