= Cossack (1813 Quebec ship) =

History

United Kingdom
- Port of registry: Quebec (1813–1814); London (1814–1823)
- Builder: John Munn, Sr. & John Munn, Quebec
- Launched: 16 August 1813
- Fate: Damaged December 1823 and probably condemned

General characteristics
- Tons burthen: 410, or 41026/94, or 421, or 445 (bm)
- Length: 109 ft (33 m)
- Beam: 30 ft (9.1 m)
- Armament: 2 guns

Cossack was launched in Quebec in 1813 and then moved her registry to the United Kingdom. She made one voyage to the East Indies under a license from the British East India Company. She was damaged December 1823 and probably condemned.

== Career ==
A letter dated 1 February 1814 to the registry in Quebec reported that Cossack's registry had been transferred to the United Kingdom. However, Cossack did not appear in Lloyd's Register (LR) until the 1815 volume.

Year	Master	Owner	Trade	Source
1815	G.Threw	G.J.Parker	London–Charleston	LR
1816	G.Threw; J.Rodgers	G.J.Parker	London–Charleston	LR

In 1813 the EIC had lost its monopoly on the trade between India and Britain. British ships were then free to sail to India or the Indian Ocean under a license from the EIC.

On 24 August 1817 Captain S.M'Peath sailed Cossack for Bombay, sailing under a license from the EIC. At the time her owners were J. Bell & Co. She arrived back in the Downs on 23 March 1819 from Mauritius and St Helena. She had reached Batavia, but had not stopped in India.

Year	Master	Owner	Trade	Source & notes
1818	M'Beath	Reed & Co.	London–CGH	LR
1820	M'Beath	Reed & Co.	London–New York	LR
1822	M'Beath; R.Craig	Bell & Co.	Liverpool–New Orleans	LR
1823	R.Craig	Bell & Co.	Liverpool–Derry	LR
1824	Thompson	Buchanan	Bristol–New York	Register of Shipping; damages repaired 1821

== Fate ==
On 19 or 24 December 1823 Cossack, Thompson, master, was driven ashore at Sandy Hook. Cossack had been refloated and towed in to New York City by 29 December. She had a cargo of 300 tons of iron, 1000 boxes of tin, etc. Lighters came and removed part of the cargo and her mail. She was from Bristol and consigned to the British Consul. The initial report was that she had not bilged and might be gotten off. Cossack had been refloated and towed in to New York City by 29 December. Lloyd's List reported that she had received material damage as some of her timbers were broken. It was with great difficulty that she was kept afloat as she was taken into New York, in part because of her cargo of iron.

Cossack was last listed in the Register of Shipping in 1824. LR carried her for a few more years but with data unchanged from 1823.
