= List of Polish Righteous Among the Nations =

This is a list of families and individuals recognised as Righteous Among the Nations for rendering rescue and assistance to Jews persecuted by Nazi Germany during the Holocaust in Poland. As of 1 January 2019, there are 7,232 men and women recognized as Polish Righteous Among the Nations, over a quarter of the 28,486 recognized by Yad Vashem in total.

== A ==
- Irena Adamowicz: a courier for the underground Home Army (Armia Krajowa) who provided information to a number of Jewish ghettos in occupied Poland. In 1985, Adamowicz was posthumously bestowed the title of the Righteous Among the Nations by Yad Vashem.
- Antonowicz family (Wincenty Antonowicz along with his wife Jadwiga and teenage daughter Lucyna Antonowicz-Bauer) sheltered the 20-year-old Jewish woman Bronisława Malberg in their house after the liquidation of the Wilno Ghetto during the Nazi German occupation of Poland in World War II, as well as two other Jewish families including Henia and Adi Kulgan. Wincenty and his wife Jadwiga were posthumously bestowed the titles of Righteous Among the Nations by Yad Vashem on June 14, 1998.
- Ferdynand Arczyński: one of the founding members of an underground organization Żegota (Council for Aid to Jews) in German-occupied Poland. Arczyński worked tirelessly for Żegota, serving not only as treasurer but also as head of its "legalization" department, which produced forged documents distributed to Jews. He also acted as a liaison with branches of Żegota. In 1965, Arczynski visited Israel, where on May 18, 1965, Yad Vashem recognized him as Righteous Among the Nations.

== B ==
- Banasiewicz family: The family of Franciszek and Magdalena Banasiewicz with sons: Jerzy, Tadeusz, Antoni, and daughter Maria lived on a farm in Orzechowce near Przemyśl during the Nazi German occupation of Poland in World War II. In July 1991 they were bestowed the titles of Righteous among the Nations by Yad Vashem for rescuing fifteen Jews escaping the Holocaust from the ghetto in Przemyśl.
- Zofia Baniecka was a Polish member of the Resistance during World War II. In addition to relaying guns and other materials to resistance fighters, Baniecka and her mother sheltered over 50 Jews in their home between 1941 and 1944. She was recognized as a Righteous Among the Nations, posthumously, in 2016.
- Władysław Bartoszewski from 1942 was active in the Provisional Committee for Aid to Jews and its successor organization, the Council for Aid to Jews (codenamed Żegota). After the war, he contributed to the strengthening of Polish-Israeli ties.
- Jerzy Bielecki was one of the few inmates of the Auschwitz concentration camp who managed to escape the camp successfully, a feat he did while saving his Jewish girlfriend.
- Bilecki family, including Julian Bilecki, saved about 20 Jews from Pidhaitsi Ghetto who sought refuge at their farm
- Andrzej Bogucki and wife Janina sheltered Jewish composer Władysław Szpilman.
- Władysław Bońkowski: After the liquidation of the Sambor Ghetto, Władysław Bońkowski, a restaurant manager at the Sambor train station, offered shelter to a group of sixteen Jews who escaped from the ghetto, and successfully hid them throughout the remainder of the war. Bońkowski was recognised as Righteous in 1967.
- Anna Borkowska saved 17 young Jewish Zionists in her Vilna convent.
- Szczepan Bradło and family saved three Jewish families of 13 in a dugout
- Cecylia and Maciej Brogowski sheltered a Jewish girl named Irena Sznycer in their village
- Janina Bukolska: Assisted with falsifying birth records and documents, as well as coordinating hiding locations for Jews in Warsaw.
- Maria Burdowa: During the German occupation of Poland, Maria Burdowa, a Polish flower seller from Jaworów, sheltered the Jewish siblings Eva (later Chava) and Marian (later Moshe) Klarfeld from Lwów. In April 1942, as anti-Jewish persecution intensified, their parents Salia and Richard Klarfeld entrusted the children to Burdowa, who continued to care for the one-year-old Marian and four-year-old Eva after their parents were murdered.
- Brust family: Four members of the Brust family in Czestochowa provided assistance and shelter for a number of Jewish refugees. One of them was murdered by Gestapo; the other three survived and received the Righteous award in 1979.
- Henryk Buszko: Buszko (age 30) farming near Białystok, rescued Jews who escaped from the Holocaust train heading from the Białystok Ghetto for the Treblinka extermination camp on 21 September 1943. Buszko was caught by the German gendarmerie arriving at Liza Stara from Pietkowo, and murdered for hiding Jews.

== C ==
- Zofia Celińska with parents sheltered several Jews, including Zofia Lewinówna.
- Edward Chacza: Chacza, a miner living in Baranavichy, Belarus, helped Jews escape the Baranavichy Ghetto into the surrounding forests where they made contact with Jewish partisans. He also provided medical care and food. Chacza was arrested in November 1943 but survived the war.
- Krystyna Cywińska: Krystyna Cywińska who lived in Grodno with two children was killed in 1943 for saving Jews. She was arrested after one of the Jewish girls at her home, Bella Ilin, went with her daughter Danuta Cywińska back to the Grodno Ghetto to rescue Bella's mother and brother. Bella (now Shulman) and Danuta were unsuccessful, but lived. Danuta rescued five other Jews soon thereafter.
- Marcin Czyżykowski: Czyżykowski, a Home Army member, brought in food and medicine into the Białystok Ghetto and on the way back took Jewish children to his and his wife Maria's home (up to twelve of them would wait there at a time, for placement with Polish families).

== D ==
- Krystyna Dańko, hid and supplied a Jewish family of four with food, clothing and money.
- Jan Dobraczyński, placed several hundred Jewish children in Catholic convents.
- Antoni Docha, with wife Janina and neighbours: Polish medical doctor Antoni Docha was asked by his prewar colleague Chaim Blumstein to help him and his family escape from the Grodno Ghetto. Docha bribed a Polish driver of a big German truck and went to the ghetto along with him. They put a dozen Jews under the rags and tarpaulin including Blumstein and Broide families and successfully crossed several German checkpoints. The driver finally broke down and asked Docha along with everybody else to get out of the lorry. They reached Docha's house in Indura on foot. Antoni Docha and his wife Janina took in more Jews as the time went on. All survived. Many kept corresponding after the war.
- Jadwiga Dudziec, teacher and scout activist in Vilnius, member of the Home Army, helped Jewish partisans.

== F ==
- Maria Fedecka saved 12 members of close Jewish families in Wilno
- Mieczysław Fogg hid a Jewish family in his apartment till the end of World War II

== G ==
- Andrzej Garbuliński, his two sons and neighbour Stanisław Owca. Except one of the sons, the others were killed for sheltering Alfenbeins family, who also perished.
- Antoni Gawryłkiewicz, saved three Jewish families consisting of 16 members
- Tadeusz Gebethner: Polish officer with the Home Army who from 1942 sheltered a Jewish family in his home in Warsaw during German occupation. He died as a prisoner of war in Germany at Stalag-XIA from wounds he had received during summer of the same year in the Warsaw Uprising on 14 October 1944.
- Matylda Getter, hid at least 40 Jewish children from the Warsaw Ghetto in Polish orphanages
- Zofia Olszakowska-Glazer saved Cypora Zonszajn with her baby from the Siedlce Ghetto before massacre
- Marceli Godlewski was a Polish Roman Catholic priest who helped dozens of Jewish converts in his parish in the Warsaw Ghetto.
- Andrzeja (Maria) Górska was a Polish Roman Catholic nun involved in the protection of Jewish children.
- Julian Grobelny (President of Żegota) with wife Halina, rescued a large number of Jews, mostly children
- Irena Gut Opdyke, rescued sixteen Jews while working in a laundy center at Tarnopol Ghetto
- Gutowska family: Wanda Lesisz, also Wanda Gutowska-Lesisz: a Polish resistance fighter, her mother (Leonia Gutowska) and sister (Janina Różecka-Gutowska) aided several Jews

== I ==
- Bolesław Idzikowski: Bolesław Idzikowski used to bring food to his many acquaintances in the Kielce Ghetto, and personally extricated over a dozen Jews from the ghetto by risking his own life. He saved Estera Jurkowski and her two brothers along with Mr Lapa, his wife, and their four-year-old daughter, as well as the Ksawer couple, and the family of Maciej Rusinek (false name from the Kennkarte), his wife, and their six-year-old daughter. Idzikowski, the Polish Righteous, used to secretly depart from Kielce with the Jews he had rescued, and placed them with his Polish friends elsewhere. Most of them survived the war.
- Henryk Iwański, an officer from Home Army (AK), and his wife Wiktoria provided arms and military support for the Warsaw Ghetto Uprising and hid Jewish fugitives. Iwański himself fought alongside the Jews in the Uprising.
- Jarosław Iwaszkiewicz and his wife Anna Iwaszkiewicz, writers and translators, sheltered several Jewish families and associates at their family villa.

== J ==
- Stefan Jagodziński, resistance member, saved Dr. Tenenwurzel's family of three
- Stanisław Jasiński and daughter Emilia hid four Jews who escaped the Volhynian massacres
- Karolina Juszczykowska was a Polish house worker who was executed for hiding two Jews

== K ==
- Jan Kaliszczuk: Kaliszczuk sheltered two Jewish partisans at his home, Judel Pitluk and Aron Lach, and after the liquidation of the Białystok Ghetto, supplied them with food and medicine and drove them to the forest. Both survived.
- Aleksander Kamiński (Home Army member) helped organize Jewish resistance in the Warsaw Ghetto
- Jan Karski first reported the Holocaust to President Franklin D. Roosevelt
- Celina Kędzierska: A group of Jewish children, some secretly smuggled out of the Sambor Ghetto, stayed at the Polish orphanage in Sambor, run by the Franciscan Sisters of the Family of Mary under the care of Mother Superior Celina Kędzierska, recognized as a Righteous Among the Nations in 2015.
- Kielan family including daughter Zofia Kielan-Jaworowska sheltered two Jewish women in Warsaw.
- Teresa Janina Kierocińska: Mother Superior of a Catholic content who organized a shelter for six local Jews.
- Klewicki family: In the face of extreme situation a postcard was sent from Częstochowa Ghetto to Józefów with no recipient and no street address except for three words: "I’ve fallen ill, (signed) Jadzia." The post-office in Józefów gave it to local alderman who managed to find the recipient only by looking at the stamp. He asked around for people with connection to Częstochowa. It was the Klewicki family, recognized as the Righteous Among the Nations in 1993. Stanisława Klewicka guessed that the postcard came from her childhood friend Jadzia Broniatowska, a Polish-Jewish dentist. She went to Częstochowa and rescued them all with false papers from the Polish underground including Jadzia and her husband Natan Rodał, Adela Mitelman, and his sister Natalia Frydrych with her son, joined by Dr Wacław Konar and his son Jerzy also from the ghetto. They hid until liberation at the Klewicki villa in Radość near Warsaw.
- Antoni Koper: provided fake documents and shelter for Jews in Warsaw
- Stefan Korboński, member of Polish resistance, gathered and publicized information about The Holocaust and saved several Jewish lives
- Wanda Makuch-Korulska helped a Jewish friend escape the Warsaw Ghetto and arranged a shelter for her afterwards
- Zofia Kossak-Szczucka (co-founder of Żegota) helped save several thousand Jews, especially children
- Maria Kotarba, a Polish inmate at Auschwitz, was recognized for delivering food and medicine, cooking for Jewish female prisoners and saving several Jewish lives through various activities
- Maria and Anna Koźmińska: During the liquidation of the Częstochowa Ghetto, a Jewish boy, Abraham Jabłoński, run away from the trains with the aid of a Polish Blue policeman and found refuge with Maria and Anna Koźmińska. He survived and contacted the two Righteous women from Israel after 47 years.
- The Kowalczyk family successfully sheltered nine Jewish acquaintances from the town of Huta Dąbrowa in their farmstead in the Rozłąki village.
- Władysław Kowalski, officer in the Polish Army, hid 50 Jews around Warsaw
- Benedykt Kraskowski: a carpenter who aided Jews working in his workshop
- Jerzy and Irena Krępeć with family saved over 30 Jews on their two rented estates near Płock
- The Królikiewicz family: The family of Królikiewicz received six medals in 1986 for rescuing two Jewish women who escaped from a train to Ravensbrück in November 1944.
- The Krzywicki family: In March 1943, Meir Trachtenberg with his wife and son escaped from the Grodno Ghetto and walked for 20 kilometres (12 mi) to Dulkowszczyzna, where they were rescued by Anna and Stanisław Krzywicki. All survived.
- Karol Kuryluk: a Polish journalist and diplomat who worked with Żegota, procured documents for the Jews and helped hide a number of individuals

== L ==
- Jan and Maria Langiewicz. Langiewicz Jan Michał was a Polish teacher in Warsaw, who sheltered several Jews in his school and apartment. In 1944 Jan was arrested by Gestapo and sent to the Stutthof concentration camp and later that year, Maria was also arrested and sent to a labor camp. Despite that, all of the Jews they sheltered survived the war. On October 22, 1981, the couple received the Righteous award.
- Jerzy and Eugenia Latoszyński temporarily adopted 12-year-old Artur Citryn sheltering him through the war
- Helena Lech: She was awarded her medal in 1988 for hiding a Jewish woman (Helena Tal) between the summer of 1943 and the arrival of the Soviets on January 18, 1945. Her husband, killed in 1944, received his medal posthumously in 1995.
- Czesław Lewicki sheltered Jewish composer Władysław Szpilman.
- Jerzy Jan Lerski (George J. Lerski), informed political circles abroad about the extermination and persecution of Jews
- Eryk Lipiński was involved in production of forged documents for the Jews in hiding
- Michał Lityński hid wounded resistance fighters and Jews escaped from the Warsaw ghetto

== M ==
- Wanda Makuch-Korulska: a Polish doctor who helped a Jewish friend escape the Warsaw Ghetto and arranged a shelter for her afterwards
- Albin Małysiak: A Polish bishop, chaplain at a hospice during the war, who together with Sister Bronisława Wilemska sheltered five Jews in their hospice
- Felicja Masojada: Polish teacher who hid and aided several Jews until being murdered by Ukrainian nationalists
- Misiewicz family: The Misiewicz family of Tarnopol saved the Bien family. Adam Misiewicz constructed a dug-out by the house, and the youngest Lunia Bien lived with the rescuers. The retreating Nazis burned the house to the ground after an unsuccessful search.
- Andrzej and Czesław Miłosz: During the occupation, the well-known poet Czesław Miłosz and his brother Andrzej were active in the Polish Underground; their activities include helping Jews hiding on the Aryan side of Warsaw. In 1943, Andrzej smuggled out Seweryn Tross and his wife to Warsaw, hidden in a truck. When they arrived in Warsaw, Czesław received Mr. and Mrs. Tross, found a place for them to hide and supported them financially. Czesław also helped Felicia Wołkominska, her sister and her sister-in-law, Jewish fugitives who had fled from Warsaw on the eve of the Warsaw Ghetto Uprising. The Tross couple was killed in the Warsaw Uprising in the summer of 1944, but Wołkominska survived, and in 1957 immigrated to Israel.

== N ==
- Igor Newerly, saved Janusz Korczak's diary of martyrdom, harboured several Warsaw Ghetto journalists

== O ==
- Jan and Mieczysław Oczyński: Amalia Mudrycki, a Jewish woman hiding on the Aryan side of Sambor, approached Jan and Mieczysław Oczyński – father and son living next door – with the plea to rescue her closest friends from the Drohobycz Ghetto. Jan was a railway engineer, Mieczysław was a violinist fresh from the conservatory. They took in Maksymilian Getlinger with his wife Leontyna and their son-in-law Alfred Herzig, as well as their friend Rachela. Also, Mieczysław went to Drohobycz with an address from Amalia and smuggled from the ghetto a 10-year-old boy, Adam. Feeding them all became a challenge, but the living conditions were exceptionally good. Mieczysław worked in the fields of his uncle Mr. Ochowicz to earn the extra food they needed. While there, he met the Jewish sisters in hiding, Basia and Ewa Schreiber. Basia was seriously ill. Mieczysław took her to Sambor and put her under the care of Herzig hiding in his own home. Meanwhile, the circumstances forced Amalia Mudrycki to also accept Oczyńskis' hospitality. All Jews survived, and with time left their homeland for Israel and Brazil. The Getlingers stayed in contact with the two Oczyńskis for many years. Jan and his son Mieczysław Oczyński were recognized as Righteous by Yad Vashem in September 1983.
- Janina Oyrzanowska-Poplewska and her sister Maria Oyrzanowska provided aid and housing to the Linfeld and Sterling families; their gardener, Jerzy Glinicki; and others, including Wiktoria Szczawińska and Franciszka Tusk (later known as Natalia Obrębka)

== P ==
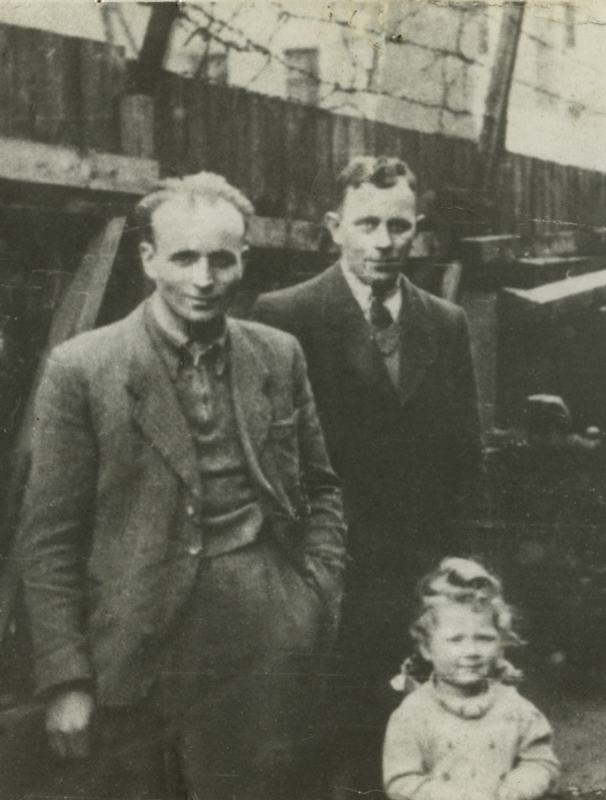
Alojzy Plewa (left), his brother Feliks, and Ruth Schwarz rescued from the Sambor Ghetto, 1942

- Tadeusz Pankiewicz operated the only pharmacy in the Jewish Ghetto of Kraków and distributed free medicine
- Julia Pępiak: hid a former Jewish neighbour and her daughter throughout the war
- Alfreda and Bolesław Pietraszek rescued several Jewish families consisting of 18 people
- Urszula Plenkiewicz: Krystyna Kon, a friend of Plenkiewicz's from school, was sheltered in the Plenkiewicz family apartment when the Warsaw Ghetto was sealed in late 1940. Plenkiewicz took Kon into her home shared with her mother and sister without disclosing her identity to them. Kon was able to obtain papers with the surname Kowalska and resided in the home for a year while she gave private lessons to support herself. She later relocated to the subhurbs outside of Warsaw, preparing children from wealthy families for matriculation examinations. Plenkiewicz was recognized as the Righteous by Yad Vashem in December 1994.
- Alojzy Plewa: Guta Gripel Korngold with her husband Henryk Schwarz and two-year-old daughter Ruth survived thanks to help from Alojzy Plewa, a Polish Righteous from Sambor who never asked for anything in return. In late 1942 he brought them money and clothing to the ghetto from his Jewish friends in Silesia and on the way back smuggled their child (pictured) across the ghetto gate. His brother Feliks and both parents took care of the girl until the occupation ended. They gave her a Polish-sounding name Antośka for her safety, while the Schwarz' couple with Ehiel hid with other rescuers. In the meantime, Alojzy Plewa extended assistance to other Jews, including Jan and Anna Dziula. After the war, the Schwarz family settled in Israel. Plewa was recognized as the Righteous by Yad Vashem in November 1978.
- The Podgórski sisters: Stefania (16, now Burzminski) and Helena (6), hid 13 Jews for two and a half years in an attic in Przemyśl; Stefania married one of the rescued who later changed his name to Burzminski. Television film "Hidden in Silence" was made about this rescue mission
- Teresa Prekerowa and her family sheltered and provided aid to several Jews; after the war, she published several works on the topic of wartime rescue of Jews in Poland.
- Jan and Anna Puchalski and family hid 6 Jews at their house for 17 months in Łosośna

== R ==
- Franciszek Paweł Raszeja: Polish surgeon, murdered while providing medical aid in Warsaw Ghetto
- Regent family: The Regent family hid the family of Malwina and Roman Gross who had escaped from the Tarnopol Ghetto. Roman Gross, an attorney, had previously defended Józef Regent preventing his deportation to Siberia by the NKVD. The Regents received medals of the Righteous in 1995.
- Maria Rogowska-Falska, a Polish teacher who o hid several Jewish children
- Maria Roszak (Sister Cecylia) Dominican nun who together with Anna Borkowska (Sister Bertranda) sheltered Jews from Vilnius Ghetto
- Konrad Rudnicki and his mother Maria harbored the Weintraubs family during World War II

== S ==
- Schnitzer family: Józef Schnitzer and his family hid several Jews in their house and nearby shelters. The dug-outs for the Jews were often used by the Polish farmers themselves, whenever the OUN-UPA fighting squads were in the area. Józef was killed by the Germans in one of the local raids; the Jews he hid survived the war.
- Irena Sendler helped rescue at least 2,500 Jewish children from the Warsaw Ghetto
- Edward and Maria Seta from Dąbrówka, helped rescue 3 Jewish family members who escaped from the Warsaw Ghetto. Yad Vashem is looking for an offspring.
- Jadwiga Seta helped rescue a Jewish boy who escaped from the Warsaw Ghetto and later transferred him to her brother Edward Seta and his wife Maria..
- Sikora family: When the Hasag-Pelcery forced labour camp was liquidated ahead of the Soviet offensive in 1945, Stefan Sikora from the fire brigade with his son Jerzy and daughter Aleksandra, Polish Righteous from Częstochowa, rescued Kalman Chęciński, Zisla Cholozin née Blajwajs, and Bruria Bajski née Erlich from a death march heading for the heartland of Germany.
- Helena Sitkowska: In the autumn of 1942, Bronisława Kozak née Landau who was already widowed, fled the Częstochowa Ghetto ahead of Operation Reinhard, along with her two daughters, Hadassa (Wisia) and Marion (age 8). Helped by Polish villagers they journeyed to Warsaw, where the girls were placed in a Catholic convent temporarily. Just before the outbreak of the Warsaw Uprising all three were rescued by the Sitkowski family of widowed Helena Sitkowska recognized as the Righteous in 1995. The two families fled from Warsaw to the south of occupied Poland and luckily survived together thanks to ingenuity of both women, a Pole and a Jew.
- Michał and Jadwiga Skalski: In February 1943, Leon Grynberg with his daughter Halinka as well as Felicja and Jakub Wajsfeld, all from Białystok Ghetto, were saved by Michał and Jadwiga Skalski who lived on the Arian side with their 10 years old daughter. Felicja delivered a baby girl into Jadwiga's hands. Skalskis took in Fruma and Jankiel Rosen, and Aleksander Brener with his daughter Ida as well, seven people altogether. Most survived.
- Leon Śliwiński: Polish Righteous Leon Śliwiński, evicted by the Germans from his family home at Leśna Street in Kielce during the formation of the Kielce Ghetto, used to return in secrecy to sell bread and meats to ghettoised Jews. He met his friend Dawid (David) Friedman whose parents were already dead. David's caretaker, Mr. Rozenberg, asked Leon to save him; Leon was 14 years old, David was 12. They boarded the train to Daleszyce where Leon's parents stayed. David was given a new name as Zygmunt Śliwiński and taken in, as a "cousin" from Warsaw. All survived. David's sister and her Polish rescuers did not. She was smuggled out of the ghetto in the second round of the rescue attempts. However, the family who harboured her were caught and murdered by the German police. Friedman relocated to Kraków, then to Chrzanów, learned Yiddish, and emigrated to Israel in 1947. Forty-four years later in 1991, Leon's parents, Bolesław Śliwiński, who died in 1949, and Leonia Śliwińska née Berendt, who died in 1978, were bestowed titles of the Righteous in Israel. Leon Śliwiński received his title on 23 May 1993 in Warsaw. In 1996 David invited Leon to Israel. They were elated to see each other. When asked, why he risked his own life to rescue David, Leon replied, "I just wanted him to live. I knew that all others were being deported to their deaths." Leon Śliwiński died in Kielce on 12 February 2012.
- Henryk Sławik helped save over 5,000 Polish Jews in Budapest by giving them false 'arian' passports
- Jan and Władysława Smolko: Michael Turek and his brother Menachem escaped deportation from the Białystok Ghetto and reached the home of Jan and Władysława Smolko who already harbored the Goldzin family of four.
- Barbara and son Jerzy Szacki harboured a pregnant Ghetto fugitive with a 5-year-old, helped with the newborn
- Elzbieta Szyszkiewicz-Burda: Szyszkiewicz-Burda, alias Liza (a professional nurse), used to pull Jews off the street – and out of mortal danger – right into her home, which served as a safe-house and contact place for the Jewish partisan movement in the Białystok area.

== U ==
- Józef and Wiktoria Ulma from Markowa harbored 8 Jews, killed together with them, and their own 6 children by German police

== W ==
- Rudolf Weigl made and supplied vaccines to two Jewish ghettos, employed Jews in hiding
- Henryk Woliński (of AK BIP) helped Jews through his resistance and Żegota activities
- Paweł Zenon Woś together with his parents, Paweł and Anna, smuggled 12 Jews from the Warsaw Ghetto

== Z ==
- Jerzy Zagórski and wife Maria, harbored 18 Jews in their home before the Warsaw Uprising
- Jan Żabiński and wife Antonina sheltered hundreds of displaced Jews at their Warsaw Zoo
