= Celiński =

Celiński is a Polish surname. The feminine form of the name is Celińska. Notable people with the name include:

- Andrzej Celiński (born 1950), Polish politician
- Stanisława Celińska (1947–2026), Polish actress
- Zdzisław Celiński (1847–1929), Polish engineer
- Zofia Celińska (1919–2016), Polish economist
