= Idzikowski =

Idzikowski, feminine: Idzikowska is a Polish surname.

- Bolesław Idzikowski, Polish Righteous Among the Nations
- Ludwik Idzikowski (August 24, 1891 – July 13, 1929) was a Polish military aviator
- Stanislas Idzikowski (1894 – 12 February 1977) was a Polish dancer and ballet master
