= Sambor Ghetto =

Nazi ghetto in occupied Ukraine

Coordinates: 49.310°N 23.1210°E

- Sambor location during the Holocaust in Eastern Europe
- Location: Sambir, Western Ukraine
- Incident type: Imprisonment, slave labor, mass killings, deportations to death camps, extortion
- Organizations: SS; Schutzmannschaften
- Camp: Belzec (see map)
- Victims: Over 10,000 Jews

Sambor Ghetto (Polish: getto w Samborze, Ukrainian: Самбірське гето, Hebrew: גטו סמבור) was a Nazi ghetto established in March 1942 by the SS in Sambir, Western Ukraine. In the interwar period, the town (Sambor) had been part of the Second Polish Republic. In 1941, the Germans captured the town at the beginning of Operation Barbarossa. According to the Polish census of 1931, Jews constituted nearly 29 percent of the town's inhabitants, most of whom were murdered during the Holocaust. Sambor (Sambir) is not to be confused with the much smaller Old Sambor (Stary Sambor, now Staryi Sambir) located nearby, although the Jewish history of the two is inextricably linked.

== Background ==
When the Second Polish Republic was formed in 1918, both Sambor and Stary Sambor became seats of separate gminas. In 1932, the counties were combined into a single administrative area. The Jewish population grew steadily. Brand new schools, including a Jewish gymnasium and a Bais Yaakov for girls were established, as well as new industrial plants, unions, Jewish relief organizations, and several Zionist parties such as World Agudath Israel. Jews engaged in trade, crafts, carter, agriculture, and professional activities. Jewish cultural institutions included a large library and a sports club. On 8–11 September 1939, Sambor was overrun by the 1st Mountain Division of the Wehrmacht during the Polish Battle of Lwów. It was transferred to the Soviet Union in accordance with the German-Soviet Frontier Treaty signed on 28 September 1939.

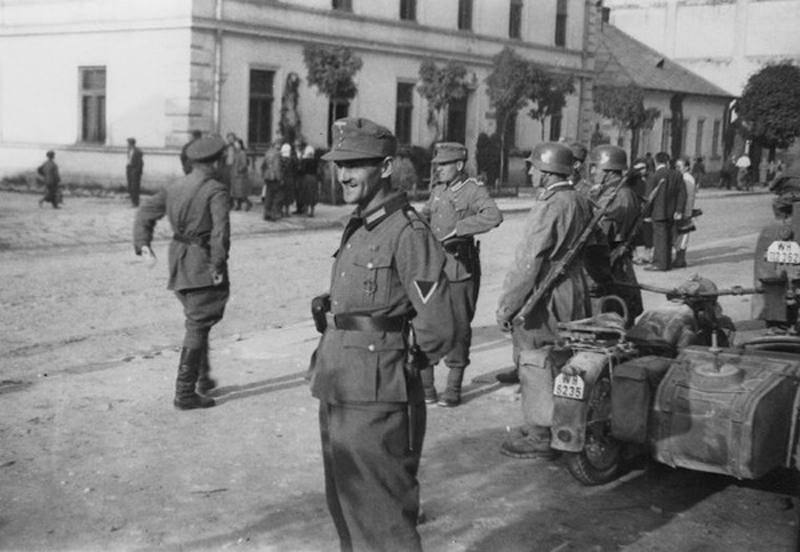
German and Soviet soldiers in Sambor after the 1939 invasion of Poland

After the Soviet takeover, wealthy and middle-class Polish Jews were arrested by the NKVD and sentenced for deportation to Siberia along with the Polish intelligentsia. Some pro-Soviet Jews were given government jobs. The economy was nationalized; hundreds of citizens were executed out of sight by the secret police as "enemies of the people". Sambor became part of the Drohobych Oblast on 4 December 1939.

On 22 June 1941, Germany invaded the Soviet Union in Operation Barbarossa. During the hasty evacuation of the political prison in Sambor, the NKVD shot 600 prisoners; 80 corpses were left unburied for lack of time. Sambor was taken over by the Wehrmacht on 29 June. The city became one of a dozen administrative units of the District of Galicia, the fifth district of the General Government, with the capital in Lemberg.

Arriving German troops were accompanied by Ukrainian task forces (pokhidny hrupy) indoctrinated at German training bases in the General Government. The OUN followers (Anwärters included) mobilized Ukrainian militants in some 30 locations at once, including in Sambor, and in accordance with the Nazi theory of Judeo-Bolshevism, launched retaliatory pogroms against the Polish Jews. The deadliest of them, overseen by SS-Brigadeführer Otto Rasch, took place in Lwów beginning 30 June 1941. On 1 July 1941, the Ukrainian nationalists killed approximately 50–100 Polish Jews in Sambor, but similar pogroms affected other Polish provincial capitals as far as Tarnopol, Stanisławów and Łuck.

== The ghetto ==
The German authorities forced all adult Jews to wear the yellow badge. In July 1941, a Judenrat was formed in Sambor on German orders, with Dr. Shimshon (Samson) Schneidscher as its chairman. In the following months, Jews were deported to the open-type ghetto in Sambor from the entire county. On 17 July, Heinrich Himmler decreed the formation of the Schutzmannschaften from among the local Ukrainians, owing to good relations with the local Ukrainian Hilfsverwaltung. By 7 August 1941, in most areas conquered by the Wehrmacht, units of the Ukrainian People's Militia had already participated in a series of so-called "self-purification" actions, followed closely by killings carried out by Einsatzgruppe C. The OUN-B militia spearheaded a day-long pogrom in Stary Sambor. Thirty-two prominent Jews were dragged by the nationalists to the cemetery and bludgeoned. Surviving eyewitnesses, Mrs. Levitski and Mr. Eidman, reported cases of dismemberment and decapitation. Afterwards, a Jewish Ghetto Police was set up, headed by Hermann Stahl. Jews were ordered to hand over their furs, radios, silver and gold.

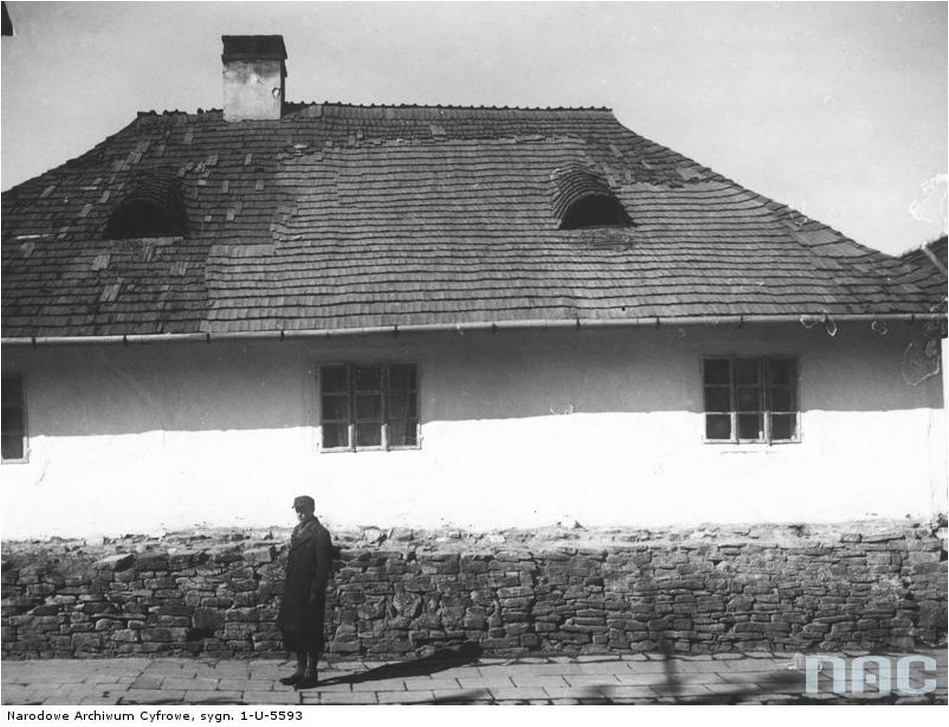
Tkacka Street in Sambor before the Holocaust in occupied Poland, c. 1939

Among the people trapped in the Sambor Ghetto were thousands of refugees who arrived there in an attempt to escape the German occupation of western Poland, and possibly cross the border to Romania and Hungary. Confined to the Blich neighbourhood of Sambor – the ghetto was sealed off from the outside on 12 January 1942,. Jews from different parts of the city, along with inhabitants of neighbouring communities, including Stary Sambor, were transferred to the ghetto until March 1942. A curfew was imposed, subject to shoot-on-sight enforcement.

== Deportations to death camps ==
In July 1942, the first killing centre of Operation Reinhard built by the SS at Belzec (just over 100 kilometres away) began its second phase of extermination, with brand new gas chambers built of brick. Sambor Jews were rounded up in stages. A terror operation was conducted in the ghetto on 2–4 August 1942 ahead of the first deportation. The 'resettlement' rail transports to Belzec left Sambor on 4–6 August 1942 under heavy guard, with 6,000 men, women, and children crammed into Holocaust trains without food or water. About 600 Jews were sent to the Janowska concentration camp nearby. The second set of trains with 3,000–4,000 Jews departed on 17–18 and 22 October 1942. On 17 November 1942, the depopulated ghetto was filled with expellees from Turka and Ilnik. Some Jews escaped to the forest. The town of Turka was declared Judenfrei on 1 December 1942. Irrespective of deportations, mass shootings of Jews were also carried out. In January 1943, the Germans and Ukrainian Auxiliary Police rounded up 1,500 Jews deemed 'unworthy of life'. They were trucked to the woods near Radlowicz (Radłowicze, Radlovitze; now Ralivka) and shot one by one. Among those still alive in the ghetto, death by starvation and typhus raged.

After the long winter, new terror operations in the ghetto took place in March or April 1943. The Gestapo utilized Wehrmacht units transiting through Sambor to round up Jews. All houses, cellars and even chimneys were searched. The 1,500 captives were split in groups of 100 each. They were escorted to the cemetery, where Jewish men were forced to dig mass graves. The liquidation of the ghetto was approaching. In June, Dr. Zausner, deputy to the Judenrat chairman, gave a speech full of hope because the Gestapo office in Drohobicz agreed to save a group of labourers in exchange for a huge ransom. Nevertheless, on the night of 8 June 1943, the Ukrainian Hilfspolizei set the ghetto houses on fire. In the morning, all Jewish slave labourers were escorted to prison, loaded onto lorries and trucked to the killing fields at Radłowicze. The ghetto was no more; the city was declared "Judenrein". The Soviet Red Army liberated Sambor a year later amid heavy fighting with the retreating Germans, around 7 August 1944.

Some Jews had managed to dig a tunnel leading to a sewer out of the ghetto and escaped to the partisans in the forest. A number of local gentiles aided some of the escapees. Those declared Righteous Among the Nations who helped Sambor Ghetto's Jews included the Plewa family, Celina Kędzierska, the Bońkowski family and the Oczyński family.

In 1943, the Nazi police executed at least 27 people in Sambor for attempting to hide Jews. Altogether, about 160 Jews survived, mostly by hiding with Poles and Ukrainians in the town or the surrounding countryside.

== Post-war ==
After the war, several members of the town's German civilian administration and security apparatus received prison sentences; others did not.

"During the Soviet era, the Jewish cemetery of Sambor lost its original function and was levelled. Plans were made to construct a sports field on the site." Since 1991, Sambir (Самбір) has been part of Ukraine. In 2000, attempts to preserve the site of the mass shootings for a Holocaust memorial park were halted. In 2019, a deal was reached with the local village to allow the memorial to be built.

== Seel also ==
- List of Polish Righteous Among the Nations
- List of Ukrainian Righteous Among the Nations
