= Kielce Ghetto =

Nazi ghetto in occupied Poland

Coordinates: 50.8731°N 20.6317°E

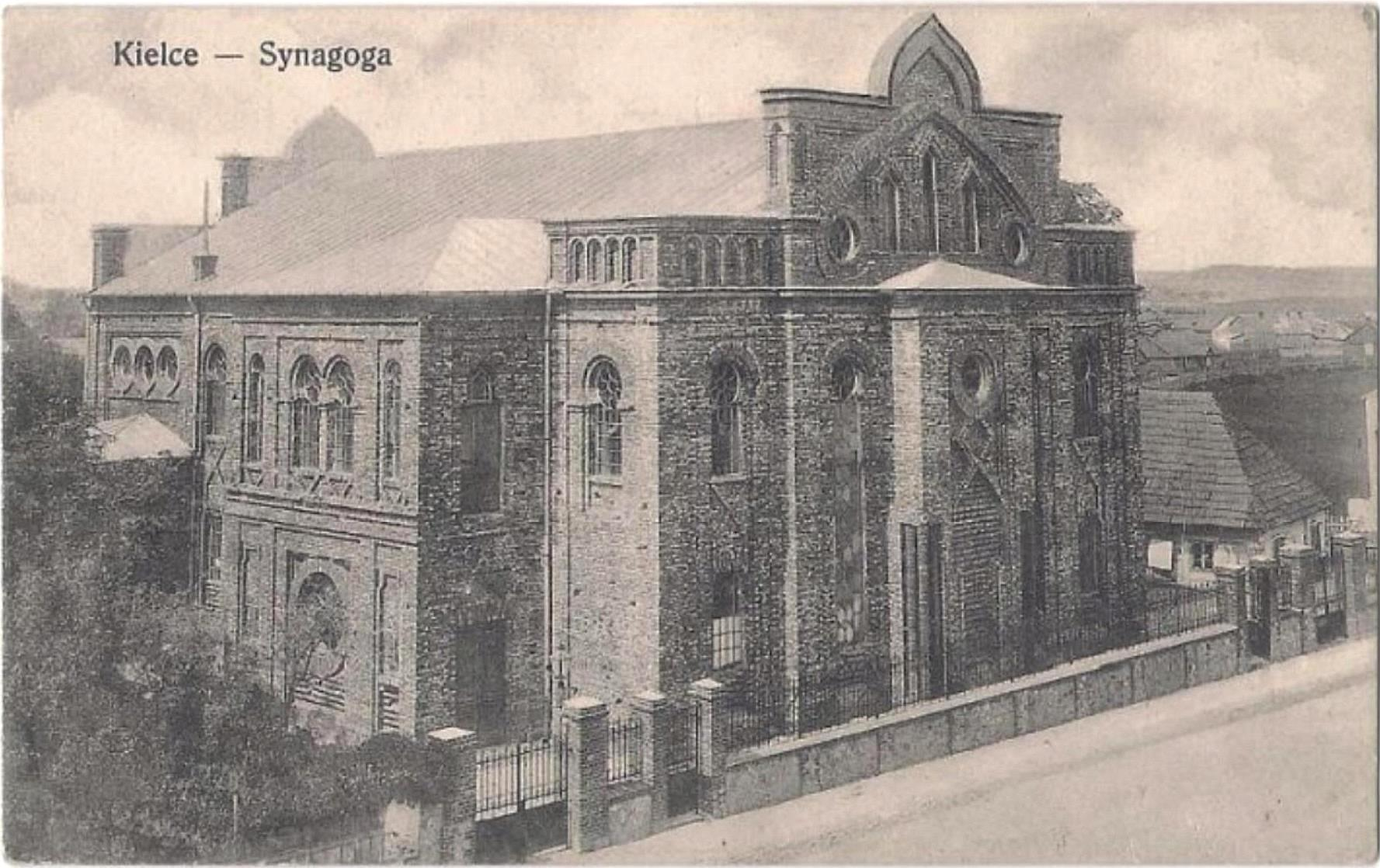
- Kielce Synagogue during the interwar period

- Kielce location during the Holocaust in Poland
- Location: Kielce, German-occupied Poland
- Incident type: Imprisonment, forced labor, starvation, mass killing
- Organizations: Schutzstaffel (SS)
- Camp: Treblinka (see map)
- Victims: 25,000 ghettoized Jews,

The Kielce Ghetto (Polish: getto w Kielcach, German: Ghetto von Kielce) was a Jewish World War II ghetto created in 1941 by the Schutzstaffel (SS) in the Polish city of Kielce in the south-western region of the Second Polish Republic, occupied by German forces from 4 September 1939. Before the Nazi invasion of Poland in 1939, Kielce was the capital of the Kielce Voivodeship. The Germans incorporated the city into Distrikt Radom of the semi-colonial General Government territory. The liquidation of the ghetto took place in August 1942, with over 21,000 victims (men, women and children) deported to their deaths at the Treblinka extermination camp, and several thousands more shot, face-to-face.

There was a considerable Jewish presence in Kielce. The Kehilla operated two synagogues, a beth midrash house of learning, a mikveh, the cemetery with ohalim, an orphanage, a retirement home, three elementary schools, two high schools, a Talmudic college and a large Tarbut library with 10,000 volumes. There were also numerous organizations and societies including two sports clubs. Nevertheless, the economic crisis of the 1930 prompted many younger Jews to emigrate before the war began, mostly to America.

== Ghetto history ==
On 4 September 1939, the city was bombed by the Luftwaffe and occupied by the German army on the following day. Kielce was made into a county seat of the newly formed Distrikt Radom governed by Dr. Karl Lasch appointed from Berlin on 26 October 1939. A month later, SS-Oberführer Fritz Katzmann – a notorious Holocaust perpetrator – took over policing of his district. As in all Polish cities incorporated into the Nazi German General Government territory, the new administration ordered the creation of a Judenrat in Kielce. It was headed by physician and former city counsellor Moshe (Moses) Pelc, fluent in German. On 1 December 1939 all Jews were ordered to wear a Star of David on their outer garments. At the same time, Jewish–owned factories were confiscated by the Gestapo, stores and shops along the main thoroughfares liquidated, and all wealthy houses plundered by the Nazi officials. The Grand Synagogue was emptied and turned into a storehouse with a holding cell. In January 1940 houses of Jewish prayer were made illegal.

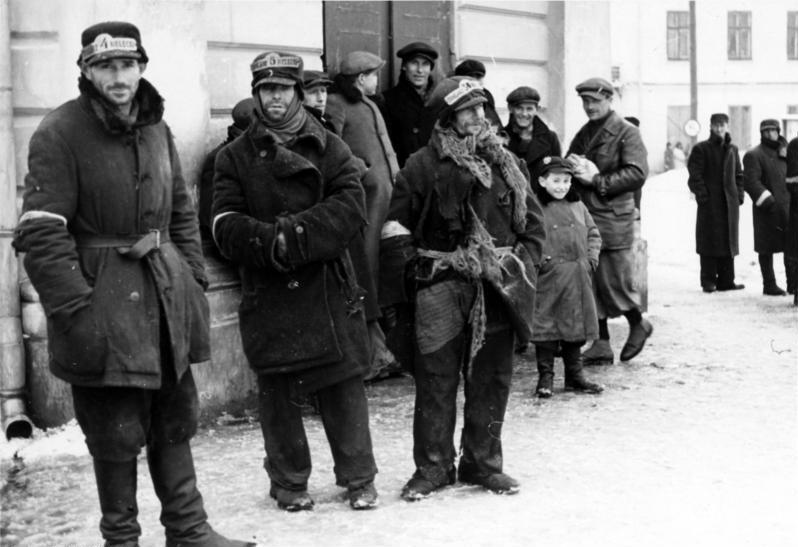
Kielce Jews in winter 1939, photographed by a Bahnhof officer

Between the onset of war in September 1939 and March 1940, the Jewish population of Kielce expanded from 18,000, to 25,400 (35% of all residents), with trains of dispossessed Jews arriving under the escort of Ordnungspolizei from the Polish areas annexed by Nazi Germany. Pelc and the Judenrat secured housing for them to the best of ability; soup kitchens were set up. Due to a typhus epidemic which erupted in early 1940, a new clinic opened.

Pelc used his Polish contacts to help Jewish families survive. The general Polish population was not separated from them as of yet. Also, the Judenrat received material help from the Kraków branch of the Jewish self-help organizations JSS and JDC. However, Pelc found himself unable to deal with the German ransom demands, and in August 1940 proposed that the industrialist Herman Lewi (Hermann Levy) become his successor. Pelc was dismissed, and a year later murdered on suspicion of "collaborating" with the Poles. Levy resumed his duties and imposed a heavier tax burden on the community. In October 1940 Hans Drechsel, age 36, was appointed mayor (Stadthauptmann) of Kielce. Drechsel had already successfully ghettoised 12,000 Jews in the occupied city of Piotrków Trybunalski, 98 kilometres (61 mi) distance.

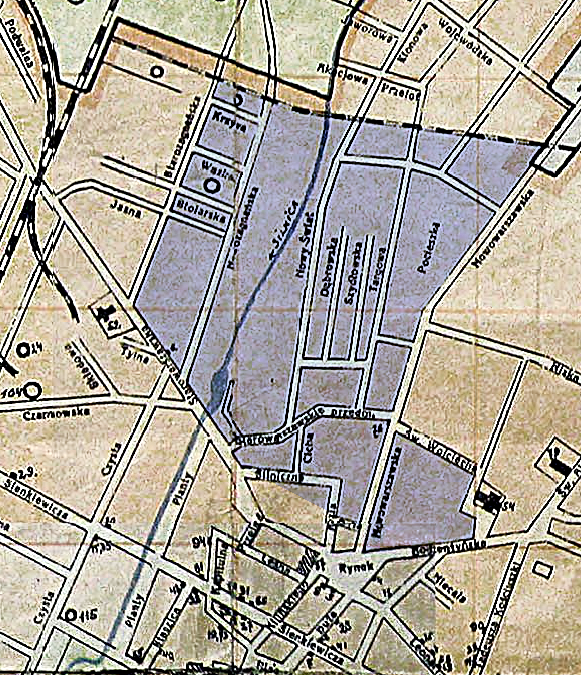
Map of the Kielce Ghetto, with the Silnica River running through it

On 31 March 1941, Reichsamtsleiter Lasch ordered the creation of the Kielce Ghetto surrounded by high fences, barbed wire, and guards. Drechsel brought in Police Battalion 305 to help out. The gentile Poles were ordered to vacate the area and the Jews were given one week to relocate. The ghetto was split in two, along Warszawska Street (Nowowarszawska) with the Silnica River (pl) running through it. The so-called large ghetto was set up between the streets of Orla, Piotrkowska, Pocieszka, and Warszawska to the east, and the smaller ghetto between Warszawska on the west, and the streets of Bodzentyńska, St. Wojciech, and the St. Wojciech square. The ghetto gates were closed on 5 April 1941; the Jewish Ghetto Police was formed with 85 members and ordered to guard it. Meanwhile, further expulsions elsewhere and deportations to Kielce continued until August 1942 at which time there were 27,000 prisoners crammed in the ghetto. Trains with Jewish families arrived from the entire Kielce Voivodeship, and also from Vienna, Poznań, and Łódź. The severe overcrowding, rampant hunger, and outbreaks of epidemic typhus took the lives of 4,000 people before mid-1942.

Several forced-labour enterprises were set up in the city by the SS, including Hasag Granat Werke with 400–500 Jews manufacturing munition, as well as the Ludwigshütte (prewar Ludwików foundry) with 200–300 slave labourers; the Henryków woodworking plant, and various workshops for German war economy. The Jews who worked in these factories were almost the only ones who survived the ghetto's liquidation, for two more years. The Jewish clandestine resistance, under the leadership of Dawid Barwiner (Bachwiener) and Gerszon Lewkowicz, attempted to procure weapons, but they were largely unsuccessful. The secret production of arms and ammunition for the planned uprising failed abruptly when the chief of Jewish police, Wahan Spiegl (Spiegel), informed the Gestapo on the goings-on in the German metal shops.

== Murder operations ==
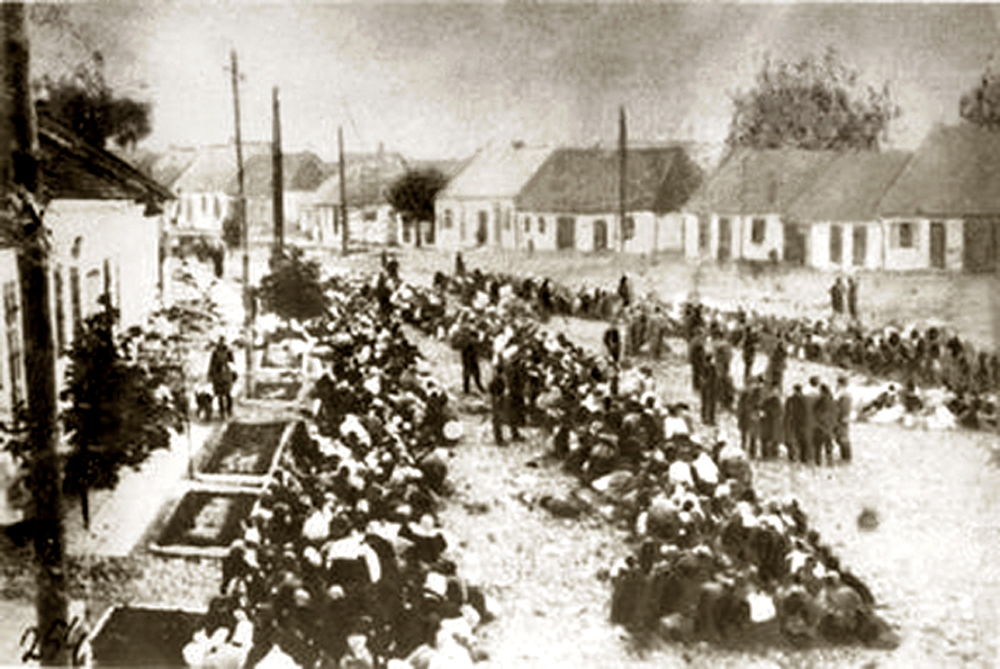
Liquidation of the Kielce Ghetto; roundup at Starowarszawska Street

The fate of ghettoised Jews across occupied Poland was sealed at Wannsee in early 1942, when the Final Solution was set in motion. The Kielce Ghetto was eradicated in three operations in the course of only five days as part of Operation Reinhard, which marked the deadliest phase of the Holocaust in occupied Poland. The first ghetto liquidation action took place on 20 August 1942. During roundups, all Jews unable to move were shot on the spot including the sick, the elderly, and the disabled. Around 6,000–7,000, mostly women and children, were herded onto Okrzei Street and transported to Treblinka extermination camp. Within four days, 1,200 people including patients of the Jewish hospital were shot face-to-face and 20,000–21,000 Jews were led into waiting Holocaust trains, sent to Treblinka, and murdered in the gas chambers. By the end of 24 August 1942, there were only 2,000 people left in the ghetto.

All surviving Jewish skilled workers were lodged in the labour camp at Stolarska and Jasna Street (pl) within the small ghetto, including members of the Judenrat, Levy with his family, and the Jewish policemen. The Holocaust survivor, Adam Helfand, forced along with a group of Jewish men to collect corpses of prisoners massacred during the ghetto liquidation, took part in the digging of mass graves at the Jewish cemetery. Helfand remembered stripping the bodies naked before burial on German orders and witnessed the terrorized Jews yanking gold teeth from the mouths of cadavers on pain of death.

The labour camp functioned for several more months, supplying slave labour to German factories that were still running. In May 1943, some Jewish prisoners from Kielce were taken to forced-labour camps in Starachowice, Skarżysko-Kamienna, Pionki, and Bliżyn. On 23 May 1943, the German police collected 45 Jewish children who had stayed behind at the liquidated camp. They were brought to the Pakosz Cemetery and shot. Their ages ranged from 15 months to 15 years. In September 1943, as the Soviet front advanced westward, what remained of the Kielce slave labour facilities was gradually abandoned. The remaining skilled workers were sent to the Auschwitz complex and further to Buchenwald, including future Canadian artist Gershon Iskowitz. The Soviet Red Army rolled into Kielce on 15 January 1945. The once-vibrant Jewish community that existed in Kielce since the mid-1800s was all but wiped out.

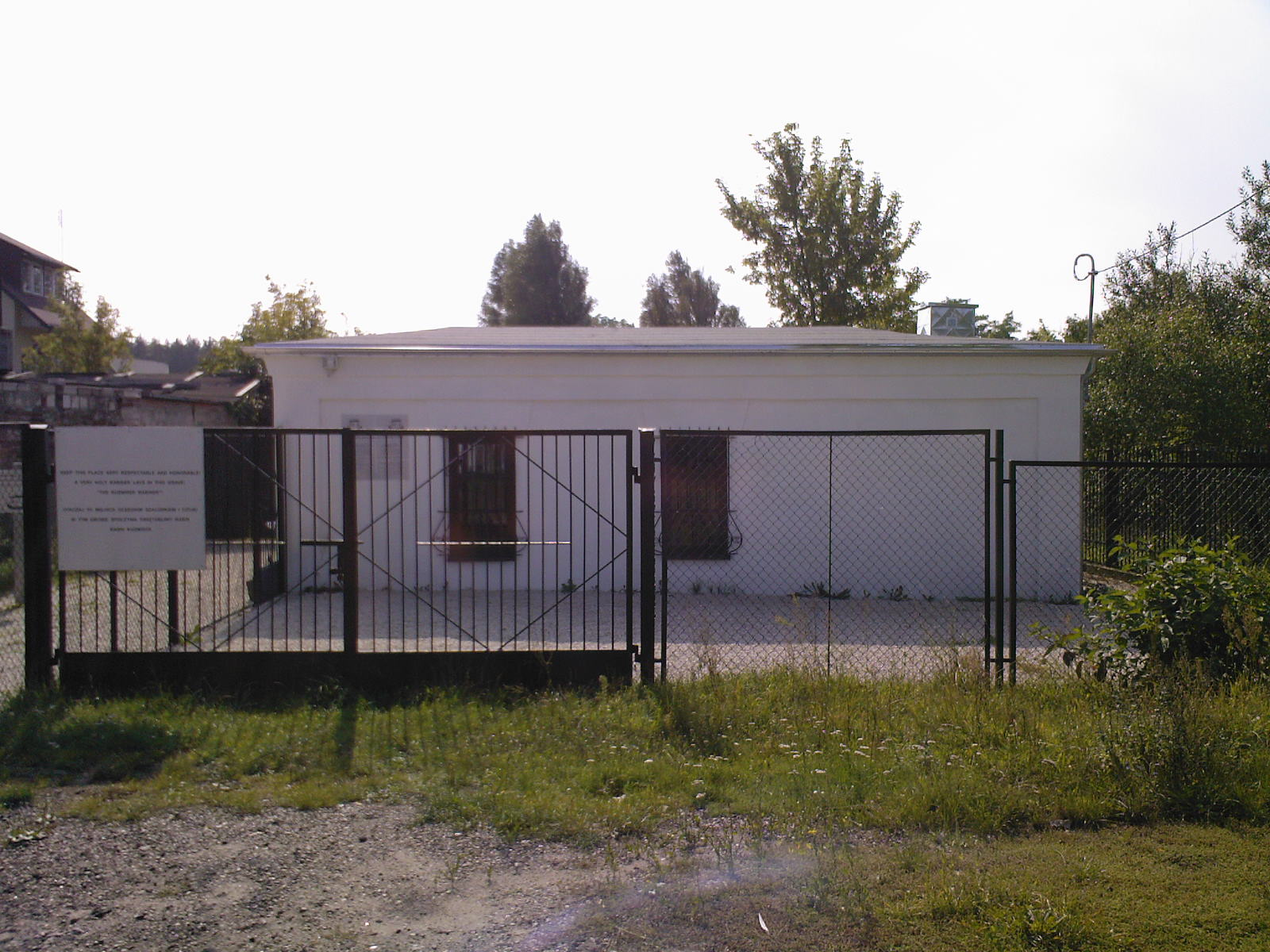
Kielce Ohel of Rabbi Mordechai Kuzmirer (Motele Twersky), great-grandson of Rabbi Mordechai Twersky, the Maggid of Chernobyl dynasty

During the ghetto liquidation, there were a number of Jewish escapes, as well as rescue attempts by local Polish gentiles. Several Jews who escaped the ghetto were sheltered by Stefan Sawa in the village Zagórze near Daleszyce. Polish Home Army soldiers of the "Wybraniecki" unit, commanded by Marian Sołtysiak ("Barabasz"), murdered the hiding Jews and Sawa. Six Jewish victims are known by name, but more than ten were probably murdered. Sawa was posthumously awarded a Righteous Among the Nations medal. Other righteous who helped Kielce Ghetto's Jews include Bolesław Idzikowski, and the Śliwiński family. Yad Vashem Righteous database lists several dozens of Righteous involved with the rescues in the Kielce region.

== Post war ==
Kielce was the site of the Kielce pogrom of 4 July 1946 in which 37 (40) Polish Jews (17–21 of whom remain unidentified) and 2 ethnic Poles were murdered, including 11 fatally shot with military assault rifles and 11 more stabbed with bayonets, indicating direct involvement of the Stalinist troops (according to the official findings of the Institute of National Remembrance).

In 2007 a monument commemorating the liquidation of the ghetto and the destruction of the city's Jewish community was unveiled in Kielce. A menorah-shaped monument, half-sunk in the ground, was designed by artist Marek Cecula who is also a Kielce-born Holocaust survivor.
