= Jewish Cemetery, Kielce =

Cemetery in Kielce

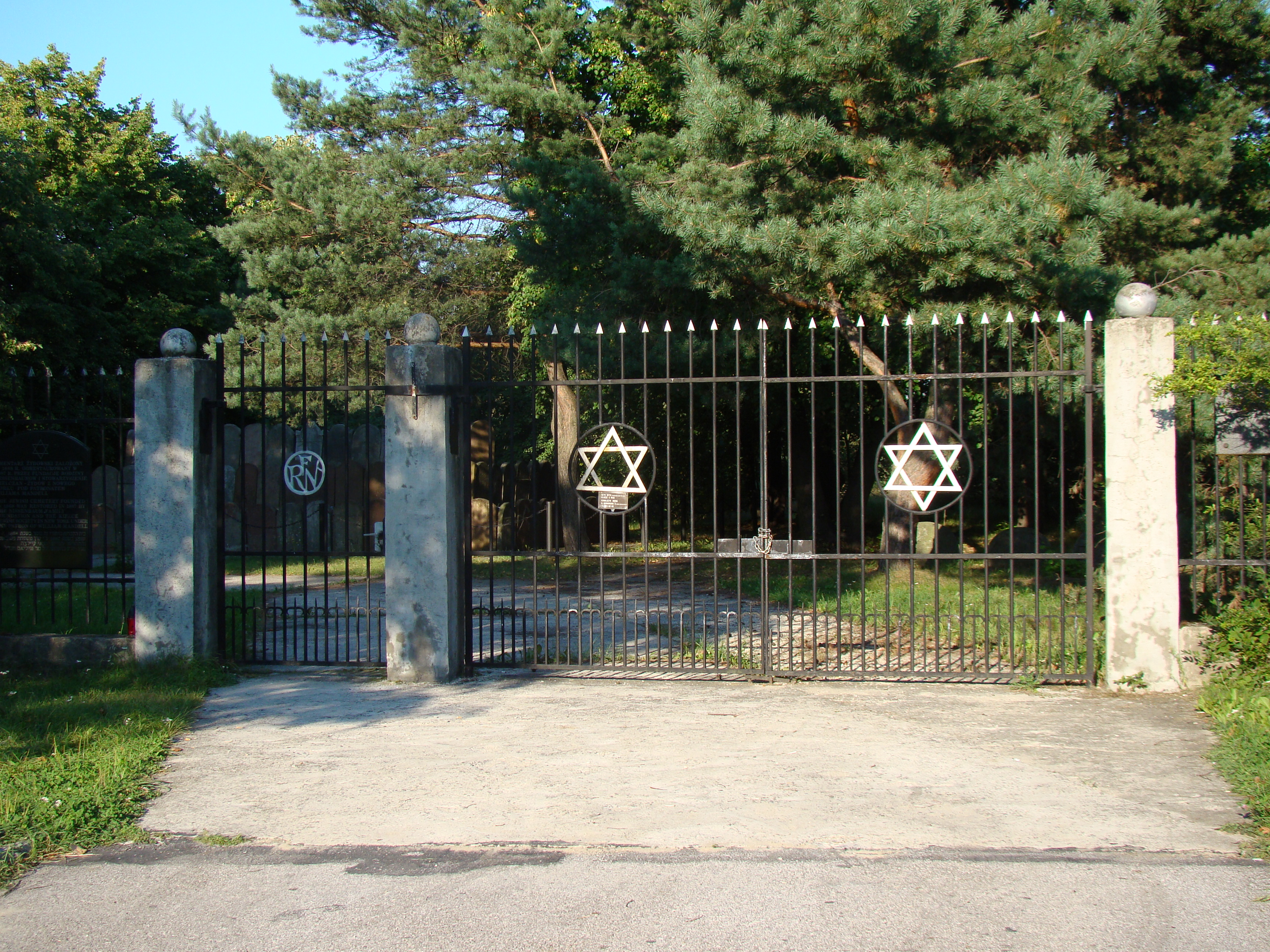
Entrance gate to Jewish Cemetery in Kielce

The Jewish Cemetery (also known as the Pakosz Cemetery) is located in the Pakosz District of Kielce, Poland, at the intersections of Pakosz Dolny and Kusocińskiego Streets. It has an area of 3.12 hectares. There are about 330 tombstones saved and preserved inside the necropolis, of which about 150 are arranged in the form of a lapidary monument. The cemetery is closed to visitors without special permit.

== History ==
The cemetery was founded in 1868 based on design by architect Franciszek Ksawery Kowalski. During World War II the cemetery was devastated by Nazi Germans. It was a place of regular mass executions of Poles and Jews. Notably, on 23 May 1943, the German paramilitary police murdered 45 Jewish children there, aged 15 months to 15 years.

In 1946, the cemetery became a place of burial of 40 Jewish victims of the Kielce pogrom. In subsequent years, the bodies of victims of massacres committed by Nazi Germans inside the Kielce Ghetto during the Holocaust in occupied Poland were exhumed from the banks of the Silnica River and transferred to the cemetery. In 1965 the cemetery was declared a monument and closed for further burials.
