= Janina Buchholtz-Bukolska =

Polish psychologist (d. 1969)

Janina Bucholc-Bukolska
- Born: Janina Katarzyna Buchholtz; 30 April 1893; Skąpe, Congress Poland
- Died: 26 July 1969 (aged 76); Wrocław, Poland
- Occupations: Translator, psychologist

Janina Bukolska (30 April 1893 – 26 July 1969) was a Polish translator and psychologist, and a member of Żegota during World War II.

== Biography ==
Bukolska was born Janina Katarzyna Bucholtz in 30 April, 1893 in Skąpe. She worked as a psychologist and as a translator at a notary office in Warsaw during the occupation of Poland during World War II. In addition to German, she was a certified translator of French and English. There she assisted the Jewish National Council and Żegota with falsifying documents, such as Aryan papers and birth certificates, to hide many Jews from the holocaust until the liquidation of the Warsaw Ghetto. In addition to falsifying documents, she also aided in finding hiding locations for Jews in the 'Aryan Sector' of Warsaw. Amongst those she assisted was hiding Jewish sculptor Magdalena Gross with the Rendzner family.

== Honors ==
Adolf Berman, member of the Jewish resistance in the ghetto, noted her tireless effort to assist with the rescue of Jews during the holocaust. In 1963 she was awarded the Order of Polonia Restituta, and in 1965, she was honored amongst the Righteous Among Nations.

== See also ==
- List of Polish Righteous Among the Nations
- Rescue of Jews by Poles during the Holocaust
