= Kielce cemetery massacre =

1943 mass murder of Jewish children by Nazi Germany

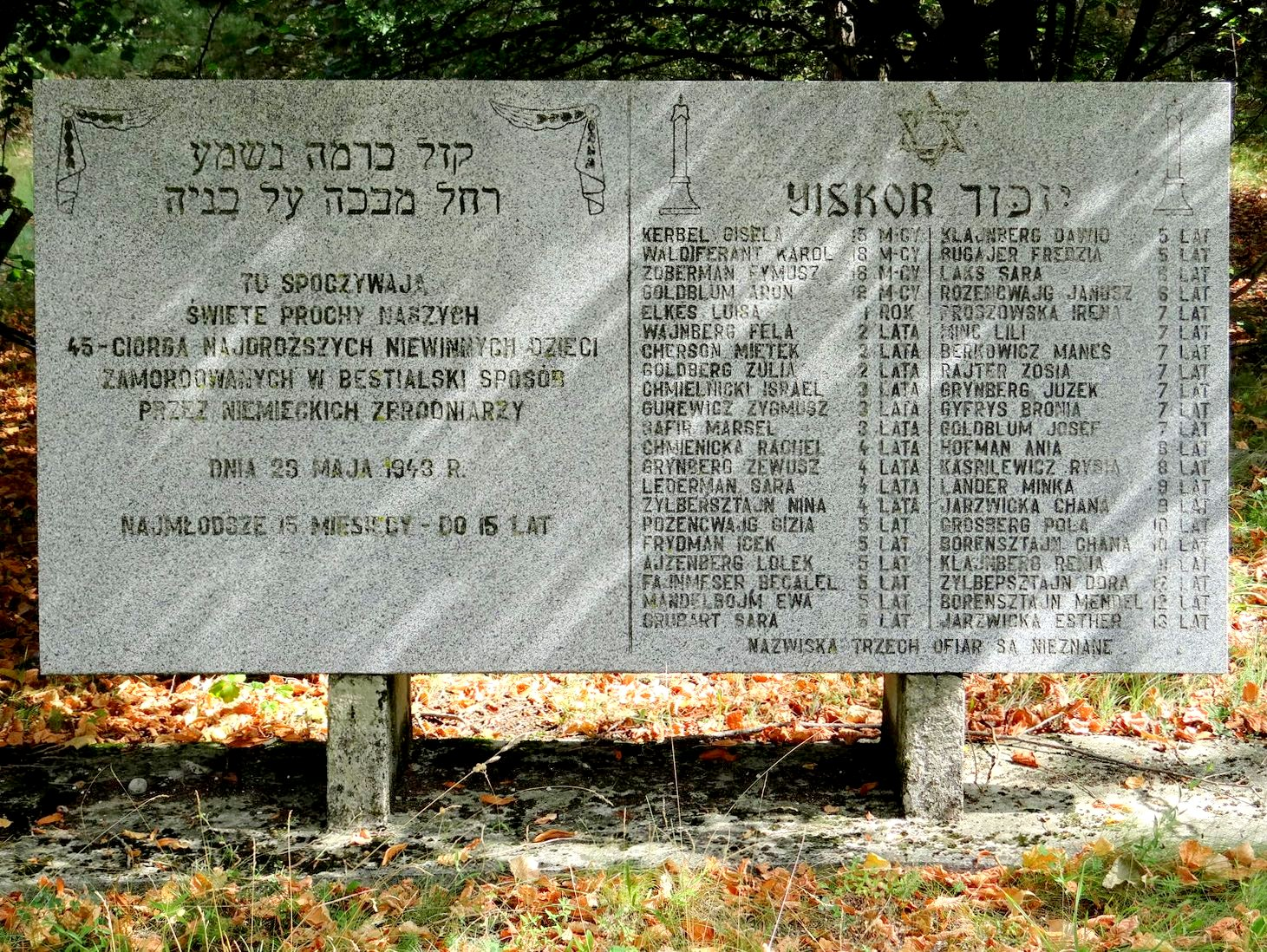
Memorial to the murdered children at the Pakosz Cemetery in Kielce, Poland.

The Kielce cemetery massacre refers to the shooting action by the Nazi German police that took place on May 23, 1943 in occupied Poland during World War II, in which 45 Jewish children who had survived the Kielce Ghetto liquidation, and remained with their working parents at the Kielce forced-labour camps, were rounded up and brought to the Pakosz cemetery in Kielce, Poland, where they were murdered by the German paramilitary police. The children ranged in age from 15 months to 15 years old.

During the ghetto liquidation action, which began on 20 August 1942, 20,000–21,000 Jews were taken to Holocaust trains and sent to the Treblinka extermination camp. By the end of 24 August 1942, there were only 2,000 skilled workers left in the labour camp at Stolarska-and-Jasna Streets (pl) within the small ghetto. These included members of the Judenrat and the Jewish policemen. In May 1943, most Jewish prisoners from Kielce were transported to forced-labour camps in Starachowice, Skarżysko-Kamienna, Pionki, and Bliżyn. The 45 Jewish children murdered at the cemetery were the ones who stayed behind at the liquidated camp.
