= Michał Lityński =

Polish physician (1906–1989)

- Born: 14 June 1906; Łódź, Partitioned Poland
- Died: 5 March 1989 (aged 82); Warsaw, Poland
- Education: University of Warsaw
- Occupation: Interniist
- Honours: Righteous Among the Nations

Michał Lityński (14 June 1906 - 5 March 1989) was a Polish physician and righteous Among the Nations. According to Eugeniusz Józef Kucharz, in 1953, two years before Jerome W. Conn, he authored the first description primary aldosteronism.

== Biography ==
He studied medicine at the University of Warsaw in the years 1925-1931 as an officer cadet of the Military Medical Center (Centrum Wyszkolenia Sanitarnego). He completed his internship in Warsaw. Since November 1932 till March 1936 he worked as a military physician in Toruń. In 1936 he became the head of the internal medicine department in the Military Medical Center in Warsaw. After the outbreak of World War II he became the Military Hospital commander in Garwolin, then he came back to Warsaw and took his old position. He joined the Home Army. On his department he hid wounded resistants and Jews escaped from the Warsaw Ghetto. During the Warsaw Uprising he organized an infirmary in the city centre, then he treated partisans in Puszcza Mariańska. After the war he worked shortly in Gdańsk, in 1946 he came back to Warsaw and became the head of the tuberculosis institute in the Szpital Wolski.

In 1986 he was bestowed the title of "Righteous Among the Nations".
