= Andrzej Garbuliński =

Polish farmer and Resistance member

Andrzej Garbuliński was a Polish farmer who lived in the village of Czerna with his family – Władysław, Eleonora, Marian, Helena, Kunegunda, Stanisław, Kazimierz, and Jan – during the Nazi German occupation of Poland in World War II. He and his eldest son Władysław, as well as neighbour Stanisław Owca, were executed by the Nazis in late 1943 for aiding and sheltering Jews.

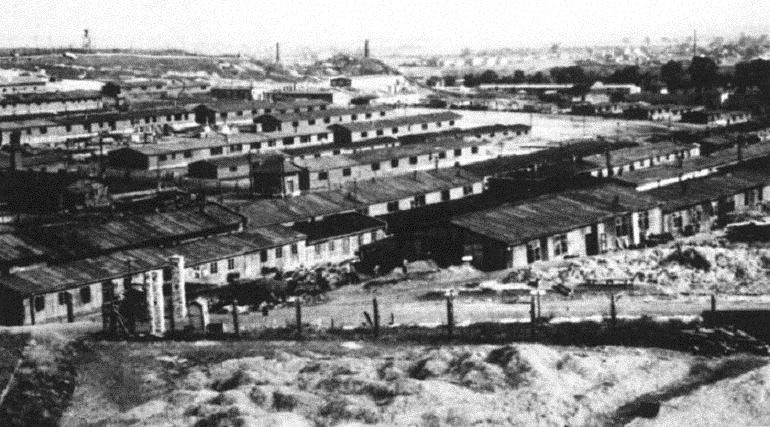
Płaszów camp

In 1940, Sarah Alfenbein, her daughter Hanna and son Meir (a neighboring Jewish family from the same village of Czerna) escaped from the Płaszów concentration camp and asked the Garbulińskis for help and shelter. Before arriving at the farm, they hid at the nearby home of Stanisław Owce. The Garbulinskis took the Jews in, and cared for them for the next two years.

In late 1943, the Gestapo gendarmerie came to the village. As they headed for the farm, Andrzej Garbuliński asked the Alfenbeins to run. However, they were spotted in a field while escaping. The mother and son were killed on the spot. The daughter Hanna managed to keep running, chased by the Germans, until she too was murdered. Andrzej Garbuliński and his son Władysław were immediately arrested and taken to the Jasło prison. The father was sentenced to death and executed there. Władysław was transferred to a separate prison where he was also killed. Eleonora, Helena, Kunegunda, Marian, Stanisław, Kazimierz and Jan Garbuliński survived the war.

In 1997, the Garbuliński family and Stanisław Owca were recognized as Righteous Among the Nations by Yad Vashem in Jerusalem for their daring attempt at saving a Jewish family from the Holocaust; Andrzej and Władysław, for giving their lives in the process.
