= Wanda Makuch-Korulska =

Polish neurologist

Prof. Wanda Makuch-Korulska
- Born: 1919
- Died: 2007 (aged 87–88)
- Education: University of Warsaw
- Occupation: neurologist
- Employer: Medical Academy of Warsaw
- Honours: Righteous Among the Nations

Wanda Makuch-Korulska (1919–2007) was a Polish medical doctor, specialist in neurology. Member of the Armia Krajowa Polish resistance during World War II; received the Righteous Among the Nations in 1995.

During World War II she helped a Jewish friend escape the Warsaw Ghetto and arranged a shelter for her afterwards.

== Scientific papers ==
- "Dystonia in multiple sclerosis," 1992, Polish
- "Somatosensory evoked potentials (SSEP) in patients with multiple sclerosis (MS)," 1989, Polish
- "Decaris in the treatment of multiple sclerosis," 1984, Polish
- "Influence of Tolseram on muscle tone," 1970, Polish
- "Immunoelectrophoretic examinations of serum proteins in patients with multiple sclerosis," 1970, Polish
