= Julia Pępiak =

Polish Righteous Among the Nations (1890–1971)

- Born: 21 September 1890; Bełżec, Poland
- Died: 17 March 1971 (aged 80); Śródborów (Otwock), Poland
- Known for: Holocaust rescue
- Honours: Righteous Among the Nations

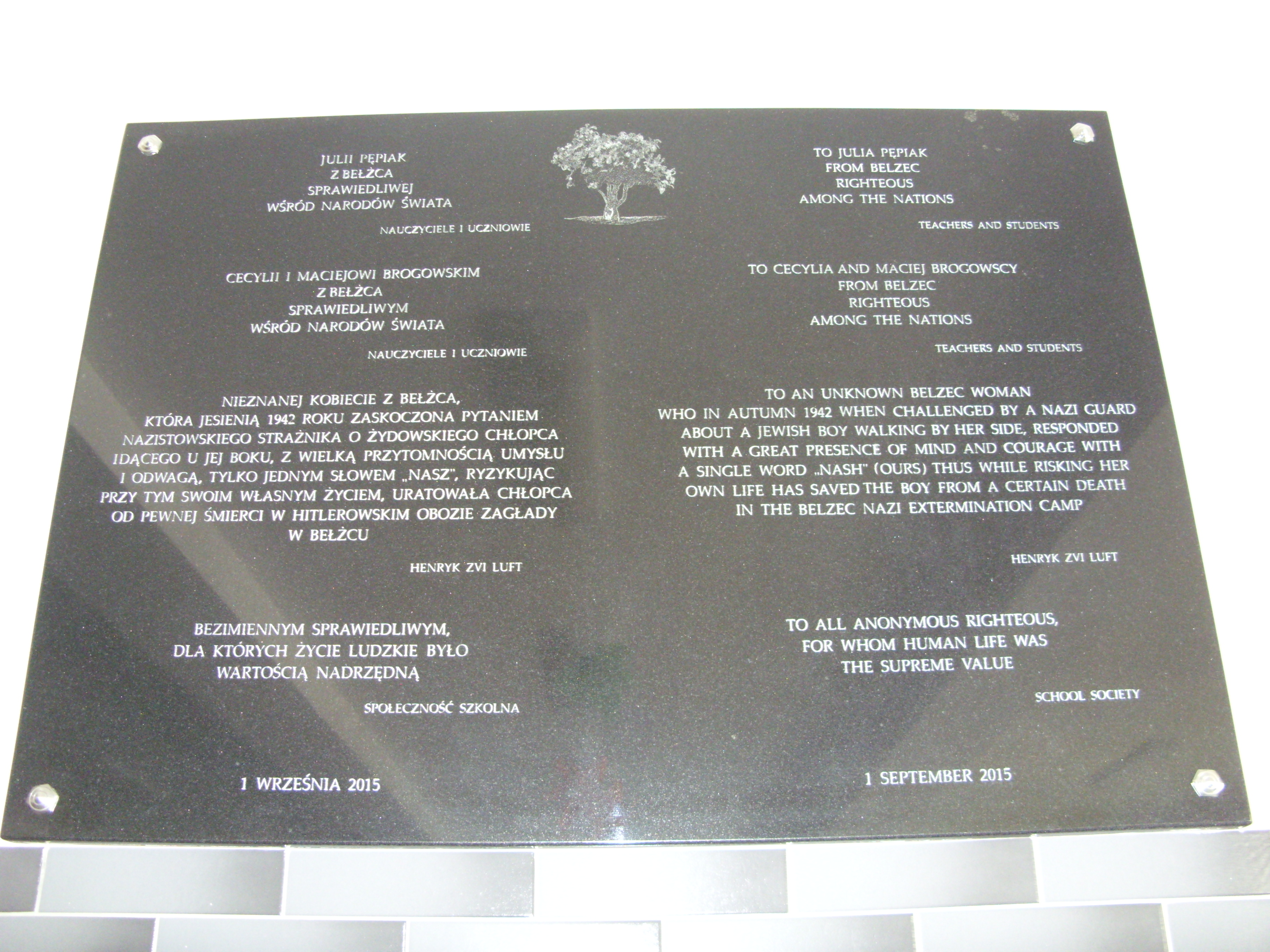
Julia Pępiak and Righteous Among the Nations from Bełżec, plaque in school

Julia Pępiak (21 September 1890 – 17 March 1971) was a Polish woman born in Bełżec. She is one of the Righteous Among the Nations.

== Life ==
During World War II and the German occupation in Poland, for three years (from 1941) until liberation, she hid in Bełżec Jewish women: Salomea Helman and her daughter Bronia. After the Second World War, those rescued left Poland for Israel.

On December 27, 1999, Julia Pępiak received the title of Righteous Among the Nations awarded by Yad Vashem in Jerusalem. She was buried at the Bródno Cemetery in Warsaw.

Her son Zygmunt Pępiak became a Catholic priest, Franciscan, father Sebastian.

She is the main protagonist in the book "Righteous from Bełżec" by Antoni Madejski.

== See also ==
- Cecylia and Maciej Brogowski
- German Nazi extermination camp SS-Sonderkommando Belzec in Bełżec
- German retribution against Poles who helped Jews
- Irena Sendler
- Polish Righteous Among the Nations
- Rescue of Jews by Poles during the Holocaust
