= Szczepan Bradło =

Polish Righteous Among the Nations

Szczepan Bradło (died 1960) was a Polish farmer who lived in Lubcza, a village in Tarnów Voivodeship, with his wife Klara (d. 1953), daughter Franciszka and sons: Antoni, Eugeniusz and Tadeusz. Together, they saved thirteen Jews during the Holocaust in German-occupied Poland. In 1986, the Bradło family were awarded the honorary title Righteous Among the Nations. Szczepan and his wife were recognized posthumously.

During World War II, Bradło lived on a three-hectare farm. According to the Yad Vashem deposition, two Jews from Slotowa who were forced to leave their hideout at the home of a peasant named Ryba asked Bradło for shelter for themselves and their families. Their families consisted of six Bochners, three Reichs, Izrael Hamel, Abraham Einspruch, and Bochna and Beniamin Dereszewicz. With the aid of the Bradłos, the families created a dugout in which they spent over two years, until the end of the war. According to the testimony of one of the survivors who, in the words of Gustavo Jalife, performed the "patient and agonizing count", this amounted to 26 months, 10 days and eight hours. Franciszka aided the refugees by cooking for all of them. Although poor, the Bradło family shared what they had.

All thirteen refugees survived the war, five of whom signed the deposition through which the Righteous Among the Nations title was bestowed on the Bradło family including Szczepan, Klara, their three sons and daughter Franciszka Bradło-Kozioł.

Antoni Bradło became a priest and for many years rendered his services in Argentina.

== See also ==
- The Jews of Tarnów
