= Zdzisław Celiński =

Polish engineer

Zdzisław Celiński (1847–1929) was a Polish engineer.

Celinski took part in the January Uprising. He arrived in Argentina in 1895. He was a constructor of the railway Buenos Aires - Santa Fe and of the port of Gualeguaychú on the Uruguay River. For the construction of the port Celiński received golden medal from the Argentinian government. He then worked on hydrographic studies and electrification using hydropower. In the late 19th and early 20th centuries, he led a scientific expedition to the Gran Chaco region for future colonization.
