= Cecylia and Maciej Brogowski =

Polish married couple, recognized as Righteous Among the Nations

- Honours: Righteous Among the Nations

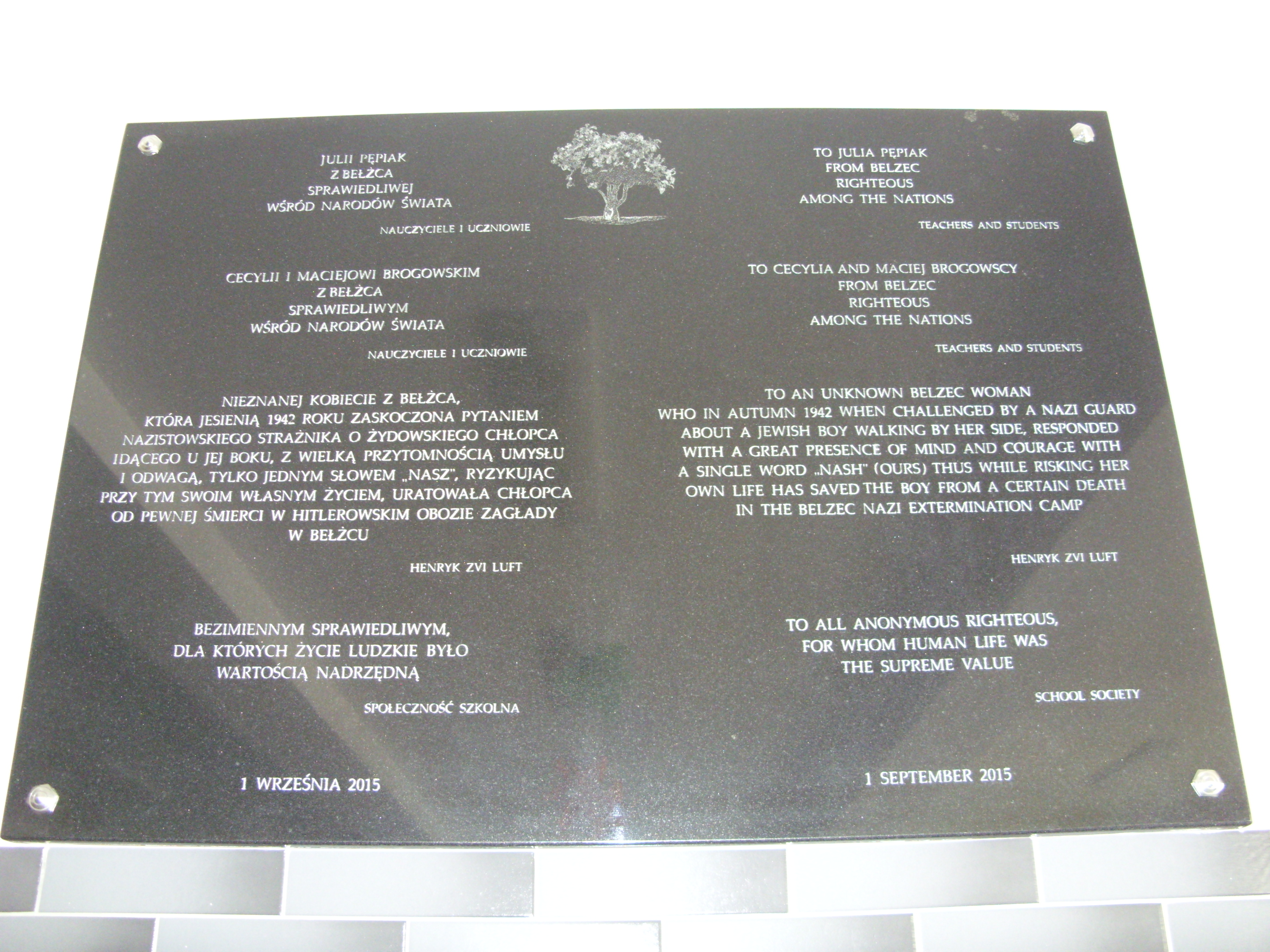
Cecylia and Maciej Brogowski and Righteous Among the Nations from Bełżec, plaque in school

Cecylia (1905–1980) and Maciej Brogowski (1902–1955) were a Polish Catholic couple, recognised as Righteous Among the Nations by Yad Vashem for having sheltered a Jewish girl named Irena Sznycer in their village of Bełżec during the German occupation in Poland in World War II.

== The Brogowski family ==
During World War II and the German occupation in Poland, Cecylia and Maciej Brogowski and their three children lived in the village of Bełżec. The Belzec extermination camp was located near the village. The Brogowskis could see Jews being taken to the camp, and see the smoke from the crematoria being operated at the camp.

Maciej Brogowski's sister, Ksawera Brogowska, worked as a housekeeper in Warsaw.

== Rescue of Irena Sznycer ==
During World War II and the German occupation in Poland, from 1941 until the liberation in 1945, Cecylia and Maciej Brogowski hid a young Jewish girl called Irena Sznycer from the German Gestapo.

Sznycer was born in Kraków. Around six years old, she was brought to Warsaw by her mother, who asked her relatives to shelter the girl. Her parents and her older sisters were arrested around that time, and were murdered in the Holocaust. Her relatives were in hiding, and feared that Sznycer's Jewish appearance would endanger them. They concluded that they could not take care of her. After a failed attempt to send her to an orphanage, they arranged for her to be moved from Warsaw to the village of Bełżec.

Sznycer traveled to Bełżec with Polish housekeeper Ksawera Brogowska and her friend Maria Leszczyńska. All three were taken in by Brogowska's brother Maciej Brogowski and his wife Cecylia. Cecylia and Maciej Brogowski sheltered Sznycer from 1941, when she was around six years old, until Poland was liberated in 1945. The Brogowskis had three children of their own at the time, the youngest of whom, Marysia or Maria, was the same age as Sznycer. Sznycer was treated as one of the family. She helped them in the fields and shared a bed with Maria. Maria and Sznycer became extremely close.

The Brogowskis found sheltering Sznycer challenging especially because the village was so close to the Belzec extermination camp. Their children helped protect Sznycer, comforting her and staying with her in a root cellar when she had to hide to avoid Nazi patrols. When she was not able to hide, the Brogowskis referred to her as their niece. On one occasion Sznycer was identified as Jewish, but the family was able to distract the accuser with food and alcohol. After this the Brogowskis had Sznycer baptized, in hopes of protecting her.

== Postwar ==
After World War II, Sznycer spent several years in a Bund orphanage. In 1949, she moved to a kibbutz in Israel with other displaced youths. Years later, the parties tried to reconnect, but Sznycer had forgotten the surname of the Polish family.

One of the Brogowskis' children, now Maria Jurczak, posted an advertisement in a newspaper with a photograph of Sznycer. This was identified by a friend of Sznycer who brought them together. Sznycer (now known as Rina Feinmesser) met Maria in 2007. By that time, nearly six decades later, the Brogowski parents who had sheltered her had died.

The Brogowskis were posthumously awarded the title of Righteous Among the Nations by Yad Vashem in Jerusalem in 2006 (or 2008; sources vary), which was received by their daughter Maria.

== See also ==
- Julia Pępiak
- German Nazi extermination camp SS-Sonderkommando Belzec in Bełżec
- German retribution against Poles who helped Jews
- Irena Sendler
- Polish Righteous Among the Nations
- Rescue of Jews by Poles during the Holocaust
