= Zofia Celińska =

Polish economist (1919–2016)

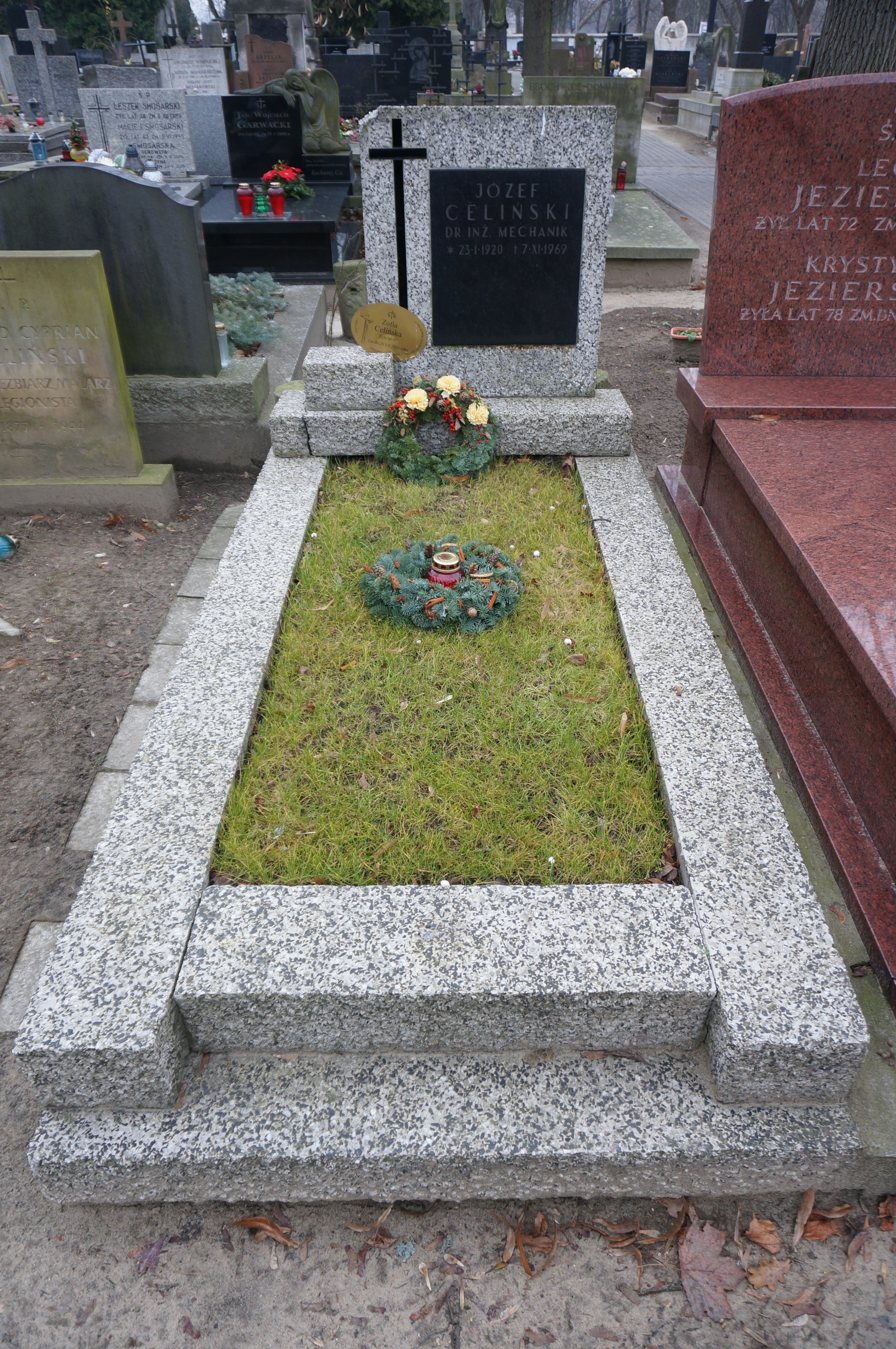
- Grave of Zofia Celińska in Warsaw
- Born: 8 July 1919; Warsaw
- Died: 28 July 2016 (aged 97); Wyszogród
- Occupation: Economist
- Awards: Righteous Among the Nations; Order of Polonia Restituta

Zofia Celińska (8 July 1919 — 28 July 2016) was a Polish economist. She was a member of the Home Army during World War II, and worked as an economist after the war. For her assistance in hiding Jewish friends and their family members during the occupation of Poland, she was recognized as Righteous Among the Nations and received the Commander's Cross of the Order of Polonia Restituta.

== Life and career ==
Celińska was born on 8 July 1919 in Warsaw.

During World War II, she was active in the Home Army. At the age of 20, she distributed the underground pamphlet Biuletyn Informacyjny. During the occupation of Poland, she assisted in hiding her Jewish friend Zofia Lewinówna and some of Lewinówna's family members for a year in her house. She also helped her friend Ola Zweibaum to enable some of her family members to escape from the Warsaw Ghetto.

After the war, Celińska attended the SGH Warsaw School of Economics, and graduated with a degree in economics. She worked as an economist in the Biuro Projektów i Studia Budownictwa Specjalnej.

Celińska was named Righteous Among the Nations in 2001. In 2009, she was awarded the Commander's Cross of the Order of Polonia Restituta.

Celińska died on 28 July 2016 in Wyszogród.
