= List of American films of 2002 =

This is a list of American films released in 2002.

== Box office ==
The highest-grossing American films released in 2002, by domestic box office gross revenue, are as follows:

Highest-grossing films of 2002
Rank	Title	Distributor	Domestic gross
1	Spider-Man	Sony Pictures	$403,706,375
2	The Lord of the Rings: The Two Towers	New Line Cinema	$339,789,881
3	Star Wars: Episode II – Attack of the Clones	20th Century Fox	$302,191,252
4	Harry Potter and the Chamber of Secrets	Warner Bros. Pictures	$261,988,482
5	My Big Fat Greek Wedding	IFC Films	$241,438,208
6	Signs	Disney	$227,966,634
7	Austin Powers in Goldmember	New Line Cinema	$213,307,889
8	Men in Black II	Sony Pictures	$190,418,803
9	Ice Age	20th Century Fox	$176,387,405
10	Chicago	Miramax	$170,687,518

== January–March ==
Opening		Title	Production company	Cast and crew	Ref.
J A N U A R Y	1	Beauty and the Beast (re-release) (IMAX version)	Walt Disney Pictures	Gary Trousdale, Kirk Wise (directors); Linda Woolverton (screenplay); Paige O'Hara, Robby Benson, Richard White, Jerry Orbach, David Ogden Stiers, Angela Lansbury, Bradley Pierce, Rex Everhart, Jesse Corti, Jo Anne Worley, Hal Smith, Mary Kay Bergman, Brian Cummings, Alvin Epstein, Tony Jay, Kimmy Robertson, Kath Soucie, Frank Welker, Jack Angel, Bruce Adler, Vanna Bonta, Liz Callaway, Philip L. Clarke, Jennifer Darling, George Dvorsky, Bill Farmer, Sherry Lynn, Larry Moss, Caroline Peyton, Patrick Pinney, Phil Proctor, Gordon Stanley, Cynthia Richards, Linda Gary, Joe Ranft, Sheb Wooley, Alec Murphy, Mickie McGowan, Scott Barnes, Maureen Brennan, Margery Daley	
J A N U A R Y	4	Impostor	Miramax Films	Gary Fleder (director); Caroline Case, Ehren Kruger, David Twohy (screenplay); Gary Sinise, Madeleine Stowe, Vincent D'Onofrio, Mekhi Phifer, Tony Shalhoub, Tim Guinee, Gary Dourdan, Lindsay Crouse, Clarence Williams III, Elizabeth Pena, Shane Brolly, Golden Brooks, Ted King, Rachel Luttrell	
J A N U A R Y	11	Orange County	Paramount Pictures / MTV Films	Jake Kasdan (director); Mike White (screenplay); Colin Hanks, Jack Black, Catherine O'Hara, Schuyler Fisk, John Lithgow, Lily Tomlin, Jane Adams, Garry Marshall, Dana Ivey, Carly Pope, Chevy Chase, Leslie Mann, Bret Harrison, Kyle Howard, RJ Knoll, George Murdock, Monica Keena, Fran Kranz, Mike White, Sarah Hagan, Lizzy Caplan, Nat Faxon, Alexandra Breckenridge, Kevin Kline, Ben Stiller	
J A N U A R Y	18	Snow Dogs	Walt Disney Pictures / The Kerner Entertainment Company	Brian Levant (director); Jim Kouf, Tommy Swerdlow, Michael Goldberg, Mark Gibson, Philip Halprin (screenplay); Cuba Gooding Jr., James Coburn, Sisqó, Nichelle Nichols, Graham Greene, Joanna Bacalso, Christopher Judge, Michael Bolton, M. Emmet Walsh, Brian Doyle-Murray, Frank C. Turner, Jascha Washington, Alison Matthews, Danelle Folta, Jim Belushi, Jane Sibbett, Frank Welker, Richard Horvitz, David Barclay, Angela Moore	
J A N U A R Y	18	State Property	Lions Gate Films	Abdul Malik Abbott (director/screenplay); Ernest "Tron" Anderson (screenplay); Beanie Sigel, Jay-Z, Damon Dash, Memphis Bleek, Omillio Sparks, Rell, Young Chris, Young Neef, Amil, DJ Clue, Jacob the Jeweler	
J A N U A R Y	25	The Count of Monte Cristo	Touchstone Pictures / Spyglass Entertainment	Kevin Reynolds (director); Jay Wolpert (screenplay); James Caviezel, Guy Pearce, Dagmara Dominczyk, Richard Harris, Luis Guzmán, James Frain, Michael Wincott, Henry Cavill, JB Blanc, Alex Norton, Patrick Godfrey, Freddie Jones, Helen McCrory, Christopher Adamson, Albie Woodington	
J A N U A R Y	25	Kung Pow! Enter the Fist	20th Century Fox	Steve Oedekerk (director/screenplay); Steve Oedekerk, Jimmy Wang Yu, Hui Lou Chen, Fei Lung, Ling Ling Tse, Lin Yan, Lau Kar-wing, Jennifer Tung, Chi Ma, Tad Horino	
J A N U A R Y	25	The Mothman Prophecies	Screen Gems / Lakeshore Entertainment	Mark Pellington (director); Richard Hatem (screenplay); Richard Gere, Laura Linney, Will Patton, Debra Messing, Lucinda Jenney, Alan Bates, David Eigenberg, Bob Tracey, Mark Pellington	
J A N U A R Y	25	Storytelling	Fine Line Features	Todd Solondz (director/screenplay); Selma Blair, Leo Fitzpatrick, Paul Giamatti, John Goodman, James Van Der Beek, Mark Webber, Steven Rosen, Franka Potente, Robert Ray Wisdom, Maria Thayer, Angela Goethals, Devorah Rose, Nancy Anne Ridder, Aleksa Palladino, Mary Lynn Rajskub, Tina Holmes, Mike Schank, Xander Berkeley, Julie Hagerty, Noah Fleiss, Jonathan Osser, Lupe Ontiveros, Steve Railsback, Conan O'Brien	
J A N U A R Y	25	A Walk to Remember	Warner Bros. Pictures / Pandora Cinema	Adam Shankman (director); Karen Janszen (screenplay); Shane West, Mandy Moore, Peter Coyote, Daryl Hannah, Lauren German, Clayne Crawford, Paz de la Huerta, Al Thompson, Jonathan Parks Jordan, David Lee Smith	
J A N U A R Y	27	Stephen King's Rose Red	ABC / Mark Carliner Productions / Victor Television Productions	Craig R. Baxley (director); Stephen King (screenplay); Nancy Travis, Matt Keeslar, Julian Sands, Kimberly J. Brown, David Dukes, Judith Ivey, Melanie Lynskey, Matt Ross, Kevin Tighe, Julia Campbell, Emily Deschanel, Tsidii Le Loka, Yvonne Sciò, Jimmi Simpson, Richard Sanders, Stephen King, Laura Kenny, John Procaccino, Justin T. Milner, Paige Gordon, Don Alder	
F E B R U A R Y	1	Birthday Girl	Miramax Films	Jez Butterworth (director/screenplay); Tom Butterworth (screenplay); Nicole Kidman, Ben Chaplin, Vincent Cassel, Mathieu Kassovitz, Kate Evans, Stephen Mangan, Xander Armstrong, Sally Phillips, Ben Miller, Jonathan Aris, Steve Pemberton, Reece Shearsmith, Mark Gatiss	
F E B R U A R Y	1	Slackers	Screen Gems / Alliance Atlantis / Original Film	Dewey Nicks (director); David H. Steinberg (screenplay); Jason Schwartzman, Devon Sawa, Jason Segel, Mike Maronna, Jaime King, Laura Prepon, Matty Chong, Jim Rash, Retta, Leigh Taylor-Young, Joe Flaherty, Mamie Van Doren	
F E B R U A R Y	8	Big Fat Liar	Universal Pictures	Shawn Levy (director); Dan Schneider (screenplay); Frankie Muniz, Paul Giamatti, Amanda Bynes, Amanda Detmer, Donald Faison, Russell Hornsby, Michael Bryan French, Christine Tucci, Alexandra Breckenridge, Sandra Oh, Rebecca Corry, Jaleel White, Lee Majors, Sean O'Bryan, Amy Hill, John Cho, Taran Killam, Ted Rooney, John Gatins, Pat O'Brien, Kenan Thompson, Dustin Diamond, Shawn Levy, Matthew Frauman, Jake Minor, Kyle Swann, Sparkle, Chris Ott, Brian Turk, Don Yesso, Corinne Reilly, Bart Myer	
F E B R U A R Y	8	Collateral Damage	Warner Bros. Pictures / Bel-Air Entertainment	Andrew Davis (director); David Griffiths, Ronald Roose (screenplay); Arnold Schwarzenegger, Elias Koteas, Francesca Neri, Cliff Curtis, John Leguizamo, John Turturro, Lindsay Frost, Miguel Sandoval, Harry Lennix, Jane Lynch, Tyler Posey, Fernando Sarfati, Jsu Garcia, Michael Milhoan, Rick Worthy, Raymond Cruz, J. Kenneth Campbell, Rodrigo Obregon, Michael Cavanaugh, Nicholas Pryor	
F E B R U A R Y	8	Monster's Ball	Lions Gate Films	Marc Forster (director), Milo Addica (screenplay), Will Rooks (screenplay), Halle Berry, Billy Bob Thornton, Peter Boyle, Mos Def, Heath Ledger, Sean Combs	
F E B R U A R Y	8	Rollerball	Metro-Goldwyn-Mayer / Mosaic Media Group	John McTiernan (director); Larry Ferguson, John Pogue (screenplay); Chris Klein, Jean Reno, LL Cool J, Rebecca Romijn-Stamos, Naveen Andrews, Mike Dopud, Kata Dobo, Lucia Rijker, Oleg Taktarov, Paul Heyman, Janet Wright, Pink, Slipknot, Carroll Shelby, Shane McMahon	
F E B R U A R Y	15	Crossroads	Paramount Pictures / Zomba Films / MTV Films	Tamra Davis (director); Shonda Rhimes (screenplay); Britney Spears, Anson Mount, Zoe Saldaña, Taryn Manning, Kim Cattrall, Dan Aykroyd, Justin Long, Beverly Johnson, Kool Moe Dee, David 'Gruber' Allen, Jesse Camp, Jamie Lynn Spears	
F E B R U A R Y	15	Hart's War	Metro-Goldwyn-Mayer	Gregory Hoblit (director); Billy Ray, Terry George (screenplay); Bruce Willis, Colin Farrell, Terrence Howard, Cole Hauser, Marcel Iureş, Linus Roache, Vicellous Reon Shannon, Jonathan Brandis, Maury Sterling, Sam Jaeger, Scott Michael Campbell, Rory Cochrane, Sebastian Tillinger, Rick Ravanello, Adrian Grenier, Sam Worthington, Holger Handtke	
F E B R U A R Y	15	John Q.	New Line Cinema	Nick Cassavetes (director); James Kearns (screenplay); Denzel Washington, Robert Duvall, James Woods, Anne Heche, Kimberly Elise, Ray Liotta, Eddie Griffin, Shawn Hatosy, David Thornton, Laura Harring, Ethan Suplee, Kevin Connolly, Paul Johansson, Heather Wahlquist, Troy Beyer, Troy Winbush, Obba Babatunde, Larissa Laskin, Dina Waters, Martha Chaves, Keram Malicki-Sanchez, Vanessa Branch, Stephanie Moore, Gabriela Oltean	
F E B R U A R Y	15	Return to Never Land	Walt Disney Pictures / DisneyToon Studios	Robin Budd, Donovan Cook (director); Temple Mathews (screenplay); Blayne Weaver, Harriet Owen, Corey Burton, Jeff Bennett, Kath Soucie, Andrew McDonough, Roger Rees, Spencer Breslin, Bradley Pierce, Aaron Spann, Dan Castellaneta, Jim Cummings, Rob Paulsen, Clive Revill, Frank Welker, Wally Wingert, Robert Clotworthy, Edie Mirman, Quinn Beswick, L.A. Mad Dogs, Tom Amundsen, Mitch Carter, David Cowgill, Lake Eissinmann, Jack Gonneau	
F E B R U A R Y	15	Super Troopers	Fox Searchlight Pictures	Jay Chandrasekhar (director); Broken Lizard (screenplay); Jay Chandrasekhar, Kevin Heffernan, Steve Lemme, Paul Soter, Erik Stolhanske, Brian Cox, Marisa Coughlan, Daniel von Bargen, Jim Gaffigan, Blanchard Ryan, Lynda Carter, John Bedford Lloyd, Charlie Finn, James Grace, Michael Weaver, Dan Fey, Amy de Lucia, Jimmy Noonan	
F E B R U A R Y	22	Big Bad Love	IFC Films	Arliss Howard (director/screenplay); Jim Howard, Larry Brown (screenplay); Arliss Howard, Debra Winger, Paul Le Mat, Rosanna Arquette, Angie Dickinson, Michael Parks	
F E B R U A R Y	22	Dragonfly	Universal Pictures / Spyglass Entertainment	Tom Shadyac (director); Brandon Camp, Mike Thompson, David Seltzer (screenplay); Kevin Costner, Joe Morton, Ron Rifkin, Linda Hunt, Kathy Bates, Susanna Thompson, Jacob Vargas, Robert Bailey Jr.	
F E B R U A R Y	22	Mean Machine	Paramount Classics / SKA Films / Ruddy/Morgan Productions / Brad Grey Pictures	Barry Skolnick (director); Tracy Keenan Wynn, Charlie Fletcher, Chris Baker, Andrew Day (screenplay); Vinnie Jones, David Kelly, David Hemmings, Vas Blackwood, Jason Flemyng, Danny Dyer, Jason Statham, Jamie Sives, Stephen Walters, Rocky Marshall, Adam Fogerty, Ralph Brown, Robbie Gee, Geoff Bell, John Forgeham, Sally Phillips, Andrew Grainger, Martin Wimbush, Omid Djalili, J.J. Connolly, Jake Abraham, Charlie Hartfield, Paul Fishenden, Brian Gayle, Nevin Saroya, Perry Digweed, Ryan Giggs	
F E B R U A R Y	22	Monsoon Wedding	USA Films / IFC Productions / Mirabai Films / Delhi Dot Com	Mira Nair (director); Sabrina Dhawan (screenplay); Naseeruddin Shah, Lillete Dubey, Shefali Shah, Vasundhara Das, Vijay Raaz, Tillotama Shome, Randeep Hooda, Rajat Kapoor, Jas Arora, Parvin Dabas, Kulbhushan Kharbanda, Kamini Khanna, Neha Dubey, Ishaan Nair, Roshan Seth, Soni Razdan, Natasha Rastogi, Pankaj Jha, Ram Kapoor, Dibyendu Bhattacharya, Sabrina Dhawan, Mira Nair	
F E B R U A R Y	22	Queen of the Damned	Warner Bros. Pictures / Village Roadshow Pictures	Michael Rymer (director); Scott Abbott, Michael Petroni (screenplay); Aaliyah, Stuart Townsend, Marguerite Moreau, Paul McGann, Vincent Pérez, Lena Olin, Christian Manon, Claudia Black, Bruce Spence, Matthew Newton, Tiriel Mora, Megan Dorman, Johnathon Devoy, Pia Miranda	
F E B R U A R Y	26	Cinderella II: Dreams Come True	Walt Disney Home Entertainment	John Kafka, Darrell Rooney (directors); Jill E. Blotevogel, Tom Rogers, Jule Selbo (screenplay); Jennifer Hale, Christopher Daniel Barnes, Rob Paulsen, Corey Burton, Holland Taylor, Frank Welker, Tress MacNeille, Russi Taylor, Susanne Blakeslee, Andre Stojka, Jeff Bennett, Bob Bergen, Susan Blu, Rodger Bumpass, Jennifer Darling, Paul Eiding, Sherry Lynn, Mickie McGowan, Phil Proctor, Gina La Piana, Susan Yezzi	
M A R C H	1	40 Days and 40 Nights	Miramax Films / StudioCanal / Working Title Films	Michael Lehmann (director); Robert Perez (screenplay); Josh Hartnett, Shannyn Sossamon, Paulo Costanzo, Maggie Gyllenhaal, Vinessa Shaw, Adam Trese, Griffin Dunne, Keegan Connor Tracy, Emmanuelle Vaugier, Monet Mazur, Christine Chatelain, Mike Maronna, Stanley Anderson, Lorin Heath, Glenn Fitzgerald, Jarrad Paul, Terry Chen, Kai Lennox, Chris Gauthier, Barry Newman, Mary Gross, Dylan Neal	
M A R C H	1	We Were Soldiers	Paramount Pictures / Icon Productions	Randall Wallace (director/screenplay); Mel Gibson, Madeleine Stowe, Sam Elliott, Greg Kinnear, Chris Klein, Keri Russell, Barry Pepper, Luke Benward, Taylor Momsen, Devon Werkheiser, Mark McCracken, Don Duong, Ryan Hurst, Marc Blucas, Jsu Garcia, Jon Hamm, Clark Gregg, Blake Heron, Desmond Harrington, Dylan Walsh, Brian Tee, Robert Bagnell, Bellamy Young, Patrick St. Esprit, Jim Grimshaw	
M A R C H	8	All About the Benjamins	New Line Cinema / Cube Vision	Kevin Bray (director); Ice Cube, Ronald Lang (screenplay); Ice Cube, Mike Epps, Eva Mendes, Tommy Flanagan, Carmen Chaplin, Valarie Rae Miller, Roger Guenveur Smith, Anthony Michael Hall, Lil' Bow Wow, Anthony Giaimo, Robert MacBeth, Bob Carter, Barbara Barron	
M A R C H	8	The Time Machine	DreamWorks / Warner Bros. Pictures / Parkes/MacDonald Productions	Simon Wells (director); John Logan (screenplay); Guy Pearce, Samantha Mumba, Mark Addy, Sienna Guillory, Phyllida Law, Alan Young, Orlando Jones, Jeremy Irons, Omero Mumba, Yancey Arias, Laura Kirk, Josh Stamberg, Myndy Crist, Connie Ray, Doug Jones, Richard Cetrone	
M A R C H	9	The Laramie Project	HBO Films	Moisés Kaufman (director/screenplay); Dylan Baker, Tom Bower, Clancy Brown, Steve Buscemi, Nestor Carbonell, Kathleen Chalfant, Jeremy Davies, Clea DuVall, Peter Fonda, Ben Foster, Janeane Garofalo, Bill Irwin, Joshua Jackson, Terry Kinney, Laura Linney, Amy Madigan, Margo Martindale, Camryn Manheim, Christina Ricci, Lois Smith, Frances Sternhagen, Mark Webber, Andy Paris, Michael Emerson, Stephen Belber, Noah Fleiss, Summer Phoenix, Richard Riehle, Kevin Aviance, Bill Clinton, Ellen DeGeneres	
M A R C H	13	Kissing Jessica Stein	Fox Searchlight Pictures	Charles Herman-Wurmfeld (director); Heather Juergensen, Jennifer Westfeldt (screenplay); Jennifer Westfeldt, Heather Juergensen, Scott Cohen, Jackie Hoffman, Tovah Feldshuh, Brian Stepanek, John Cariani, Michael Mastro, Carson Elrod, David Aaron Baker, Jon Hamm, Michael Ealy, Michael Showalter, Idina Menzel, Esther Wurmfeld	
M A R C H	15	Harrison's Flowers	Universal Pictures / Lions Gate Films / StudioCanal	Elie Chouraqui (director/screenplay); Didier Le Pecheur, Isabel Ellsen (screenplay); Andie MacDowell, Elias Koteas, Brendan Gleeson, Adrien Brody, David Strathairn, Alun Armstrong, Caroline Goodall, Diane Baker, Quinn Shephard, Marie Trintignant, Gerard Butler	
M A R C H	15	Ice Age	20th Century Fox / Blue Sky Studios	Chris Wedge, Carlos Saldanha (directors); Michael J. Wilson, Michael Berg, Peter Ackerman (screenplay); Ray Romano, John Leguizamo, Denis Leary, Chris Wedge, Goran Višnjić, Jack Black, Cedric the Entertainer, Stephen Root, Diedrich Bader, Alan Tudyk, Lorri Bagley, Jane Krakowski, Josh Hamilton, Denny Dillon, Mitzi McCall, Tara Strong, Peter Ackerman, P.J. Benjamin	
M A R C H	15	Resident Evil	Screen Gems	Paul W. S. Anderson (director/screenplay); Milla Jovovich, Michelle Rodriguez, Eric Mabius, James Purefoy, Martin Crewes, Colin Salmon, Indra Ové, Joseph May, Heike Makatsch, Stephen Billington, Fiona Glascott, Pasquale Aleardi, Liz May Brice, Jason Isaacs, Ryan McCluskey, Oscar Pearce, Anna Bolt, Robert Tannion, Michaela Dicker	
M A R C H	15	Showtime	Warner Bros. Pictures / Village Roadshow Pictures	Tom Dey (director); Jorge Saralegui, Keith Sharon (screenplay); Robert De Niro, Eddie Murphy, Rene Russo, Frankie Faison, Pedro Damián, Drena De Niro, William Shatner, Mos Def, Peter Jacobson, Kadeem Hardison, Nestor Serrano, Rachael Harris, Alex Borstein, Marshall Manesh, James Roday, Larry Joe Campbell, Ken Hudson Campbell, Johnnie L. Cochran Jr., Joy Bryant, Maurice Compte, Merlin Santana, Judah Friedlander, Angela Alvarado, Henry Kingi	
M A R C H	19	The Hunchback of Notre Dame II	Walt Disney Home Entertainment	Bradley Raymond (director); Jule Selbo, Flip Kobler, Cindy Marcus (screenplay); Tom Hulce, Demi Moore, Kevin Kline, Jennifer Love Hewitt, Haley Joel Osment, Michael McKean, Jason Alexander, Paul Kandel, Charles Kimbrough, Jane Withers, Jim Cummings, Joe Lala, Frank Welker, April Winchell, Nicholas Guest, Bridget Hoffman, Luisa Leschin, Edie Mirman, Philece Sampler, Tara Strong, Newell Alexander, Philippe Benichou, Mitch Carter, Fredrika Kasten, David Cowgill, Wendy Cutler, Lake Eissinman	
M A R C H	22	Blade II	New Line Cinema / Marvel Entertainment	Guillermo del Toro (director); David S. Goyer (screenplay); Wesley Snipes, Kris Kristofferson, Ron Perlman, Leonor Varela, Norman Reedus, Thomas Kretschmann, Luke Goss, Matt Schulze, Danny John-Jules, Donnie Yen, Karel Roden, Marit Velle Kile, Tony Curran, Santiago Segura, Daz Crawford	
M A R C H	22	E.T. the Extra-Terrestrial (re-release)	Universal Pictures / Amblin Entertainment	Steven Spielberg (director); Melissa Mathison (screenplay); Henry Thomas, Dee Wallace Stone, Peter Coyote, Robert MacNaughton, Drew Barrymore, K.C. Martel, C. Thomas Howell, Sean Frye, Erika Eleniak, Pat Welsh, Anne Lockhart	
M A R C H	22	Sorority Boys	Touchstone Pictures	Wallace Wolodarsky (director); Joe Jarvis, Greg Coolidge (screenplay); Barry Watson, Michael Rosenbaum, Harland Williams, Melissa Sagemiller, Tony Denman, Brad Beyer, Heather Matarazzo, Yvonne Sciò, Omar Benson Miller, Peter Scolari, Bree Turner, James Naughton, Mark Metcalf, Stephen Furst, John Vernon, Brian Posehn, Kathryn Stockwood, Mike Beaver	
M A R C H	22	Stolen Summer	Miramax Films	Pete Jones (director/screenplay); Aidan Quinn, Bonnie Hunt, Kevin Pollak, Brian Dennehy, Adi Stein, Mike Weinberg, Ryan Jonathan Kelley, Eddie Kaye Thomas, Will Malnati	
M A R C H	29	Clockstoppers	Paramount Pictures / Nickelodeon Movies	Jonathan Frakes (director); Rob Hedden, J. David Stem, David N. Weiss (screenplay); Jesse Bradford, Paula Garcés, French Stewart, Michael Biehn, Robin Thomas, Julia Sweeney, Lindze Letherman, Jason George, Ken Jenkins, Jonathan Frakes, Miko Hughes, Scott Thomson, Gina Hecht, Funkmaster Flex, Jenette Goldstein, Melanie Mayron, Garikayi Mutambirwa, Grant Marvin, Linda Kim, Pamela Dunlap, Tony Abatemarco, Judi M. Durand	
M A R C H	29	Death to Smoochy	Warner Bros. Pictures	Danny DeVito (director); Adam Resnick (screenplay); Robin Williams, Edward Norton, Danny DeVito, Catherine Keener, Jon Stewart, Pam Ferris, Michael Rispoli, Harvey Fierstein, Vincent Schiavelli, Danny Woodburn, Robert Prosky, Jeff Skinner, Bill Lake, Tracey Walter, Louis Giambalvo, Martin Klebba, Christy McGinity Gibel, Philip Craig, Richard Hamilton, Todd Graff, Matthew Arkin, Fred Scialla, Peter Keleghan, Katie Finneran	
M A R C H	29	No Such Thing	United Artists	Hal Hartley (director/screenplay); Sarah Polley, Helen Mirren, Julie Christie, Robert John Burke, Baltasar Kormakur, Erica Gimpel, Annika Peterson	
M A R C H	29	Panic Room	Columbia Pictures	David Fincher (director); David Koepp (screenplay); Jodie Foster, Kristen Stewart, Forest Whitaker, Jared Leto, Dwight Yoakam, Patrick Bauchau, Andrew Kevin Walker, Ann Magnuson	
M A R C H	29	The Rookie	Walt Disney Pictures	John Lee Hancock (director); Mike Rich (screenplay); Dennis Quaid, Rachel Griffiths, Jay Hernandez, Brian Cox, Beth Grant, Angus T. Jones, Rick Gonzalez, Chad Lindberg, Royce D. Applegate, Raynor Scheine, Chris Sheffield, Angelo Spizzirri, Russell Richardson, David Blackwell, Blue Deckert, Danny Kamin, Robbie Bigelow	

== April–June ==
Opening		Title	Production company	Cast and crew	Ref.
A P R I L	5	Big Trouble	Touchstone Pictures / Sonnenfeld Josephson Entertainment	Barry Sonnenfeld (director); Robert Ramsey, Matthew Stone (screenplay); Tim Allen, Rene Russo, Stanley Tucci, Ben Foster, Zooey Deschanel, Tom Sizemore, Johnny Knoxville, Dennis Farina, Janeane Garofalo, Patrick Warburton, Dwight "Heavy D" Myers, Omar Epps, Jason Lee, Sofia Vergara, Michael McShane, DJ Qualls, Andy Richter, Jack Kehler, Daniel London, Lars Arentz-Hansen, Cullen Douglas, David Koepp, Barry Sonnenfeld, Antoni Corone, Siobhan Fallon Hogan, Marc Macaulay, Martha Stewart	
A P R I L	5	High Crimes	20th Century Fox / Regency Enterprises	Carl Franklin (director); Yuri Zeltser, Grace Cary Bickley (screenplay); Ashley Judd, Morgan Freeman, Jim Caviezel, Adam Scott, Amanda Peet, Bruce Davison, Juan Carlos Hernández, Michael Gaston, Tom Bower, Jude Ciccolella, Emilio Rivera, Michael Shannon, Dendrie Taylor, Paula Jai Parker, Dawn Hudson, Julie Remala	
A P R I L	5	National Lampoon's Van Wilder	Artisan Entertainment	Walt Becker (director); Brent Goldberg, David T. Wagner (screenplay); Ryan Reynolds, Tara Reid, Kal Penn, Tim Matheson, Paul Gleason, Daniel Cosgrove, Teck Holmes, Emily Rutherfurd, Curtis Armstrong, Deon Richmond, Alex Burns, Chris Owen, Ivana Bozilovic, Sophia Bush, Simon Helberg, Quentin Richardson, Michael Olowokandi, Darius Miles, Erik Estrada, Edie McClurg, Michael Waltman, Aaron Paul, Teresa Hill, Dr. Joyce Brothers, Tom Everett Scott, Walt Becker, Lamar Odom	
A P R I L	5	Swimming	Oceanside Pictures	Robert J. Siegel (director/screenplay); Lisa Bazadona, Grace Woodard (screenplay); Lauren Ambrose, Jennifer Dundas Lowe, Joelle Carter, Josh Pais, Joshua Harto, Anthony Ruivivar, Sharon Scruggs, Jamie Harrold, James Villemaire	
A P R I L	12	The Cat's Meow	Lions Gate Films	Peter Bogdanovich (director); Steven Peros (screenplay); Kirsten Dunst, Eddie Izzard, Edward Herrmann, Cary Elwes, Joanna Lumley, Jennifer Tilly, Claudia Harrison, James Laurenson, Ronan Vibert, John C. Vennema, Ingrid Lacey, Victor Slezak, Chiara Schoras, Claudie Blakley, Steven Peros	
A P R I L	12	Changing Lanes	Paramount Pictures	Roger Michell (director); Chap Taylor, Michael Tolkin (screenplay); Ben Affleck, Samuel L. Jackson, Toni Collette, Sydney Pollack, William Hurt, Amanda Peet, Tina Sloan, Richard Jenkins, Cole Hawkins, Ileen Getz, Jennifer Dundas Lowe, Matt Malloy, Bruce Altman, Joe Grifasi, Angela Goethals, Kevin Sussman, John Benjamin Hickey, Dylan Baker, Jordan Gelber, Olga Merediz, Jayne Houdyshell	
A P R I L	12	Frailty	Lions Gate Films	Bill Paxton (director); Brent Hanley (screenplay); Bill Paxton, Matthew McConaughey, Powers Boothe, Matt O'Leary, Jeremy Sumpter, Luke Askew, Levi Kreis, Derk Cheetwood, Missy Crider, Alan Davidson, Cynthia Ettinger, Vincent Chase, Gwen McGee, Edmond Scott Ratliff, Rebecca Tilney	
A P R I L	12	Harvard Man	Lions Gate Films / Multicom Entertainment Group / The Kushner-Locke Company / Bigel/Mailer Films	James Toback (director/screenplay); Adrian Grenier, Sarah Michelle Gellar, Joey Lauren Adams, Rebecca Gayheart, Gianni Russo, Ray Allen, Eric Stoltz, John Neville, Polly Shannon, Clé Bennett, Booth Savage, Kristi Angus, Al Franken, Peter Mensah, Joe Pingue, J. Miles Dale, Rick Ducommun, Michael Aparo, Scottie Epstein, Phillip Jarrett, Chantal Cousineau, Ivan Kajfes	
A P R I L	12	The Sweetest Thing	Columbia Pictures	Roger Kumble (director); Nancy Pimental (screenplay); Cameron Diaz, Christina Applegate, Selma Blair, Thomas Jane, Jason Bateman, Parker Posey, Frank Grillo, Eddie McClintock, Lillian Adams, James Mangold, Johnny Messner, Georgia Engel, Johnathon Schaech, Love Jones, Mitch Mullany, Jennifer Gimenez, Siena Goines, John Lehr, Loren Lester, John Bennett Perry, Nancy Priddy, Jeanne Sakata, Erik Stolhanske, Stryker, Cyia Batten, Nancy M. Pimental, Beverly Polcyn, Kevin Alexander Stea, Zach Woodlee	
A P R I L	17	Triumph of Love	Paramount Classics	Clare Peploe (director/screenplay); Marilyn Goldin, Bernando Bertolucci (screenplay); Mira Sorvino, Ben Kingsley, Fiona Shaw, Rachael Stirling, Luis Molteni, Jay Rodan, Ignazio Oliva	
A P R I L	19	Enigma	Manhattan Pictures International / Miramax Films / Jagged Films / Broadway Video	Michael Apted (director); Tom Stoppard (screenplay); Dougray Scott, Kate Winslet, Saffron Burrows, Jeremy Northam, Nikolaj Coster-Waldau, Tom Hollander, Donald Sumpter, Matthew Macfadyen, Richard Leaf, Bo Poraj, Tom Fisher, Robert Pugh, Corin Redgrave, Nicholas Rowe, Angus MacInnes, Mary MacLeod, Michael Troughton, Edward Hardwicke, Anne-Marie Duff, Tim Bentinck, Emma Davies, Wilhelm Brückner, Joseph Goebbels, Adolf Hitler, Mick Jagger, Viktor Lutze, Lee Montague, Julius Schaub, Werner von Blomberg, Werner von Fritsch, Ian Felce, Paul Rattray, Richard Katz	
A P R I L	19	Murder by Numbers	Warner Bros. Pictures / Castle Rock Entertainment	Barbet Schroeder (director); Tony Gayton (screenplay); Sandra Bullock, Ben Chaplin, Ryan Gosling, Michael Pitt, Agnes Bruckner, Chris Penn, R.D. Call, Tom Verica, John Vickery, Brian Stepanek, Ralph Seymour, Christine Healy, Nick Offerman, Janni Brenn, Michael Canavan, Krista Carpenter	
A P R I L	19	My Big Fat Greek Wedding	IFC Films / Gold Circle Films / Playtone	Joel Zwick (director); Nia Vardalos (screenplay); Nia Vardalos, John Corbett, Lainie Kazan, Michael Constantine, Andrea Martin, Louis Mandylor, Gia Carides, Gerry Mendicino, Joey Fatone, Ian Gomez, Bruce Gray, Fiona Reid, Jayne Eastwood, Arielle Sugarman, Bess Meisler, Stavroula Logothettis	
A P R I L	19	The Scorpion King	Universal Pictures / Alphaville Films	Chuck Russell (director); Stephen Sommers, William Osborne, David Hayter (screenplay); Dwayne "The Rock" Johnson, Steven Brand, Kelly Hu, Bernard Hill, Grant Heslov, Peter Facinelli, Michael Clarke Duncan, Ralf Moeller, Branscombe Richmond, Roger Rees, Sherri Howard, Joseph Ruskin, Conrad Roberts, Marissa McMahon, K.D. Aubert, Al Leong, Paul Sloan, Adoni Maropis, Bernard White, Amy Hunter, Summer Altice, Peter "Navy" Tuiasosopo, Tyler Mane, Julie Michaels	
A P R I L	26	Jason X	New Line Cinema	Jim Isaac (director); Todd Farmer (screenplay); Kane Hodder, Lexa Doig, Lisa Ryder, Chuck Campbell, Melyssa Ade, Peter Mensah, Melody Johnson, Derwin Jordan, Jonathan Potts, Philip Williams, Dov Tiefenbach, Kristi Angus, Dylan Bierk, Amanda Brugel, Yani Gellman, Todd Farmer, David Cronenberg, Robert A. Silverman, Marcus Parilo, Boyd Banks	
A P R I L	26	Life or Something Like It	20th Century Fox / Regency Enterprises	Stephen Herek (director); John Scott Shepherd, Dana Stevens (screenplay); Angelina Jolie, Edward Burns, Stockard Channing, Christian Kane, Tony Shalhoub, James Gammon, Melissa Errico, Lisa Thornhill, Gregory Itzin, Jesse James Rutherford	
A P R I L	26	The Salton Sea	Warner Bros. Pictures / Castle Rock Entertainment	D.J. Caruso (director); Tony Gayton (screenplay); Val Kilmer, Vincent D'Onofrio, Doug Hutchison, Peter Sarsgaard, Adam Goldberg, Luis Guzmán, Anthony LaPaglia, Glenn Plummer, Deborah Kara Unger, Chandra West, B.D. Wong, R. Lee Ermey, Shalom Harlow, Shirley Knight, Meat Loaf Aday, Danny Trejo	
A P R I L	27	The Gathering Storm	HBO Films	Richard Loncraine (director); Hugh Whitemore (screenplay); Albert Finney, Vanessa Redgrave, Jim Broadbent, Linus Roache, Lena Headey, Derek Jacobi, Ronnie Barker, Tom Wilkinson, Celia Imrie, Hugh Bonneville, Gottfried John, Edward Hardwicke, Tom Hiddleston, Tim Bentinck, Diana Hoddinott, Dolly Wells, Lyndsey Marshal, Nancy Carroll, John Standing, Simon Williams, Joanna McCallum, Anthony Brophy, Emma Seigel, Gerrard McArthur	
M A Y	3	Deuces Wild	Metro-Goldwyn-Mayer	Scott Kalvert (director); Paul Kimatian, Christopher Gambale (screenplay); Stephen Dorff, Brad Renfro, Fairuza Balk, Vincent Pastore, Frankie Muniz, Balthazar Getty, Matt Dillon, Norman Reedus, Max Perlich, Drea de Matteo, Louis Lombardi, Deborah Harry, James Franco, Joshua Leonard, Johnny Knoxville, George Georgiadis, Jackie Tohn	
M A Y	3	Hollywood Ending	DreamWorks	Woody Allen (director/screenplay); Woody Allen, George Hamilton, Téa Leoni, Debra Messing, Mark Rydell, Treat Williams, Tiffani Thiessen, Peter Gerety, Neal Huff, Lu Yu, Barney Cheng, Jodie Markell, Isaac Mizrahi, Marian Seldes, Greg Mottola, Fred Melamed, Jeff Mazzola, Aaron Stanford, Erica Leerhsen, Joe Rigano, Mark Webber, Rochelle Oliver	
M A Y	3	Spider-Man	Columbia Pictures / Marvel Enterprises	Sam Raimi (director); David Koepp (screenplay); Tobey Maguire, Willem Dafoe, Kirsten Dunst, James Franco, Cliff Robertson, Rosemary Harris, J.K. Simmons, Joe Manganiello, Gerry Becker, Bill Nunn, Jack Betts, Stanley Anderson, Ron Perkins, Michael Papajohn, Ted Raimi, Bruce Campbell, Elizabeth Banks, Octavia Spencer, Macy Gray, Lucy Lawless, Chris Coppola, Scott Spiegel, Stan Lee, K.K. Dodds, John Paxton, Tim DeZarn	
M A Y	10	The New Guy	Columbia Pictures / Revolution Studios	Ed Decter (director); David Kendall (screenplay); DJ Qualls, Eliza Dushku, Eddie Griffin, Zooey Deschanel, Lyle Lovett, Jerod Mixon, Parry Shen, Rachael E. Stevens, Ameer Baraka, Kina Cosper, Ross Patterson, Geoffrey Lewis, Kurt Fuller, Sunny Mabrey, Illeana Douglas, Justine Johnston, Matt Gogin, Jerry O'Connell, Charlie O'Connell, Vanilla Ice, Tony Hawk, David Hasselhoff, Tommy Lee, Kool Moe Dee, Horatio Sanz, Henry Rollins, Josh Todd, Jai Rodriguez, Jermaine Dupri, M. C. Gainey, Kyle Gass, Gene Simmons, James Brown, Valente Rodriguez	
M A Y	10	Ultimate X: The Movie	Touchstone Pictures	Bruce Hendricks (director/screenplay); Dave Mirra, Mike Metzger, Bucky Lasek, Brian Deegan, Mat Hoffman, Bob Burnquist, Carey Hart	
M A Y	10	Unfaithful	20th Century Fox / Fox 2000 Pictures / Regency Enterprises	Adrian Lyne (director); Alvin Sargent, William Broyles Jr. (screenplay); Richard Gere, Diane Lane, Olivier Martinez, Erik Per Sullivan, Michelle Monaghan, Chad Lowe, Erich Anderson, Damon Gupton, Kate Burton, Margaret Colin, Dominic Chianese, Željko Ivanek, Gary Basaraba, Anne Pitoniak, Lisa Emery, Michael Emerson, John Rothman, Myra Lucretia Taylor, Larry Gleason, Frederikke Borge, Russell Gibson, Maria Gelardi, Leslie Shenkel, Geoffrey Nauffts	
M A Y	16	Star Wars: Episode II – Attack of the Clones	20th Century Fox / Lucasfilm	George Lucas (director/screenplay); Jonathan Hales (screenplay); Ewan McGregor, Natalie Portman, Hayden Christensen, Christopher Lee, Samuel L. Jackson, Ian McDiarmid, Anthony Daniels, Kenny Baker, Frank Oz, Pernilla August, Temuera Morrison, Jimmy Smits, Jack Thompson, Leeanna Walsman, Ahmed Best, Rose Byrne, Oliver Ford Davies, Ronald Falk, Jay Laga'aia, Andy Secombe, Silas Carson, Ayesha Dharker, Joel Edgerton, Daniel Logan, Bonnie Piesse, Anthony Phelan, Rena Owen, Alethea McGrath, Susie Porter, Matt Doran, Alan Ruscoe, Matt Sloan, Veronica Segura, David Bowers, Steve John Shepherd, Marton Csokas, Liam Neeson, Leonard L. Thomas, Christopher Truswell, Matthew Wood	
M A Y	17	About a Boy	Universal Pictures / StudioCanal / Working Title Films	Chris Weitz, Paul Weitz (directors/screenplay); Peter Hedges (screenplay); Hugh Grant, Nicholas Hoult, Toni Collette, Rachel Weisz, Natalia Tena, Sharon Small, Nicholas Hutchinson, Victoria Smurfit, Isabel Brook, Ben Ridgeway, Jenny Galloway, Augustus Prew, Denise Stephenson, Rosalind Knight, Tim Rice	
M A Y	17	The Believer	Fireworks Pictures / IDP Distribution / Seven Arts Pictures	Henry Bean (director/screenplay); Ryan Gosling, Billy Zane, Theresa Russell, Summer Phoenix, Ronald Guttman, Glenn Fitzgerald, Garret Dillahunt, Heather Goldenhersh, A.D. Miles, Henry Bean, Joshua Harto, Elizabeth Reaser, Tovah Feldshuh, Roberto Gari, Tommy Nohilly, Chuck Ardezzone, Dean Strober, Judah Lazarus, Sascha Knopf, Jacob Green, Frank Winters, James G. McCaffrey	
M A Y	17	The Importance of Being Earnest	Miramax Films	Oliver Parker (director/screenplay); Rupert Everett, Colin Firth, Frances O'Connor, Reese Witherspoon, Judi Dench, Tom Wilkinson, Anna Massey, Edward Fox, Patrick Godfrey	
M A Y	18	Path to War	HBO Films	John Frankenheimer (director); Daniel Giat (screenplay); Michael Gambon, Donald Sutherland, Alec Baldwin, Bruce McGill, James Frain, Felicity Huffman, Frederic Forrest, John Aylward, Philip Baker Hall, Tom Skerritt, Diana Scarwid, Sarah Paulson, Gerry Becker, Peter Jacobson, Cliff DeYoung, John Valenti, Chris Eigeman, Francis Guinan, Robert Cicchini, Randy Oglesby, Victor Slezak, Curtis McClarin, J.K. Simmons, Reed Diamond, Albert Hall, Patricia Kalember, Ron Perkins, Gina-Raye Carter, Kirk Woller, Walter Cronkite, Robert F. Kennedy, Gary Sinise, Madison Mason	
M A Y	24	CQ	United Artists	Roman Coppola (director/screenplay); Jeremy Davis, Angela Lindvall, Élodie Bouchez, Gérard Depardieu, Billy Zane, Giancarlo Giannini, Massimo Ghini, Jason Schwartzman, John Phillip Law, Silvio Muccino, Dean Stockwell, Natalia Vodianova, Sofia Coppola, Bernard Verley, L.M. Kit Carson, Romain Duris	
M A Y	24	Enough	Columbia Pictures	Michael Apted (director); Nicholas Kazan (screenplay); Jennifer Lopez, Billy Campbell, Juliette Lewis, Dan Futterman, Fred Ward, Tessa Allen, Noah Wyle, Christopher Maher, Janet Carroll, Bill Cobbs, Bruce A. Young, Bruce French, Ruben Madera, Dan Martin, Jeff Kober, Brent Sexton, Michael Byrne	
M A Y	24	Insomnia	Warner Bros. Pictures / Alcon Entertainment	Christopher Nolan (director); Hillary Seitz (screenplay); Al Pacino, Robin Williams, Hilary Swank, Maura Tierney, Martin Donovan, Nicky Katt, Paul Dooley, Crystal Lowe, Jay Brazeau, Larry Holden, Kerry Sandomirsky, Lorne Cardinal, Katharine Isabelle, Jonathan Jackson, Paula Shaw	
M A Y	24	Spirit: Stallion of the Cimarron	DreamWorks	Kelly Asbury, Lorna Cook (directors); John Fusco (screenplay); Matt Damon, James Cromwell, Richard McGonagle, Matt Levin, Charles Napier, Zahn McClarnon, Michael Horse, Don Fullilove, Rodger Bumpass, Jack Angel, Patrick Pinney, Phil Proctor, Bob Bergen, Paul Eiding, Chris Sanders, Robert Clotworthy, Paul Pape, Brian Tochi, Jim Cummings, Corey Burton, Daniel Studi, Robert Cait, David Cowgill, Chopper Bernet, Jeff LeBeau, Danny Mann, Daamen J. Krall	
M A Y	24	Thirteen Conversations About One Thing	Sony Pictures Classics	Jill Sprecher (director/screenplay); Karen Sprecher (screenplay); Matthew McConaughey, John Turturro, Clea DuVall, Amy Irving, Alan Arkin, Frankie Faison, Barbara Sukowa, Tia Texada, Shawn Elliott, Richard E. Council, Walt MacPherson, Daryl Edwards, Joseph Siravo, A.D. Miles, Sig Libowitz, James Yaegashi, Dion Graham, Rob McElhenney, Elizabeth Reaser, Deirdre Lovejoy, Malcolm Gets	
M A Y	31	The Sum of All Fears	Paramount Pictures	Phil Alden Robinson (director); Paul Attanasio, Daniel Pyne (screenplay); Ben Affleck, Morgan Freeman, James Cromwell, Ciarán Hinds, Liev Schreiber, Bridget Moynahan, Michael Byrne, Colm Feore, Alan Bates, Ron Rifkin, Bruce McGill, Richard Marner, Philip Baker Hall, Josef Sommer, Ken Jenkins, Philip Akin, John Beasley, Lee Garlington, Joel Bissonnette, Sven-Ole Thorsen, Aleksandr Belyavsky, Lev Prygunov, Yevgeni Lazarev, Gregory Hlady	
M A Y	31	Undercover Brother	Universal Pictures / Imagine Entertainment	Malcolm D. Lee (director); John Ridley, Michael McCullers (screenplay); Eddie Griffin, Chris Kattan, Dave Chappelle, Denise Richards, Aunjanue Ellis, Neil Patrick Harris, Chi McBride, Gary Anthony Williams, Billy Dee Williams, Jack Noseworthy, James Brown, Robert Townsend, Pam Grier, Jesse Jackson, Jim Kelly, Martin Luther King, Mr. T, Dennis Rodman, Richard Roundtree, Jaleel White, J.D. Hall, Robert Trumbull	
J U N E	7	Bad Company	Touchstone Pictures / Jerry Bruckheimer Films	Joel Schumacher (director); Jason Richman, Michael Browning (screenplay); Anthony Hopkins, Chris Rock, Kerry Washington, Peter Stormare, Gabriel Macht, Adoni Maropis, Garcelle Beauvais, Matthew Marsh, Dragan Mićanović, John Slattery, Brooke Smith, Daniel Sunjata, DeVone Lawson Jr., Wills Robbins, Marek Vašut, Irma P. Hall, Dan Ziskie, John Aylward, John Fink, Michael Ealy, Shea Whigham, Charlie Day	
J U N E	7	Divine Secrets of the Ya-Ya Sisterhood	Warner Bros. Pictures / Gaylord Films	Callie Khouri (director/screenplay); Mark Andrus (screenplay); Sandra Bullock, Ellen Burstyn, Ashley Judd, James Garner, Maggie Smith, Fionnula Flanagan, Shirley Knight, Angus Macfadyen, Matthew Settle, Cherry Jones, David Rasche, Gina McKee, Mark Joy, Caitlin Wachs, David Lee Smith, Katy Selverstone, Jacqueline McKenzie, Kiersten Warren	
J U N E	7	Ivans Xtc	Artistic License Films / Metro-Tartan Distribution	Bernard Rose (director/screenplay); Lisa Enos (screenplay); Danny Huston, Peter Weller, Lisa Enos, James Merendino, Adam Krentzman, Sarah Danielle Madison, Tiffani Thiessen, Dan Ireland, Lisa Henson, Hal Lieberman, Valeria Golino, Angela Featherstone, Victoria Silvstedt, Ira Newborn	
J U N E	14	The Bourne Identity	Universal Pictures / The Kennedy/Marshall Company	Doug Liman (director); Tony Gilroy, William Blake Herron (screenplay); Matt Damon, Franka Potente, Chris Cooper, Brian Cox, Julia Stiles, Clive Owen, Adewale Akinnuoye-Agbaje, Gabriel Mann, Orso Maria Guerrini, Tim Dutton, Vincent Franklin, Walton Goggins, Josh Hamilton, Brian Huskey, David Bamber, David Gasman, Hubert Saint-Macary, Nicky Naude, Russell Levy	
J U N E	14	Cinema Paradiso (re-release) (Director's Cut)	Miramax Films	Giuseppe Tornatore (director/screenplay); Philippe Noiret, Jacques Perrin, Antonella Attili, Pupella Maggio, Salvatore Cascio, Agnese Nano, Brigitte Fossey, Enzo Cannavale, Isa Danieli, Leopoldo Trieste, Nino Terzo, Leo Gullotta, Tano Cimarosa, Nicola Di Pinto, Giuseppe Tornatore	
J U N E	14	The Dangerous Lives of Altar Boys	THINKFilm	Peter Care (director); Jeff Stockwell, Michael Petroni (screenplay); Emile Hirsch, Kieran Culkin, Jena Malone, Jodie Foster, Vincent D'Onofrio, Jake Richardson, Tyler Long, Arthur Bridges	
J U N E	14	Scooby-Doo	Warner Bros. Pictures / Mosaic Media Group	Raja Gosnell (director); James Gunn (screenplay); Freddie Prinze Jr., Sarah Michelle Gellar, Matthew Lillard, Linda Cardellini, Rowan Atkinson, Isla Fisher, Miguel A. Nunez Jr., Steven Grives, Sugar Ray, Sam Greco, Kristian Schmid, Nicholas Hope, Michala Banas, Holly Brisley, Andrew Bryniarski, Neil Fanning, Scott Innes, J.P. Manoux, Jess Harnell, Frank Welker, Pamela Anderson	
J U N E	14	Windtalkers	Metro-Goldwyn-Mayer	John Woo (director); John Rice, Joe Batteer (screenplay); Nicolas Cage, Christian Slater, Adam Beach, Peter Stormare, Noah Emmerich, Mark Ruffalo, Roger Willie, Brian Van Holt, Martin Henderson, Frances O'Connor, Jason Isaacs	
J U N E	18	Air Bud: Seventh Inning Fetch	Buena Vista Home Entertainment	Robert Vince (director); Sara Sutton, Stephanie Isherwood, Anne Vince, Anna McRoberts (screenplay); Kevin Zegers, Caitlin Wachs, Cynthia Stevenson, Richard Karn, Molly Hagan, Chantal Strand, Jay Brazeau, Frank C. Turner, Patrick Crenshaw, Jim Hughson, Shayn Solberg, Hannah Marof, Emma Marof, Doug Funk, Ellen Kennedy	
J U N E	18	American Psycho II: All American Girl	Lions Gate Home Entertainment	Morgan J. Freeman (director); Alex Sanger, Karen Craig (screenplay); Mila Kunis, William Shatner, Kim Schraner, Geraint Wyn Davies, Michael Kremko, Robin Dunne, Kim Poirier, Lindy Booth, Charles Officer, Kay Hawtrey, Shoshana Sperling, Lynne Deragon, Philip Williams, Susan Dalton, Jenna Perry	
J U N E	21	Juwanna Mann	Warner Bros. Pictures / Morgan Creek Productions	Jesse Vaughan (director); Bradley Allenstein (screenplay); Miguel A. Núñez Jr., Vivica A. Fox, Kevin Pollak, Tommy Davidson, Kim Wayans, Ginuwine, Jenifer Lewis, Lil' Kim, Annie Corley, Tammi Reiss, Heather Quella, Itoro Coleman, Rasheed Wallace, Vlade Divac, Dikembe Mutombo, Muggsy Bogues, Ric Reitz, Omar Dorsey, J. Don Ferguson, Cynthia Cooper, Teresa Weatherspoon, Katy Steding, Jeanne Zelasko, Chris Myers, Roy Firestone, Kevin Frazier, Kenny Albert, Jay Leno	
J U N E	21	Lilo & Stitch	Walt Disney Pictures	Chris Sanders, Dean DeBlois (directors/screenplay); Daveigh Chase, Chris Sanders, Tia Carrere, David Ogden Stiers, Kevin McDonald, Ving Rhames, Zoe Caldwell, Jason Scott Lee, Kevin Michael Richardson, Amy Hill, Jack Angel, Bob Bergen, Steve Blum, Rodger Bumpass, Cathy Cavadini, Jennifer Darling, John DeMita, Greg Finley, Jeff Fischer, Jess Harnell, Patrick Pinney, Susan Silo, Kath Soucie, Doug Stone, Susan Hegarty	
J U N E	21	Minority Report	20th Century Fox / DreamWorks / Amblin Entertainment	Steven Spielberg (director); Scott Frank, Jon Cohen (screenplay); Tom Cruise, Colin Farrell, Max von Sydow, Samantha Morton, Steve Harris, Neal McDonough, Patrick Kilpatrick, Jessica Capshaw, Kathryn Morris, Peter Stormare, Tim Blake Nelson, Daniel London, Tyler Patrick Jones, Cameron Diaz, Cameron Crowe, Paul Thomas Anderson, Michael Dickman, Matthew Dickman, Lois Smith, Jason Antoon, Mike Binder, Jessica Harper, Anna Maria Horsford, David Stifel	
J U N E	21	Sunshine State	Sony Pictures Classics	John Sayles (director/screenplay); Angela Bassett, Edie Falco, Jane Alexander, Alan King, Timothy Hutton, Mary Steenburgen, Bill Cobbs, Alex Lewis, Cullen Douglas, Clifton James, Eliot Asinof, James McDaniel, Perry Lang, Miguel Ferrer, Gordon Clapp, Mary Alice, Michael Greyeyes, Sam McMurray, Brett Rice, Marc Blucas, Charlayne Woodard, Tom Wright, Ralph Waite, Richard Edson, Ashley Brumby	
J U N E	28	The First $20 Million Is Always the Hardest	20th Century Fox	Mick Jackson (director); Jon Favreau, Gary Tieche (screenplay); Adam Garcia, Rosario Dawson, Jake Busey, Enrico Colantoni, Ethan Suplee, Anjul Nigam, Gregory Jbara, Dan Butler, Linda Hart, Shiva Rose, Chandra West, Robert Patrick Benedict, Heather Paige Kent, John M. Rothman, Reggie Lee, Dagney Kerr, Jerry M. Haleva, Katie Lohmann, Stephen Blackehart, Jesse Heiman	
J U N E	28	Hey Arnold!: The Movie	Paramount Pictures / Nickelodeon Movies	Tuck Tucker (director); Craig Bartlett, Steve Viksten (screenplay); Spencer Klein, Francesca Marie Smith, Jamil Walker Smith, Dan Castellaneta, Tress MacNeille, Paul Sorvino, Jennifer Jason Leigh, Christopher Lloyd, Maurice LaMarche, Sam Gifaldi, Olivia Hack, Blake McIver Ewing, Anndi McAfee, Justin Shenkarow, Vincent Schiavelli, Kath Soucie, Elizabeth Ashley, Steve Viksten, Dom Irrera, Baoan Coleman, Craig Bartlett, Robert Torti, Bobby Edner, Christopher P. Walberg, James Keane, Michael Levin	
J U N E	28	Mr. Deeds	Columbia Pictures / New Line Cinema	Steven Brill (director); Tim Herlihy (screenplay); Adam Sandler, Winona Ryder, Peter Gallagher, Jared Harris, Allen Covert, John Turturro, Erick Avari, Rob Schneider, Peter Dante, Conchata Ferrell, Harve Presnell, Steve Buscemi, Blake Clark, John McEnroe, Radio Man, Jennifer Tisdale, Al Sharpton, J.B. Smoove, Walter Williamson, Roark Critchlow, George Wallace, Aloma Wright, Billy St. John, Brandon Molale	
J U N E	28	Pumpkin	United Artists / American Zoetrope	Anthony Abrams (director); Adam Larson Broder (director/screenplay); Christina Ricci, Hank Harris, Brenda Blethyn, Dominique Swain, Marisa Coughlan, Sam Ball, Harry J. Lennix, Nina Foch, Caroline Aaron, Lisa Banes, Julio Oscar Mechoso, Phil Reeves, Marisa Parker, Tait Smith, Michael Bacall, Erinn Bartlett, Michelle Krusiec, Melissa McCarthy, Amy Adams, Shaun Weiss, Julia Vera, Shane Johnson, Margaret Travolta, Beverly Lynne	

== July–September ==
Opening		Title	Production company	Cast and crew	Ref.
J U L Y	3	Like Mike	20th Century Fox	John Schultz (director); Michael Elliot, Jordan Moffet (screenplay); Lil' Bow Wow, Brenda Song, Morris Chestnut, Jonathan Lipnicki, Crispin Glover, Robert Forster, Eugene Levy, Jesse Plemons, Julius Ritter, Anne Meara, Fred Armisen, Julie Brown, Vanessa Williams, John Marshall Jones, Reginald VelJohnson, Valarie Pettiford, Reggie Theus, Geoff Witcher, Roger Morrissey, Vince Carter, Michael Finley, Steve Francis, Allen Iverson, Jason Kidd, Desmond Mason, Alonzo Mourning, Tracy McGrady, Steve Nash, Dirk Nowitzki, Gary Payton, Jason Richardson, David Robinson, Gerald Wallace, Rasheed Wallace, Chris Webber, Tom Tolbert, Hannah Storm, Ahmad Rashad, Kenny Mayne, Rich Eisen, Pat Croce	
J U L Y	3	Men in Black II	Columbia Pictures / Amblin Entertainment	Barry Sonnenfeld (director); Robert Gordon, Barry Fanaro (screenplay); Tommy Lee Jones, Will Smith, Rip Torn, Lara Flynn Boyle, Johnny Knoxville, Rosario Dawson, Tony Shalhoub, Patrick Warburton, Jack Kehler, David Cross, Colombe Jacobsen, Peter Spellos, Michael Rivkin, Michael Bailey Smith, Lenny Venito, Jay Johnston, Joel McKinnon Miller, Derek Cecil, Marty Belafsky, Rick Baker, Martha Stewart, Michael Jackson, Nick Cannon, Jeremy Howard, Mary Stein, Martin Klebba, Ernie Grunwald, Doug Jones, Biz Markie, Peter Graves, Barry Sonnenfeld, Kevin Grevioux, Derek Mears, Tim Blaney, Greg Ballora, Richard Pearson, Thomas Rosales Jr., John Alexander, Linda Kim, Paige Brooks, Brad Abrell, Thom Fountain, Carl J. Johnson	
J U L Y	3	The Powerpuff Girls Movie	Warner Bros. Pictures / Cartoon Network Studios	Craig McCracken (director/screenplay); Charlie Bean, Lauren Faust, Paul Rudish, Don Shank (screenplay); Cathy Cavadini, Tara Strong, E.G. Daily, Roger L. Jackson, Tom Kane, Tom Kenny, Jennifer Hale, Jennifer Martin, Jeff Bennett, Grey DeLisle, Phil LaMarr, Rob Paulsen, Kevin Michael Richardson, Frank Welker	
J U L Y	12	The Crocodile Hunter: Collision Course	Metro-Goldwyn-Mayer	John Stainton (director); Holly Goldberg Sloan (screenplay); Steve Irwin, Terri Irwin, Neil Fanning, Magda Szubanski, David Wenham, Lachy Hulme, Aden Young, Steve Bastoni, Kenneth Ransom, Steve Vidler, Kate Beahan, Robert Coleby, Timothy Bottoms, Bindi Irwin, Sui	
J U L Y	12	Halloween: Resurrection	Dimension Films	Rick Rosenthal (director); Larry Brand, Sean Hood (screenplay); Busta Rhymes, Bianca Kajlich, Thomas Ian Nicholas, Ryan Merriman, Sean Patrick Thomas, Tyra Banks, Jamie Lee Curtis, Brad Loree, Daisy McCrackin, Katee Sackhoff, Luke Kirby, Lorena Gale, Brad Sihvon, Rick Rosenthal, Haig Sutherland, Marisa Rudiak, Brent Chapman, Dan Joffre, Gus Lynch	
J U L Y	12	Reign of Fire	Touchstone Pictures / Spyglass Entertainment	Rob Bowman (director); Gregg Chabot, Kevin Peterka, Matt Greenberg (screenplay); Christian Bale, Matthew McConaughey, Izabella Scorupco, Gerard Butler, Alice Krige, David Kennedy, Alexander Siddig, Ned Dennehy, Karl Pilkington, Doug Cockle, Jack Gleeson, Scott Moutter, Rory Keenan, Terence Maynard, Randall Carlton, Chris Kelly, Ben Thornton	
J U L Y	12	Road to Perdition	DreamWorks / 20th Century Fox	Sam Mendes (director); David Self (screenplay); Tom Hanks, Paul Newman, Jude Law, Jennifer Jason Leigh, Daniel Craig, Stanley Tucci, Liam Aiken, Dylan Baker, Ciarán Hinds, Tyler Hoechlin, Kerry Rossall, David Darlow, Anthony LaPaglia, Kevin Chamberlin, Harry Groener, JoBe Cerny	
J U L Y	17	Eight Legged Freaks	Warner Bros. Pictures / Village Roadshow Pictures	Ellory Elkayem (director/screenplay); Jesse Alexander (screenplay); David Arquette, Kari Wührer, Scarlett Johansson, Doug E. Doug, Scott Terra, Rick Overton, Leon Rippy, Matt Czuchry, Jay Arlen Jones, Eileen Ryan, Riley Smith, Tom Noonan, Matt Holwick, Jane Edith Wilson, Jack Moore, Roy Gaintner, Don Champlin, John Christopher Storey, David Earl Waterman	
J U L Y	19	K-19: The Widowmaker	Paramount Pictures / Intermedia Films / National Geographic Feature Films	Kathryn Bigelow (director); Christopher Kyle (screenplay); Harrison Ford, Liam Neeson, Peter Sarsgaard, Joss Ackland, John Shrapnel, Donald Sumpter, Tim Woodward, Steve Nicolson, Ravil Isyanov, Christian Camargo, George Anton, James Francis Ginty, Lex Shrapnel, Ingvar Eggert Sigurðsson, Sam Spruell, Sam Redford, Peter Stebbings, Shaun Benson, Kristen Holden-Ried, Dmitry Chepovetsky, Tygh Runyan, Jacob Pitts, Michael Gladis, JJ Feild, Peter Oldring, Joshua Close, Jeremy Akerman	
J U L Y	19	Stuart Little 2	Columbia Pictures	Rob Minkoff (director); Bruce Joel Rubin (screenplay); Michael J. Fox, Melanie Griffith, Nathan Lane, Hugh Laurie, Geena Davis, Jonathan Lipnicki, James Woods, Steve Zahn, Anna and Ashley Hoelck, Marc John Jefferies, Jim Doughan, Brad Garrett, Amelia Marshall, Maria Bamford	
J U L Y	23	Tarzan & Jane	Walt Disney Home Entertainment	Victor Cook, Steve Loter (directors); Mirith J. Colao, John Behnke, Rob Humphrey, Jim Peterson, Jess Winfield (screenplay); Michael T. Weiss, Olivia d'Abo, Jeff Bennett, Jim Cummings, April Winchell, René Auberjonois, Grey DeLisle, Alexis Denisof, John O'Hurley, Phil Proctor, Nicollette Sheridan, Tara Strong, Frank Welker, Greg Ellis, Kevin Michael Richardson	
J U L Y	26	Austin Powers in Goldmember	New Line Cinema	Jay Roach (director); Mike Myers, Michael McCullers (screenplay); Mike Myers, Beyoncé Knowles, Michael Caine, Seth Green, Michael York, Robert Wagner, Mindy Sterling, Verne Troyer, Rob Lowe, Fred Savage, Aaron Himelstein, Josh Zuckerman, Eddie Adams, Scott Aukerman, Evan Farmer, Brian Tee, Masi Oka, Clint Howard, Michael McDonald, Donna D'Errico, Fred Stoller, Greg Grunberg, Kinga Philipps, Kevin Stea, Anna-Marie Goddard, Nina Kaczorowski, Nikki Ziering, Ming Tea, Rachel Roberts, Susanna Hoffs, Matthew Sweet, Christopher Ward, Carrie Ann Inaba, Diane Mizota, Tommy "Tiny" Lister Jr., Kristen Johnston, Neil Mullarkey, Nobu Matsuhisa, Peter "Navy" Tuiasosopo, Heather Graham, Tom Cruise, Danny DeVito, Gwyneth Paltrow, Kevin Spacey, Steven Spielberg, Quincy Jones, John Travolta, Britney Spears, Ozzy Osbourne, Sharon Osbourne, Kelly Osbourne, Jack Osbourne, Willie Nelson, Burt Bacharach, Nathan Lane, Katie Couric	
J U L Y	26	The Country Bears	Walt Disney Pictures	Peter Hastings (director); Mark Perez (screenplay); Christopher Walken, Haley Joel Osment, Diedrich Bader, Candy Ford, James Gammon, Brad Garrett, Toby Huss, Kevin Michael Richardson, Stephen Root, Stephen Tobolowsky, Daryl 'Chill' Mitchell, M. C. Gainey, Alex Rocco, Meagen Fay, Eli Marienthal, Queen Latifah, Chip Chinery, Jess Harnell, Paul Rugg, Jennifer Paige, Krystal Marie Harris, Don Henley, Wyclef Jean, Elton John, Willie Nelson, Bonnie Raitt, Brian Setzer, Don Was, Xzibit, Julianne Buescher, Alice Dinnean, Terri Hardin, John Kennedy, Bruce Lanoil, Michelan Sisti, Allan Trautman, John Alexander, E. G. Daily, Colin Hay, John Hiatt	
J U L Y	26	Who Is Cletis Tout?	Paramount Classics / Fireworks Pictures	Chris Ver Wiel (director/screenplay); Christian Slater, Richard Dreyfuss, Tim Allen, Portia de Rossi, RuPaul, Billy Connolly, Peter MacNeill, Bill MacDonald, Tim Progosh, Richard Chevolleau, Elias Zarou, Shawn Doyle, Tony Nappo, Danny Lima	
A U G U S T	2	Full Frontal	Miramax Films	Steven Soderbergh (director); Coleman Hough (screenplay); David Duchovny, Nicky Katt, Catherine Keener, Mary McCormack, David Hyde Pierce, Julia Roberts, Blair Underwood, Enrico Colantoni, Erika Alexander, Tracy Vilar, Brandon Keener, Jeff Garlin, David Alan Basche, Terence Stamp, Nancy Lenehan, Brad Rowe, David Fincher, Jerry Weintraub, Rainn Wilson, Eddie McClintock, Dina Waters, Sandra Oh, Justina Machado, Meagen Fay, Joe Chrest, Wayne Pére, January Jones, Patrick Fischler, Cynthia Gibb, Andrew Connolly, Brad Pitt, Rashida Jones, Steven Soderbergh	
A U G U S T	2	Martin Lawrence Live: Runteldat	Paramount Pictures / MTV Films / Runteldat Entertainment	David Raynr (director); Martin Lawrence (screenplay); Martin Lawrence	
A U G U S T	2	The Master of Disguise	Columbia Pictures / Revolution Studios	Perry Andelin Blake (director); Dana Carvey, Harris Goldberg (screenplay); Dana Carvey, Jennifer Esposito, Harold Gould, James Brolin, Brent Spiner, Edie McClurg, Maria Canals Barrera, Michael Bailey Smith, Kenan Thompson, Jay Johnston, Mitch Silpa, Virginia Hawkins, Jessica Simpson, Jonathan Loughran, Ted Rooney, Erick Avari, Michael DeLuise, Larry Cedar, Vincent Castellanos, Kevin Nealon, Chao-Li Chi, Michael Johnson, Bo Derek, Cole Sprouse, Dylan Sprouse, Naya Rivera, Leland Crooke, Paula Abdul, Lisa Foiles, Shane Lyons, Kyle Sullivan, Jesse Ventura, Vincent Riverside, Austin Wolff, Mark Devine, Mark Ginther, Carrick O'Quinn, John Tenn, Gabriel Pimental, Andy Morrow, Julius Ritter, Dane Morris	
A U G U S T	2	Signs	Touchstone Pictures / Blinding Edge Pictures	M. Night Shyamalan (director/screenplay); Mel Gibson, Joaquin Phoenix, Rory Culkin, Abigail Breslin, Cherry Jones, M. Night Shyamalan, Patricia Kalember, Ted Sutton, Merritt Wever, Lanny Flaherty, Marion McCorry, Michael Showalter, Clifford David, Kevin Pires	
A U G U S T	2	Tadpole	Miramax Films	Gary Winick (director); Heather McGowan, Niels Mueller (screenplay); Sigourney Weaver, John Ritter, Bebe Neuwirth, Aaron Stanford, Robert Iler, Kate Mara, Adam LeFevre, Ron Rifkin, Peter Appel, Alicia Van Couvering, Paul Bulter, Hope Chernov, John Feltch	
A U G U S T	6	The Adventures of Tom Thumb and Thumbelina	Buena Vista Home Entertainment	Glenn Chaika (director); Willard Carroll (screenplay); Elijah Wood, Jennifer Love Hewitt, Peter Gallagher, Jon Stewart, Rachel Griffiths, Robert Guillaume, Jane Leeves, Alexandra Boyd, Emma Samms, Esai Morales, Yvette Freeman, Michael Chiklis, Bebe Neuwirth, Yul Vazquez, Jack Johnson, Brad Kane, John Patrick White	
A U G U S T	7	The Good Girl	Fox Searchlight Pictures	Miguel Arteta (director); Mike White (screenplay); Jennifer Aniston, Jake Gyllenhaal, John C. Reilly, Tim Blake Nelson, Zooey Deschanel, Mike White, John Carroll Lynch, Deborah Rush, Aimee Garcia	
A U G U S T	7	Spy Kids 2: The Island of Lost Dreams	Dimension Films / Troublemaker Studios	Robert Rodriguez (director/screenplay); Antonio Banderas, Carla Gugino, Alexa Vega, Daryl Sabara, Matt O'Leary, Emily Osment, Steve Buscemi, Mike Judge, Ricardo Montalbán, Holland Taylor, Cheech Marin, Danny Trejo, Christopher McDonald, Taylor Momsen, Alan Cumming, Tony Shalhoub, Bill Paxton, Angela Lanza	
A U G U S T	9	Blood Work	Warner Bros. Pictures	Clint Eastwood (director); Brian Helgeland (screenplay); Clint Eastwood, Jeff Daniels, Anjelica Huston, Wanda De Jesus, Tina Lifford, Paul Rodriguez, Dylan Walsh, Rick Hoffman, Alix Koromzay, Igor Jijikine, Dina Eastwood, Beverly Leech, Maria Quiban, Brent Hinkley	
A U G U S T	9	XXX	Columbia Pictures / Revolution Studios	Rob Cohen (director); Rich Wilkes (screenplay); Vin Diesel, Asia Argento, Marton Csokas, Samuel L. Jackson, William Hope, Danny Trejo, Michael Roof, Richy Müller, Werner Daehn, Petr Jákl, Jan Pavel Filipensky, Tom Everett, Thomas Ian Griffith, Eve, Leila Arcieri, Rammstein, Tony Hawk, Mike Vallely, Matt Hoffman, Josh Todd	
A U G U S T	11	Issues 101	Triangle Pillar Group / Ariztical Entertainment	John Lincoln (director/screenplay); Kelly Clarkson	
A U G U S T	16	The Adventures of Pluto Nash	Warner Bros. Pictures / Castle Rock Entertainment / Village Roadshow Pictures	Ron Underwood (director); Neil Cuthbert (screenplay); Eddie Murphy, Randy Quaid, Rosario Dawson, Joe Pantoliano, Jay Mohr, Luis Guzmán, James Rebhorn, Pam Grier, Burt Young, Peter Boyle, John Cleese, Lillo Brancato, Victor Varnado, Miguel A. Núñez Jr., Illeana Douglas, Mark Camacho, Alec Baldwin, Serge Houde, Alissa Kramer, Heidi Kramer, Stu "Large" Riley, Terry Haig, Cornelia Sharpe	
A U G U S T	16	The Princess and the Pea	Swan Productions	Mark Swan (director); Ken Cromar, Forrest S. Baker (screenplay); Amanda Waving, Steven Webb, Dan Finnerty, Nigel Lambert, Lincoln Hoppe, Ronan Vibert	
A U G U S T	16	Blue Crush	Universal Pictures / Imagine Entertainment	John Stockwell (director/screenplay); Lizzy Weiss (screenplay); Kate Bosworth, Michelle Rodriguez, Matthew Davis, Sanoe Lake, Mika Boorem, Faizon Love, Keala Kennelly, Carol Anne Philips, Coco Ho, Rochelle Ballard, Layne Beachley, Megan Abubo, Brian Keaulana, Tom Holland, Jamie O'Brien, Bruce Irons, Makua Rothman	
A U G U S T	16	The Kid Stays in the Picture	USA Films	Nanette Burstein, Brett Morgen (directors/screenplay); Robert Evans, Eddie Albert, Peter Bart, Charlie Bluhdorn, Bill Castle, Francis Ford Coppola, Catherine Deneuve, Josh Evans, Mia Farrow, Errol Flynn, Ava Gardner, Ernest Hemingway, Arthur Miller, Henry Kissinger, Ali MacGraw, Steve McQueen, Edward R. Murrow, Jack Nicholson, Roman Polanski, Tyrone Power, Mario Puzo, Roy Radin, Norma Shearer, Dinah Shore, Frank Sinatra, David Susskind, Irving Thalberg, Darryl F. Zanuck, Steve Allen, Pedro Almodóvar, Ursula Andress, Scott Baio, Warren Beatty, Carol Burnett, James Caan, James Cagney, John Cassavetes, Carol Channing, James Coburn, John Davidson, Angie Dickinson, Mike Douglas, Faye Dunaway, Clint Eastwood, Peter Falk, Richard Gere, Ruth Gordon, Gene Hackman, Gregory Harrison, Dustin Hoffman, Bob Hope, Olivia Hussey, Walter Matthau, Paul Newman, Mike Nichols, Richard Nixon, Ryan O'Neal, Laurence Olivier, Al Pacino, Dana Plato, Robert Redford, Robert Shapiro, Tommy Steele, Cheryl Tiegs, Robert Towne, John Travolta, Kathleen Turner, Hervé Villechaize, Chris Wallace, Raquel Welch, Leonard Whiting, Richard Widmark, Robin Williams, Debra Winger	
A U G U S T	16	Possession	Focus Features	Neil LaBute (director/screenplay); David Henry Hwang, Laura Jones (screenplay); Aaron Eckhart, Gwyneth Paltrow, Jeremy Northam, Jennifer Ehle, Lena Headey, Toby Stephens, Holly Aird, Tom Hollander, Trevor Eve, Tom Hickey, Georgia Mackenzie, Graham Crowden, Anna Massey, Craig Crosbie, Christopher Good, Elodie Frenck, Shelley Conn, Hugh Simon, Richard Heffer, Holly Earl, Kate O'Toole, Meg Wynn Owen, Roger Hammond, Henry Ian Cusick	
A U G U S T	18	Kermit's Swamp Years	Columbia TriStar Home Entertainment / Jim Henson Home Entertainment	David Gumpel (director); Jim Lewis, Joseph Mazzarino (screenplay); Steve Whitmire, Bill Barretta, Joseph Mazzarino, John Kennedy, Alice Dinnean, Dave Goelz, Jerry Nelson, John Hostetter, Cree Summer, Kelly Collins Lintz, William Bookston, Christian Kebbel	
A U G U S T	21	Hysterical Blindness	HBO Films	Mira Nair (director); Laura Cahill (screenplay); Uma Thurman, Gena Rowlands, Juliette Lewis, Justin Chambers, Ben Gazzara, Anthony DeSando, Jolie Peters, Callie Thorne, Lisa Altomare, Laura Cahill, Johann Carlo, Alex Draper, Russell Gibson, Jayne Haynes, Susan Isaacs, Ali Marsh, Wade Mylius, Bobby Tisdale, Susan Varon	
A U G U S T	21	One Hour Photo	Fox Searchlight Pictures	Mark Romanek (director/screenplay); Robin Williams, Connie Nielsen, Michael Vartan, Dylan Smith, Gary Cole, Eriq La Salle, Erin Daniels, Clark Gregg, Paul H. Kim, David Moreland, Jim Rash, Nick Searcy	
A U G U S T	23	Serving Sara	Paramount Pictures / Mandalay Pictures	Reginald Hudlin (director); Jay Scherick, David Ronn (screenplay); Matthew Perry, Elizabeth Hurley, Bruce Campbell, Vincent Pastore, Cedric the Entertainer, Amy Adams, Terry Crews, Jerry Stiller, Marshall Bell, Joe Viterelli, Vince Cecere, Tony Longo, Alaina Huffman, Mary Lyons, Coati Mundi, Julio Cesar Cedillo, Andrew Wilson	
A U G U S T	23	Simone	New Line Cinema	Andrew Niccol (director/screenplay); Al Pacino, Catherine Keener, Pruitt Taylor Vince, Jay Mohr, Evan Rachel Wood, Rachel Roberts, Winona Ryder, Jason Schwartzman, Claudia Jordan, Elias Koteas, Rebecca Romijn, Joel Heyman, Benjamin Salisbury, Darnell Williams, Jim Rash, Ron Perkins, Jeffrey Pierce, Mitzi Martin, Jolie Jenkins, Adrian R'Mante, James Gleason, Mark Thompson, Chris Coppola, Lombardo Boyar, Jenni Blong, Hal Ozsan, Stanley Anderson, Daniel von Bargen, Charles Noland	
A U G U S T	23	Undisputed	Miramax Films / Millennium Films	Walter Hill (director/screenplay); David Giler (screenplay); Wesley Snipes, Ving Rhames, Peter Falk, Michael Rooker, Jon Seda, Wes Studi, Fisher Stevens, Master P, Silkk the Shocker, C-Murder, Ed Lover, Michael Bailey Smith, Dayton Callie, Denis Arndt, Bruce A. Young, Amy Aquino, Susan Dalian, Rose Rollins, Peter Jason, Maureen O'Boyle, Jim Lampley, Byron Minns, Steve Heinze, Nils Allen Stewart, Johnathan Wesley Wallace, Johnny Williams, Joe D'Angerio, Taylor Young,	
A U G U S T	30	FeardotCom	Warner Bros. Pictures / Franchise Pictures	William Malone (director); Moshe Diamant, Josephine Coyle (screenplay); Stephen Dorff, Natascha McElhone, Stephen Rea, Udo Kier, Amelia Curtis, Jeffrey Combs, Nigel Terry, Gesine Cukrowski, Michael Sarrazin, Anna Thalbach, Siobhan Flynn, Joan McBride, Elizabeth McKechnie, Arnita Swanson, Gordon Peters, Nils Brunkhorst, Sven Pippig, Anja Van Greuningen, Anjelika Khromova, Matthias Schweighöfer, Birthe Wolter	
S E P T E M B E R	3	Mickey's House of Villains	Walt Disney Home Entertainment	Rick Calabash, Jamie Mitchell, Tony Craig, Mike Moon (directors); Roberts Gannaway (director/screenplay); Henry Gilroy, Jymn Magon, Thomas Hart, Kevin Campbell, Elizabeth Stonecipher (screenplay); Wayne Allwine, Russi Taylor, Tony Anselmo, Bill Farmer, Jason Marsden, Scott Weinger, Tress MacNeille, Jonathan Freeman, Gilbert Gottfried, Corey Burton, Susanne Blakeslee, Pat Carroll, James Woods, Bobcat Goldthwait, Matt Frewer, Rob Paulsen, Jim Cummings, Lois Nettleton, John Cleese, John Fiedler, April Winchell, Rod Roddy, Kevin Michael Richardson, Amick Byram, Walt Disney, Pinto Colvig, June Foray, Clarence Nash, Billy Bletcher	
S E P T E M B E R	6	City by the Sea	Warner Bros. Pictures / Franchise Pictures	Michael Caton-Jones (director); Ken Hixon (screenplay); Robert De Niro, Frances McDormand, James Franco, Eliza Dushku, William Forsythe, Patti LuPone, Anson Mount, John Doman, Brian Tarantina, Drena De Niro, Michael P. Moran, Nestor Serrano, Matthew Cowles, Linda Emond, George Dzundza, Leo Burmester, Gregg Edelman, Mark LaMura, Michael Caton-Jones, Cyrus Farmer, Jay Boryea, Jason Winther, Orlando Pabjoy, Leslie Cohen, Stephi Lineburg, Jill Marie Lawrence, Michael Della Femina	
S E P T E M B E R	6	Swimfan	20th Century Fox	John Polson (director); Charles Bohl, Phillip Schneider (screenplay); Jesse Bradford, Erika Christensen, Shiri Appleby, Kate Burton, Dan Hedaya, Clayne Crawford, Jason Ritter, Kia Joy Goodwin, Michael Higgins, Nick Sandow, Pamela Isaacs, Phyllis Somerville, Monroe Mann	
S E P T E M B E R	13	Barbershop	Metro-Goldwyn-Mayer	Tim Story (director); Mark Brown, Don D. Scott, Marshall Todd (screenplay); Ice Cube, Anthony Anderson, Sean Patrick Thomas, Eve, Troy Garity, Michael Ealy, Leonard Earl Howze, Keith David, Cedric the Entertainer, Lahmard Tate, Jazsmin Lewis, Tom Wright, Sonya Eddy, Jason Winston George, DeRay Davis, Parvesh Cheena, Carl Wright, Kevyn Morrow, Norm Van Lier, Jalen Rose, Lorenzo Clemons, Deon Cole, Eric Lane, Janina Gavankar	
S E P T E M B E R	13	Igby Goes Down	Metro-Goldwyn-Mayer / United Artists / Atlantic Streamline	Burr Steers (director/screenplay); Kieran Culkin, Claire Danes, Jeff Goldblum, Bill Pullman, Susan Sarandon, Ryan Philippe, Bill Irwin, Jared Harris, Amanda Peet, Celia Weston, Cynthia Nixon, Jim Gaffigan, Gore Vidal, Gregory Itzin, Rory Culkin, Kathleen Gati, Eric Bogosian, Glenn Fitzgerald, Reg Rogers, Danny Tamberelli	
S E P T E M B E R	13	Stealing Harvard	Columbia Pictures / Revolution Studios / Imagine Entertainment	Bruce McCulloch (director); Martin Hynes, Peter Tolan (screenplay); Jason Lee, Tom Green, Leslie Mann, Dennis Farina, Richard Jenkins, John C. McGinley, Tammy Blanchard, Megan Mullally, Chris Penn, Seymour Cassel, Martin Starr, Bruce McCulloch, Jeanette Miller, Pamela Gordon, Tracy Ryan, Marshall Manesh, Nick Offerman, Paul Feig, Don "The Dragon" Wilson, Thomas Rosales Jr., Ernie Grunwald, Steffiana de la Cruz, Geoffrey Gould, Glenn Shadix	
S E P T E M B E R	20	Apollo 13 (re-release) (IMAX version)	Universal Pictures / Imagine Entertainment	Ron Howard (director); William Broyles Jr., Al Reinert (screenplay); Tom Hanks, Kevin Bacon, Bill Paxton, Gary Sinise, Ed Harris, Kathleen Quinlan, Mary Kate Schellhardt, Emily Ann Lloyd, Miko Hughes, Max Elliott Slade, Jean Speegle Howard, Tracy Reiner, David Andrews, Michele Little, Chris Ellis, Joe Spano, Xander Berkeley, Marc McClure, Clint Howard, Loren Dean, Tom Wood, Ray McKinnon, Max Grodénchik, Christian Clemenson, Brett Cullen, Ned Vaughn, Andy Milder, Geoffrey Blake, Wayne Duvall, Jim Meskimen, Joseph Culp, Todd Louiso, Gabriel Jarret, Christopher John Fields, Endre Hules, Meadow Williams, Brian Markinson, Austin O'Brien, Thom Barry, Carl Gabriel Yorke, Rance Howard, J.J. Chaback, Todd Hallowell, Roger Corman, Jack Conley, Jeffrey S. Kluger, Herbert Jefferson Jr., John Dullaghan, John Wheeler, Paul Mantee, Neil Armstrong, Jules Bergman, Pope Paul VI, Walter Cronkite, Bryce Dallas Howard, Chet Huntley, Chauntal Lewis, Jim Lovell, Marilyn Lovell	
S E P T E M B E R	20	Ballistic: Ecks vs. Sever	Warner Bros. Pictures / Franchise Pictures	Wych Kaosayananda (director); Alan B. McElroy (screenplay); Antonio Banderas, Lucy Liu, Gregg Henry, Ray Park, Talisa Soto, Miguel Sandoval, Terry Chen, Roger R. Cross, Sandrine Holt, Steve Bacic, Tony Alcantar, Aidan Drummond, David Palffy, David Pearson, Jordan Rafael, Brian Drummond, Joel Kramer, John DeSantis, Charles Andre, Mike Dopud, Jonathan Kelly	
S E P T E M B E R	20	The Banger Sisters	Fox Searchlight Pictures	Bob Dolman (director/screenplay); Goldie Hawn, Susan Sarandon, Geoffrey Rush, Erika Christensen, Robin Thomas, Eva Amurri, Matthew Carey, Andre Ware, Kohl Sudduth, Tinsley Grimes, Buckcherry	
S E P T E M B E R	20	The Four Feathers	Paramount Pictures / Miramax Films	Shekhar Kapur (director); Mark Pellington, Bruce Joel Rubin, Greg Brooker, Michael Schiffer, Risa Bramon Garcia, Hossein Amini (screenplay); Heath Ledger, Wes Bentley, Djimon Hounsou, Kate Hudson, Rupert Penry-Jones, Kris Marshall, Michael Sheen, Alex Jennings, James Cosmo, Angela Douglas, Tim Pigott-Smith, Lucy Gordon, James Hillier	
S E P T E M B E R	20	Secretary	Lions Gate Films	Steven Shainberg (director); Erin Cressida Wilson (screenplay); James Spader, Maggie Gyllenhaal, Jeremy Davies, Lesley Ann Warren, Stephen McHattie, Jessica Tuck, Patrick Bauchau, Amy Locane, Oz Perkins, Michael Mantell, Sabrina Grdevich, Ezra Buzzington	
S E P T E M B E R	20	Spirited Away	Walt Disney Pictures / Studio Ghibli	Hayao Miyazaki (director/screenplay); Daveigh Chase, David Ogden Stiers, Jason Marsden, Suzanne Pleshette, Susan Egan, Paul Eiding, John Ratzenberger, Bob Bergen, Rodger Bumpass, Tara Strong, Michael Chiklis, Lauren Holly, Jim Ward, Jack Angel, Mickie McGowan, Sherry Lynn, Mona Marshall, Candi Milo, Colleen O'Shaughnessey, Jennifer Darling, Phil Proctor, Dee Bradley Baker	
S E P T E M B E R	20	Trapped	Columbia Pictures	Luis Mandoki (director); Greg Iles (screenplay); Charlize Theron, Courtney Love, Stuart Townsend, Kevin Bacon, Dakota Fanning, Pruitt Taylor Vince, Colleen Camp, Steve Rankin, Garry Chalk, Jodie Markell, Matt Koby, Gerry Becker, Andrew Airlie, J.B. Bivens, Gregory Bennett	
S E P T E M B E R	27	Just a Kiss	Paramount Classics	Fisher Stevens (director); Patrick Breen (screenplay); Ron Eldard, Kyra Sedgwick, Marisa Tomei, Marley Shelton, Taye Diggs, Sarita Choudhury, Patrick Breen, Zoe Caldwell, Peter Dinklage, Idina Menzel, Ron Rifkin, Donna Hanover, Kelly Cole, Bruno Amato, José Alvarez, Christina Russo	
S E P T E M B E R	27	Sweet Home Alabama	Touchstone Pictures	Andy Tennant (director); C. Jay Cox (screenplay); Reese Witherspoon, Josh Lucas, Patrick Dempsey, Candice Bergen, Mary Kay Place, Fred Ward, Jean Smart, Ethan Embry, Melanie Lynskey, Courtney Gains, Mary Lynn Rajskub, Dakota Fanning, Thomas Curtis, Rhona Mitra, Nathan Lee Graham, Sean Bridgers, Kevin Sussman, Michelle Krusiec, Mark Matkevich, Afemo Omilami, Leslie Hendrix, Colin Ford, Andrew Prine, Fleet Cooper, Mark Skinner, Phil Cater, Michael Snow, Bob Penny, Lee Roy Giles	
S E P T E M B E R	27	The Tuxedo	DreamWorks	Kevin Donovan (director); Michael J. Wilson, Michael J. Leeson (screenplay); Jackie Chan, Jennifer Love Hewitt, Jason Isaacs, Debi Mazar, Ritchie Coster, Peter Stormare, Mia Cottet, Romany Malco, Daniel Kash, Jody Racicot, Boyd Banks, Bob Balaban, Christian Potenza, Scott Wickware, Karen Glave, Scott Yaphe, Jordan Madley, James Brown, Colin Mochrie, Noah Danby, Kim Roberts	

== October–December ==
Opening		Title	Production company	Cast and crew	Ref.
O C T O B E R	4	Jonah: A VeggieTales Movie	Big Idea Productions / Artisan Entertainment (As F.H.E. Pictures)	Phil Vischer, Mike Nawrocki (directors/screenplay); Phil Vischer, Mike Nawrocki, Tim Hodge, Lisa Vischer, Dan Anderson, Shelby Vischer, Kristin Blegen, Jim Poole	
O C T O B E R	4	Moonlight Mile	Touchstone Pictures / Hyde Park Entertainment	Brad Silberling (director/screenplay); Jake Gyllenhaal, Dustin Hoffman, Susan Sarandon, Holly Hunter, Ellen Pompeo, Dabney Coleman, Careena Melia, Roxanne Hart, Richard T. Jones, Alexia Landeau	
O C T O B E R	4	Red Dragon	Universal Pictures / Dino De Laurentiis Company	Brett Ratner (director); Ted Tally (screenplay); Anthony Hopkins, Edward Norton, Ralph Fiennes, Harvey Keitel, Emily Watson, Philip Seymour Hoffman, Mary-Louise Parker, Anthony Heald, Bill Duke, Ken Leung, Stanley Anderson, Frank Whaley, Frankie Faison, Tyler Patrick Jones, Azura Skye, Lalo Schifrin, John Rubinstein, Brenda Strong, Robert Curtis Brown, Marc Abraham, Veronica De Laurentiis, Michael Cavanaugh, Cliff Dorfman, Katie Rich, Tom Verica, Marguerite MacIntyre, Thomas Curtis, Alex D. Linz, William Lucking, Elizabeth Dennehy, Joseph Simmons, Gianni Russo, Al Brown, Jeanine Jackson, Mark Moses, Dwier Brown, Christopher Curry, Conrad E. Palmisano, Ellen Burstyn, Mary Beth Hurt, Lisa Thornhill, James Pickens Jr.	
O C T O B E R	11	Bowling for Columbine	Metro-Goldwyn-Mayer / United Artists / Alliance Atlantis	Michael Moore (director); Michael Moore	
O C T O B E R	11	Brown Sugar	Fox Searchlight Pictures	Rick Famuyiwa (director); Michael Elliot, Rick Famuyiwa (screenplay); Taye Diggs, Sanaa Lathan, Mos Def, Nicole Ari Parker, Boris Kodjoe, Queen Latifah, Wendell Pierce, Erik Weiner, Reggi Wyns, Venida Evans, Liza Lapira, Wyking Jones, Marc John Jefferies, Aaliyyah Hill, Big Daddy Kane, Kool G Rap, Pete Rock, De La Soul, Tariq Trotter, Jermaine Dupri, Talib Kweli, Common, Method Man, Slick Rick, Dana Dane, Doug E. Fresh, Questlove, Russell Simmons, Fabolous, Beanie Sigel, Angie Martinez, Kimora Lee	
O C T O B E R	11	Knockaround Guys	New Line Cinema	Brian Koppelman, David Levien (directors/screenplay); Barry Pepper, Seth Green, Vin Diesel, John Malkovich, Dennis Hopper, Arthur Nascarella, Tom Noonan, Nicholas Pasco, Shawn Doyle, Kevin Gage, John Liddle, Kris Lemche, Dov Tiefenbach, Catherine Finch, Ceciley Jenkins, Jennifer Baxter, Josh Mostel, Mike Starr, Charlotte Studey, Andrew Francis	
O C T O B E R	11	Pokémon 4Ever	Miramax Films / 4Kids Entertainment	Kunihiko Yuyama (director); Hideki Sonoda (screenplay); Veronica Taylor, Ikue Ōtani, Rachael Lillis, Eric Stuart, Satomi Kōrogi, Maddie Blaustein, Mika Kanai, Tara Jayne, Roxanne Beck, Kerry Williams, Dan Green, Kayzie Rogers, Russi Taylor, Masahiko Tanaka, Marc Thompson, Stan Hart, Ken Gates	
O C T O B E R	11	The Rules of Attraction	Lions Gate Films	Roger Avary (director/screenplay); James Van Der Beek, Shannyn Sossamon, Ian Somerhalder, Jessica Biel, Kate Bosworth, Kip Pardue, Clifton Collins Jr., Thomas Ian Nicholas, Faye Dunaway, Eric Stoltz, Fred Savage, Theresa Wayman, Jay Baruchel, Joel Michaely, Clare Kramer, Swoosie Kurtz, Ron Jeremy Hyatt, Paul Williams	
O C T O B E R	11	Swept Away	Screen Gems / CODI SpA / SKA Films	Guy Ritchie (director/screenplay); Madonna, Adriano Giannini, Bruce Greenwood, Jeanne Tripplehorn, Elizabeth Banks, Michael Beattie, David Thornton	
O C T O B E R	11	Tuck Everlasting	Walt Disney Pictures / Scholastic Enterprises	Jay Russell (director); Jeffrey Lieber, James V. Hart (screenplay); Alexis Bledel, William Hurt, Sissy Spacek, Jonathan Jackson, Scott Bairstow, Ben Kingsley, Victor Garber, Amy Irving, Julia Hart, Naomi Kline, Robert Luis, Elisabeth Shue	
O C T O B E R	11	White Oleander	Warner Bros. Pictures	Peter Kosminsky (director); Mary Agnes Donoghue (screenplay); Alison Lohman, Robin Wright Penn, Michelle Pfeiffer, Renée Zellweger, Billy Connolly, Patrick Fugit, Cole Hauser, Noah Wyle, Svetlana Efremova, Taryn Manning, Liz Stauber, Leila Kenzle, Kali Rocha, Allison Munn, Marc Donato, Amy Aquino, John Billingsley, Sam Catlin, Debra Christofferson, Cathy Ladman, Melissa McCarthy, Brian Mulligan, Samantha Shelton, Mark Soper, James 'Kimo' Wills, Biff Yeager	
O C T O B E R	18	Abandon	Paramount Pictures / Spyglass Entertainment	Stephen Gaghan (director/screenplay); Katie Holmes, Benjamin Bratt, Charlie Hunnam, Zooey Deschanel, Elizabeth Whitmere, Fred Ward, Mark Feuerstein, Melanie Lynskey, Philip Bosco, Gabriel Mann, Will McCormack, Gabrielle Union, Tony Goldwyn	
O C T O B E R	18	Auto Focus	Sony Pictures Classics	Paul Schrader (director); Michael Gerbosi (screenplay); Greg Kinnear, Willem Dafoe, Rita Wilson, Maria Bello, Ron Leibman, Michael E. Rodgers, Kurt Fuller, Grand L. Bush, Ed Begley Jr., Michael McKean, John Kapelos, Bruce Solomon, Don McManus, Kelly Packard, Kevin Kilner, Joe Grifasi, Vyto Ruginis, Alex Meneses, Arden Myrin, Joseph D. Reitman, Katie Lohmann, Catherine Dent, Christopher Neiman, Lyle Kanouse, Roderick L. McCarthy	
O C T O B E R	18	Real Women Have Curves	HBO Films / Newmarket Films / LaVoo Productions	Patricia Cardoso (director); George LaVoo, Josefina López (screenplay); America Ferrera, Lupe Ontiveros, Ingrid Oliu, George Lopez, Brian Sites, Soledad St. Hilarie, Lourdes Perez, Jorge Cervera Jr., Felipe de Alba, Jose Gerardo Zamora Jr., Edgar Lujan, Lina Acosta, Marlene Forte, Jimmy Ishida, Pete Leal, Josefina López, Jose Tolentino, Sandie Torres, Julia Vera, Minerva Garcia	
O C T O B E R	18	The Ring	DreamWorks	Gore Verbinski (director); Kôji Suzuki, Ehren Kruger, Scott Frank (screenplay); Naomi Watts, Martin Henderson, Brian Cox, David Dorfman, Daveigh Chase, Shannon Cochran, Jane Alexander, Lindsay Frost, Amber Tamblyn, Rachael Bella, Richard Lineback, Pauley Perrette, Sara Rue, Sasha Barrese, Adam Brody, Michael Spound, Chris Cooper, Joe Chrest	
O C T O B E R	18	Welcome to Collinwood	Warner Bros. Pictures / Pandora Cinema	Anthony Russo, Joe Russo (directors/screenplay); William H. Macy, Isaiah Washington, Sam Rockwell, Michael Jeter, Luis Guzmán, Patricia Clarkson, Andrew Davoli, George Clooney, David Warshofsky, Jennifer Esposito, Gabrielle Union	
O C T O B E R	25	Frida	Miramax Films	Julie Taymor (director); Clancy Sigal, Diane Lake, Gregory Nava, Anna Thomas (screenplay); Salma Hayek, Alfred Molina, Geoffrey Rush, Mia Maestro, Ashley Judd, Antonio Banderas, Edward Norton, Diego Luna, Margarita Sanz, Patricia Reyes Spindola, Roger Rees, Valeria Golino, Omar Rodriguez, Felipe Fulop, Saffron Burrows, Karine Plantadit-Bageot	
O C T O B E R	25	Ghost Ship	Warner Bros. Pictures / Village Roadshow Pictures / Dark Castle Entertainment	Steve Beck (director); Mark Hanlon, John Pogue (screenplay); Julianna Margulies, Ron Eldard, Desmond Harrington, Isaiah Washington, Gabriel Byrne, Karl Urban, Alex Dimitriades, Emily Browning, Francesca Rettondini, Monica Mancini, Boris Brkic, Bob Ruggiero, Iain Gardiner	
O C T O B E R	25	Jackass: The Movie	Paramount Pictures / MTV Films / Dickhouse Productions	Jeff Tremaine (director/screenplay); Spike Jonze, Johnny Knoxville, Bam Margera, Chris Pontius, Steve-O, Ryan Dunn, Dave England, Jason "Wee Man" Acuña, Preston Lacy, Ehren McGhehey, Brandon DiCamillo, Dimitry Elyashkevich, Whitey McConnaughy, Sean Cliver, Loomis Fall, Phil Clapp, Vernon Chatman (screenplay); Johnny Knoxville, Bam Margera, Chris Pontius, Steve-O, Ryan Dunn, Dave England, Jason "Wee Man" Acuña, Preston Lacy, Ehren McGhehey	
O C T O B E R	25	The Truth About Charlie	Universal Pictures	Jonathan Demme (director/screenplay); Steve Schmidt, Peter Joshua, Jessica Bendinger (screenplay); Mark Wahlberg, Thandie Newton, Tim Robbins, Ted Levine, LisaGay Hamilton, Stephen Dillane, Sakina Jaffrey, Christine Boisson, Simon Abkarian, Park Joong-hoon, Magali Noël, Agnes Varda, Charles Aznavour, Manno Charlemagne, Anna Karina, Kenneth Utt, Sotigui Kouyate, Paula Moore	
N O V E M B E R	1	Punch-Drunk Love	Columbia Pictures / Revolution Studios / New Line Cinema	Paul Thomas Anderson (director/screenplay); Adam Sandler, Emily Watson, Philip Seymour Hoffman, Luis Guzmán, Mary Lynn Rajskub, Robert Smigel, Don McManus, Karen Kilgariff, Jonathan Loughran	
N O V E M B E R	1	The Santa Clause 2	Walt Disney Pictures / Boxing Cat Films	Michael Lembeck (director); Don Rhymer, Cinco Paul, Ken Daurio, Ed Decter, John J. Strauss (screenplay); Tim Allen, Elizabeth Mitchell, David Krumholtz, Eric Lloyd, Judge Reinhold, Wendy Crewson, Liliana Mumy, Spencer Breslin, Aisha Tyler, Peter Boyle, Jay Thomas, Kevin Pollak, Art LaFleur, Michael Dorn, Molly Shannon, Alexander Pollock, Beverley Elliott, Kath Soucie, Bob Bergen, Danielle Woodman, Bryce Hodgson, Blu Mankuma, Myles Jeffrey	
N O V E M B E R	1	I Spy	Columbia Pictures	Betty Thomas (director); Cormac Wibberley, Marianne Wibberley, Jay Scherick, David Ronn (screenplay); Eddie Murphy, Owen Wilson, Famke Janssen, Malcolm McDowell, Gary Cole, Bill Mondy, Phill Lewis, Mike Dopud, Lynda Boyd, Dana Lee, Viv Leacock, Crystal Lowe, Darren Shahlavi, Gabor Demszky, Tate Taylor, Larry Merchant, Sugar Ray Leonard, Jimmy Lennon Jr., Joe Cortez	
N O V E M B E R	6	Femme Fatale	Warner Bros. Pictures	Brian De Palma (director/screenplay); Antonio Banderas, Rebecca Romijn-Stamos, Peter Coyote, Eriq Ebouaney, Edouard Montoute, Rie Rasmussen, Thierry Fremont, Gregg Henry, Eva Darlan, Fiona Curzon	
N O V E M B E R	8	8 Mile	Universal Pictures / Imagine Entertainment	Curtis Hanson (director); Scott Silver (screenplay); Eminem, Kim Basinger, Brittany Murphy, Mekhi Phifer, Anthony Mackie, Michael Shannon, Eugene Byrd, Evan Jones, Omar Benson Miller, De'Angelo Wilson, Taryn Manning, Proof, Xzibit, Obie Trice, John Singleton, Craig Chandler, Chloe Greenfield, Miz Korona, Brandon T. Jackson	
N O V E M B E R	8	Far from Heaven	Focus Features	Todd Haynes (director/screenplay); Julianne Moore, Dennis Quaid, Dennis Haysbert, Patricia Clarkson, Viola Davis, James Rebhorn, Michael Gaston, Celia Weston, Barbara Garrick, Bette Henritze, June Squibb, Ryan Ward, Lindsay Andretta, Jordan Puryear, J.B. Adams, Olivia Birkelund	
N O V E M B E R	15	Half Past Dead	Screen Gems / Franchise Pictures	Don Michael Paul (director/screenplay); Steven Seagal, Morris Chestnut, Ja Rule, Nia Peeples, Tony Plana, Kurupt, Michael "Bear" Taliferro, Claudia Christian, Linda Thorson, Bruce Weitz, Michael McGrady, Richard Bremmer, Hannes Jaenicke, Mo'Nique, Stephen J. Cannell, Matt Battaglia, William T. Bowers	
N O V E M B E R	15	Harry Potter and the Chamber of Secrets	Warner Bros. Pictures / Heyday Films	Chris Columbus (director); Steve Kloves (screenplay); Daniel Radcliffe, Rupert Grint, Emma Watson, Richard Harris, Maggie Smith, Robbie Coltrane, John Cleese, Tom Felton, Kenneth Branagh, Alan Rickman, Jason Isaacs, Richard Griffiths, Fiona Shaw, Julie Walters, Mark Willams, Warwick Davis, Christian Coulson, David Bradley, Bonnie Wright, Devon Murray, Adrian Rawlins, Geraldine Somerville, Shirley Henderson, Harry Melling, Toby Jones, James Phelps, Oliver Phelps, Chris Rankin, Matthew Lewis, Miriam Margoyles, Hugh Mitchell, Alfred Enoch, Sean Biggerstaff, Gemma Jones, Robert Hardy, Julian Glover	
N O V E M B E R	22	Die Another Day	Metro-Goldwyn-Mayer	Lee Tamahori (director); Neal Purvis, Robert Wade (screenplay); Pierce Brosnan, Halle Berry, Toby Stephens, Rick Yune, Rosamund Pike, Judi Dench, John Cleese, Michael Madsen, Samantha Bond, Colin Salmon, Will Yun Lee, Kenneth Tsang, Michael Gorevoy, Lawrence Makoare, Madonna, Ho Yi, Rachel Grant, Emilio Echevarria, Vincent Wong, Joaquin Martinez, Deborah Moore, Oliver Skeete	
N O V E M B E R	22	The Emperor's Club	Universal Pictures / Beacon Pictures	Michael Hoffman (director); Neil Tolkin (screenplay); Kevin Kline, Emile Hirsch, Embeth Davidtz, Rob Morrow, Edward Herrmann, Harris Yulin, Paul Dano, Jesse Eisenberg, Rishi Mehta, Caitlin O'Heaney, Joel Gretsch, Steven Culp, Patrick Dempsey, Rahul Khanna, Gabriel Millman, Tim Realbuto, Chris Morales, Luca Bigini, Michael Coppola, Sean Fredricks, Katherine O'Sullivan, Jimmy Walsh, Nick Hagelin	
N O V E M B E R	22	Friday After Next	New Line Cinema / Cube Vision	Marcus Raboy (director); Ice Cube (screenplay); Ice Cube, Mike Epps, John Witherspoon, Don 'D.C.' Curry, Anna Maria Horsford, Clifton Powell, Terry Crews, Katt Williams, K.D. Aubert, Maz Jobrani, Reggie Gaskins, Brian Stepanek, Rickey Smiley, Sommore, Gerry Bednob, Starletta DuPois, Bebe Drake, Joel McKinnon Miller, Chris Williams, Trina McGee-Davis, Khleo Thomas, Daniel Curtis Lee, Marc John Jefferies	
N O V E M B E R	22	The Quiet American	Miramax Films / Intermedia Films / Mirage Enterprises	Phillip Noyce (director); Christopher Hampton, Robert Schenkkan (screenplay); Michael Caine, Brendan Fraser, Do Thi Hai Yen, Rade Šerbedžija, Tzi Ma, Robert Stanton, Holmes Osborne, Quang Hai	
N O V E M B E R	27	Eight Crazy Nights	Columbia Pictures	Seth Kearsley (director); Adam Sandler, Allen Covert, Brooks Arthur, Brad Isaacs (screenplay); Adam Sandler, Jackie Titone, Austin Stout, Rob Schneider, Kevin Nealon, Norm Crosby, Jon Lovitz, Dylan and Cole Sprouse, Tyra Banks, Blake Clark, Peter Dante, Ellen Albertini Dow, Kevin Farley, Lari Friedman, Tom Kenny, Carl Weathers	
N O V E M B E R	27	Personal Velocity: Three Portraits	United Artists	Rebecca Miller (director/screenplay); Kyra Sedgwick, Parker Posey, Fairuza Balk, John Ventimiglia, Ron Leibman, Wallace Shawn, David Warshofsky, Leo Fitzpatrick, Tim Guinee	
N O V E M B E R	27	Solaris	20th Century Fox / Lightstorm Entertainment	Steven Soderbergh (director/screenplay); George Clooney, Natascha McElhone, Viola Davis, Jeremy Davies, Ulrich Tukur, John Cho	
N O V E M B E R	27	They	Dimension Films	Robert Harmon (director); Brendan Hood (screenplay); Laura Regan, Marc Blucas, Ethan Embry, Dagmara Dominczyk, Jon Abrahams, Jay Brazeau, Jodelle Micah Ferland, Desiree Zurowski, Mark Hildreth, Jonathan Cherry, Peter LaCroix, L. Harvey Gold, David Abbott, Jessica Amlee, Alexander Gould	
N O V E M B E R	27	Treasure Planet	Walt Disney Pictures	Ron Clements, John Musker (directors/screenplay); Rob Edwards (screenplay); Joseph Gordon-Levitt, Brian Murray, David Hyde Pierce, Martin Short, Emma Thompson, Michael Wincott, Laurie Metcalf, Roscoe Lee Browne, Dane Davis, Michael McShane, Patrick McGoohan, Tony Jay, Corey Burton, Jack Angel, Bob Bergen, Rodger Bumpass, Jane Carr, John Cygan, Jennifer Darling, Paul Eiding, Sherry Lynn, Mona Marshall, Patrick Pinney, Phil Proctor, Jeremy Suarez, Jim Ward, Dee Bradley Baker, Peter Cullen, Kath Soucie	
D E C E M B E R	6	Adaptation	Columbia Pictures / Intermedia Films	Spike Jonze (director); Charlie Kaufman (screenplay); Nicolas Cage, Meryl Streep, Chris Cooper, Cara Seymour, Brian Cox, Tilda Swinton, Ron Livingston, Maggie Gyllenhaal, Judy Greer, Bob Yerkes, Jim Beaver, Litefoot, Jay Tavare, Doug Jones, Peter Jason, Gary Farmer, John Cusack, Catherine Keener, John Malkovich, Lance Acord, Spike Jonze, Curtis Hanson, David O. Russell	
D E C E M B E R	6	Analyze That	Warner Bros. Pictures / Village Roadshow Pictures	Harold Ramis (director/screenplay); Kenneth Lonergan, Peter Tolan, Peter Steinfeld (screenplay); Robert De Niro, Billy Crystal, Lisa Kudrow, Joe Viterelli, Cathy Moriarty, Joey 'Coco' Diaz, Thomas Rosales Jr., Kyle Sabihy, Rebecca Schull, James Biberi, Callie Thorne, Firdous Bamji, John Finn, David Fonteno, DonnaMarie Recco, Sylvia Kauders, Pat Cooper, Raymond Franza, Steven Kampmann, Tom Papa, Paul Herman, Charles A. Gargano, Reg Rogers, Frank Gio, Demetri Martin, Joe Torre, Dr. Joyce Brothers, Anthony LaPaglia, Gina Lynn	
D E C E M B E R	6	Empire	Universal Pictures	Franc. Reyes (director/screenplay); John Leguizamo, Peter Sarsgaard, Denise Richards, Delilah Cotto, Sonia Braga, Isabella Rossellini, Vincent Laresca, Nestor Serrano, Treach, Rafael Baez, Fat Joe	
D E C E M B E R	6	Equilibrium	Dimension Films	Kurt Wimmer (director/screenplay); Christian Bale, Emily Watson, Taye Diggs, Angus Macfadyen, Sean Bean, Matthew Harbour, William Fichtner, Sean Pertwee, David Hemmings, Emily Siewert, Alexa Summer, Maria Pia Calzone, Dominic Purcell, Brian Conley, Kurt Wimmer	
D E C E M B E R	7	Live from Baghdad	HBO Films	Mick Jackson (director); Robert Wiener, Richard Chapman, John Patrick Shanley, Timothy J. Sexton (screenplay); Michael Keaton, Helena Bonham Carter, Joshua Leonard, Lili Taylor, David Suchet, Bruce McGill, Michael Murphy, Paul Guilfoyle, Hamish Linklater, Michael Cudlitz, Robert Ray Wisdom, Clark Gregg, Matt Keeslar, Kurt Fuller, John Carroll Lynch, Tom Amandes, David Kaye, Bill Moseley, David Shatraw, Murphy Dunne, Peter Jason, Craig Anton, Jason Antoon, Carole Davis, Shaun Toub, Brian George, Joel Swetow, Ofer Samra, Castulo Guerra, Kevin Bacon, James Baker III, Tom Brokaw, George H. W. Bush, Dick Cheney, Tom Foley, Saddam Hussein, Peter Jennings, Ted Koppel, Dan Rather, Bernard Shaw, Fred Ward	
D E C E M B E R	13	About Schmidt	New Line Cinema	Alexander Payne (director/screenplay); Jim Taylor (screenplay); Jack Nicholson, Kathy Bates, Hope Davis, Dermot Mulroney, June Squibb, Howard Hesseman, Harry Groener, Connie Ray, Len Cariou, Phil Reeves, Matt Winston, James Michael Connor, Angela Lansbury	
D E C E M B E R	13	Drumline	20th Century Fox / Fox 2000 Pictures	Charles Stone III (director); Tina Gordon Chism, Shawn Schepps (screenplay); Nick Cannon, Zoe Saldaña, Orlando Jones, Leonard Roberts, Jason Weaver, J. Anthony Brown, Afemo Omilami, GQ, Shay Roundtree, O'Mar J. Dorsey, Chris Tucker, Petey Pablo, Stuart Scott, Blu Cantrell, Earl Poitier, Candace Carey, Angela Gibbs	
D E C E M B E R	13	The Hot Chick	Touchstone Pictures	Tom Brady (director/screenplay); Rob Schneider (screenplay); Rob Schneider, Anna Faris, Matthew Lawrence, Eric Christian Olsen, Robert Davi, Michael O'Keefe, Rachel McAdams, Sam Doumit, Melora Hardin, Alexandra Holden, Maritza Murray, Megan Kuhlmann, Matt Weinberg, Leila Kenzle, Jodi Long, Tia Mowry, Tamera Mowry, Maria-Elena Laas, Angie Stone, Lee Garlington, Dick Gregory, Ashlee Simpson, Michelle Branch, Scott Dolezal, Adam Sandler, Ozman Sirgood, Shazia Ali, Vivian Corado, Wes Takahashi	
D E C E M B E R	13	Maid in Manhattan	Columbia Pictures / Revolution Studios / Red OM Films	Wayne Wang (director); Kevin Wade (screenplay); Jennifer Lopez, Ralph Fiennes, Natasha Richardson, Stanley Tucci, Tyler Posey, Frances Conroy, Chris Eigeman, Amy Sedaris, Priscilla Lopez, Bob Hoskins, Maddie Corman, Sharon Wilkins, Jeffrey Dinowitz, Marissa Matrone, Lisa Roberts Gillan, D Quion, Marilyn Torres, Lou Ferguson	
D E C E M B E R	13	Star Trek: Nemesis	Paramount Pictures	Stuart Baird (director); John Logan (screenplay); Patrick Stewart, Jonathan Frakes, Brent Spiner, LeVar Burton, Michael Dorn, Gates McFadden, Marina Sirtis, Tom Hardy, Ron Perlman, Dina Meyer, John Berg, Kate Mulgrew, Shannon Cochran, Jude Ciccolella, Alan Dale, Wil Wheaton, Majel Barrett, Stuart Baird, Bryan Singer, Whoopi Goldberg	
D E C E M B E R	18	The Lord of the Rings: The Two Towers	New Line Cinema	Peter Jackson (director/screenplay); Fran Walsh, Philippa Boyens, Stephen Sinclair (screenplay); Elijah Wood, Ian McKellen, Liv Tyler, Viggo Mortensen, Sean Astin, Cate Blanchett, John Rhys-Davies, Bernard Hill, Christopher Lee, Billy Boyd, Dominic Monaghan, Orlando Bloom, Hugo Weaving, Miranda Otto, David Wenham, Brad Dourif, Karl Urban, Andy Serkis, Craig Parker, John Leigh, Bruce Hopkins, John Bach, Nathaniel Lees, Bruce Allpress, Sala Baker, Jed Brophy, Robbie Magasiva, Robyn Malcolm, Robert Pollock, Olivia Tennet, Ben Barrington, Alistair Browning, Daniel Falconer, Ben Fransham, Dan Hennah, Peter Jackson, Sandro Kopp, Anne McCaffrey, Henry Mortensen, Barrie M. Osborne, Shane Rangi, Matthew J. Saville, Hannah Wood, Sam Comery, Calum Gittins, Paris Howe Strewe, Ray Trickett, Stephen Ure, Alan Lee	
D E C E M B E R	19	25th Hour	Touchstone Pictures / 40 Acres and a Mule Filmworks	Spike Lee (director); David Benioff (screenplay); Edward Norton, Philip Seymour Hoffman, Barry Pepper, Rosario Dawson, Anna Paquin, Brian Cox, Tony Siragusa, Levan Uchaneishvili, Isiah Whitlock Jr., Michael Genet, Patrice O'Neal, Aaron Stanford, Marc H. Simon, Armando Riesco, Keith Nobbs, Dania Ramirez, Cynthia Darlow, Michole Briana White, Vanessa Ferlito, Coati Mundi, Larissa Drekonja, DJ Cipha Sounds, Tony Devon, Misha Kuznetsov, Al Palagonia	
D E C E M B E R	19	Antwone Fisher	Fox Searchlight Pictures	Denzel Washington (director); Antwone Fisher (screenplay); Derek Luke, Denzel Washington, Joy Bryant, Salli Richardson, Leonard Earl Howze, Kevin Connolly, Novella Nelson, Vernee Watson-Johnson, Viola Davis, Sung Kang, Ellis Williams, Yolonda Ross, De'Angelo Wilson, Chiwetel Ejiofor, Gary Russell, Jenifer Lewis, Malcolm David Kelley, Jascha Washington, Kente Scott, Rainoldo Gooding, Stephen Snedden, Cordell Stokes, Timothy Reddick, Andre Patton, Doug Jewell, Cory Hodges	
D E C E M B E R	20	Gangs of New York	Miramax Films	Martin Scorsese (director); Jay Cocks, Steven Zaillian, Kenneth Lonergan (screenplay); Leonardo DiCaprio, Daniel Day-Lewis, Cameron Diaz, John C. Reilly, Henry Thomas, Jim Broadbent, Liam Neeson, Brendan Gleeson, Gary Lewis, Stephen Graham, Eddie Marsan, Alec McCowen, David Hemmings, Lawrence Gilliard Jr., Cara Seymour, Roger Ashton-Griffiths, Barbara Bouchet, Michael Byrne, John Sessions, Richard Graham, Giovanni Lombardo Radice	
D E C E M B E R	20	Narc	Paramount Pictures / Lions Gate Films	Joe Carnahan (director/screenplay); Jason Patric, Ray Liotta, Busta Rhymes, Chi McBride, Stacey Farber, Alan van Sprang, John Ortiz	
D E C E M B E R	20	Two Weeks Notice	Warner Bros. Pictures / Castle Rock Entertainment / Village Roadshow Pictures	Marc Lawrence (director/screenplay); Sandra Bullock, Hugh Grant, Alicia Witt, Dana Ivey, Robert Klein, Heather Burns, David Haig, Dorian Missick, Joseph Badalucco Jr., Jonathan Dokuchitz, Veanne Cox, Katheryn Winnick, Jason Antoon, Francie Swift, David Aaron Baker, Tim Kang, Sharon Wilkins, Mike Piazza, Becky Ann Baker, Adam LeFevre, Donald Trump, Norah Jones, Radio Man, Robin Weigert	
D E C E M B E R	20	The Wild Thornberrys Movie	Paramount Pictures / Nickelodeon Movies / Klasky Csupo	Cathy Malkasian, Jeff McGrath (directors); Kate Boutilier (screenplay); Lacey Chabert, Danielle Harris, Tim Curry, Jodi Carlisle, Michael "Flea" Balzary, Tom Kane, Lynn Redgrave, Cree Summer, Rupert Everett, Marisa Tomei, Brock Peters, Alfre Woodard, Kimberly Brooks, Brenda Blethyn, Obba Babatundé, Kevin Michael Richardson, Melissa Greenspan, Crystal Scales, Alexandra Boyd, Moira Quirk, Tara Strong, Hynden Walch, Mae Whitman, Roger L. Jackson, John Kassir, Charles Shaughnessy, Jeff Coopwood, Billy Brown, Keith Szarabajka, Earl Boen, Michael Chinyamurindi, Anthony Okungbowa	
D E C E M B E R	25	Catch Me If You Can	DreamWorks / Amblin Entertainment	Steven Spielberg (director); Jeff Nathanson (screenplay); Leonardo DiCaprio, Tom Hanks, Christopher Walken, Martin Sheen, Nathalie Baye, Amy Adams, James Brolin, Nancy Lenehan, Candice Azzara, Malachi Throne, Alfred Dennis, Amy Acker, Guy Thauvette, Thomas Kopache, James Morrison, Robert Symonds, Brian Howe, Frank John Hughes, Chris Ellis, John Finn, Jennifer Garner, Ellen Pompeo, Elizabeth Banks, Kaitlin Doubleday, Steve Eastin, Margaret Travolta, Jimmie F. Skaggs, Alex Hyde-White, Lilyan Chauvin, Robert Curtis Brown, Steve Witting, Sarah Lancaster, Kyle Davis, Patrick Thomas O'Brien, Jaime Ray Newman, Stephen Dunham, Brandon Keener, Kam Heskin, Gerald Molen, Jessica Collins, Joe Garagiola, Kitty Carlisle Hart, Nick Zano, Frank Abagnale	
D E C E M B E R	25	The Hours	Paramount Pictures / Miramax Films	Stephen Daldry (director); David Hare (screenplay); Meryl Streep, Julianne Moore, Nicole Kidman, Ed Harris, Toni Collette, Claire Danes, Jeff Daniels, Stephen Dillane, Allison Janney, John C. Reilly, Miranda Richardson, Lyndsey Marshal, Linda Bassett, Jack Rovello, Margo Martindale, Eileen Atkins	
D E C E M B E R	25	The Pianist	Focus Features / StudioCanal	Roman Polanski (director); Ronald Harwood (screenplay); Adrien Brody, Thomas Kretschmann, Frank Finlay, Maureen Lipman, Emilia Fox, Ed Stoppard, Julia Rayner, Jessica Kate Meyer, Ronan Vibert, Ruth Platt, Andrew Tiernan, Michal Zebrowski, Roy Smiles, Richard Ridings, Daniel Caltagirone, Valentine Pelka, Zbigniew Zamachowski, Krzysztof Pieczyński, Andrzej Blumenfeld, Paul Bradley, John Bennett, Cyril Shaps, Cezary Kosiński, Zofia Czerwińska, Joanna Brodzik, Lech Mackiewicz, Katarzyna Figura, Marian Dziędziel, Nina Franoszek	
D E C E M B E R	27	Chicago	Miramax Films / The Producer Circle Co.	Rob Marshall (director); Bill Condon (screenplay); Renée Zellweger, Catherine Zeta-Jones, Richard Gere, Queen Latifah, John C. Reilly, Christine Baranski, Taye Diggs, Colm Feore, Lucy Liu, Dominic West, Mýa, Jayne Eastwood, Chita Rivera, Susan Misner, Denise Faye, Deidre Goodwin, Ekaterina Chtchelkanova	
D E C E M B E R	27	Nicholas Nickleby	United Artists	Douglas McGrath (director/screenplay); Charlie Hunnam, Nathan Lane, Jim Broadbent, Christopher Plummer, Jamie Bell, Anne Hathaway, Alan Cumming, Timothy Spall, Tom Courtenay, Juliet Stevenson, Romola Garai, Stella Gonet, Heather Goldenhersh, Barry Humphries, Gerard Horan, William Ash, Edward Fox, David Bradley, Phil Davis, Kevin McKidd, Nicholas Rowe, Sophie Thompson, Andrew Havill, Angus Wright	
D E C E M B E R	27	Sonny	Samuel Goldwyn Films	Nicolas Cage (director); John Carlen (screenplay); James Franco, Brenda Blethyn, Harry Dean Stanton, Mena Suvari, Seymour Cassel, Josie Davis, Nicolas Cage, Brenda Vaccaro, Marc Coppola	
D E C E M B E R	30	Love Liza	Sony Pictures Classics / Wild Bunch / StudioCanal / Starhaus Filmproduktion	Todd Louiso (director); Gordy Hoffman (screenplay); Philip Seymour Hoffman, Jack Kehler, Stephen Tobolowsky, Kathy Bates, J.D. Walsh, Erika Alexander, Jim Wise, Wayne Duvall, Cullen Douglas, Chris Ellis, Julia Lashae, Don Hood, John McConnell, Kelli Garner, Sarah Koskoff, Jimmy Raskin, Trace Turville, Kevin Breznahan, Jennifer Keddy, Pauline Boyd, Ernest Perry Jr., Dan Klass, Annie Morgan	
D E C E M B E R	31	Confessions of a Dangerous Mind	Miramax Films	George Clooney (director); Charlie Kaufman (screenplay); Sam Rockwell, George Clooney, Julia Roberts, Drew Barrymore, Rutger Hauer, Jerry Weintraub, Robert John Burke, Michael Ensign, Maggie Gyllenhaal, Rachelle Lefevre, Kristen Wilson, Daniel Zacapa, Emilio Rivera, Carlos Carrasco, Richard Kind, Brad Pitt, Matt Damon, Michael Cera, Chuck Barris, Dick Clark, Jim Lange, Murray Langston, Jaye P. Morgan, Gene Patton	

== See also ==
- List of 2002 box office number-one films in the United States
- 2002 in the United States
