= Jessica Kate Meyer =

American rabbi and retired actress

- Occupations: Actress; Rabbi
- Years active: 2001–2008

Jessica Kate Meyer is an American retired actress, who has appeared in The Pianist, and was later ordained as a rabbi.

== Early years ==
Meyer and her family moved from Waban, Massachusetts to Connecticut when she was 4 or 5 years old. She commuted to take violin lessons at the New England Conservatory of Music and played with the Youth Philharmonic Orchestra,

Her early experiences at the synagogue her family attended in West Hartford began the steps that eventually led to her becoming a rabbi. Her violin lessons had acquainted her with classical music, which enhanced her awareness of the cantor's singing. He "became a rock star to me", she said. The cantor's wife tutored her in Hebrew, a language that she studied further when she attended Wellesley College in the 1990s. Her degree in Middle Eastern studies included spending her junior year in Israel.

After competing her studies at Wellesley, worked with peace groups and Israeli-Palestinian theater in Israel. She went on to continue her education at the Royal Central School of Speech and Drama in London.

== Acting career ==
While Meyer was in school in London her sister told her about the making of The Pianist and suggested that Meyer should be in it. After reading the book on which the film was based, she submitted a photograph of herself to the producer after talking to him by telephone. Two auditions led to her being cast as the sister in the film.

Meyer's other acting credits included the HBO film Mrs. Harris (2005) and a Spanish arthouse film.

== Rabbinate ==
Making The Pianist provided more background for Meyer's becoming a rabbi. She said that working on the film was "more of a Jewish experience than a film experience". Her preparation included reading memoirs and doing other research. She related to the music in a way similar to the way she had felt about the cantor's music when she was a child.

She worked in Los Angeles with Ikar, a synagogue that featured programs to help disaffected Jews, and she spent a year on a fellowship studying Jewish text and leadership. During that time she declined auditions for acting jobs, preferring to focus on "the things I was raised to value". While studying with a rabbi, she decided to study more music and enrolled in Hebrew College's (HC) cantorial program. During her time there she switched to the rabbinic program.

Meyer was an intern at the Romemu synagogue in Manhattan. She was ordained as a rabbi at HC in June 2014, and the next day she became co-music director and assistant rabbi at Romemu. She has been rabbi-hazzan of The Kitchen in San Francisco and rabbi of Chizuk Amuno Congregation in Baltimore, Maryland.

== Films ==
- The Pianist as Halina Szpilman (2002)
- Al sur de Granada as Dora Carrington (2003)
- Rise of the Damned as Kellie (2011)

== Television ==
- Scrubs (2004)
- Mrs. Harris (2005)
