= Julia Rayner =

British actress

Julia Rayner is a British actress, who has appeared in The Pianist (2002), Topsy-Turvy (1999) and The Gift (1998).

== Films ==
- The Gift (1998)
- Topsy-Turvy (1999)
- The Pianist as Regina Szpilman
