= The Pianist (2002 film) =

Biopic directed by Roman Polanski

- US Theatrical release poster
- Directed by: Roman Polanski
- Screenplay by: Ronald Harwood
- Based on: The Pianist by Władysław Szpilman
- Produced by: Roman Polanski; Robert Benmussa; Alain Sarde; Gene Gutowski
- Starring: Adrien Brody; Thomas Kretschmann; Frank Finlay; Maureen Lipman; Emilia Fox; Ed Stoppard; Julia Rayner; Jessica Kate Meyer
- Cinematography: Paweł Edelman
- Edited by: Hervé de Luze
- Music by: Wojciech Kilar
- Production companies: Canal+; Studio Babelsberg; StudioCanal
- Distributed by: BAC Films (France); Tobis StudioCanal (Germany); Syrena Entertainment Group (Poland); Pathé Distribution (United Kingdom); Focus Features (United States, Australian, New Zealand and South African)
- Release dates: 24 May 2002 (Cannes); 6 September 2002 (Poland); 25 September 2002 (France); 24 October 2002 (Germany); 4 December 2002 (United States); 24 January 2003 (United Kingdom)
- Running time: 149 minutes
- Countries: France; Germany; Poland; United Kingdom
- Languages: English; German
- Budget: $35 million
- Box office: $120.1 million

The Pianist is a 2002 epic biographical historical drama film co-produced and directed by Roman Polanski, with a script by Ronald Harwood, and starring Adrien Brody. It is based on the autobiographical book The Pianist (1946), a memoir by the Polish-Jewish pianist, composer and Holocaust survivor Władysław Szpilman. The film was a co-production by France, the United Kingdom, Germany and Poland.

The Pianist premiered at the 2002 Cannes Film Festival on 24 May 2002, where it won the Palme d'Or, and went into wide release that September; the film received widespread critical acclaim, with critics lauding Polanski's direction, Brody's performance and Harwood's screenplay.

At the 75th Academy Awards, the film won for Best Director (Polanski), Best Adapted Screenplay (Harwood), and Best Actor (Brody), and was nominated for four others, including Best Picture. It also won the BAFTA Award for Best Film and BAFTA Award for Best Direction in 2003, and seven French Césars, including Best Picture, Best Director, and Best Actor for Brody. Since its release, the film has been widely acclaimed as one of the greatest films of the 21st century. In 2016, it appeared in BBC's 100 Greatest Films of the 21st Century.

== Plot ==
In September 1939, Polish-Jewish pianist Władysław Szpilman plays live on the radio in Warsaw when the station is bombed during a Nazi German air raid against Warsaw. Szpilman and his family prepare to leave the city when they learn that Britain and France have declared war on Germany. Relieved at the news, Szpilman stays in Warsaw with his family. However, Poland is invaded and Warsaw falls under Nazi occupation. Jews are persecuted by the new government, heavily restricted from public life and forced to wear blue Star of David armbands. Szpilman and his family sell their belongings, including his grand piano, in order to survive.

The Szpilmans are forced to abandon their home in late 1940 and move into the overcrowded Warsaw Ghetto. Conditions are deplorable, disease and starvation are rampant. Jews are under constant threat of brutality by the SS. Szpilman gets a job performing in a café frequented by upper-class Jews, who smuggle in forbidden goods to live comfortably. Szpilman witnesses a young boy savagely beaten by a guard and left for dead while attempting to escape the ghetto. The boy dies despite Szpilman's attempt to save him. Szpilman and his family also witness an SS raid on an apartment block opposite them, during which a man who uses a wheelchair is thrown off the balcony to his death. To the horror of the Szpilmans, the rest of the men are shot.

Despite securing German work certificates, the Szpilmans are rounded up and herded, with hundreds of other Jews, onto trains. They were told they were going to labor camps, but the train is actually headed to the Treblinka extermination camp in August 1942 as part of Operation Reinhard. A member of the Jewish Ghetto Police, who Szpilman knows, separates Szpilman from his family at the railhead, allowing him to escape while his family is taken to the death camp. Szpilman wanders through the liquidated ghetto, bodies of executed Jews litter the streets, including children and an infant. Szpilman becomes a slave labourer and learns of an upcoming Warsaw Ghetto Uprising. He smuggles weapons into the ghetto and goes into hiding with help from his friends Andrzej Bogucki and his wife Janina Godlewska, who are with the Polish resistance.

Szpilman watches the uprising unfold and fail in April 1943 from his hiding place. When a female neighbor attempts to report Szpilman, he travels to another hiding place in the German quarter, provided by the husband of his former romantic interest Dorota, who is pregnant. The new apartment is opposite a German Schutzpolizei station and has a piano, which Szpilman cannot play for fear of drawing attention. Szpilman suffers from malnourishment and jaundice, as he is neglected and exploited by his handler. After learning of his condition, Dorota and her husband obtain a doctor to treat him before leaving Warsaw.

Szpilman recovers by August 1944 and witnesses the Warsaw Uprising unfold. The Home Army attacks the military hospital and police station across the street, taking positions in Szpilman's apartment block, but the resistance fighters are overrun. German troops destroy his apartment with a tank. Szpilman narrowly escapes from German soldiers and hides in the now abandoned hospital as Warsaw is destroyed in the fighting.

When German troops later set fire to the hospital with flamethrowers during the razing of the city, Szpilman flees through the city's ruins and is discovered by Wehrmacht officer Wilm Hosenfeld, who learns that he is a pianist. After Szpilman plays Frédéric Chopin's "Ballade No. 1 in G minor" on the house's grand piano, the officer allows him to continue to hide in the house, providing him food.

The Germans are forced to retreat from Warsaw because of a Soviet offensive in January 1945, Hosenfeld promises Szpilman he will listen to him on Polish Radio after the war and leaves him with a large supply of food and his greatcoat. After Warsaw is liberated, Szpilman is attacked by Polish soldiers who mistake him for a German because of his coat. The soldiers eventually spare him.

Hosenfeld is held after the war in a Soviet POW camp. When passing former concentration camp inmates hurl abuses at the prisoners, one laments the loss of his career as a violinist. Hosenfeld asks if he knows Szpilman and implores the violinist to bring Szpilman as a character reference, but when they return to the site, Hosenfeld and the camp are long gone.

Szpilman resumes his career, performing Chopin's "Grande polonaise" with an orchestra in a large concert hall to a full crowd.

Wladyslaw Szpilman continued to live in Warsaw until his death on 6th July, 2000. He was 88 years old. The name of the German officer was Captain Wilm Hosenfeld. All that is known is that he died in a Soviet prisoner-of-war camp in 1952.

— Closing captions

== Cast ==
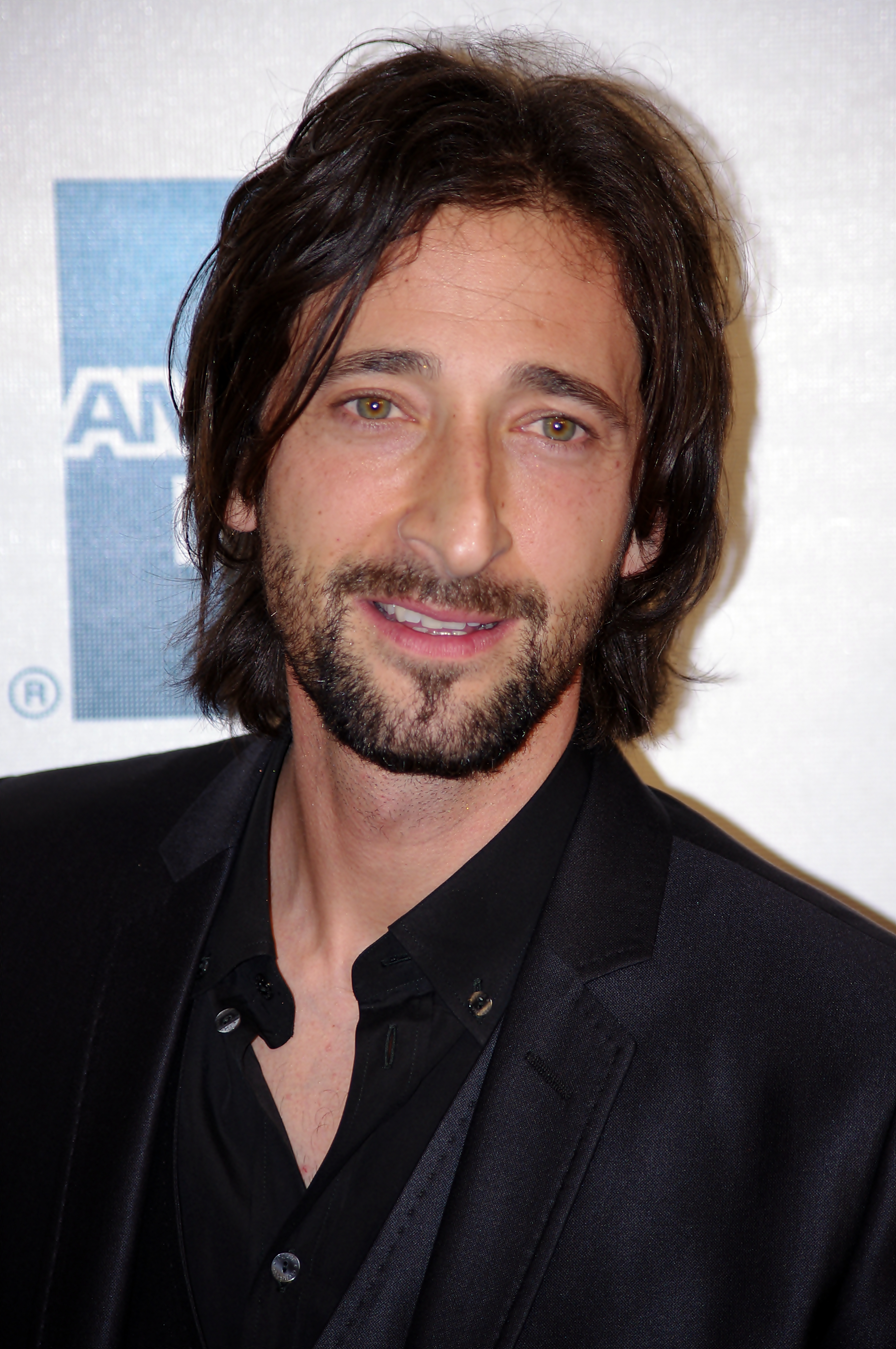
Adrien Brody in 2011

- Adrien Brody as Władysław Szpilman
- Thomas Kretschmann as Captain Wilm Hosenfeld
- Frank Finlay as Samuel Szpilman, Father
- Maureen Lipman as Edwarda Szpilman, Mother
- Emilia Fox as Dorota
- Ed Stoppard as Henryk Szpilman
- Julia Rayner as Regina Szpilman
- Jessica Kate Meyer as Halina Szpilman
- Michał Żebrowski as Jurek
- Richard Ridings as Mr. Lipa
- Roy Smiles as Itzhak Heller
- Daniel Caltagirone as Majorek
- Zbigniew Zamachowski as Customer with coins
- Ruth Platt as Janina Bogucki
- Ronan Vibert as Andrzej Bogucki
- Krzysztof Pieczyński as Marek Gębczyński
- Valentine Pelka as Michal Dzkiewicz, Dorota's Husband
- Andrew Tiernan as Antek Szałas

== Production ==
=== Development and casting ===
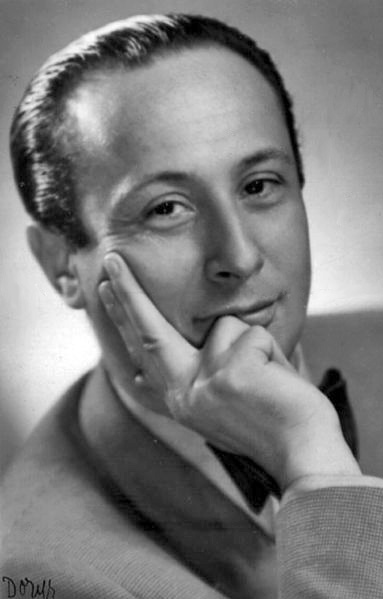
Władysław Szpilman

The story had deep connections with director Roman Polanski because he escaped from the Kraków Ghetto as a child after the death of his mother. He ended up living in a Polish farmer's barn until the war's end. His father almost died in the camps, but they reunited after the end of World War II.

Joseph Fiennes was Polanski's first choice for the lead role, but he turned it down due to a previous commitment to a theatrical role. Over 1,400 actors auditioned for the role of Szpilman at a casting call in London, but Polanski was unsatisfied with all who tried. Eventually, Polanski watched Harrison's Flowers (2000), and then Polanski decided to offer Adrien Brody the leading role during their first meeting in Paris.

=== Filming ===
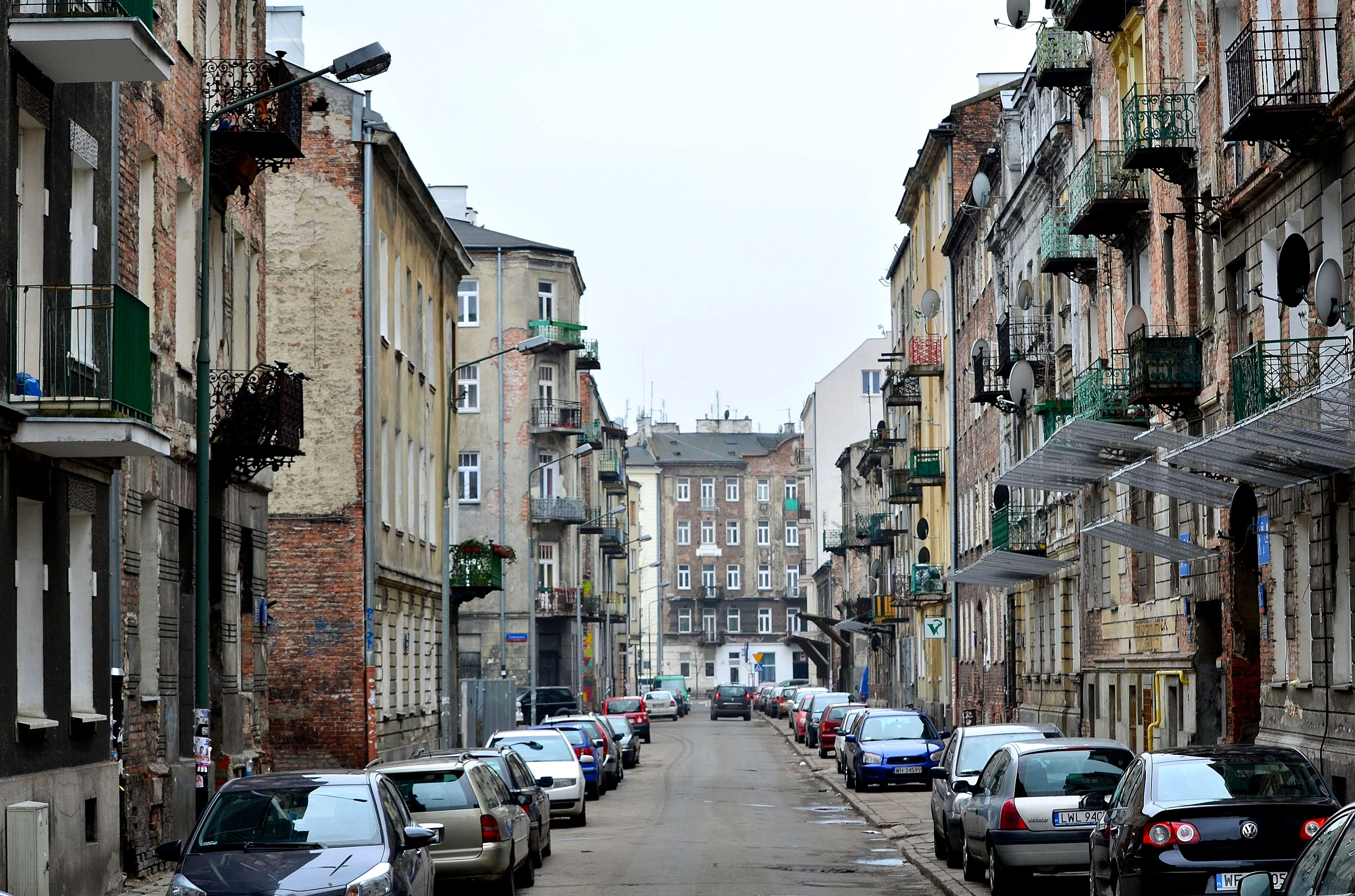
Mała Street in Warsaw's Praga-Północ district used for filming of The Pianist

Principal photography on The Pianist began on 9 February 2001 in Babelsberg Studio in Potsdam, Germany. The Warsaw Ghetto and the surrounding city were recreated on the backlot of Babelsberg Studio as they would have looked during the war. Old Soviet Army barracks were used to create the ruined city, as they were going to be destroyed anyway.

The first scenes of the film were shot at the old army barracks. Soon after, the film crew moved to a villa in Potsdam, which served as the house where Szpilman meets Hosenfeld. On 2 March 2001, filming then moved to an abandoned Soviet military hospital in Beelitz, Germany. The scenes that featured German soldiers destroying a Warsaw hospital with flamethrowers were filmed there. On 15 March, filming finally moved to Babelsberg Studios. The first scene shot at the studio was the complex and technically demanding scene in which Szpilman witnesses the ghetto uprising.

Filming at the studios ended on 26 March, and moved to Warsaw on 29 March. The rundown district of Praga was chosen for filming because of its abundance of original buildings. The art department built onto these original buildings, re-creating World War II-era Poland with signs and posters from the period. Additional filming also took place around Warsaw. The Umschlagplatz scene where Szpilman, his family, and hundreds of other Jews wait to be taken to the extermination camps was filmed at the National Defence University of Warsaw.

Principal photography ended in July 2001, and was followed by months of post-production in Paris.

=== Music ===
- The piano piece heard at the beginning of the film is Chopin's Nocturne in C-sharp minor, Lento con gran espressione, Op. posth.
- The piano piece that is heard being played by a next door neighbour while Szpilman was in hiding at an apartment is also an arrangement of "Umówiłem się z nią na dziewiątą".
- The piano music heard in the abandoned house when Szpilman had just discovered a hiding place in the attic is the Piano Sonata No. 14 (Moonlight Sonata) by Beethoven. It was later revealed that German officer Hosenfeld was the pianist. The German composition juxtaposed with the mainly Polish/Chopin selection of Szpilman.
- The piano piece played when Szpilman is confronted by Hosenfeld is Chopin's Ballade in G minor, Op. 23, but the version played in the movie was shortened (the entire piece lasts about 10 minutes).
- The cello piece heard at the middle of the film, played by Dorota, is the Prelude from Bach's Cello Suite No. 1.
- The piano piece heard at the end of the film, played with an orchestra, is Chopin's Grande Polonaise brillante, Op. 22.
- Shots of Szpilman's hands playing the piano in close-up were performed by Polish classical pianist Janusz Olejniczak, who also performed on the soundtrack.
- Since Polanski wanted the film to be as realistic as possible, any scene showing Brody playing was actually his playing, overdubbed by recordings performed by Olejniczak. In order for Brody's playing to look like it was at the level of Szpilman's, he spent many months prior to and during the filming practising so that his keystrokes on the piano would convince viewers that Brody himself was playing.

== Reception ==
=== Critical response ===
The Pianist was widely acclaimed by critics, with Brody's performance, Harwood's screenplay, and Polanski's direction receiving special praise. On the review aggregator website Rotten Tomatoes, 95% of 186 critics' reviews are positive, with an average rating of 8.5/10. The website's consensus reads: "Well-acted and dramatically moving, The Pianist is Polanski's best work in years." On Metacritic, the film has a weighted average score of 85 out of 100, based on 40 critics, indicating "universal acclaim".

Roger Ebert of the Chicago Sun-Times gave the film three and a half stars out of four, noting that, "perhaps that impassive quality reflects what [director Roman] Polanski wants to say. ... By showing Szpilman as a survivor, but not a fighter or a hero—as a man who does all he can to save himself, but would have died without enormous good luck and the kindness of a few non-Jews—Polanski is reflecting ... his own deepest feelings: that he survived, but need not have, and that his mother died and left a wound that had never healed."

Michael Wilmington of the Chicago Tribune said that the film "is the best dramatic feature I've seen on the Holocaust experience, so powerful a statement on war, inhumanity, and art's redemption that it may signal Polanski's artistic redemption". He later said that the film "illustrates that theme and proves that Polanski's own art has survived the chaos of his life—and the hell that war and bigotry once made of it".

Richard Schickel of Time magazine called it a "raw, unblinkable film", and said that "we admire this film for its harsh objectivity and refusal to seek our tears, our sympathies."

Mick LaSalle of the San Francisco Chronicle said that the film "contains moments of irony, of ambiguity, and of strange beauty, as when we finally get a look at Warsaw and see a panorama of destruction, a world of color bombed into black-and-white devastation". He also said that, "in the course of showing us a struggle for survival, in all its animal simplicity, Polanski also gives us humanity, in all its complexity."

A.O. Scott of The New York Times said that Szpilman "comes to resemble one of Samuel Beckett's gaunt existential clowns, shambling through a barren, bombed-out landscape clutching a jar of pickles. He is like the walking punchline to a cosmic jest of unfathomable cruelty." He also felt that Szpilman's encounter, in the war's last days, with a music-loving German officer, "courted sentimentality by associating the love of art with moral decency, an equation the Nazis themselves, steeped in Beethoven and Wagner, definitively refuted".

In 2025, it was one of the films voted for the "Readers' Choice" edition of The New York Times' list of "The 100 Best Movies of the 21st Century," finishing at number 140.

== Home media ==
The Pianist was released by Universal Studios Home Entertainment on DVD in the US on 27 May 2003 in a double-sided disc Special Edition, with the film on one side and the featurette "A Story of Survival" on the other. The making-of featurette included interviews with Brody, Polanski, and Harwood, and clips of Szpilman playing the piano. The Polish DVD included an audio commentary track by production designer Starski and director of photography Edelman.

Universal released the film on HD-DVD on 8 January 2008 with the featurette "A Story of Survival".

Optimum Home Entertainment released The Pianist to the European market on Blu-ray as part of their StudioCanal Collection on 13 September 2010, the film's second release on Blu-ray. The first release was troublesome due to issues with subtitles; the initial BD lacked subtitles for spoken German dialogue. Optimum later rectified this, but the initial release also lacked notable special features. The StudioCanal Collection version includes the featurette "A Story of Survival", as well as several interviews with the makers of the film and Szpilman's relatives.

Shout! Factory released the film on Blu-ray in the US for the first time on 13 July 2021.

The film was completely restored in 2023 from the original negative by StudioCanal and DI Factory, with the assistance of the film's cinematographer Paweł Edelman. It was released on 4K UHD by StudioCanal in Germany on 21 September 2023, in France on 27 September 2023 and in the United Kingdom on 2 October 2023.

== See also ==
- Robinson Crusoes of Warsaw – Szpilman was one of the most notable persons to remain in Warsaw after its destruction by Nazi Germany and before its liberation by the Red Army in January 1945.
- List of Holocaust films

Awards
Preceded by Amélie	Goya Award for Best European Film; 2002	Succeeded by Good Bye, Lenin!
