= Andrzej Szpilman =

Polish composer (born 1956)

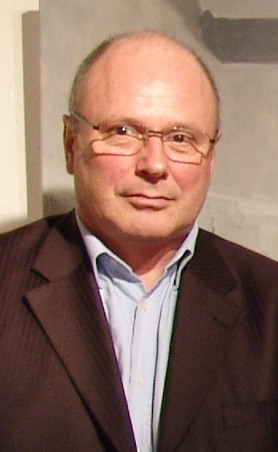
Szpilman in 2010

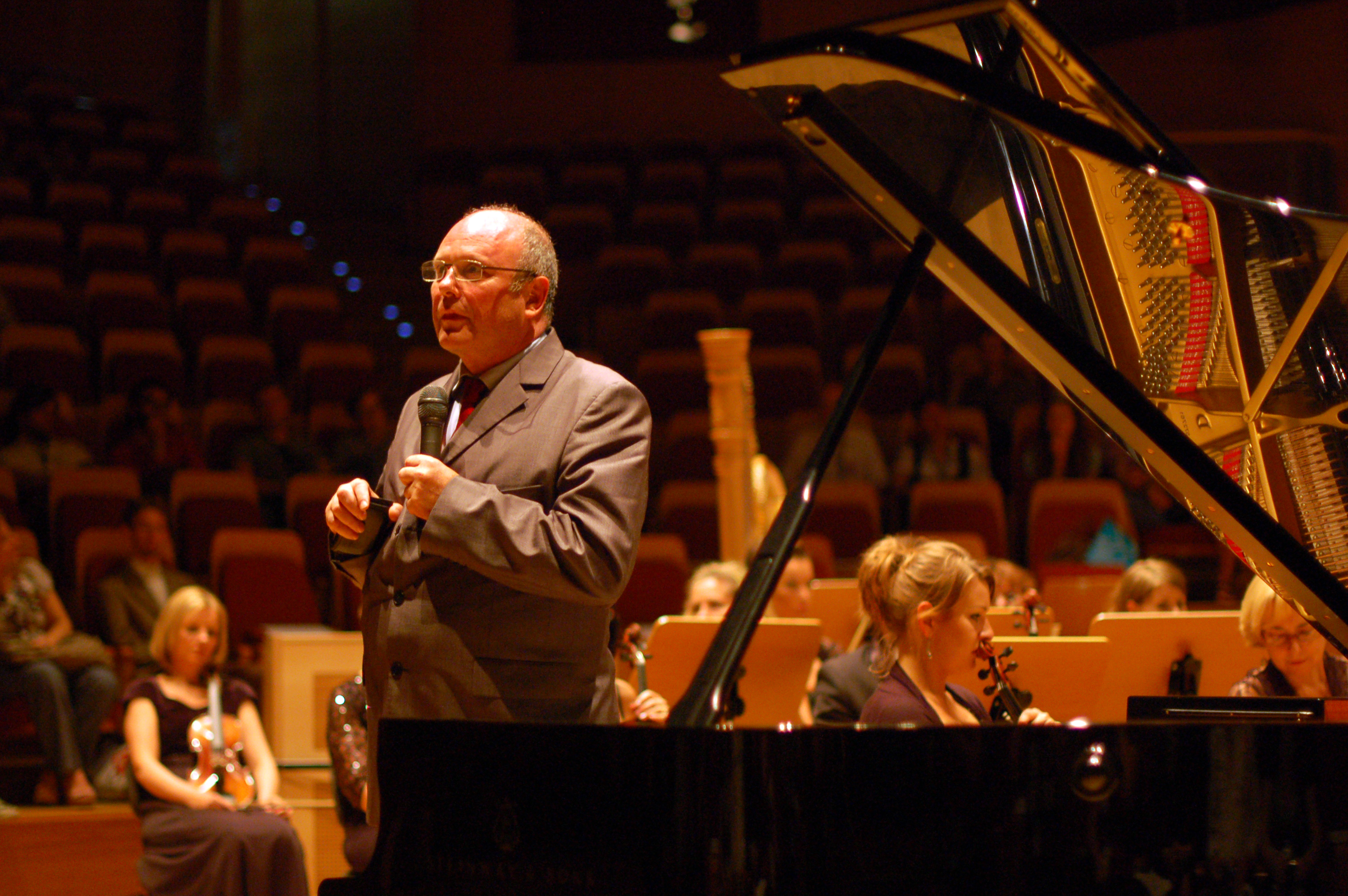
Andrzej Szpilman at a concert in honor of the 10th anniversary of his father's death at Wikimania 2010 in Gdańsk

Andrzej Szpilman (born March 28, 1956) is a Polish dentist, composer, music producer, publisher, and son of the pianist and composer Władysław Szpilman.

== Biography ==
Szpilman started his music education in 1962 under Prof. S. Kawalla (violin) and later from 1965 until 1974 in the 4th State School of Music in Warsaw (class of Prof. Nasalska violin and later viola).

In 1976, he started to record for Polish Radio as a composer and music producer.

He has worked with Polish singers Irena Santor, Hanna Banaszak, Grażyna Świtała, Bogusław Mec, accompanied by the Warsaw Radio Orchestra and Poznań Radio Orchestra. In 1980-81, as a music director, Szpilman produced several shows for TV-Poland. From 1982-83 he became the producer of the first record by the 1980s Polish group, "Oddział Zamknięty" (Close Department), which sold about 450.000 records in 1983 and received "Gold Record 83" from the Polish Recording Company.

Besides his artistic activities he studied Dentistry at the Warsaw Medical Academy. In 1983 he moved to Hamburg, Germany, and until 1988 he worked as an assistant professor at the Conservative Dentistry Department of the University of Hamburg, while continuing to work at his own dental practice in Hamburg/Altona and later in Weil am Rhein.

In 1987, Szpilman founded his own "Musik Studio Altona", where he continued to work on his film ballet and theater music. At that time he composed the ballet "Incense" (choreographed by Gamal Gouda) for the Hamburg Opera, as well as soundtracks including "I tam zostane juz na zawsze" and "Kolejka" - for TV-Poland, and some small pieces for theater and songs for Polish Radio.

During the period from 1996–2004, he engineered CDs for the German songwriter and poet Wolf Biermann. He also remastered the complete recording anthology of Wolf Biermann from 1968–1997, a total of 21 records.

In 1997, Szpilman prepared the publication of the memoir The Pianist, written in 1945 by his father Władysław for the German publisher ECON (1998) and later for British publisher Orion (1999). The Pianist became an international bestseller. It was named Book of the Year by the LA Times, Washington Post, Independent and Lire, and was translated into more than 35 languages.

In November 2000, he produced the Radio and TV concert: "Tribute to Wladyslaw Szpilman" in Warsaw. In 2001–02, he returned to producing and moderating with a concert show at the Polish Radio entitled: “Microphon for everybody”.

Szpilman also assisted in the production of Roman Polański's 2002 film The Pianist and later cooperated on the PR-work with the US, German, Swiss, Italian and Polish movie distributors.

In 2002, he became an independent executive producer for Universal Music, Sony Classical and Sherman Records Ca. and prepared the CDs with Wladyslaw Szpilman’s music: "Wendy Lands sings the songs of the Pianist" (2002) (Universal Music), and also a CD "Original recordings of the Pianist" (2002), "Works for Piano and Orchestra by Władysław Szpilman" with Ewa Kupiec-Piano, John Axelrod-Director and Berliner Radio Symphony Orchestra (2004), as well as Władysław Szpilman – "Legendary recordings" (2005) (Sony Classical).

Szpilman also worked with "Boosey & Hawkes" music publishers on the publication of the complete works of his father, Wladyslaw Szpilman. He is working on the TV documentary on his father's life and producing a CD with songs by Wladyslaw Szpilman with Polish singer and actor Alicja Bachleda.

== See also ==
- The Pianist (memoir)
