= Wilm Hosenfeld =

German army officer (1895–1952) and Righteous among the Nations

Wilhelm Hosenfeld
- Hosenfeld in 1939
- Born: Wilhelm Adalbert Hosenfeld; 2 May 1895; Hünfeld, Hesse-Nassau, Prussia, German Empire
- Died: 13 August 1952 (aged 57); Volgograd, Volgograd Oblast, Russia
- Military career
- Allegiance: German Empire; Nazi Germany
- Branch: Imperial German Army; German Army
- Service years: 1914–1917; 1939–1945
- Rank: Hauptmann
- Units: Guard Battalion 660
- Commands: Lager Pabianitz
- Conflicts: World War I; Eastern Front (WIA); World War II; Eastern Front (POW)
- Awards: Order of Polonia Restituta (posthumous); Righteous Among the Nations; Iron Cross

Wilhelm Adalbert Hosenfeld (German pronunciation: [ˈvɪl(hɛl)m ˈhoːzənfɛlt]; 2 May 1895 – 13 August 1952) was a German Catholic school teacher, and propaganda and intelligence officer in the German Army during World War II. He served as the commander of prisoner-of-war camps in the General Government and from 1940 as an intelligence and counterintelligence officer in the garrison of occupied Warsaw. During the Warsaw Uprising, he interrogated captive Polish civilians, Polish resistance members and Red Army soldiers before their execution.

He is credited with rescuing or assisting at least three Polish Jews, including the pianist and classical composer Władysław Szpilman during the German destruction of Warsaw, and with having helped a number of Polish people under Nazi occupation. Hosenfeld's assistance to Szpilman was portrayed in the 2002 film The Pianist. His efforts were recognised by the posthumous award of the Commander's Cross of the Order of Polonia Restituta from the President of Poland Lech Kaczyński in 2007, and of the Righteous Among the Nations title from Yad Vashem in 2009.

== Biography ==
=== Early life and pre-WW2 activities ===
Hosenfeld was born into the family of a Roman Catholic schoolmaster living near Fulda in Hesse. He was influenced by the Catholic Action and Church-inspired social work. He fought as an infantry soldier with the Imperial German Army during World War I in Flanders, the Baltics and Romania from 1914 to 1917. Severely wounded in 1917, he received the Iron Cross Second Class. He viewed the Treaty of Versailles as a national humiliation. After returning from the front he married Annemarie Krummacher, who is said to have exerted a pacifist influence on him. He worked as a teacher in Catholic schools during the interwar period; as a "moderniser" he rejected the caning of students.

During the 1920s, he became active in the Wandervogel section of the German Youth Movement and participated in organised sport, both of which led him to enlist in the Sturmabteilung (SA), the original paramilitary wing of the Nazi Party. He joined the NSDAP in 1935, and participated in the 1936 and 1938 Nuremberg rallies. His writings from the time opposed the National Socialist political project to the "barbaric" legacy of the French Revolution and the October Revolution. In 1938, he expressed disquiet over the Nazi attacks on religion. In 1939, he was employed as the head teacher in Thalau.

=== World War II ===
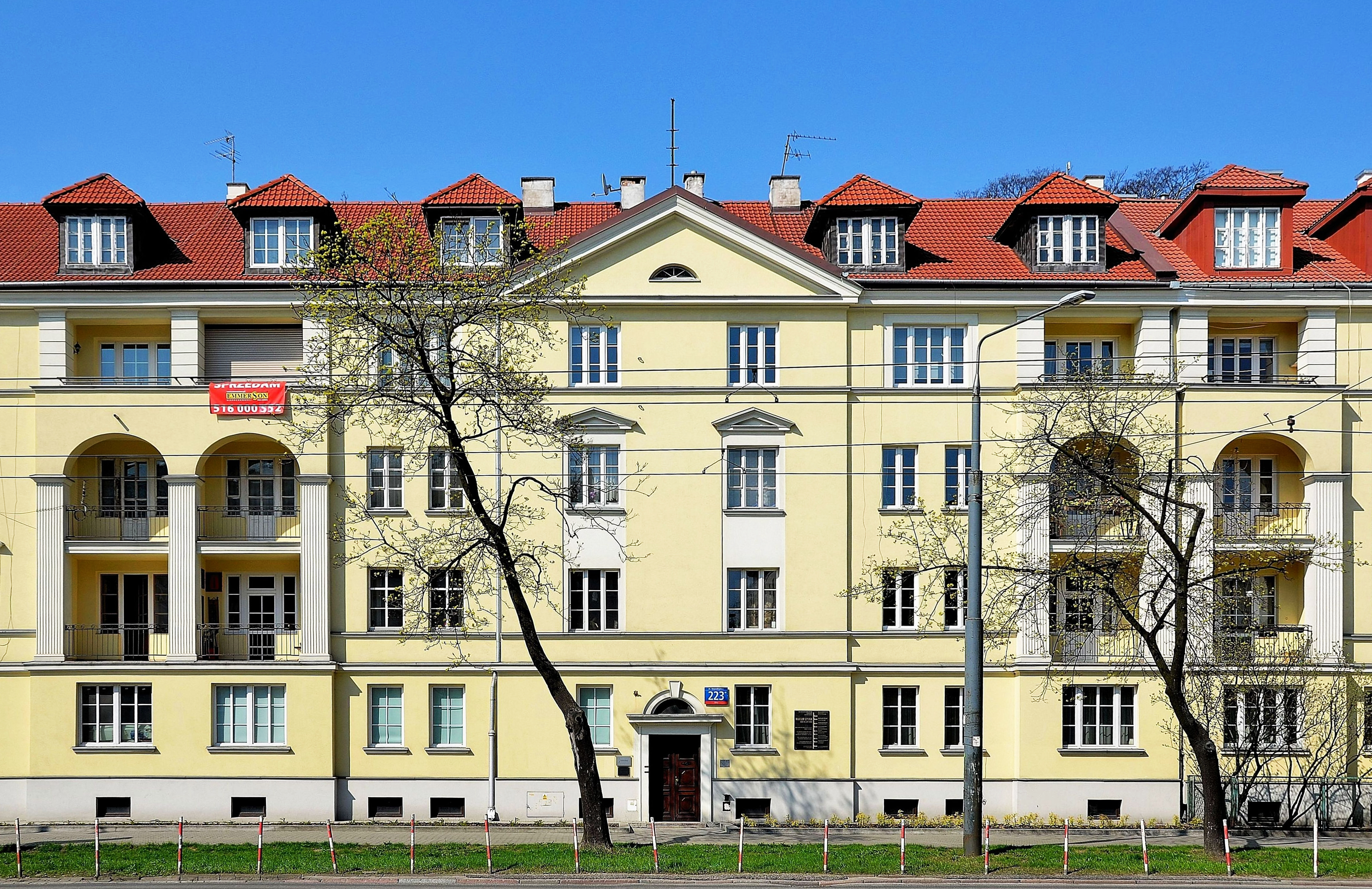
The house at 223 Niepodległości Avenue in Warsaw, where Hosenfeld helped Władysław Szpilman

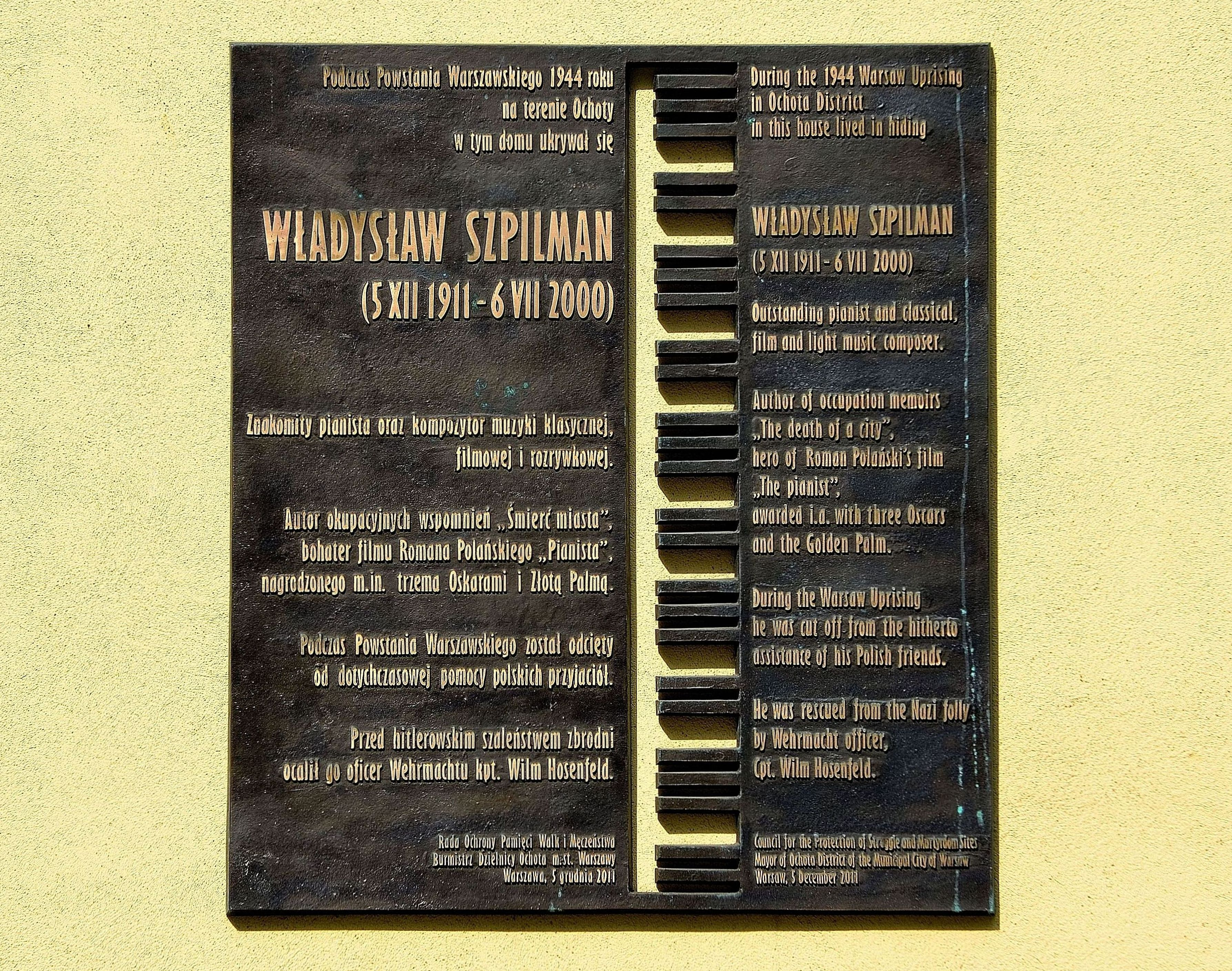
Commemorative plaque on the building

Hosenfeld was deployed to Poland for the entirety of his involvement in World War II. He was mobilised as a sergeant of the reserve on 26 August 1939, but his unit did not leave Fulda at the start of the invasion of Poland on 1 September. In late September, with Poland nearly defeated, he arrived in Pabianice with a company under his orders and was appointed as the commander of the prisoner-of-war camp set up in the former Rudolf Kindler textile factory (Lager Pabianitz) and the oflag located in the nearby School No. 5 at 65 Zamkowa St, both organised as transit camps for captives taken at the Battle of the Bzura. He oversaw the construction of barbed wire fencing, watch towers and machine gun positions to guard the camp. While stationed in Pabianice, Hosenfeld recorded his "outrage" at the "rough treatment" of Jewish prisoners, and the "relish" of Polish observers. He considered the "terrible rage" of local ethnic Germans against the Poles justified by the presumed "bestial behaviour of the Poles who were irresponsibly incited" against Germans in the lead-up to the war. Hosenfeld permitted the families of inmates to visit them against the camp rules. He intervened to secure the release of several Poles from German custody, befriended their families, and would later lodge his wife with his Polish contacts.

From December 1939, he was stationed in Węgrów, where he remained until his battalion was moved another 30 km away to Jadów at the end of May 1940. He was finally transferred to Warsaw in July 1940, where he spent the rest of the war, for the most part, attached to Wachbataillon (guard battalion) 660, part of the Wach-Regiment Warschau (Warsaw Guard Regiment) in which he served as a staff officer and as the battalion sports officer. As an intelligence officer, he reported to the Stabsabteilung Ic (Feindaufklärung und Abwehr) in the Oberkommando der Wehrmacht. In late August and early September 1940, he acted as a liaison officer for the Wien-Film crew commissioned by the Reich Ministry of Public Enlightenment and Propaganda and helped it choose set locations across the General Government for the making of the anti-Polish propaganda film Homecoming (1941).

He ran the Wehrmacht sports school in Warsaw and was in charge of military sports events at the Polish Army Stadium, renamed the Wehrmacht Stadium. During the deportation and mass murder of Jews from the Warsaw Ghetto (codenamed Grossaktion Warsaw) in the summer of 1942, he organised a week-long sports competition featuring 1,200 military athletes, then left with his wife for a week's leave in Berlin. Following his return, he hid two surviving Jews, among them Leon Warm-Warczyński who had escaped a transport to the Treblinka extermination camp, on the sports school premises. Throughout the Warsaw period, he used his position to protect fugitives from the Gestapo, including at least one anti-Nazi ethnic German, by providing them with documents and jobs at the sports school.

Hosenfeld was promoted to captain of the reserve in 1942. In his diary from this period, he began to draw a moral equivalence between National Socialism and Communism, but expressed his pride in belonging to the "resilient" German nation and argued that the National Socialist idea was a lesser evil compared to losing the war. By the end of 1943, he noted down his hope for a coup within the Third Reich similar to Marshal Pietro Badoglio's takeover in Italy, leading to a separate peace between Germany and the Western Allies.

During the Warsaw Uprising in August and September 1944, Hosenfeld carried out counterintelligence tasks by interrogating Polish resistance fighters and civilians and Red Army soldiers, whom the German troops began to take prisoner in the second week of fighting. In letters to his family, he reported that he was unable to extract any information from a group of high school girls, whose religious devotion he noted, and claimed that he strove to save the girls' lives. He also compared the systematic destruction of Warsaw with the Allied area bombing of German cities. He described the insurgents as "bandits" using "misguided" civilians as human shields and asserted that the Wehrmacht had acted honourably in Warsaw. Only after the capitulation of the uprising did he express admiration for the "national spirit" of the Poles.

As the planned razing of Warsaw commenced in October 1944 as part of the Nazi defensive fortification project (Festung Warschau), Hosenfeld was assigned to take the Nazi and neutral press on a tour of the ruins. In mid-November 1944, he discovered Władysław Szpilman hiding in an abandoned attic at the Aleja Niepodległości 223 address, which he was tasked with preparing as headquarters for an army staff, and after testing Szpilman's piano playing abilities (with Chopin's Nocturne No. 20 in C♯ minor) he decided to help him. He allowed Szpilman to stay in the building undetected, gave him a coat, and supplied him with bread and jam for several weeks until assuming command of a company in the 9th Army.

=== Soviet captivity and death ===
Hosenfeld was captured by the Red Army at the head of his company after a brief skirmish near Błonie some 39 km west of Warsaw on 17 January 1945, one day after his retreat from the destroyed Polish capital. In May 1945, he was transferred to a camp for officers in Minsk, where he was kept in solitary confinement for six months and interrogated three times by the NKVD under the suspicion of having conducted intelligence activity against the Soviet Union. Once he returned to the main camp site in late 1945, his health improved and he was able to write letters to his family. In a 1946 letter to his wife in West Germany, Hosenfeld named the Jews who he had saved, and begged her to contact the Soviet authorities and ask them to arrange his release. His wife requested help from a former Nazi concentration camp inmate, the German Communist Karl Hörle, the head of the local chapter of the Association of Political Prisoners and Persecutees of the Nazi System, who eventually intervened on Hosenfeld's behalf with the authorities of the German Democratic Republic in October 1947. In July 1947, Hosenfeld underwent a major stroke and although he received prompt medical attention and recovered, he later experienced complications from the condition.

In mid-1950, the tribunal of the Belorussian Soviet Socialist Republic sentenced Hosenfeld in administrative process to 25 years in a labour camp for his involvement in a unit that committed war crimes. Hosenfeld was then sent to Volgograd in August 1950 to work on the rebuilding of the city and on the construction of the Volga–Don Canal. He was visited in November 1950 by Leon Warm-Warczyński, who proceeded to notify Szpilman about the identity and fate of his helper. Szpilman subsequently made an effort to secure Hosenfeld's release through Jakub Berman, a member of the Military Committee in the politburo of the Polish Workers' Party, but was told that the case was beyond the reach of the Polish Communist authorities, since Hosenfeld had been a spy. In June 1952, Hosenfeld's health deteriorated and he had to dictate his postcard to the family. He died of an aortic rupture in August 1952.

== Commemorations ==
In 2002, The Pianist, a film based on Szpilman's memoirs of the same name, portrayed Hosenfeld's rescue of Władysław Szpilman. Hosenfeld was played by Thomas Kretschmann.

In 2004, the Military History Research Office of the German Bundeswehr published Hosenfeld's letters and diary. Reviewing the volume for the Polish Institute of National Remembrance's journal, the Catholic theologian Winfried Lipscher described Hosenfeld as a model Catholic, worthy of canonisation, and suggested that he could serve as a "hero to Poles, Jews, and Germans".

In October 2007, Hosenfeld was posthumously honoured by the president of Poland Lech Kaczyński with a Commander’s Cross of the Order of Polonia Restituta (Polish: Krzyż Komandorski Orderu Odrodzenia Polski).

Szpilman's son, Andrzej Szpilman, had long called for Yad Vashem to recognize Hosenfeld as a Righteous Among the Nations, non-Jews who risked their lives to rescue Jews. On 25 November 2008, Yad Vashem posthumously recognised Hosenfeld as Righteous Among the Nations. On 19 June 2009, Israeli diplomats presented Hosenfeld's son, Detlev, with the award, in Berlin.

On 4 December 2011, a commemorative plaque in Polish and English was unveiled at 223 Niepodległości Avenue in Warsaw, the place where Hosenfeld discovered Szpilman, in the presence of Hosenfeld's daughter Jorinde.

Local inhabitants in Węgrów, where Hosenfeld was active during World War II, were reported in 2012 to have objected to what they saw as Hosenfeld's "idealisation," pointing out that he had praised Adolf Hitler in his writings.

== Awards and decorations ==
=== Awards ===
- Iron Cross of 1914, 2nd class (1917)
- Honor Cross of World War 1914/1918
- Wound Badge in Black (1918)
- Commander’s Cross of the Order of Polonia Restituta (Poland, October 2007)

=== Honors ===
- SA-Sports Badge in Bronze
- Righteous Among the Nations (25 November 2008)

== See also ==
- Oskar Schindler
- Albert Battel
- Max Liedtke
- Karl Plagge
- Albert Göring

== Sources ==
- Lipscher, Winfried (2004), "Niemiecki sprawiedliwy i powstanie warszawskie", Biuletyn Instytutu Pamięci Narodowej (8–9): 131–133
- Neugebauer, Karl-Volker (2009), "Größenwahn und Untergang. Der Zweite Weltkrieg 1939 bis 1945", in Neugebauer, Karl-Volker (ed.), Das Zeitalter der Weltkriege. Völker in Waffen, Grundkurs deutsche Militärgeschichte, 2, München: Oldenbourg, pp. 297–437, doi:10.1515/9783486850406-006
- Stargardt, Nicholas (2015), The German War: A Nation Under Arms, 1939–1945: Citizens and Soldiers, New York: Basic Books, ISBN 978-0-465-01899-4
- Szpilman, Władysław (2002), The Pianist: The Extraordinary True Story of One Man's Survival in Warsaw, 1939–1945 (2nd ed.), Picador, ISBN 978-0-312-31135-3 (The book includes a foreword by Andrzej Szpilman, excerpts from Hosenfeld's diary, and an epilogue by Wolf Biermann.)
- Vogel, Thomas, ed. (2004), Wilm Hosenfeld: "Ich versuche jeden zu retten" — Das Leben eines deutschen Offiziers in Briefen und Tagebüchern (in German), München: Militärgeschichtliches Forschungsamt, ISBN 3-421-05776-1
