= Czesław Lewicki =

Polish composer (1906–1979)

Czesław Lewicki (26 April 1906 – 16 March 1979) was a Polish composer. He has been recognized as one of the Polish Righteous Among the Nations for his efforts to rescue the Polish-Jewish composer Władysław Szpilman during the Holocaust in Poland.

== Biography ==
=== Before the war ===
Lewicki was born in Mołczany on 26 April 1906. In 1935 he graduated from the Warsaw Conservatory, where he studied under Walerian Bierdiajew.

From 1935 to 1938 he worked in Wilno (today Vilnius, Lithuania) as an orchestra conductor and lecturer at Karłowicz's Wilno Conservatory (Konserwatorium Wileńskie im. Karłowicza), as well as an conductor of the symphony orchestra of the Council of Artistic Associations (Rada Zrzeszeń Artystycznych) and the Vilnius Symphony Orchestra (Wileńskia Orkiestra Symfoniczna). In August 1938 he was an orchestra conductor for Polish Representative Ballet in Germany and Latvia. In 1938 he left Poland to study music in Paris. He returned to Poland before the war; until the outbreak of the war he was one of the conductors of the Polish Radio Symphony Orchestra.

=== World War II ===
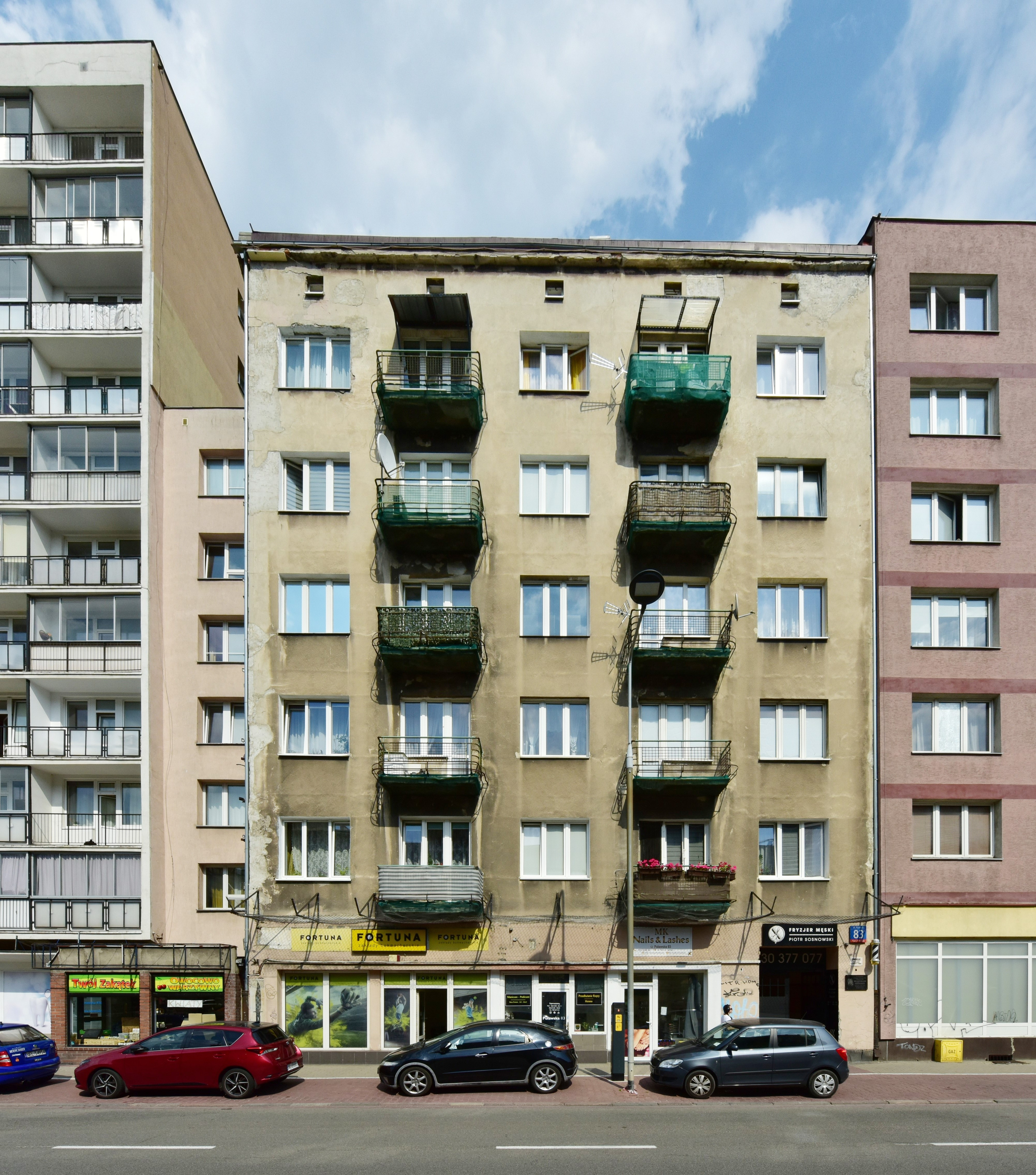
83 Puławska Street, Warsaw. In 1943, Władysław Szpilman hid in this building in Czesław Lewicki's studio apartment for several months.

In mid-February 1943, during the Warsaw Ghetto Uprising, Lewicki's colleague from the Polish Radio, Polish-Jewish composer Władysław Szpilman, was working outside the ghetto. Szpilman was able to contact his friend and colleague from the Radio, actor Andrzej Bogucki, who took him from his workplace. Bogucki and his wife Janina sheltered Szpilman in their apartment for two weeks. After that, on 27 February, they moved him to a bachelor's apartment of Lewicki's in Mokotów (Puławska Street 83), where he was able to stay for another five months. Lewicki regularly visited the apartment, bringing food and other necessities for Szpilman. In the aftermath of these events, Szpilman described Lewicki as a "close friend".

Lewicki was also active in the Polish resistance (Armia Krajowa) and became wanted by Gestapo. He carried a suicide pill in his teeth. In June he advised Szpilman to leave the apartment due to fear that Germans might come looking for him in that apartment (Szpilman chose to stay there until the situation forced him to leave it on 12 August). Some sources state that he had a wife, Helena, who also helped Szpilman, although another source states that Lewicki did not get married until after the war. Szpilman stayed in Helena's apartment after the incident of 12 August.

In 1944 Lewicki participated in the Warsaw Uprising.

In the 2002 movie The Pianist, some of Lewicki's story was merged into that of the character Marek Gębczyński. Lewicki's apartment is also featured in that movie, although in an incorrect location.

=== After the war ===
After World War II, he worked at the Polish radio and television industry in Warsaw, where he held positions such as a director, manager and music editor. In 1946, he became the director of the Polish Radio Warsaw II. He continued, although sporadically, as a conductor of symphony concerts. In later years, he worked at the Polish Film State Enterprise (Film Polski). In about 1954 or 1955 he became a musical advisor to the Central Office of Cinematography. Around 1964 he was the music director of Television Warsaw.

On 23 May 1978, Janina and Andrzej Bogucki and Czesław Lewicki were recognized by Yad Vashem as Righteous Among the Nations. They were among thirty or so non-Jewish Poles involved in helping Szpilman during the war.

Lewicki died on 16 March 1979 in Warsaw.
