= Wendy Lands =

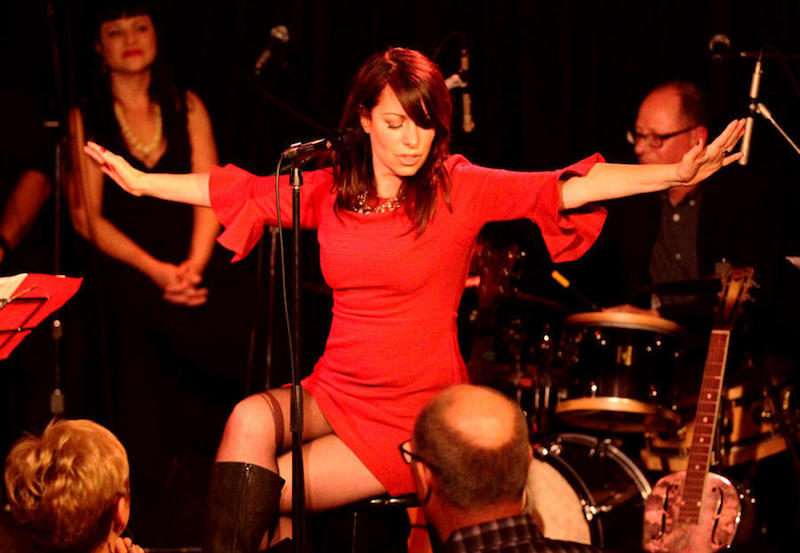
- Lands at Hugh's Room, Toronto, 2015

Background information
- Born: Montreal, Quebec, Canada
- Genres: Jazz, pop, rock
- Occupations: Singer, songwriter
- Years active: 1992–present
- Labels: Rebelette, EMI
- Website: wendylands.com

Wendy Lands is a Canadian singer and songwriter, most noted for receiving a Juno Award nomination for Best New Solo Artist in 1997.

== Career ==
Born in Montreal, Quebec, she moved to Toronto, Ontario to attend York University. While living in Toronto, she was a member of the pop band Double Dare and an understudy for the role of Eponine in a production of Les Misérables. She also began doing commercial voiceover work and recorded her debut album, Angels and Ordinary Men, between 1992 and 1994. One song from the recording sessions, a duet with Wayne St. John titled "All That I Know", was released to Canadian radio in 1992.

The album was released independently in 1995. Lands then signed a deal with EMI Records, which rereleased the album nationally in 1996. By the time of the album's wider release, however, Alanis Morissette had risen to international fame with Jagged Little Pill, and Lands was unfairly labeled by some critics as an imitation of Morissette; other critics, however, acknowledged superficial similarities in a couple of Lands' songs, but noted that the album as a whole was dominated by pop ballads rather than Morissette-style rock songs. Most notably, Billboard called it "one of the most impressive Canadian recordings in years".

The album produced two Top 40 hits in RPM, with lead single "Little Sins" peaking at No. 27 the week of 23 September 1996 and the title track peaking at #35 the week of 2 June 1997. The title track also peaked at No. 34 in the magazine's adult contemporary charts the week of 16 June 1997.

She supported the album with a Canadian tour, both on her own and as an opening act for Jann Arden and Kim Stockwood. Angels and Ordinary Men was released internationally in 1997. In 1998, Lands also received two Canadian Radio Music Award nominations for Best New Artist in the contemporary hit radio and adult contemporary categories. During this time, she also recorded a number of commercial voiceovers for companies including Bell Canada.

She then moved to Los Angeles for a number of years, writing songs with Paul Williams, Melissa Manchester, and Larry John McNally and continuing to do voiceover work in commercials. She did not record or release another album until 2002, when producer John Leftwich selected her to sing a number of vocal compositions by Władysław Szpilman for an album released as a promotional tie-in to the biographical film The Pianist.

Lands moved back to Toronto in 2006, and has since released two further albums; Mumble and Altitude.

== Discography ==
- Angels and Ordinary Men (EMI, 1995)
- Wendy Lands Sings the Music of the Pianist Wladyslaw Szpilman (Hip-O, 2002)
- Mumble (Rebelette, 2011)
- Altitude (2015)
