= Władysław Szpilman =

Polish pianist, composer and Holocaust survivor (1911–2000)

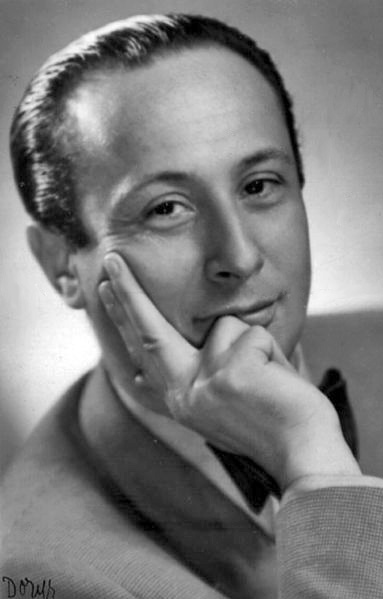
- Szpilman c. 1940
- Born: 5 December 1911; Sosnowiec, Congress Poland, Russian Empire
- Died: 6 July 2000 (aged 88); Warsaw, Poland
- Resting place: Powązki Military Cemetery, Warsaw
- Citizenship: Polish
- Occupations: Composer, pianist, author
- Years active: 1930–2000
- Spouse: Halina Grzecznarowska Szpilman (m. 1950)
- Children: 2 (incl. Andrzej)

Władysław Szpilman (Polish pronunciation: [vwaˈdɨswaf ˈʂpilman]; 5 December 1911 – 6 July 2000) was a Polish Jewish pianist, classical composer and Holocaust survivor. Szpilman is widely known as the central figure in the Roman Polanski film The Pianist, which was based on his autobiographical account of how he survived the German occupation of Warsaw and the Warsaw Uprising.

Szpilman studied piano at music academies in Berlin and Warsaw. He became a popular performer on Polish Radio and in concert. Confined within the Warsaw Ghetto after the German invasion of Poland, Szpilman spent two years in hiding. Following the Warsaw Uprising and the subsequent destruction of the city, he was helped by Wilm Hosenfeld, a German officer who detested Nazi policies. After World War II, Szpilman resumed his career on Polish Radio. Szpilman was also a prolific composer; his output included hundreds of songs and many orchestral pieces. Szpilman was also recognized as the most famous of the "Robinson Crusoes", a term referring to Poles who survived in the ruins of Warsaw after the Warsaw Uprising.

== Career as a pianist ==
Szpilman began his study of the piano at the Chopin Academy of Music in Warsaw, Poland, where he studied piano with Aleksander Michałowski and Józef Śmidowicz, first- and second-generation pupils of Franz Liszt. In 1931, he was a student of the prestigious Academy of Arts in Berlin, Germany, where he studied with Artur Schnabel, Franz Schreker, and Leonid Kreutzer. After Adolf Hitler was appointed Chancellor of Germany in 1933, Szpilman returned to Warsaw, where he quickly became a celebrated pianist and composer of both classical and popular music. Primarily a soloist, he was also the chamber music partner of such acclaimed violinists as Roman Totenberg, Ida Haendel and Henryk Szeryng, and in 1934, he toured Poland with U.S. violinist, Bronislav Gimpel.

On 5 April 1935, Szpilman joined the Polish Radio, where he worked as a pianist performing classical and jazz music. His compositions at this time included orchestral works, piano pieces, and also music for films, as well as roughly 50 songs, many of which became quite popular in Poland. At the time of the German invasion of Poland in September 1939, he was a celebrity and a featured soloist at the Polskie Radio, which was bombed on 23 September 1939, shortly after broadcasting the last Chopin recital played by Szpilman. The Nazi occupiers established the General Government, and created ghettos in many Polish cities, including Warsaw. Szpilman and his family did not yet need to find a new residence, as their apartment was already in the ghetto area.

== Survival during the Holocaust ==
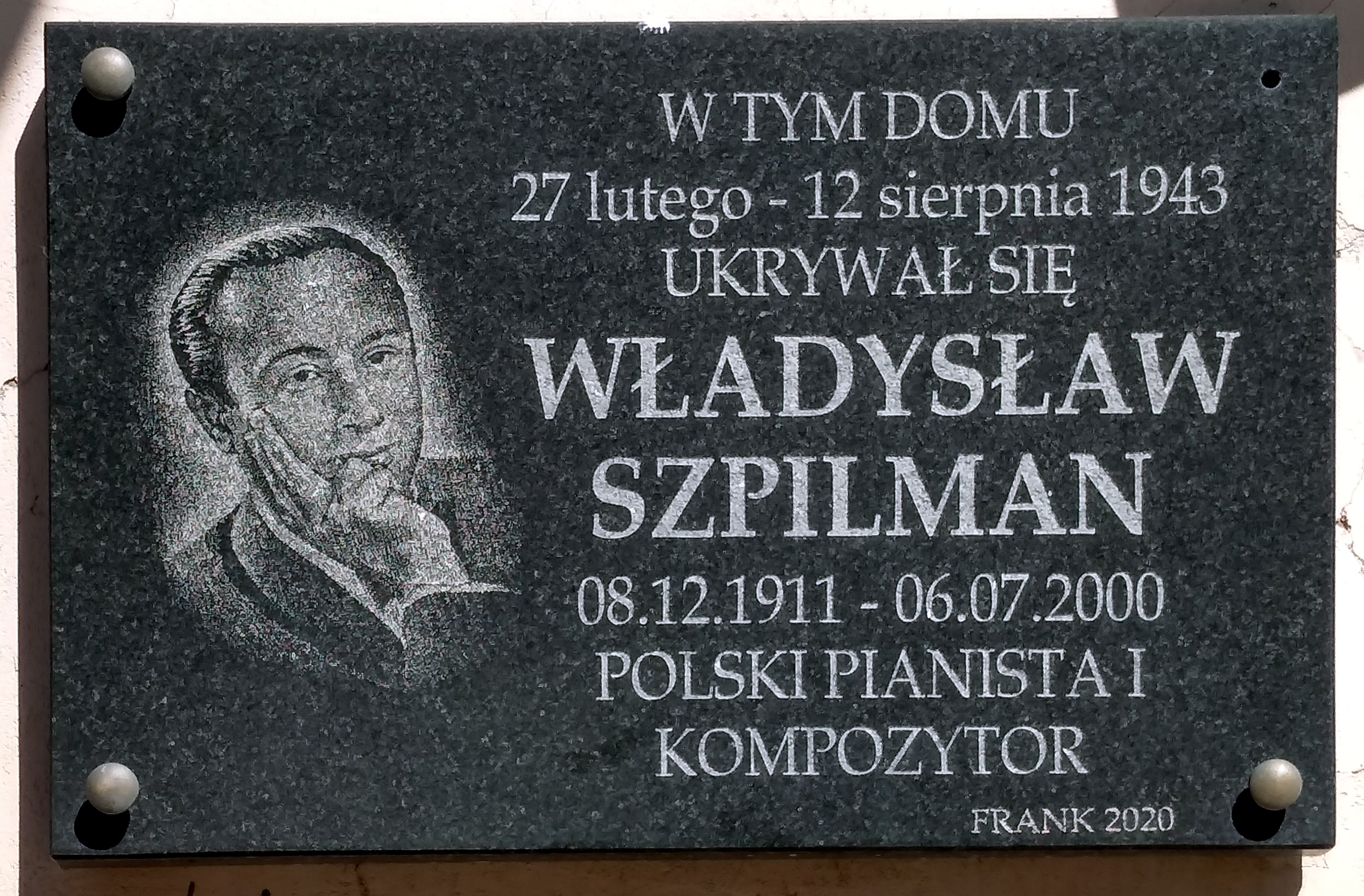
Plaque on a house in Warsaw where Szpilman was hiding in 1943 in the studio of his friend, composer Czesław Lewicki

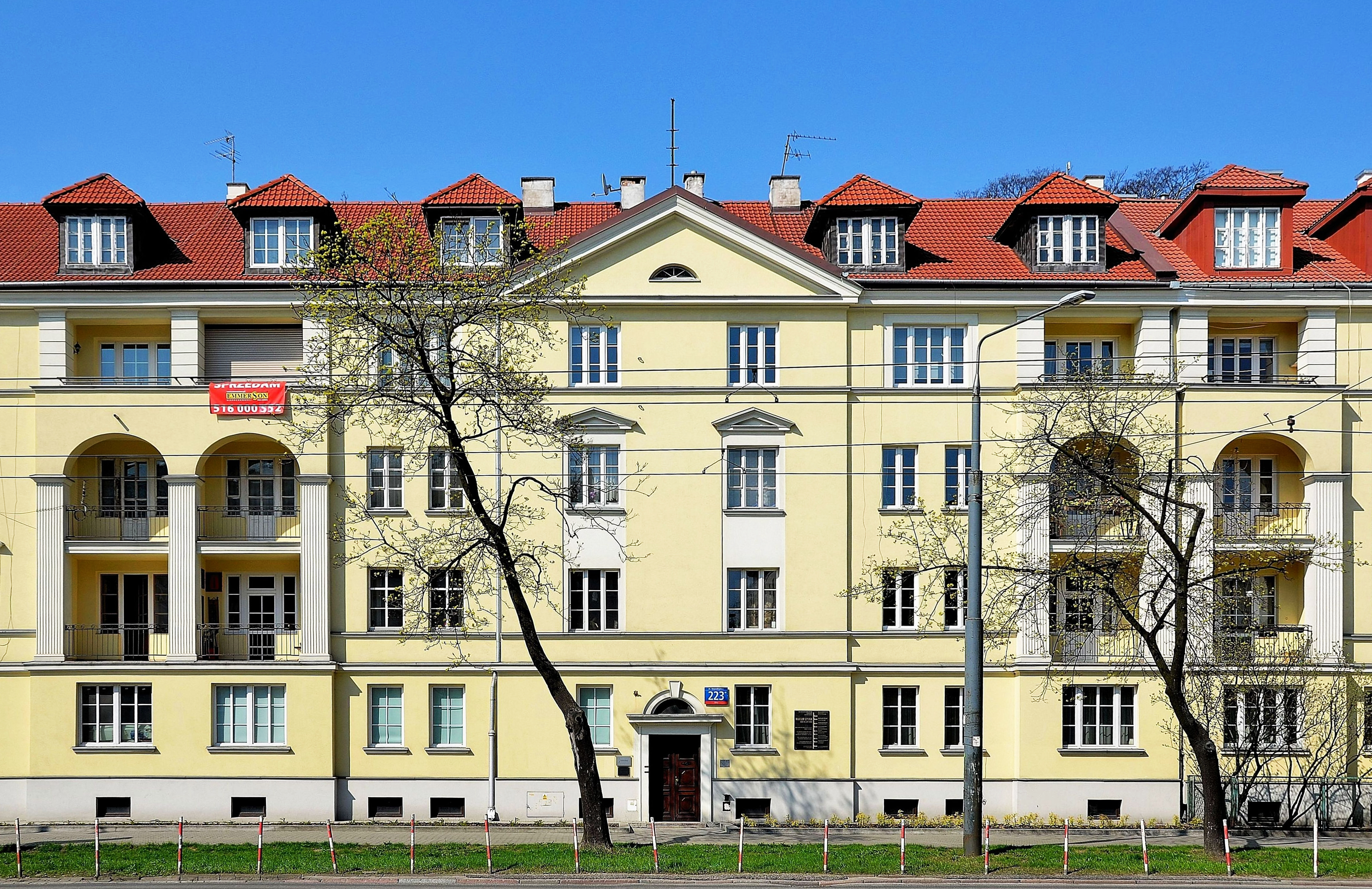
House at 223 Niepodległości Alley in Warsaw where in 1944 Szpilman met Wilm Hosenfeld

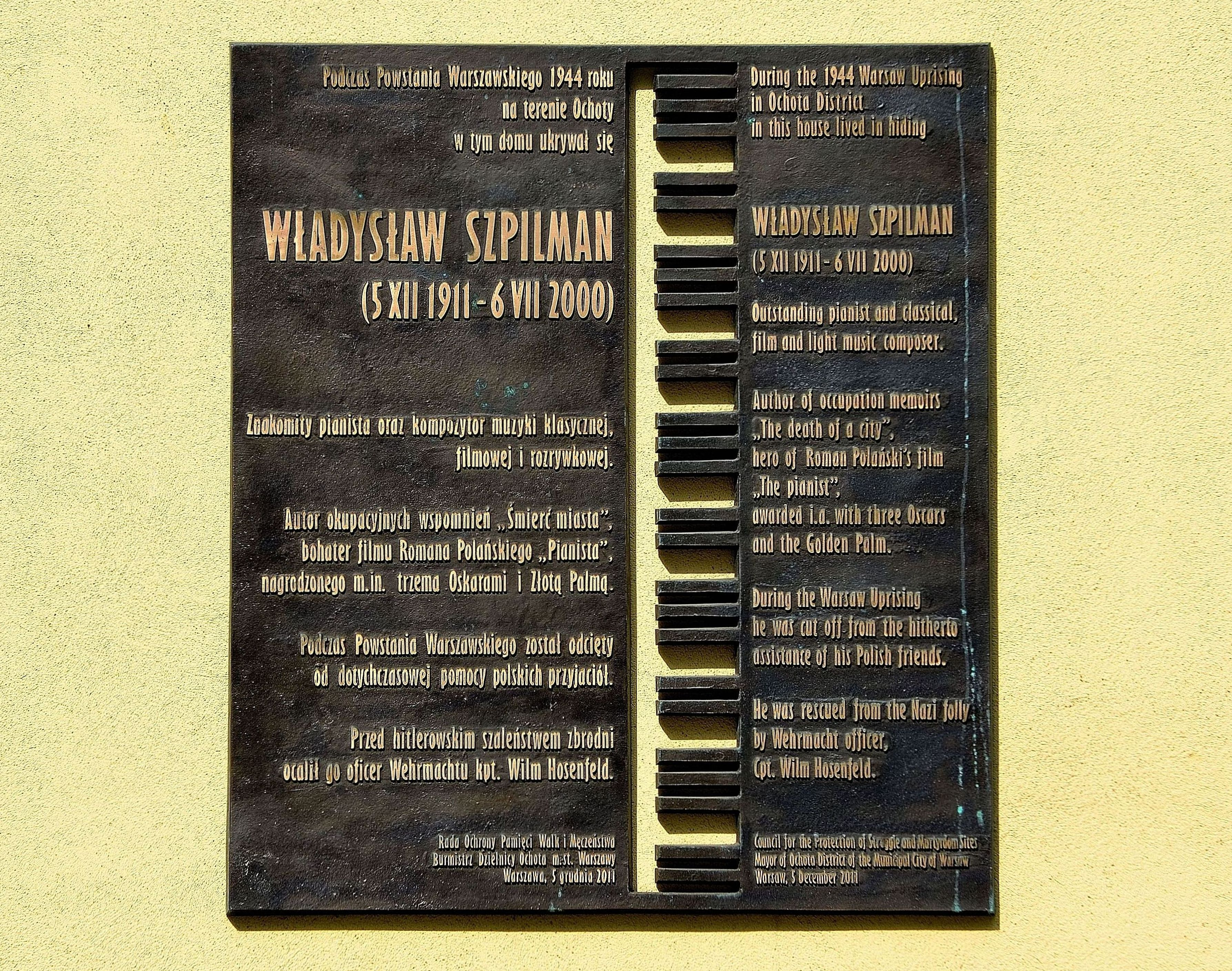
Commemorative plaque on the building

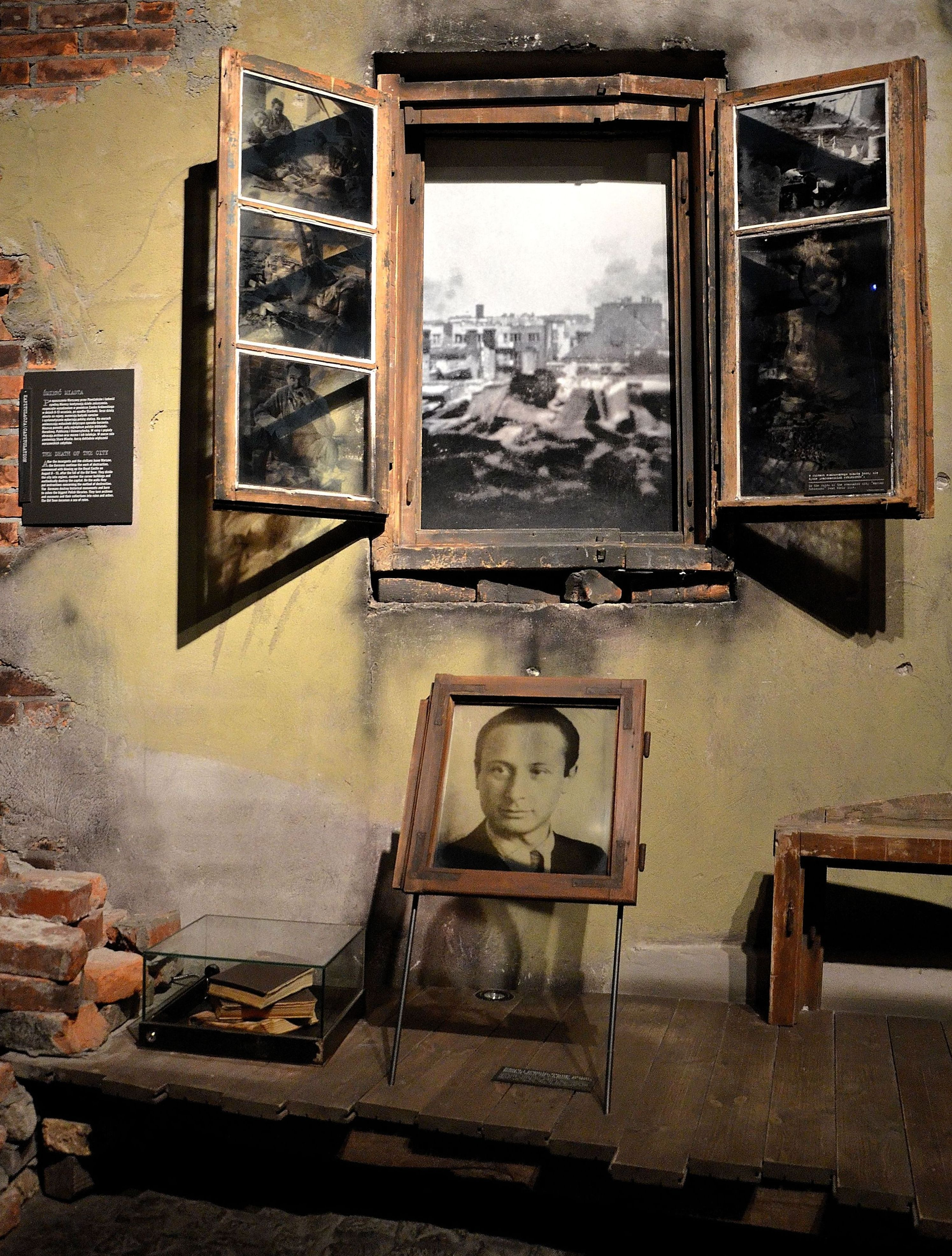
Photo of Szpilman, the most famous of Warsaw Robinsons, at the Warsaw Uprising Museum

Władysław Szpilman and his family, along with all other Jews living in Warsaw, were forced to move into a "Jewish quarter" – the Warsaw Ghetto – on 31 October 1940. Once all the Jews were confined within the ghetto, a wall was constructed to separate them from the rest of the Nazi German-occupied city. Szpilman managed to find work as a musician to support his family, which included his mother, father, brother Henryk, and two sisters, Regina and Halina. He first worked at the Nowoczesna Cafe, where the patrons sometimes ignored his playing in order to conduct business, as he recalled in the memoir.

Szpilman later played in a cafe on Sienna Street and after 1942 in the Sztuka Cafe on Leszno Street as well. In these last two cafes he performed chamber music with violinist Zygmunt Lederman, performed in the piano duo with Andrzej Goldfeder, and played with other musicians as well.

Everyone in his family was deported in 1942 to Treblinka, an extermination camp within German-occupied Poland approximately 80 km (50 mi) northeast of Warsaw. A member of the Jewish Police assisting in deportations, who recognized Szpilman, pulled him from a line of people—including his parents, brother, and two sisters—being loaded onto a train at the transport site (which, as in other ghettos, was called the Umschlagplatz). None of Szpilman's family members survived the war. Szpilman stayed in the ghetto as a labourer, and helped smuggle in weapons for the coming Jewish resistance uprising. Szpilman remained in the Warsaw Ghetto until 13 February 1943, shortly before it was abolished after the deportation of most of its inhabitants in April–May 1943.

Szpilman found places to hide in Warsaw and survived with the help of his friends from Polish Radio and fellow musicians such as Andrzej Bogucki and his wife Janina, Czesław Lewicki, and Helena Lewicka supported by Edmund Rudnicki, Witold Lutosławski, Eugenia Umińska, Piotr Perkowski, and Irena Sendler. About thirty non-Jewish Poles were involved in helping Szpilman during the war.

He evaded capture several times. Beginning in August 1944, Szpilman was hiding out in an abandoned building at Aleja Niepodległości Street 223. In November, he was discovered there by a German officer, Captain Wilm Hosenfeld, who asked him to play the piano in the building to corroborate his music claims. To Szpilman's surprise, Hosenfeld helped him, bringing him food and supplies on several occasions until the Germans retreated from Warsaw.

== Polish Radio ==
Szpilman started playing for Polish Radio in 1935 as their house pianist. In 1939, on 23 September, Szpilman was in the middle of broadcasting when Germans opened fire on the studio and he was forced to stop playing. This was the last live music broadcast that was heard until the war's end. When Szpilman resumed his job at Polish Radio in 1945, he did so by carrying on where he left off six years before: poignantly, he opened the first transmission by once again playing Chopin's Nocturne in C-sharp Minor (Lento con gran espressione).

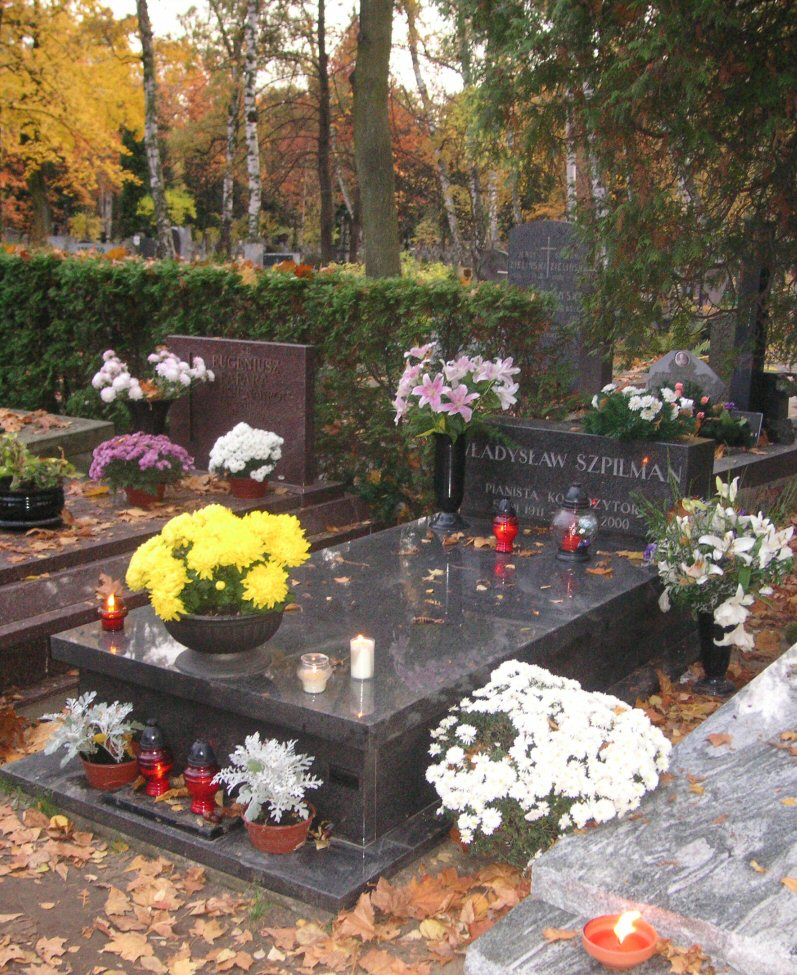
Władysław Szpilman's grave in Powązki Military Cemetery in Warsaw

From 1945 to 1963, Szpilman was director of the Popular Music Department at Polish Radio. Szpilman performed at the same time as a concert pianist and chamber musician in Poland, as well as throughout Europe, Asia, and America. During this period, he composed several symphonic works and about 500 other compositions that are still popular in Poland today. He also wrote music for radio plays and films and in 1961, he created the International Song Contest in Sopot, Poland, which has been produced every summer for more than 50 years. Szpilman and Bronislav Gimpel founded the Warsaw Piano Quintet in 1963 with which Szpilman performed more than 2000 concerts worldwide until 1986 in such places as Royal Festival Hall in London; Salle Pleyel and Salle Gaveau in Paris; Herkules Saal in Munich; as well as the Salzburger Festspiele, Brahmstage Baden-Baden, Musikhalle Hamburg a.o.

== Compositions ==
From his early Berlin years, Szpilman never gave up the will to write music, even when living in the Warsaw Ghetto. His compositions include orchestral works, concertos, piano pieces, but also significant amounts of music for radio plays and films, as well as around 500 songs. More than 100 of these are very well known as hits and evergreens in Poland. In the 1950s, he wrote about 40 songs for children, for which he received an award from the Polish Composers Union in 1955.

His son Andrzej commented in 1998 that Szpilman's works did not reach a larger audience outside Poland, attributing this to the "division of Europe into two halves culturally as well as politically" after the war. His father "shaped the Polish popular music scene over several decades—but the western frontier of Poland constituted a barrier" to music from the Eastern bloc countries. (Andrzej Szpilman's "Foreword" to the 1999 edition of The Pianist, p. 8)

Szpilman's compositions include the suite for piano "Life of the Machines" 1932, Violin Concerto 1933, "Waltzer in the Olden Style" 1937, film soundtracks: "Świt, dzień i noc Palestyny" (1934), Wrzos (1938) and Doctor Murek (1939), Concertino for Piano and Orchestra (1940), Paraphrase on Own Themes (1948) "Ouverture for Symphonic Orchestra" (1968) and many very popular songs in Poland. His works are now published in printed editions by Boosey & Hawkes/Bote & Bock Music Publishers in New York, Berlin, and London.

In 1961, he initiated and organized the Sopot International Song Festival produced in Poland every summer, now for more than 50 years. He founded the Polish Union of Authors of Popular Music.

== Memoir ==
The Death of a City (original "Śmierć miasta") was written by Wladyslaw Szpilman and elaborated by Jerzy Waldorff shortly after the war ended, and first printed in 1946 by the publishing house Wiedza. The book was censored by Stalinist authorities for political reasons. For example, the nationality of benevolent German officer Wilm Hosenfeld was changed to Austrian. As the East German dissident singer-songwriter Wolf Biermann observed in his epilogue for the 1999 English-language edition: "Directly after the war it was impossible to publish a book in Poland which presented a German officer as a brave and helpful man," and an Austrian hero would be "not quite so bad." Biermann added caustically, "In the years of the Cold War Austria and East Germany were linked by a common piece of hypocrisy: both pretended to have been forcibly occupied by Hitler's Germany."

In 1998, Szpilman's son Andrzej published a new extended edition of his father's memoir, first in German translation by Karin Wolff as Das wunderbare Überleben (The Miraculous Survival) by a German publishing house Ullstein Verlag; and then in English translation by Anthea Bell as The Pianist with Epilogue by Wolf Biermann. In March 1999 Władysław Szpilman visited London for Jewish Book Week, where he met English readers to mark the publication of the book in Great Britain. It was later published in more than 35 languages, named Best book of the year by Los Angeles Times, Sunday Times, Boston Globe, The Guardian, The Economist, Library Journal, and won the Annual Jewish-Quarterly Wingate Prize 2000, and Best book of the year 2001 by magazines Lire and Elle (Paris) in 2002. The New Polish edition, Pianista : warszawskie wspomnienia 1939–1945 (Kraków: Znak, 2000) became a number 1 on the bestseller list of the Polish newspaper Rzeczpospolita for 3 years in 2001–2003.

As it reached a much larger audience, Szpilman's memoir was widely praised. Britain's Independent described it as "a compelling, harrowing masterpiece"; it is "one of the most powerful accounts ever written" of the era declared another leading British daily. The book's description of the famed Warsaw teacher and writer Janusz Korczak has been described as "overwhelmingly powerful and poignant." Korczak declined to save himself from deportation to Treblinka; instead, he walked with the children of his orphanage to the deportation site and ultimately escorted them "into the next world," as Szpilman related:

One day, around 5th August, when I had taken a brief rest from work and was walking down Gęsia Street, I happened to see Janusz Korczak and his orphans leaving the ghetto. The evacuation of the Jewish orphanage run by Janusz Korczak had been ordered for that morning.

The children were to have been taken away alone. He had the chance to save himself, and it was only with difficulty that he persuaded the Germans to take him, too. He had spent long years of his life with children and now, on this last journey, he could not leave them alone. He wanted to ease things for them.

He told the orphans they were going out into the country, so they ought to be cheerful. At last they would be able to exchange the horrible suffocating city walls for meadows of flowers, streams where they could bathe, woods full of berries and mushrooms. He told them to wear their best clothes, and so they came out into the yard, two by two, nicely dressed and in a happy mood. The little column was led by an SS man who loved children, as Germans do, even those he was about to see on their way into the next world. He took a special liking to a boy of twelve, a violinist who had his instrument under his arm. The SS man told him to go to the head of the procession of children and play – and so they set off.

When I met them in Gęsia Street, the smiling children were singing in chorus, the little violinist was playing for them and Korczak was carrying two of the smallest infants, who were beaming too, and telling them some amusing story.

I am sure that even in the gas chamber, as the Zyklon B gas was stifling childish throats and striking terror instead of hope into the orphans' hearts, the Old Doctor must have whispered with one last effort, ‘it's all right, children, it will be all right’. So that at least he could spare his little charges the fear of passing from life to death." – The Pianist, pp. 95-96.

The 1999 English-language edition also includes excerpts from Wilm Hosenfeld's diary (1942–44). Biermann's Epilogue gives further insight into Hosenfeld's deeds and his character. He aided several other would-be victims in Warsaw; Hosenfeld nonetheless died (in 1952) after seven years in Soviet captivity, despite the efforts of Szpilman to help him.

Although it concludes with his survival, Szpilman declined to conclude his memoir on a happy note. In the final paragraphs, he walks the streets of an abandoned and devastated Warsaw: "A stormy wind rattled the scrap-iron in the ruins, whistling and howling through the charred cavities of the windows. Twilight came on. Snow fell from the darkening, leaden sky." As one reviewer noted, "these final sentences distill the style of this astonishing and unforgettable book. Concise yet highly evocative; measured and somewhat detached, yet possessing a poeticism and a consistent spiritual tenor and strength."

=== Film adaptation ===
In 2002, the Polish-French filmmaker, Roman Polanski, directed a screen version of the book. The movie won three Academy Awards in 2003 – Oscars for best director; best actor, and best adapted screenplay, the British Academy of Film and Television Arts Best Film Award, and the Palme d'Or at the Cannes Film Festival. Polanski escaped the Kraków Ghetto and survived the Nazi genocides but his mother was killed by the German occupiers. Polanski's film closely follows the book's style and details. Adrien Brody, accepting the Oscar for Best Actor in a Leading Role for The Pianist, said – ..."This film would not be possible without the blueprint provided by Wladyslaw Szpilman. This is a tribute to his survival."

Szpilman's son, Andrzej Szpilman, compiled and released a CD with the most popular songs Szpilman had composed under the title Wendy Lands Sings the Songs of the Pianist (Universal Music). Other CDs with the works of Szpilman include Works for Piano and Orchestra by Władysław Szpilman with Ewa Kupiec (piano), John Axelrod (director), and the Berlin Radio Symphony Orchestra (2004) (Sony classical) and the Original recordings of The Pianist and Władysław Szpilman-Legendary recordings (Sony classical). In November 1998, Szpilman was honored by the president of Poland with a Commander's Cross with Star of the Order of Polonia Restituta.

== Death and tributes ==
Szpilman died of natural causes in Warsaw on 6 July 2000, aged 88. His death was not widely reported at the time. He is buried at Powązki Military Cemetery. On 25 September 2011, Polish Radio’s Studio 1 was renamed for Władysław Szpilman. On 4 December 2011, a commemorative plaque to Szpilman, engraved in Polish and English, was unveiled at 223 Niepodległości Avenue in Warsaw, in the presence of his wife Halina Szpilman and son Andrzej, and Wilm Hosenfeld's daughter Jorinde Krejci-Hosenfeld. The next day, on the exact centenary of Szpilman's birth, Polish President Bronisław Komorowski met Szpilman's widow and son, and Krejci-Hosenfeld.

Uri Caine, an American classical and jazz pianist and composer, created his own interpretations of Szpilman’s works in a variety of genres. The CD of Caine's concert was released on 24 February 2014.

== Recordings ==
- CD "F.Chopin – Works" - National Edition – F.Chopin – Piano trio und Introduction und Polonaise – W. Szpilman, T. Wronski, A. Ciechanski, Muza Warsaw 1958 and 2002
- CD "J. Brahms – Piano Quintett" The Warsaw Piano Quintett, Muza Warsaw 1976
- CD "Wladyslaw Szpilman – Ein musikalisches Portrait" Works by Szpilman, Rachmaninov und Chopin, Alinamusic Hamburg 1998
- CD Władysław Szpilman – Portret [5 CD Box-Set] Polskie Radio Warszawa 2000
- CD Wladyslaw Szpilman. The Original Recordings of the Pianist. Sony Classical 2002
- CD The Pianist [Soundtrack] Sony Classical 2002
- CD Songs of Wladyslaw Szpilman – sings Wendy Lands, Universal Music USA 2003
- CD Works For Piano & Orchestra Sony Classical 2004
- CD Władysław Szpilman – Legendary Recordings [3 CD Box-Set] Sony Classical 2005

== Selected published works ==
- Władysław Szpilman: Suite. The Life of the Machines for Piano (1933). Boosey & Hawkes Berlin/New York 2004 ISBN 3-7931-3077-0
- Władysław Szpilman: Concertino, Piano and Orchestra, Piano parts, Schott Mainz 2004 ISBN 3-7931-3086-X
- Władysław Szpilman: Concertino, Piano and Orchestra, Partitur Schott Mainz 2004 ISBN 3-7931-3079-7
- My memories of you. 16 selected songs by The Pianist Władysław Szpilman Boosey & Hawkes Berlin/New York 2003 ISBN 3-7931-3085-1

== See also ==
- 9973 Szpilman (main belt asteroid)
- Andrzej Bogucki
