= Andrzej Bogucki =

Polish actor (1904–1978)

- Bogucki on the screen.
- Born: 11 November 1904; Warsaw, Congress Poland
- Died: 29 July 1978 (aged 73); Warsaw, Polish People's Republic
- Resting place: Powązki Cemetery, Warsaw
- Occupations: Actor, singer, songwriter
- Known for: Own career and for helping pianist Władysław Szpilman
- Spouse: Janina Bogucka

Andrzej Bogucki (11 November 1904 – 29 July 1978) was a Polish television, stage and film actor, as well as operetta singer and songwriter, sometimes referred to as "The Polish Chevalier".

Bogucki and his wife Janina née Godlewska (8 March 1908 – 19 June 1992) are known for helping and hiding the Polish Jewish pianist Władysław Szpilman during the German occupation of Poland. Szpilman's life inspired the 2002 film The Pianist, and both Bogucki and his wife were portrayed in the film.

Although he lived in Warsaw for most of his life, Bogucki also worked in several other cities. He lived in Warsaw's Mariensztat neighborhood from 1947 until the end of his life, and he is buried in the Powązki Cemetery in the western part of Warsaw.

Bogucki was awarded the Order of Polonia Restituta for his career and actions during World War II. In 1978 the Yad Vashem institute awarded him and his wife the Righteous Among the Nations award, an award given to non-Jewish people who helped Jews during the German persecution.

== Early life ==
Bogucki was born to a family with long-standing traditions in theatre and stage. His parents were the actors Stanisław Bogucki and Róża Bogucka-Rapacka. He was the grandson of the famous Polish actor and director Wincenty Rapacki.

Bogucki attended and graduated as a cavalry officer from the Officer's Cadet School in Grudziądz. While at school he participated in equestrian competitions and became an officer in the Polish Army. He served in the 7th Regiment Cavalry in Mińsk Mazowiecki, but was discharged for health reasons in 1929. In the same year, he began appearing in stage plays for children. From then on, he focused on his acting career.

== World War II ==
During World War II, Bogucki and his wife were involved with the anti-German Polish resistance movement, the Armia Krajowa (Home Army). In February 1944 they were contacted through members of the Jewish underground by their friend, the pianist Władysław Szpilman, who was working as a slave laborer as one of the remaining Jews in the Warsaw Ghetto. Anticipating that the Germans were planning to liquidate even the slave workers (most other Jews had already been deported to Treblinka), Szpilman, with help from Bogucki, escaped the ghetto and hid on the non-Jewish side of Warsaw. With help from Bogucki, Janina and others, including Czesław Lewicki, Szpilman survived the war. The story of his life was later the basis for the 2002 film The Pianist. They were among thirty or so non-Jewish Poles involving in helping Szpilman during the war.

After the war, in the 1950s Szpilman composed songs especially for Andrzej and Janina, including the popular Czerwony autobus (Red bus).

Bogucki was awarded the Order of Polonia Restituta for his career and actions during World War II. In 1978 the Yad Vashem institute awarded him and his wife the Righteous Among the Nations award, an award given to non-Jewish people who helped Jews during the German persecution.

== Work ==
=== Theatre ===
Bogucki began working onstage on 30 April 1930. He performed at the Polish Theatre in Warsaw for three years between 1930 and 1933 and later worked at the New Comedy Theater between 1933 and 1934. He also worked for theaters in Łódź and Kraków.

After the end of World War II, he returned to the stage at the Polish Army Theatre in Łódź, where he performed between 1945 and 1947. He went on to work in several other theaters, including the National Theater, Warsaw, where he played from 1969 until his death in 1978.

=== Career as a singer ===
Bogucki began his singing career in 1931 at the Banda Theater, where he remained for a year until 1932. It was his distinctive singing voice that brought him most of his popularity.

After 1945, he continued to write songs and launched a number of hits in the radio.

He was a longtime employee of the Polish Radio. He also worked with Radio Theatre of the Imagination as a presenter, singer and reciter, and as a popularizer of music and literature.

== Filmography ==
- 1917 – Pokój nr 13, Tajemnica Alei Ujazdowskich, Wanda Barska, Tajemnica hotelu w Tajemnice Warszawy
- 1933 – Jego ekscelencja subiekt (His Excellency, The Shop Assistant)
- 1933 – Szpieg w masce
- 1934 – Uhlan's Pledge
- 1935 – Manewry miłosne
- 1936 – Pan Twardowski
- 1936 – Bolek i Lolek
- 1937 – Pan redaktor szaleje
- 1937 – Niedorajda
- 1938 – Za winy niepopełnione
- 1939 – Złota Maska
- 1939 - The Vagabonds
- 1953 – Żołnierz zwycięstwa
- 1953 – Sprawa do załatwienia
- 1956 – Nikodem Dyzma
- 1959 – Małpa w kąpieli
- 1968 – Wniebowstąpienie
- 1970 – Epilog norymberski
- 1975 – Jej powrót
- 1976 – Zagrożenie

=== Theatre on television ===
- 1955 – Wesele
- 1962 – Romantyczni
- 1963 – Taniec księżniczki
- 1963 – Syn marnotrawny
- 1963 – Pan Benet
- 1964 – Don Juan, czyli Kamienny gość
- 1965 – Skąpiec
- 1966 – Szwejk na tyłach
- 1966 – Katarynka jako Radca
- 1969 – Mieszczanin szlachcicem
- 1970 – Dziewczęta z Nowolipek
- 1972 – Zabezpieczenie macierzyństwa
- 1972 – Elektra
- 1973 – Norwid
- 1974 – Twarz pokerzysty
- 1975 – Emancypantki
- 1976 – Jedenaste przykazanie
- 1977 – Dyplomaci i sztabowcy w Przed burzą
- 1978 – Filomena Marturano

=== Television films and series ===
- 1965 – Ping-Pong w Perły i dukaty
- 1968 – Stawka większa niż życie
- 1973 – Wielka miłość Balzaka
- 1973 – Janosik (TV series)
- 1975 – Czterdziestolatek
- 1977 – Noce i dnie (TV series)
- 1977 – Lalka (TV series)
- 1981 – Najdłuższa wojna nowoczesnej Europy

== See also ==
- List of recipients of the Order of Polonia Restituta
