= Nocturne in C-sharp minor, Op. posth. (Chopin) =

Composition for piano by Frédéric Chopin

Nocturne in C♯ minor
- by Frédéric Chopin
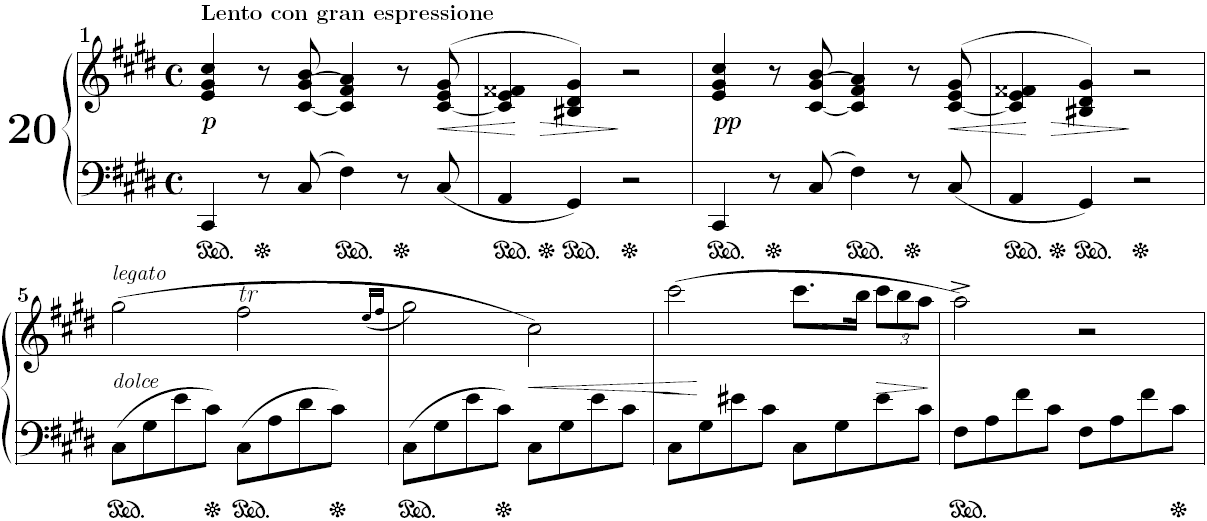
- Opening bars of Nocturne 20
- Other name: Reminiscence
- Key: C♯ minor
- Catalogue: Brown index: B. 49; Chopin National Edition: WN 37; Krystyna Kobylańska: KK IVa/16; Chomiński: P. 1/16
- Style: Romantic music Nocturne
- Composed: 1830
- Movements: One

Nocturne No. 20 in C♯ minor, performed by Aaron Dunn.

The Lento con gran espressione (or Nocturne No. 20 in C♯ minor, Op. posthumous), is a solo piano piece composed by Frédéric Chopin in 1830. It was published posthumously in 1875.

== Background ==
Chopin composed the piece shortly after arriving in Vienna in 1830. He sent it to his older sister Ludwika Chopin with the dedication, "For my sister Ludwika to practise before she takes on my second Concerto". She catalogued it: "Lento, of a nocturne character".

The November Uprising in Poland occurred shortly after Chopin arrived in Vienna. The piece is sometimes seen as a reflection of the composer's homesickness and isolation after learning of the revolt. The title Reminiscence or Reminiscence Nocturne is associated with this interpretation of the music. The humour of the work's dance-like middle section leads some to believe it was written before Chopin learned of the violence back home.

During his life, Chopin published 18 nocturnes under eight opus numbers. Chopin biographer Marceli Antoni Szulc came across the manuscript in 1875 and persuaded Jarosław Leitgeber to publish it. The score was titled Adagio. Ludwika's taxonomy eventually became the standard, and the piece is classed as a nocturne. Its most common title derives from the tempo marking Lento con gran espressione.

Mily Balakirev premiered the piece on October 17, 1894, 45 years after Chopin's death. The performance celebrated the unveiling of a monument to the composer in his birthplace, Żelazowa Wola.

The manuscript is housed at the Valldemossa Charterhouse in Spain. It is part of the Anne-Marie Boutroux de Ferrà Collection.

== Musical structure ==
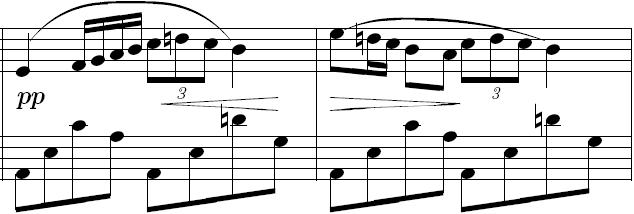
Quotation of Piano Concerto No. 2 in the Nocturne (mm. 21–22).

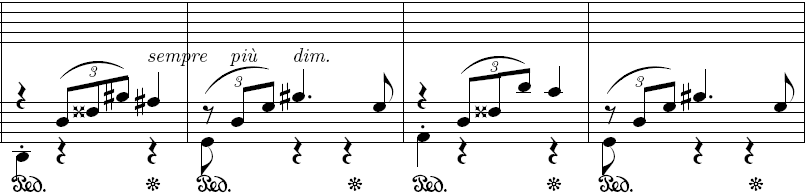
Quotation of Piano Concerto No. 2 "village dance" rhythm in the Nocturne (mm. 35–38).

The score is highly autobiographical with several quotations from Chopin's other compositions. After a quiet introduction, the main theme starts at bar 5. The left hand slurs arpeggios throughout the section.

As Chopin hinted in his dedication, the middle section rehearses fragments from his Piano Concerto No. 2, which was composed a year earlier. He begins in bars 21 and 22 by quoting the main theme of the concerto's third movement. The melody is originally in 3/4, and Chopin notated it that way in his manuscript, while maintaining the common time in the left hand's accompaniment. He consolidated the time signatures in an 1836 revision (this manuscript is now lost).

In bars 23–24, Chopin articulates the second subject of the piano concerto's first movement. In bar 30, he recalls the music of his song "Życzenie" (A Maiden's wish, 1829). He returns to the piano concerto's third movement and quotes its "village dance" scherzando, a clear evocation of his home country. The composer's nostalgia dissipates through a broken chord which evokes the conclusion of the piano concerto's second movement. The Nocturne's original theme returns before the piece concludes with a coda ornamented with sweeping scales in the right hand and a picardy third on the C♯ major chord, evoking the same broken chord texture that ended the middle section.

== During the Holocaust ==
On September 23, 1939, Polish-Jewish pianist Władysław Szpilman's performance of Chopin's Nocturne in C♯ minor, which was being broadcast live on Polskie Radio, was interrupted by the German invasion of Warsaw. Later, during the final months of World War II, German army officer Wilm Hosenfeld discovered Szpilman hiding in an abandoned house in the Warsaw Ghetto, which had been destroyed during the Warsaw Ghetto Uprising. When Szpilman described himself as a pianist, Hosenfeld asked him to play something on the house's grand piano. Szpilman chose to play the Nocturne in C♯ minor, after which Hosenfeld protected Szpilman and gave him food to survive.

At the Kraków-Płaszów concentration camp, Nazi commandant Amon Goeth ordered the imprisoned Jewish pianist Natalia Karp to perform for his birthday. She chose Chopin's Nocturne in C♯ minor because it was melancholy enough to describe her feelings. She played so well that Goeth spared her life, and that of her sister.

In 2002, director Roman Polanski dramatized the radio station's final live broadcast in The Pianist, which was based on Szpilman's memoirs; however, he changed the piece that was played to Chopin's Ballade No. 1 in G minor, Op. 23.

== Recordings on historical pianos ==
Pianist	Piano	Label	Recording year
Tomasz Ritter	Paul McNulty after Conrad Graf (c. 1819)	Fryderyk Chopin Institute	2020-2021
Pierre Goy	Christopher Clark after Conrad Graf (1826)	Lyrinx	2005
Peter Katin	Collard & Collard square piano (c. 1836)	Diversions	1996
Susanne von Laun	Broadwood & Sons (1841)	Musicaphon	2007
Luc Devos	Broadwood (c. 1845)	Ricercar	1994
Arthur Schoonderwoerd	Pleyel (1836)	Alpha	2008
Michèle Boegner	Pleyel (1836)	Calliope	1998
Alain Planès	Pleyel (1836)	Harmonia Mundi	2019
Bart van Oort	Pleyel (1842)	Brilliant Classics	1998
Knut Jacques	Pleyel pianino (1834) / Pleyel piano 1843	Paraty	
Justin Taylor	Pleyel pianino (1839)	Alpha	2024
Yuan Sheng	Pleyel (1845)	Piano Classics	2010
Alex Szilasi	Pleyel pianino (1847)	Fryderyk Chopin Institute	2012
Ronald Brautigam	Erard (1842)	VPRO	1991
Janusz Olejniczak	Erard (1849)	Fryderyk Chopin Institute	2007
Dang Thai Son	Erard (1849)	Fryderyk Chopin Institute	2009
Magdalena Lisak	Erard (1849)	Fryderyk Chopin Institute	2011
Daniel Grimwood	Erard (1851)	SFZ Music	2010
Alexei Orlovetsky	Erard (mid. 19th century)	IML	2005
Kikuko Ogura	Erard (1874)	Hamamatsu Museum of Musical Instruments	2010
Vincenzo Maltempo	Steinway (1888)	Piano Classics	2023
