= Ewa Kupiec =

Polish pianist

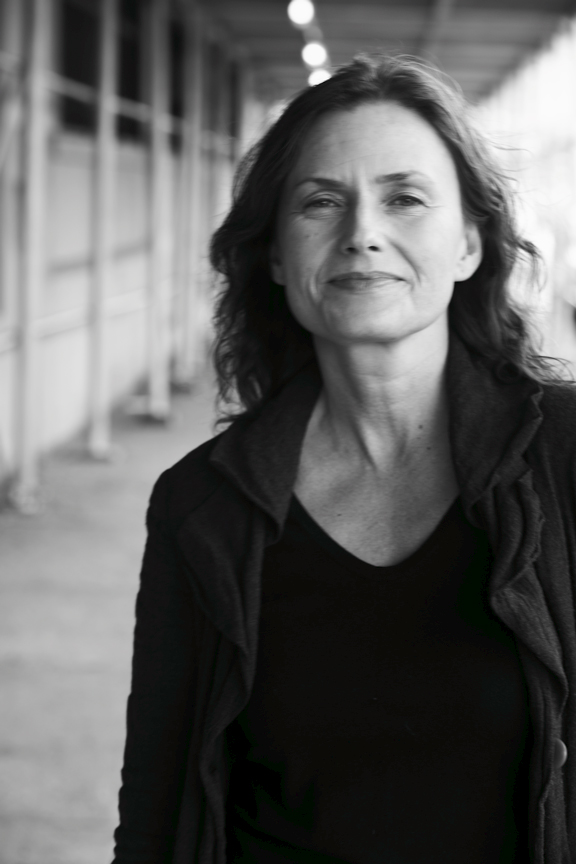
- Ewa Kupiec
- Born: 2 November 1964 (age 62); Duszniki-Zdroj, Poland
- Education: Chopin Academy; Royal Academy of Music
- Occupation: classical pianist

Ewa Kupiec (born 2 November 1964 in Duszniki-Zdrój) is a Polish classical pianist.

In 1992 she won the ARD Music Competition in the piano/cello category. In 2005 she performed Schnittke’s First Piano Concerto with the Berlin Radio Symphony Orchestra at the Berlin Konzerthaus, the first performance of the concerto since 1964. Since 2011 she has been a professor at the Hochschule für Musik, Theater und Medien Hannover.

Kupiec has performed with the Munich Philharmonic, Leipzig Gewandhaus, Orchestre de Paris, Royal Danish Orchestra, Royal Philharmonic Orchestra, Warsaw Philharmonic, Royal Liverpool Philharmonic, City of Birmingham Symphony, Royal Stockholm Philharmonic, Sao Paulo Symphony Orchestra, Minnesota Orchestra and Melbourne Symphony Orchestra.

In July 2018 she was elected as a member of the European Academy of Sciences and Arts.
