= Terence Zuber =

American historian

Terence Zuber is an American military historian specializing in the First World War. He received his doctorate from the University of Würzburg in 2001 after serving for twenty years as an infantry officer in the United States Army. He has advanced the controversial thesis that the Schlieffen Plan as generally understood was a post-World War I fabrication.

He first described his views about the Schlieffen Plan in a 1999 article in War in History, and further developed them in his 2002 book Inventing the Schlieffen Plan. Some scholars, such as Hew Strachan, have largely accepted his ideas, while others including Terence M. Holmes and Holger Herwig have dismissed them.

In a review of Zuber's 2002 book for H-Net, Kelly McFall wrote: "Zuber's argument persuasively demolishes the commonly accepted version of the Schlieffen Plan. But his claim that the Schlieffen Plan itself never existed is more speculative and rests on a reading of evidence that is plausible but not conclusive. Military historians interested in the outbreak of the First World War will need to read this book and decide for themselves. Others will want to follow the debate closely, but may prefer to wait for a consensus to emerge."

Rebuttals to his ideas include:

- Annika Mombauer, "Of War Plans and War Guilt: The Debate Surrounding the Schlieffen Plan," Journal of Strategic Studies, Vol. 28, No. 5 (October 2005), 857-885
- Terence M. Holmes, "The Reluctant March on Paris: A Reply to Terence Zuber's 'The Schlieffen Plan Reconsidered,'" War in History, 8 (2001), 208–232
- Terence M. Holmes, "The Real Thing: A Reply to Terence Zuber's 'Terence Holmes Reinvents the Schlieffen Plan,'" War in History 9/1 (2002), 111–20
- Robert T. Foley, "The Origins of the Schlieffen Plan," War in History 12/3 (2003): 222–32
- Robert T. Foley, "The Real Schlieffen Plan," War in History 13/1 (2006), 366–90
- chapters by Gerhard Gross, Robert Foley, and Annika Mombauer in Hans Ehlert, Michael Epkenhans and Gerhard Gross (eds), Der Schlieffenplan. Analyse und Dokumente (Schoningh: Paderborn, 2006)
- Holger Herwig, "Germany and the Short War Illusion: Toward a New Interpretation?" Journal of Military History, 66 (July 2002), 683.

Perhaps most importantly, in 2006, Germany’s Military History Research Office (MGFA) published Der Schlieffenplan: Analysen und Dokumente, edited by Michael Epkenhans, Hans Ehlert and Gerhard P. Groß (The Schlieffen Plan: Analyzes and documents. Age of World Wars, Volume II ). This volume contains a copy of Schlieffen's 1905 Memorandum misfiled in the German Military Archives at Freiburg and German deployment plans from the year 1893/94 to 1914/15, most of which had been lost otherwise. These documents are said to strongly support the traditional ideas of a "Schlieffen Plan" that Zuber disputed.

== Works ==
- "The Schlieffen Plan Reconsidered," War in History, 6 (1999), pp. 262–305
- Inventing the Schlieffen Plan: German War Planning, 1871–1914. Oxford University Press, 2002.
- "The Schlieffen Plan - Fantasy or Catastrophe?", History Today (2002).
- German War Planning, 1891-1914: Sources and Interpretations. Boydell Press, 2004.
- The Battle of the Frontiers. Ardennes 1914. Tempus, 2007.
- The Moltke Myth. Prussian War Planning 1857–1871 UPA, 2008.
- The Mons Myth. A Reevaluation of the Battle. 2010.
- The Real German War Plan 1904–1914 The History Press Ltd 2011.
- Ten Days in August, The Siege of Liege 1914 The History Press Ltd 2014.
