= Thomas Vogel (historian) =

German historian and author (born 1959)

Thomas Vogel (born 1959) is a German military historian and author. He is lieutenant-colonel in the German Armed Forces and a senior fellow of the Center for Military History and Social Sciences of the Bundeswehr.

== Education and career ==
Vogel submitted his doctoral dissertation on Medieval History in 1994. By 1997, he was a permanent member of the Military History Research Office (MGFA) (since 2013, the Center for Military History and Social Sciences of the Bundeswehr) in Potsdam. As MGFA project manager and co-author, Vogel created three touring exhibitions: Military Resistance against Hitler and the Nazi Regime, History of the Bundeswehr from the Beginning to 2005, and History of the Armed Bundeswehr Missions Abroad. His research covers the collection of letters and diaries of the Wehrmacht army captain Wilm Hosenfeld, who was an eye-witness to the occupation of Poland by Nazi Germany during World War II.

Vogel is an editorial staff member of Militargeschichte. Zeitschrift fur historische Bildung (Military History: Journal of History Education) and Militärgeschichtliche Zeitschrift (Journal of Military History) both published by the Center for Military History and Social Sciences of the Bundeswehr. With a shift in the Institute's Department for Historical Research, Vogel works on military integration and coalitions during both world wars.

== Works ==
- Fehderecht und Fehdepraxis im Spätmittelalter am Beispiel der Reichsstadt Nürnberg (1404–1438) (Freiburger Beiträge zur mittelalterlichen Geschichte. Bd. 11). Lang, Frankfurt am Main u. a. 1998, ISBN 3-631-33100-2.
- (Ed.): Aufstand des Gewissens. Militärischer Widerstand gegen Hitler und das NS-Regime 1933 bis 1945. Begleitband zur Wanderausstellung des Militärgeschichtlichen Forschungsamtes. Im Auftrag des Militärgeschichtlichen Forschungsamtes, 5. Auflage, Mittler, Hamburg u. a. 2000, ISBN 3-8132-0708-0.
- (Ed.): Wilm Hosenfeld: "Ich versuche jeden zu retten". Das Leben eines deutschen Offiziers in Briefen und Tagebüchern. Im Auftrag des Militärgeschichtlichen Forschungsamtes, DTV, München 2004, ISBN 3-421-05776-1.
- With Jörg Echternkamp, Wolfgang Schmidt (Eds.): Perspektiven der Militärgeschichte. Raum, Gewalt und Repräsentation in historischer Forschung und Bildung (Beiträge zur Militärgeschichte. Bd. 67). Im Auftrag des Militärgeschichtlichen Forschungsamtes, Oldenbourg, München 2010, ISBN 978-3-486-58816-3.
- With Markus Pöhlmann, Harald Potempa (Eds.): Der Erste Weltkrieg 1914–1918. Der deutsche Aufmarsch in ein kriegerisches Jahrhundert. Im Auftrag des Militärgeschichtlichen Forschungsamtes, Bucher, München 2014, ISBN 978-3-7658-2033-5.

== Sources ==
- Poulsen, Niels Bo; Galster, Kjeld Hald; Nørby, Søren, eds. (2013). Coalition Warfare: An Anthology of Scholarly Presentations at the Conference on Coalition Warfare at the Royal Danish Defense College, 2011. Cambridge Scholars Publishing.
- ZMSbw (2017). "CV_Publikationen" (PDF).
