= Militärgeschichtliche Zeitschrift =

- Discipline: Military history
- Language: German
- Edited by: Jörg Hillmann; Michael Epkenhans

Publication details
- Former name: Militärgeschichtliche Mitteilungen
- History: 1967–present
- Publisher: Walter de Gruyter on behalf of the Center for Military History and Social Sciences of the Bundeswehr (Germany)
- Frequency: Biannually

Standard abbreviations
- ISO 4: Mil. Z.

Indexing
- ISSN: 2193-2336 (print); 2196-6850 (web)
- OCLC no.: 1082244069

Links
- Journal homepage; Journal page at publisher's website

The Militärgeschichtliche Zeitschrift (English: Military History Journal) is a biannual peer-reviewed academic journal covering military history. It is published by Walter de Gruyter on behalf of the Center for Military History and Social Sciences of the Bundeswehr (formerly Military History Research Office, MGFA]) in Potsdam, Germany.

It is a successor to the Militärgeschichtliche Mitteilungen (MGM) that was published from 1967 to 1998, considered early on to be an "important interface between MGFA, university science and interested public".

The editors-in-chief are Jörg Hillmann and Michael Epkenhans, the commander and chief scientist of the center, respectively.
