= Battle casualties of World War II =

The article summarizes casualties in different theatres of World War II in Europe and North Africa. Only the military losses and civilian losses directly associated with hostilities are included into the article. The actions of the Axis' and Allied military or civilian authorities that fit the definition of genocide, or war crimes (including Nazi war crimes, Soviet war crimes, Allied war crimes, Holocaust, Nazi crimes against Soviet POWs et caetera) are left beyond the scope of the present article.

== Polish Campaign, 1939 ==
Poland deployed 40 Infantry divisions and 16 brigades (including 1 motorized brigade) with 690,000 men. German forces included 69 Infantry and 14 Panzer divisions comprising 1,250,000 men. Polish losses were estimated in 1947 by the Polish government to be 66,300 killed and 133,700 wounded. German casualties based on statistics collected during the war were 10,570 KIA, 30,322 WIA and 3,469 MIA. The 1995 Polish estimate of military dead and missing was 95,000-97,000 and 130,000 wounded in the 1939 campaign, including 17–19,000 killed by the Soviets in the Katyn Massacre A 2000 study by the German Armed Forces Military History Research Office estimated total German military dead at 15,000 in September 1939. The Soviet Union deployed 34 divisions against Poland with 466,516 men and suffered losses of 996 killed and missing, and 2,002 wounded. Polish forces deployed 475 tanks and 313 combat aircraft in the campaign. German forces deployed 2,511 tanks and 1,323 combat aircraft. German losses amounted to 674 tanks and 564 aircraft.

== Russo-Finnish War, 1939–1940 ==
Finland deployed 9 infantry divisions with 327,800 men and 287 combat aircraft. The Soviet Union deployed 54 divisions, with 760,578 men, 3,200 tanks and 2,500 aircraft. Finnish losses amounted to 23,157 KIA, 1,766 MIA, 43,557 WIA and 61 aircraft. Soviet losses were 126,875 dead and missing, 264,908 wounded, 1,600 tanks and 725 planes.

== Denmark and Norway April 1940 ==
The Germans deployed 107,000 men to seize Denmark and Norway and suffered total casualties on land of 5,660, (including 1,317 killed on land and 2,375 at sea. The UK, France and Poland forces totaled 80,000 men and suffered total casualties on land of 4,000. Norway deployed 5 divisions with 90,000 men. and lost 2,000 dead and missing . The Royal Navy lost 1 aircraft carrier, 2 cruisers, 9 destroyers and 6 submarines. Aircraft losses were 110. Germany lost 3 cruisers 10 destroyers and 6 submarines.

== Western Europe May–June 1940 ==
German forces totaled 123 divisions(including 10 Panzer div) with 2,350,000 men, 2,574 tanks and 3,500 planes. Allied forces: total manpower 2,862,000 and 3,609 tanks. France-103 divisions(including 3 armoured divisions); UK-9 divisions with 394,165 men and 1,660 aircraft. Poland 1 division; Belgium- 22 divisions with 600,000 men; The Netherlands 9 divisions with 400,000 men.
German casualties based on statistics collected during the war included 27,074 KIA, 18,384 MIA and 111,034 WIA. Equipment losses were 753 tanks and 1,284 aircraft. UK total casualties were 68,111 including 11,000 KIA. The RAF lost 931 aircraft. French losses were 92,000 KIA, 39,600 MIA and over 250,000 WIA. French aircraft losses were 560. Belgian total casualties were 23,350 including 6,500 KIA. Dutch total casualties were 9,779 including 2,100 KIA. Civilian deaths totaled 13,000 in France 13,000 Belgium and 2,000 in the Netherlands. A 2000 study by the German Armed Forces Military History Research Office estimated total German military dead at 50,000 in May and June 1940.
32 Italian divisions attacked France in the Alps region defended by 6 French divisions. The French repulsed the attack with a loss of 79 killed. Italian losses were 1,247 KIA, 2,631 WIA and 3,878 POW. .

== The Battle of Britain July 1940-May 1941 ==
In the summer of 1940 German air forces opposing the UK totaled 2,830 aircraft including 1,300 Bf 109/Bf 110 fighters and 1,350 Heinkel bombers. The RAF had 650 operational fighters including 120 Spitfires. During the Battle of Britain from July 10, 1940, until October 31, 1940, the UK lost 1,065 aircraft(including 1,004 fighters); Germany lost 1,922 aircraft(including 879 fighters, 80 Stukas and 881 bombers). UK civilian losses in the German Blitz that ended in May 1941 totaled 43,381 killed and 50,856 injured. German Luftwaffe losses from August 1940 until March 1941 were 2,840 aircraft. Casualties of the German aircrew were 3,363 KIA, 2,117 WIA and 2,641 taken prisoner.

== War in the Mediterranean 1940-1942 ==
- Mers-el-Kebir July 1940 A task force of 2 UK battleships,1 aircraft carrier, 2 heavy cruisers and 11 destroyers attacked the French naval base at Mers-el-Kebir. The French lost 3 battleships and 1 destroyer, 1,297 KIA and 351 WIA. UK losses were 2 KIA.
- Taranto November 1940 The Royal Navy, using 21 aircraft, attacked the Italian naval base at Taranto damaging 3 battleships and 2 cruisers.
- Cape Matapan March 1941In the naval engagement off Cape Matapan the Royal Navy destroyed 3 Italian cruisers, 2 destroyers and damaged 1 battleship. The Italians lost 2,400 killed. The UK force lost no ships and suffered minor casualties.
- Siege of Malta June 1940-November 1942The UK lost 369 fighters in the air and 64 on the ground during the siege of Malta. Over 900 German and 600 Italian aircraft were lost in attacks on the island. 1,493 Maltese civilians were killed and 3,764 wounded.

== North Africa 1940-41 ==
- Opposing forces September 1940. Italy deployed 215,000 men and the UK 36,000.
- Sidi Barrani December 1940- Allied forces totaled 31,000 men, 120 guns and 275 tanks: one UK division, one Australian division and two Indian brigades. Italian forces totaled 5 divisions and 100,000 men. The Italian forces were defeated losing 4,400 killed and wounded, 38,000 POW, 73 tanks and 237 guns. Allied losses were only 264 men.
- Bardia January 1941The Italian garrison at Bardia gave up losing 5,400 killed and wounded and 39,949 POW taken. They lost 128 tanks and 400 guns and mortars.
- Tobruk January 1941The Italian garrison at Tobruk gave up losing 3,000 killed and wounded and 25,000 POW taken. They lost 23 tanks and 208 guns.
- Beda From February 1941The Italian garrison at Bedda Fromm gave up losing 112 tanks, 216 guns and 25,000 POW taken.
- War in North Africa Dec.1940 to Feb 1941 A summary. British Commonwealth forces totaling 63,000 men suffered losses of 476 killed, 1,225 wounded and 43 missing. Italian forces were routed losing 10 divisions 20,000 killed and wounded plus 130,000 POW captured.
- Tobruk II April–November 1941- German and Italian forces of 90,000 under the command of Rommel went over to the offensive against 23,000 Allied troops of whom were cut off 15,000 in Tobruk.
- Sollum-Halfaya Pass June 1941-The Allied counteroffensive with two divisions and two brigades was stopped by one German and 2 Italian divisions under Rommel. The Allies lost 960 killed and wounded and 91 tanks and 36 planes. The Axis forces lost 800 men, 12 tanks and 12 planes.
- Operation Crusader November 1941-January 1942- The Allied offensive pushed the Axis forces back and relieved Tobruk. British Commonwealth forces of 7divisions with 118,000 men, 756 tanks and 1,000 planes suffered losses of 2,900 KIA, 7,300 WIA and 7,500 MIA. 278 tanks were also lost. Axis forces of 10 divisions under Rommel lost suffered losses of 2,300 KIA, 6,100 WIA and 29,900 MIA. 340 tanks were also lost.

== Greece 1940-1941 ==
Italian forces invaded Greece in October 1940. By March 1941 Italian forces of 526,550 men and 16 divisions were held back by 14 Greek divisions. German intervention in April 1941 forced the Greeks to surrender. The Italians lost 13,755 KIA, 50,874 WIA, 12,368 MIA and 12,368 disabled by frostbite. The Greeks lost 13,048 KIA and 42,485 WIA. Italian losses from October 1940 to April 1941, including the war in Greece and Yugoslavia totaled 38,830 KIA and 50,870 WIA.
In April 1941 the German 12th Army organized in 10 divisions and 3 regiments with 1,907 tanks invaded Greece. Allied forces opposing the Germans included British Empire forces 56,657 organized in 2 divisions and 1 brigade; and Greek forces of 3 divisions. The Germans rapidly defeated the allies losing 1,423 KIA and 3,411 wounded. British Empire forces lost 3,700 dead and 8,000 taken prisoner. The Greeks lost 70,000 killed and wounded plus 270,000 POW. 50,732 allied troops were evacuated by sea.

== Yugoslavia 1941 ==
German, Italian, Hungarian and Bulgarian of 650,000 men in 33 divisions faced 800,000 Yugoslav forces organized in 28 divisions. German forces suffered 151 KIA and 407 WIA. Italian and Hungarian losses totaled 1,000. 341,000 Yugoslavs were taken prisoner and 3,000 to 17,000 civilians killed in the bombing of Belgrade.

== Eastern Front, 1941–1945 ==
=== Axis and Finland deployments ===
According to Soviet sources, for the invasion of Soviet Union in July, 1941, Germany deployed 4.6 million men in 152 divisions and 2 separate brigades, 42,000 artillery, 4,000 tanks, and 4,000 aircraft. Co-belligerent Finland and Axis powers Hungary, Italy, and Romania deployed an additional 0.9 million men in 29 divisions and 16 brigades, 5,200 artillery, 300 tanks, and 1,000 aircraft. However, David Glantz puts the strength of the German forces and their allies in June 1941 at 3,767,000 At the height of her strength in August, 1943, Germany held 189 divisions on the Eastern Front.

=== Allied deployments ===
Against the invasion, the Soviet Union deployed 2.9 million men in 167 divisions and 9 brigades, 32,900 artillery (not accounting for 50 mm rocket launchers), 14,200 tanks, and 9,200 aircraft. The Czechoslovak military units on Eastern front deployed 60,000 men, 68 artillery, 105 tanks, and 91 aircraft at their maximum in the Prague Offensive. The Polish Anders Army numbered 41,000 troops, the Polish People's Army 200,000, and the Polish resistance movement more than 300,000. In 1944, a number of Germany-allied nations switched on the Soviet side. The Romanian forces deployed 538,536 troops against Germany, Bulgaria 455,000, and Finland 213,000. In the Prague Uprising, 30,000 Czech partisans participated.

=== Axis and Finland military casualties ===
Against the Soviet forces, the German Armed Forces lost 3,604,800 men as killed in action, missing in action, or for non-combat reasons. An additional 3,576,300 were captured by the Soviets, 442,100 of whom died. Finland and the Axis suffered the loss of 668,200 men as killed in action, missing in action against the Soviet forces or for non-combat reasons on the Eastern Front. An additional 800,000 Axis and Finnish soldiers were captured by the Soviets, 137,800 of whom died. The casualties of Axis and Finland at the Eastern Front total at 4,852,900 deaths.

=== Allied military casualties ===
The Soviet Armed Forces suffered 8,700,000 military deaths and missing in action. The number of Czech partisan deaths was 2,170 The Czechoslovak military units on Eastern front lost 4,570 as dead. The Polish resistance movement suffered 100,000 deaths. The number of Bulgarian partisan deaths against the "fascists" was 10,000. 10,124 Bulgarian and 21,035 Romanian deaths were documented with the Allies. 1,036 Finns died in the Lapland War and 8,000 Czech partisans were killed in the Prague Uprising.

The Allied casualties at the Eastern Front total at 8,900,000 deaths.
