= Inner Leadership Center =

Military training facility in Germany

Inner Leadership Center of the German Armed Forces
- Zentrum Innere Führung
- Established: 1956
- Location: Koblenz, Germany
- Coordinates: 50°20′17″N 7°37′8.5″E
- Type: Military cross career training facility

The Inner Leadership Center of the German Armed Forces (German: Zentrum Innere Führung, abbreviated as ZInFü), in English officially referred to as the Center of leadership development and civic education, or unofficially and occasionally as Moral and Welfare Center is a military installation of the Bundeswehr for cross-career training of civilian and military personnel as well as for research dealing with any matters concerning "leadership development and civic education" (official translation), namely leadership culture and self image of the German Bundeswehr.

== Tasks ==
The Inner Leadership Center defines itself as a training facility for Organizational culture, leadership philosophy and military self-understanding. This leadership culture implies norms and values of the German Basic Law to be embedded in the new German armed forces following World War II.

As a nationally recognized training facility with an international network, it has a leading responsibility for development, shaping and teaching German military leadership culture. At the same time, the Inner Leadership Center is the focal training facility for developing individual leadership competence.

Under direct command of the Inspector General of the Bundeswehr (GenInspBw), it facilitates the continuous development of the Concept of Leadership and Leadership Culture of the Bundeswehr and serves as the according representative. In its location in Koblenz, military and to a lesser extent civil leaders receive a mission based training within the fields of Leadership, Political Education, Law and Military Discipline. This is supplemented by outbound coaching activities on a voluntary basis.

Moreover, the Inner Leadership Center is the Central training Installation for the legal branch of the Bundeswehr, providing legal training for legal advisiors and military personnel alike. Also, it covers social or otherwise internal issues of the German Armed Forces and issues dealing with security politics.

The aforementioned activities are communicated in a variety of media.

== Organisation ==
The Inner Leadership Center is led by a commander with the rank of a Major General, whereas the Inspector General's Commissioner for education and training has a double headed role as Deputy commander.

The Bundeswehr Military History Museum and the Center for Military History and Social Sciences of the Bundeswehr are separate offices under the command of the Inner Leadership Center. Apart from that, it also has a branch office in Strausberg.

== History ==
The Inner Leadership Center was founded in 1956 as the School of the Bundeswehr for Inner Leadership (InFüSBw) in Köln, initially using hotel facilities and subsequently transferred to Koblenz in 1957, taking over a former French Armed Forces Hotel. Since 1981, the installation bears the name Zentrum Innere Führung. The Inner Leadership Center is unter direct command of the Federal Ministry of Defence (Germany) (BMVg) since 1 August 2017.

== Awards ==
- 1992: Fahnenband of the state of Rheinland-Pfalz
- 2006: Wolf-Graf-von-Baudissin-Medal

== Literature ==
- Georg Meyer: On the internal development of the Bundeswehr until 1960/61 (Translation of the German title). in: Hans Ehlert: Beginnings of West German security policy. 1945–1956 (Translation of the German title). Volume 3: Die NATO-Option. publication by Military Research Office, Oldenburg, Munich 1993, ISBN 3-486-51691-4, p. 851 ff.
- Zentrum Innere Führung (editor): Commemorative document on occasion of the 30th anniversary of the School of Innere Führung, Center of Leadership Culture, 1956–1986 (Translation of the German title). Preface by Adalbert von der Recke, Koblenz 1986.
- Hans-Joachim Reeb, Peter Többicke: Lexikon Innere Führung. 4. Edition, Walhalla, Regensburg etc. 2014, ISBN 978-3-8029-6257-8, p. 292 ff.
- Wolf Graf von Baudissin: Soldier for peace: Designs for a contemporary Bundeswehr(Translation of the German title). München: Piper, 1970.
- Jens O. Koltermann: Citizen in Uniform: Democratic Germany and the Changing Bundeswehr, 2012
