= Villa Ingenheim =

Historic building in Potsdam, Germany

Coordinates: 52°23′10″N 13°01′32″E

The Villa Ingenheim is a historic building in the suburbs west of Brandenburg Potsdam. Located at Zeppelinstraße 127/128, the property was used by the German Armed Forces Military History Research Office (since 2013, the Center for Military History and Social Sciences of the Bundeswehr).

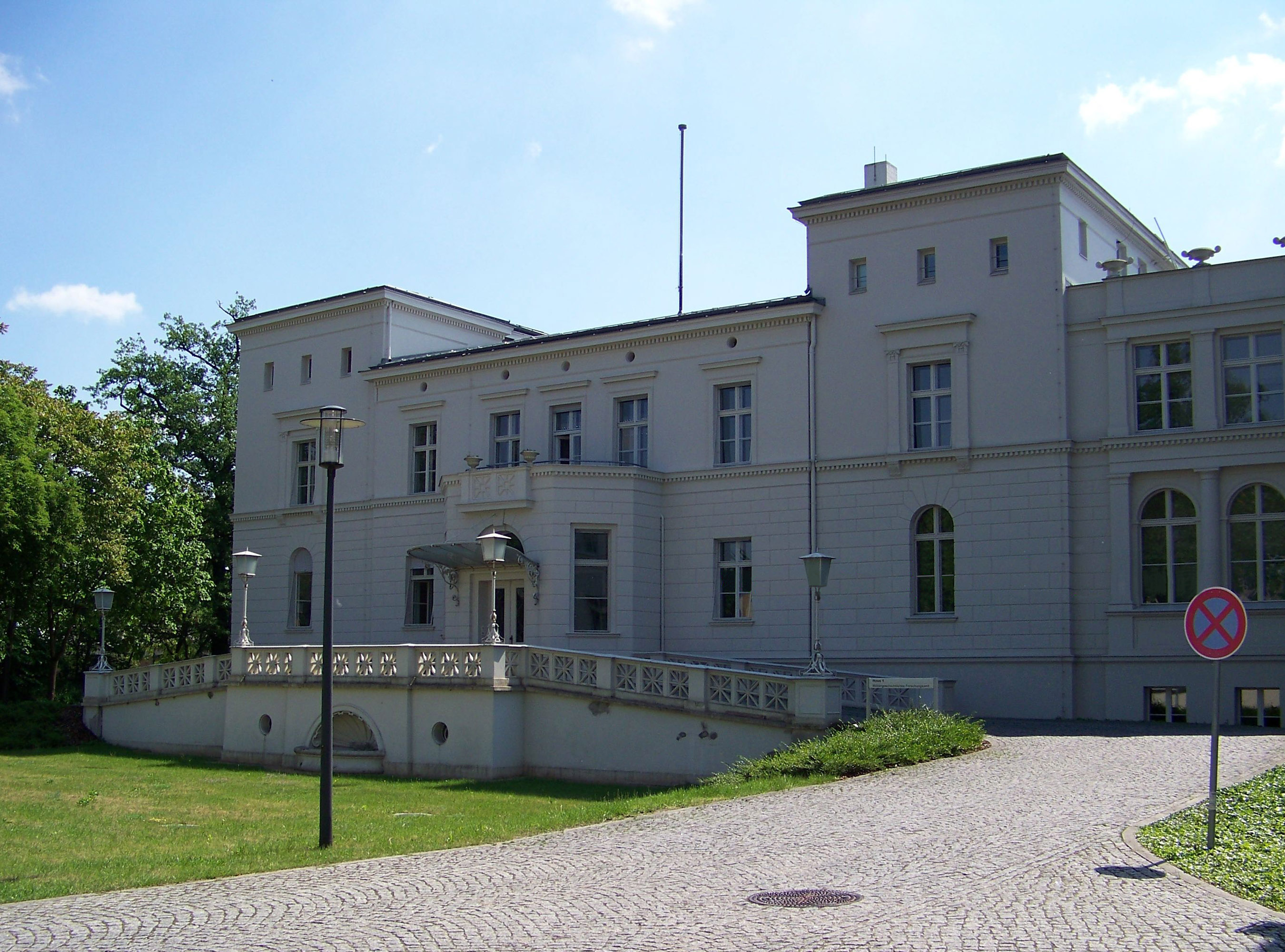
Villa Ingenheim
