= War in History =

- Discipline: Military Sciences
- Language: English
- Edited by: Simon Ball, Mary Kathryn Barbier, and Phillips O'Brien

Publication details
- History: 1994–present
- Publisher: SAGE Publications
- Frequency: Quarterly
- Impact factor: 0.237 (2013)

Standard abbreviations
- ISO 4: War Hist.

Indexing
- ISSN: 0968-3445 (print); 1477-0385 (web)
- LCCN: sn95030217
- OCLC no.: 42423837

Links
- Journal homepage; Online access; Online archive

War In History is a peer-reviewed academic journal that publishes papers in the field of History. The journal's editors are Simon Ball (University of Leeds), Mary Kathryn Barbier (Mississippi State University), Phillips O'Brien (University of Glasgow) and formerly the late Dennis Showalter (Colorado College). It has been in publication since 1994 and is published by SAGE Publications.

== Scope ==
War in History takes the view that military history should be integrated into a broader definition of history. It is a journal that publishes articles on aspects of war such as economic, social, political and military with no set restriction regarding period. Articles include the study of naval forces, maritime power and air forces. It is published quarterly and is edited by Simon Ball (University of Leeds), Mary Kathryn Barbier (Mississippi State University), and Phillips O'Brien (University of Glasgow).

== Abstracting and indexing ==
War in History is abstracted and indexed in, among other databases, SCOPUS and the Social Sciences Citation Index. According to the Journal Citation Reports, its 2013 impact factor is 0.237, ranking it 33rd out of the 72 journals in the 'History' category and 70th out of the 82 titles in the 'International Relations' category.
