= Phillips O'Brien =

American historian (born 1963)

- Born: 1963 (age 62–63); Boston, Massachusetts, U.S.

Academic background
- Education: Trinity College, Connecticut; Pembroke College, Cambridge (PhD)

Academic work
- Discipline: Historian
- Sub-discipline: War studies
- Institutions: University of Glasgow; University of St Andrews
- Notable works: How the War Was Won: Air-Sea Power and Allied Victory in World War II (2015); The Second Most Powerful Man in the World: The Life of Admiral William D. Leahy, Roosevelt's Chief of Staff (2019)

Phillips Payson O'Brien (born 1963) is an American historian and professor of strategic studies at the University of St Andrews, Scotland. He was formerly at the University of Glasgow where he ran the Scottish Centre for War Studies.

His books include the revisionist history How the War Was Won: Air-Sea Power and Allied Victory in World War II (2015) which concluded that superiority in the air and on the sea on an "Air-Sea Super Battlefield" of thousands of miles, rather than battles on land, determined the outcome of the war. He is also the author of The Second Most Powerful Man in the World: The Life of Admiral William D. Leahy, Roosevelt's Chief of Staff (2019) which re-evaluated the life of Leahy and argued that he was far more influential than had previously been recognised.

== Early life and education ==
Phillips O'Brien was born in 1963 and brought up in Boston, Massachusetts. He is a graduate of Trinity College, Connecticut, and subsequently worked on Wall Street for two years.

== Academic career ==
O'Brien was a Mellon Research Fellow in American history, and a Drapers Research Fellow at Pembroke College, University of Cambridge, where he completed his PhD in British and American politics and naval policy. He credits fellow American-born British-resident historian Zara Steiner with being a major influence on his work. His dissertation was published by Praeger in 1998 as British and American Naval Power: Politics and Policy, 1900-1936.

He was subsequently lecturer in modern history at the University of Glasgow where he also ran the Scottish Centre for War Studies. There, he edited and contributed to Technology and Naval Combat in the Twentieth Century and Beyond (2001), which focussed on technical changes in making naval policy, and The Anglo-Japanese Alliance, 1902-1922 (2004) which was based on papers given at the Anglo-Japanese Alliance 1902 Centenary Conference in 2002. In 2012, he gave evidence to the Scottish Affairs Select Committee of the British House of Commons on the future siting of British nuclear weapons in the event of Scotland leaving the United Kingdom.

In 2016, O'Brien moved to the University of St Andrews, where he is professor of strategic studies.

== Major books ==
Cover of How the War Was Won, Air-Sea Power and Allied Victory in World War II, 2015.

In 2015, O'Brien published How the War Was Won: Air-Sea Power and Allied Victory in World War II (2015), which was described by Talbot C. Imlay in The Journal of Modern History as "provocative" and "revisionist history at its best". After an analysis of the proportion of military output devoted to the different arenas of combat, O'Brien concluded that victory in World War Two was determined not through battles on land, but in the air and at sea on what he calls an "Air-Sea Super Battlefield" that crossed thousands of miles. O'Brien argues that securing dominance in this battlefield enabled the Allies to degrade the ability of the Axis powers to wage war by destroying their ability to manufacture equipment or by destroying it in transit to the battlefield before it could be put into use. The degrading of Axis aircraft production also had the effect of denying air-support to Axis land forces, leading to more defeats for them on the ground.

Nicholas Murray in Naval War College Review saw the book as more of a "revision of the revisionists", as the weight to be given to land warfare in the history of World War Two had been a subject of debate for some time. Murray appreciated the detailed analysis that O'Brien had carried out, which supported his conclusions that great damage was done to Axis capabilities, but nonetheless didn't feel that the author had proved that it was that damage that determined the outcome of the war. Murray felt that the author's belief that "the only way to 'win' a war is to stop your enemy from moving" was particularly pertinent to U.S. military planners contemplating a war with China or Russia in areas such as South East Asia or the Baltic or Black Sea.

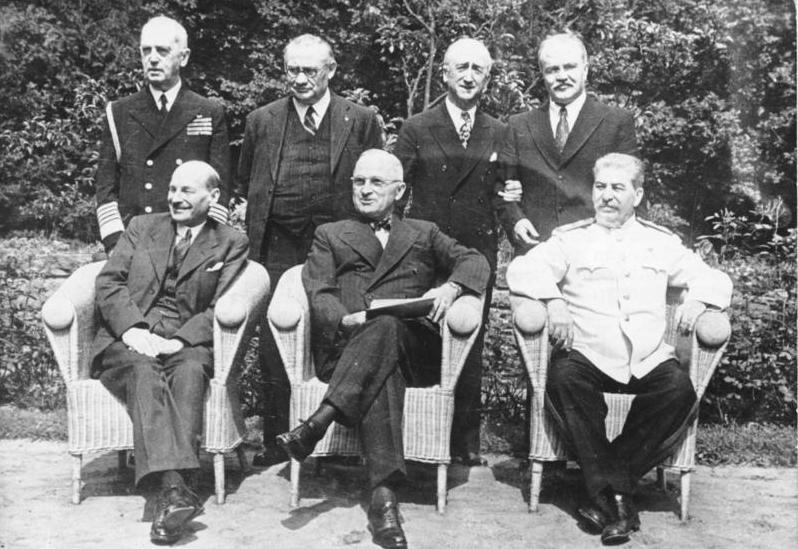
William D. Leahy (back left) with front from left: Clement Attlee, Harry S. Truman, Joseph Stalin; and back: Leahy, Ernest Bevin, James F. Byrnes and Vyacheslav Molotov.

In 2019, O'Brien published The Second Most Powerful Man in the World: The Life of Admiral William D. Leahy, Roosevelt's Chief of Staff, in which he discussed Leahy's influence on major U.S. decisions during the Second World War through the lens of his relationship with U.S. president Franklin D. Roosevelt. Examples included the decision to give equal or even higher priority to the fight against Japan rather than Germany, and Leahy's opposition to a 1943 Allied invasion of Europe. The book then goes on to discuss the more difficult relationship between Leahy and president Harry S. Truman in the post-war era in the context of Leahy's non-interventionist inclinations.

Craig L. Symonds in Historynet.com noted that O'Brien credited Leahy with far more influence than Henry H. Adams had in his 1985 biography of Leahy, Witness to Power, but was forced to rely too much on circumstantial evidence due to a lack of primary sources for Leahy's role. Matthew Wayman in Library Journal described the book as an excellent biography of a significant but neglected figure in World War II history, but noted the lack of any significant criticism of the subject. Steve Donoghue in The Christian Science Monitor, welcomed the book as an overdue first-rate telling of the life of a man who had more authority than celebrity and who was the "quiet commander in the background of every photo" of Roosevelt.

== Selected publications ==
=== Journal Articles ===
- "The Titan Refreshed: Imperial Overstretch and the British Navy before the First World War", Past & Present, No. 172 (August 2001), pp. 146-169.
- "The American press, public, and the reaction to the outbreak of the First World War", Diplomatic History, Vol. 37, No. 3 (June 2013), pp. 446–475.

=== Books ===
- British and American Naval Power: Politics and Policy, 1900-1936. Westport: Praeger. 1998. ISBN 978-0-275-95898-5. OCLC 1080902457. (Praeger Studies in Diplomacy and Strategic Thought)
- Technology and Naval Combat in the Twentieth Century and Beyond. London: Frank Cass. 2001. ISBN 9780415449366 (Naval Policy and History No. 13) (Editor and contributor)
- The Anglo-Japanese Alliance, 1902-1922. London & New York: Routledge Curzon. 2004. ISBN 0415326117 (Routledge Studies in the Modern History of Asia No. 17) (Editor and contributor)
- How the War Was Won: Air-Sea Power and Allied Victory in World War II. Cambridge: Cambridge University Press. 2015. ISBN 978-1-108-71689-5. OCLC 1089931799. (Cambridge Military Histories)
- The Second Most Powerful Man in the World: The Life of Admiral William D. Leahy, Roosevelt's Chief of Staff. New York: Dutton. 2019. ISBN 9780399584800. OCLC 1048947225.
- The Strategists: Churchill, Stalin, Roosevelt, Mussolini, and Hitler - How War Made Them and How They Made War. New York: Dutton. 2024. ISBN 978-1524746483. OCLC 1453399547.
- War and Power: Who wins wars - and why. Hachette. 2025. ISBN 978-1541606975.

=== Non-Academic Articles ===
- "Phillips Payson O’Brien, The Atlantic." The Atlantic. https://www.theatlantic.com/author/phillips-payson-obrien/.
- "Author: Phillips O’Brien." The Critic Magazine. https://thecritic.co.uk/author/phillips-obrien/.
- Phillips’s Newsletter. https://phillipspobrien.substack.com/.
