= Michael Epkenhans =

German military historian

Michael Epkenhans (b. 1955 at Wiedenbrück, Germany) is a German military historian known for his works dealing with the German Imperial Navy. He was the director of the Otto-von-Bismarck-Stiftung in Friedrichsruh from 1996 to 2009. In February 2009 he became the director of research for the Militärgeschichtliches Forschungsamt der Bundeswehr in Potsdam. Following a reorganisation in 2013, the organisation became the Center for Military History and Social Sciences of the Bundeswehr.

== Publications ==
- Co-Editor with Jörg Hillmann and Frank Nägler: Skagerrakschlacht. Vorgeschichte - Ereignis - Verarbeitung, Beiträge zur Militärgeschichte, Band 66; Militärgeschichtliches Forschungsamt, Potsdam; R. OLdenbourg Verlag, München, 2., überarbeitete Auflage 2010 ISBN 978-3-486-70270-5
- Tirpitz: Architect of the German High Seas Fleet, Potomac Books, Washington, DC 2008 ISBN 978-1-57488-732-7
- Die wilhelminische Flottenrüstung 1908 - 1914: Weltmachtstreben, industrieller Fortschritt, soziale Integration, R. Oldenbourg Verlag, Munich 1991 ISBN 3-486-55880-3
