= Bundeswehr Centre of Military History and Social Sciences =

German research institution

The Bundeswehr Centre of Military History and Social Sciences (Zentrum für Militärgeschichte und Sozialwissenschaften der Bundeswehr, abbreviated as ZMSBw) is a German research institution focused on military history and social sciences. Located in Potsdam, it is a part of Germany's Federal Ministry of Defence. The organisation was formed in 2013 by merging the Military History Research Office (MGFA) and the Bundeswehr Institute of Social Sciences and is subordinate to the Center of Leadership Culture.

== Background and personnel ==
The organisation was formed from several research facilities of Germany. The Military History Research Office (MGFA) was formed in 1958 in West Germany and was based in Freiburg. The Military History Institute of the GDR was formed in Potsdam, East Germany in 1958. In 1994, the two institutions were combined. At the end of 2012, the MGFA was combined with the Bundeswehr Institute of Social Sciences. The new centre is located at Villa Ingenheim in Potsdam, a historic building, which also houses military archives of East Germany's National People's Army.

The centre employs 60 historians, political scientists, and sociologists, supported by 70 other employees. Some employees are in active military service and some are civilians. The commander of the centre is Colonel Dr. Sven Lange and its chief scientist is historian Alaric Searle. The Centre's stated purpose is to "conduct fundamental research on military history as well as military-sociological and security-policy research for the Bundeswehr". The centre Publishers Militärgeschichtliche Zeitschrift (MGZ) and Militärgeschichte. Zeitschrift für historische Bildung..

== Selected researchers ==
The centre's researchers include the following historians:

- Harald Potempa
- Thomas Vogel
- John Zimmermann (historian)

== See also ==
- Bundeswehr Museum of Military History
