= Military History Research Office (Germany) =

Institution in the German Bundeswehr

Coat of arms of the MGFA

The Military History Research Office (German: Militärgeschichtliches Forschungsamt, MGFA) was an office of the Bundeswehr located at Potsdam, Germany.

Following a reorganisation in 2013, MGFA was consolidated with the German Army Social Sciences Studies Center to become the Center for Military History and Social Sciences of the Bundeswehr. Also, it has been placed under the command of the Center of Leadership Culture of the Bundeswehr.

== Mission ==
The Military History Research Institute was the central federal institution in Germany for all questions about German military history. Its mission included empirical, archive-based research in accordance with the accepted rules and standards of general historiography. It was a member of the network of historical research institutions of the Federal Republic of Germany outside universities. The institute fostered the cooperation with a large number of research institutes in Germany and abroad and contributed to topical debates among experts in military history.

== Museums ==
Three military history museums are under the administrative and technical command of the MGFA. These are the Militärhistorische Museum der Bundeswehr in Dresden which is in command of the Luftwaffenmuseum der Bundeswehr at the former RAF Gatow in Berlin, and the Königstein Fortress.

== Timeline ==
- 1956: Directive to establish the Military History Research Agency on 1 January 1957.
- 1957: The Military History Research Agency is established in Langenau near Ulm. Colonel Dr. Hans Meier-Welcker, the head of the Military Research Branch in the Federal Ministry of Defense, is also appointed Director of the Research Agency.
- 1958: The History Research Agency renamed 'Military History Research Institute' (MGFA). Colonel Dr. Hans Meier-Welcker appointed Director of the MGFA. The institute was relocated to Freiburg im Breisgau
- 1964: Colonel Dr. Wolfgang von Groote is appointed Director of the MGFA.
- 1976: The first issues of the periodical Militärgeschichtliche Mitteilungen (MGM) were published.
- 1968: Professor Andreas Hillgruber appointed the first Chief Historian of the MGFA.
- 1969: The Historic Museum in Rastatt renamed 'Wehrgeschichtliches Museum der Bundeswehr' and came under the control of the MGFA. Colonel Dr. Herbert Schottelius appointed Director of the MGFA.
- 1970: Dr. Rainer Wohlfeil is appointed Chief Historian of the MGFA. In the same year he is succeeded by Dr. Manfred Messerschmidt.
- 1972: Navy Captain Dr. Friedrich Forstmeier is appointed Director of the MGFA.
- 1975: Militärgeschichtliche Mitteilungen is for the first time supplemented by the international bibliography War and Society Newsletter.
- 1976: Colonel Dr. Othmar Hackl appointed Director of the MGFA.
- 1979: The first volume of the series Germany and the Second World War is published in German under the heading Reasons and Preconditions of German War Politics. This is the 150th publication of the Institute.
- 1984: Opening of the traveling exhibition 'Rebellion of Conscience' in the Federal Diet.
- 1985: Colonel Dr. Günter Roth appointed Director of the MGFA.
- 1989: Wilhelm Deist appointed Chief Historian of the MGFA.
- 1990: Visit of the director of the Soviet Military History Institute, Senior General Professor Dmitri Volkogonov. Visit of the former Commander-in-Chief of the Warsaw Pact Forces, Marshal of the Soviet Union, Viktor Kulikov. The former Military History Institute (MGI) and the former Army Museum of the German Democratic Republic (GDR) are integrated into the technical chain of command of the MGFA, and the latter becomes the Military History Museum of the Bundeswehr.
- 1991: The periodical Militärgeschichtliche Beihefte is for the first time published under the new name Militärgeschichte (Military History). First official visit of an MGFA delegation to the Military History Institute of the Polish Armed Forces in Warsaw.
- 1992: The Chairman of the Joint Chiefs of Staff of the Bundeswehr, General Klaus Naumann, visits the MGFA and announces the relocation of the institute to Potsdam.
- 1994: Prof. Hans-Erich Volkmann succeeded Dr Deist and is appointed Director of Research. The Federal Minister of Defense, Dr Volker Rühe, introduces and presents the MGFA in ´Potsdam. The official residence of the MGFA is the 'Villa Ingenheim' in Zeppelinstrasse.
- 1995: The MGFA library is opened to the public. Navy Captain Dr. Werner Rahn is appointed Director of the MGFA.
- 1996: The Federal Minister of Defense, Dr. Volker Rühe, and the Vice-President of the Potsdam University, Professor Bärbel Kirsch, establish a chair for military history. Appointed to this chair is Professor Bernhard R. Kroener. Professor Daniel Proektor presents the Russian edition of the book World War II. Analyses, Characteristic Features, Research Results in the embassy of the Federal Republic of Germany in Moscow.
- 1997: Visit of the MGFA director, Navy Captain Dr. Werner Rahn, and of Dr. Bruno Thoss in Beijing. Colonel Friedhelm Klein is appointed Director of the MGFA.
- 1998: Opening of the exhibition 'Rebellion of Conscience' in St. Paul's Cathedral in Frankfurt am Main. Handover of the keys of the restored Villa Ingenheim. Working visit of the MGFA director, Colonel Friedhelm Klein, in Beijing, China.
- 1999: Dr. Klaus von Dohnanyi presented the conference paper compilation under the heading 'The Wehrmacht. Myth and Reality'. Working visit of the head of the Research Division, Professor Hans-Erich Volkmann, in the German Historic Institute (DHI) in Warsaw, Poland.
- 2001: Navy Captain Dr. Jörg Duppler, is appointed Director of the MGFA.
- 2003: Prof. Beatrice Heuser, formerly Professor of International and Strategic Studies at the Department of War Studies, King's College London, was appointed Director of Research.
- 2004: Oberst Hans Ehlert was appointed Director of the MGFA

== Reorganisation ==
Effective as of January 2013, MGFA was reorganized and consolidated with the German Army Social Sciences Studies Center (Sozialwissenschaftliches Institut der Bundeswehr to become the Center for Military History and Social Sciences of the German Army (Zentrum für Militärgeschichte und Sozialwissenschaften der Bundeswehr, ZMS-Bw) in Potsdam. As of 26 November 2013, the web addresses www.mgfa.de and zmsbw.de direct to the same site.
