= Goldstein (surname) =

Goldstein (/ˈɡoʊldstaɪn/; Yiddish: [ˈgɔld.ʃteɪ̯n] (Yiddish: גאָלדשטיין, Hebrew: גולדשטיין)) is a surname of German and Yiddish origin, that is widespread among Ashkenazi Jews. It translates to "gold stone" in English. Notable people with the surname include:

== Arts ==
- Adam Goldstein (1973–2009), American musician and disc jockey known as DJ AM
- Alisa M. Goldstein, American genetic epidemiologist
- Boris Goldstein (1922–1987), Soviet violinist
- Brett Goldstein (born 1980), British actor and comedian
- Chaim Itsl Goldstein (born 1900), Polish author
- Doug Goldstein (born 1971), American TV screenwriter, producer and director
- Elliot Goldstein (born 1938), American actor known as Elliott Gould
- Fanny Goldstein (1895–1961), American librarian
- Harvey Goldstein (born 1944), American bass guitarist known as Harvey Brooks
- Jack Goldstein, (1945–2003), Canadian-American performance and conceptual artist
- Jack Goldstein (born 1986), vocalist for the British band Fixers
- Jean-Isidore Goldstein (1925–2007), Romanian-French poet known as Isidore Isou
- Jenette Goldstein (born 1960), American actress
- Jerry Goldstein (born 1940), American producer
- Jess Goldstein, American costume designer
- Johnny Goldstein (born 1991), Israeli musician
- Jonathan Goldstein, British solicitor and entrepreneur
- Jonathan Goldstein (1968–2019), British composer
- Jonathan Goldstein (born 1964), American actor
- Jonathan Goldstein (born 1969), American author
- Jonathan Goldstein (born 1968), American filmmaker
- Lisa Goldstein (born 1953), American fantasy and science fiction writer
- Lisa Goldstein (born 1981), American actress
- Martha Goldstein (1919–2014), American harpsichordist and pianist
- Marvin Goldstein (born 1950), American pianist
- Mikhail Goldstein (1917–1989), composer and violinist
- Philip Goldstein (1913–1980), American painter known as Philip Guston
- Robert Goldstein (1903 - 1974), film producer
- Róza Goldstein (1832–1892), Hungarian mezzo-soprano known as Róza Csillag
- Shaike Goldstein-Ophir (1928–1987), Israeli actor, comedian and screenwriter known as Shaike Ophir
- Sheldon Goldstein (born 1947), American theoretical physicist
- Sokher Goldstein (1859–1887), Romanian singer and actor
- Sophie Goldstein (1861–1904), Romanian actress known as Sophia Karp

== Religion ==
- Clifford Goldstein (born 1955), Seventh-day Adventist author and editor
- Herbert S. Goldstein (1890–1970), American Orthodox rabbi
- Isabella Goldstein (1849–1916), Australian suffragist and social reformer
- Jonathan A. Goldstein (1929–2004), American biblical scholar
- Josef Goldstein (1836–1899), Austro-Hungarian cantor
- Joseph Goldstein (born 1944), American writer and teacher
- Lisa Goldstein (born 1965), American rabbi
- Nachman Goldstein (1825–1894), (aka Tcheriner Rav), Ukrainian rabbi
- Samuel Goldstein (1852–1935), New Zealand rabbi
- Warren Goldstein (born 1971), Chief Rabbi of South Africa

== Sport ==
- Abe Goldstein (1898–1977), American bantamweight boxer
- Danielle Goldstein (born 1985), American-Israeli show jumper
- Don Goldstein (1937-2022), American basketball player
- Freddie Goldstein or Freddie Lish (born 1988), Thai-American basketball player
- Jørn Goldstein (born 1953), Norwegian Olympic ice hockey goalie
- Leah Goldstein (born 1969), Canadian-born Israeli professional road racing cyclist, former World Bantamweight Kickboxing Champion, and Israel's Duathlon champion
- Leo Goldstein, American-Israeli soccer referee
- Lonnie Goldstein (1918–2013), American baseball player
- Margie Goldstein-Engle (born 1958), American equestrian
- Omer Goldstein (born 1996), Israeli cyclist
- Paul Goldstein (born 1976), American tennis player
- Ralph Goldstein (fencer) (1913–1997), American Olympic épée fencer
- Roy Goldstein (born 1993), Israeli cyclist
- Ruby Goldstein (1907–1984), American welterweight boxer
- Samuel Goldstein (1945–1977), American Paralympian
- Shulamit Goldstein (born 1968), Israeli Olympic rhythmic gymnast
- Steven Goldstein (born 1981), Colombian racing driver
- Todd Goldstein (born 1988), Australian rules footballer

== Other ==
- Abraham Samuel Goldstein (1925–2005), Dean of Yale Law School
- Adam Goldstein (born 1988), American author and tech entrepreneur
- Al Goldstein (1936–2013), American pornographer
- Allen A. Goldstein (1925–2022), American mathematician and astrophysicist
- Andy Goldstein (born 1973), British broadcaster
- Arnold P. Goldstein (1933–2002), American psychologist
- Baruch Goldstein (1956–1994), Israeli terrorist
- Bernard R. Goldstein (born 1938), historian of science
- Bruce Goldstein (born 1951), American film programmer, producer, archivist, historian
- Chris Goldstein, American radio personality
- Daniel Goldstein (born 1969), American psychologist
- Ellie Goldstein (born 2001), British model
- Emmanuel Goldstein (born 1959), pen name of Eric Gordon Corley, American hacker
- Eugen Goldstein (1850–1930), German physicist, and an early researcher in X-rays
- Harvey Goldstein (1939–2020), British statistician
- Herbert Goldstein (1922–2005), American physicist
- Herman Goldstein (1931–2020), American criminologist
- Ivo Goldstein (born 1958), Croatian historian
- Jacob Goldstein (1891–1920), American lawyer and politician
- Jay Goldstein, American kidnapper
- Jerry Goldstein (born 1970), American space physicist
- Jonathan L. Goldstein (born 1941), American lawyer
- Joseph I. Goldstein (1939–2015), American engineer
- Joseph L. Goldstein (born 1940), American Nobel Prize–winning biochemist
- Joshua S. Goldstein (born 1952), American scientist
- Joyce Goldstein (born 1935), American chef
- Kurt Goldstein (1878–1965), German neurologist and psychiatrist
- Lee Goldstein, American politician
- Leon M. Goldstein (died 1999), American President of Kingsborough Community College, and acting Chancellor of the City University of New York
- Louis L. Goldstein (1913–1998), American politician
- Marcus Goldstein (1906–1997), American anthropologist
- Martin Goldstein (1905–1941), American gangster
- Matthew Goldstein (born 1941), Chancellor of the City University of New York
- Max Goldstein (1898–1924), Romanian communist
- Max A. Goldstein (1870–1941), American otolaryngologist
- Mel Goldstein (1945–2012), American meteorologist
- Melvyn Goldstein (born 1938), American social anthropologist
- Naomi E. Goldstein, clinical psychologist
- Paul Goldstein (born 1943), American law professor
- Peter Goldstein, British businessman
- Phil Goldstein (1950–2022), American magician known as Max Maven
- Phillip Goldstein (born 1945), American investor
- Rebecca Goldstein (born 1950), American novelist and professor of philosophy
- Reuben Goldstein (1862–1943), British businessman and manufacturer known as Reuben Goldstein Edwards
- Richard Goldstein (1927-2024), American astronomer
- Robin Goldstein (born 1976), American author and wine critic
- Sam Goldstein, Canadian politician
- Slavko Goldstein (1928–2017), Croatian historian
- Solomon Goldstein (1884–1968), Bulgarian Communist politician
- Solomon Goldstein-Rose (born 1993), American politician
- Steve Goldstein (born 1952), American diplomat
- Steve Goldstein, American sportscaster
- Steven Goldstein (born 1962), American activist
- Steven R. Goldstein, American gynecologist
- Sydney Goldstein (1903–1989), British mathematician and aerodynamicist
- Tom Goldstein (born 1970), American attorney
- Vida Goldstein (1869–1949), Australian suffragette and social reformer
- Warren Goldstein, American professor of U.S. history
- Yisroel Goldstein, American shooting survivor
- Yoine Goldstein (1934–2020), Canadian lawyer and politician

== Variant surnames ==
- Aleksandar Goldštajn (1912–2010), prominent Croatian university professor, law scholar and constitutional court judge
- Israel Goldstine (1898–1953), New Zealand politician, businessman, barrister and solicitor

== Fictional ==
- Anthony Goldstein, a minor character in the Harry Potter book series
- Emmanuel Goldstein, a key character in George Orwell's novel Nineteen Eighty-Four
- Ira Goldstein, a character who appears in ASB Bank's commercials
- Koko Goldstein, a character in the Web video series Yacht Rock
- Rachel Goldstein in Water Rats
- Porpentina and Queenie Goldstein, sisters in Fantastic Beasts and Where to Find Them (film)
- Seth Goldstein, a character in the Harold & Kumar film trilogy played by David Krumholtz
- Ivan Goldstein in Missions (TV series)
- Nicoletta "Nico" Goldstein, a supporting character in the video game series Devil May Cry

== See also ==
- Goldstone (disambiguation)
- Goldstine
