= Goldstone (surname) =

Goldstone is an English surname. It is often an anglicized form of the German Jewish surname Goldstein. Notable people with the surname include:

- Anthony Goldstone (1944–2017), English pianist
- Basil Goldstone (1909–1988), British Liberal Party activist
- Blanche Goldstone (1914–2002), American actress, stage name Tracey Roberts
- Bruce Goldstone, American children's book author and illustrator
- Carvin Goldstone (born 1984), South African comedian
- Camille Goldstone-Henry, Australian businesswoman and wildlife scientist
- Sir Frank Walter Goldstone (1870–1955), British teacher, trade unionist and politician
- Gary Goldstone (born 1976), South African football defender
- Henry Goldstone (before 1498–1547), English politician
- Jack Goldstone (born 1953), American political scientist and sociologist
- Jackson Goldstone (born 2004), Canadian cyclist
- James Goldstone, (1931–1999), American director
- Jeffrey Goldstone (1933–2026), British-American theoretical physicist
- Jules Goldstone (1900–1980), American entertainment attorney
- Lawrence A. Goldstone (1903–1998), American mystery writer, pen name Lawrence Treat
- Michael Goldstone, American music industry executive
- Peter Goldstone (1926–2013), British solicitor and judge
- Phil Goldstone (1893–1963), Polish-born American film producer and director
- Richard Goldstone (born 1938), South African judge and international war crimes prosecutor
- Rob Goldstone (born 1960), British publicist, music manager, and former tabloid journalist
- Robert Goldstone, American professor of psychology
- Steven Goldstone (born 1946), American manager of investment firm

== See also ==
- Goldston (disambiguation)
- Gouldstone
