= B. Goldstein =

B. Goldstein may refer to:

- Baruch Goldstein (1956–1994), Israeli physician and mass murderer
- Bernard R. Goldstein, historian of science
- Boris Goldstein (1922–1987), Soviet violin prodigy
- Bruce Goldstein (born 1951), American film programmer, producer, archivist, historian

== See also ==
- Goldstein (surname)
