= Goldstein =

Goldstein may refer to:

- Goldstein (surname), people with the surname Goldstein
- Goldstein (film), a 1964 Philip Kaufman movie featuring actors from the Second City comedy troupe
- Goldstein & Blair, a publishing company
- Division of Goldstein, an electoral division in the Australian state of Victoria
- The Leon M. Goldstein High School for the Sciences
- Goldstein College, a residential college at the University of New South Wales
- Goldstein (Frankfurt am Main), a housing area in Frankfurt am Main, Germany

== See also ==
- The Theory and Practice of Oligarchical Collectivism, sometimes known as Goldstein's book, a fictional book in the novel Nineteen Eighty-Four
- Goldstone (disambiguation)
- Goldstine, a surname
