= Goldston =

Goldston may refer to:

== Places ==
- Goldston, North Carolina, town in Chatham County, North Carolina, United States

== People ==
- Daniel Goldston (born 1954), American mathematician
- Eli Goldston (1920–1974), American business leader and a leading spokesman for corporate social responsibility
- James Goldston (born 1968), British-American journalist, media executive, and former president of ABC News
- John Goldston (fl. 1397), English politician
- Justin Goldston, American academic at Penn State University
- Lori Goldston, American cellist
- Ralph Goldston (1929–2011), Canadian football player
- Robert Conroy Goldston (born 1927), American history writer
- Robert J. Goldston (born 1950), American physicist
- Will Goldston (1878–1948), English stage magician

== See also ==
- Goldson
- Goldstone (disambiguation)
