= Carvin (disambiguation) =

Carvin may refer to the following:

== Places ==
- Carvin, a French commune
- Carvin Creek Homesites, California, an unincorporated community

== People ==
- Carvin (name)

== Companies ==
- Carvin Corporation, a guitar amplifier and pro audio manufacturer
- Carvin & Ivan (Karma Productions), a music producer
- Kiesel Guitars, a guitar manufacturer that sells the brand Carvin Guitars
