= Phillip Goldstein =

Phillip Goldstein may refer to:

- Philip Guston (Phillip Goldstein, 1913–1980), painter and printmaker
- Phillip Goldstein (investor) (born 1945), American investor
