= Carvin (name) =

Carvin may refer to the following people:

Given name

- Carvin Goldstone (born 1984), South African comedian
- Carvin Nkanata (born 1991), American-born Kenyan sprinter

Surname

- Andy Carvin, American entrepreneur
- Chad Carvin (born 1974), American swimmer
- Jim Carvin (1929–2009), American political consultant
- Louis-Albert Carvin (1875–1951), French sculptor
- Michael Carvin (born 1944), American jazz drummer
