= Robinson Crusoes of Warsaw =

Poles who hid in the ruins of Warsaw

The term Robinson Crusoes of Warsaw, or the "Warsaw Robinsons", refers to Poles (including Jews) who, after the end of the 1944 Warsaw Uprising and the subsequent planned destruction of Warsaw by Nazi Germany, decided to stay and hide in the ruins of the German-occupied city. The period of hiding spanned as long as three and a half months, from the day of the capitulation of the uprising, October 2, 1944, until the entry of the Red Army on January 17, 1945. The hideaways lived in the ruins of houses, basements, and bunkers which had been prepared ahead of time. They lived in extremely dire circumstances, while the city was being destroyed around them. Some managed to escape Warsaw, many were captured and killed by the Germans, while others survived until the withdrawal of German troops.

The estimates of the number of hideaways vary from several hundred to approximately two thousand. Even though the majority of the Robinsons perished during the war, most of the information about their circumstances comes from those who survived. The largest group of hideaways consisted of around 36 individuals who were led by two medical doctors. The Robinsons also included a group of Jewish Combat Organization (Polish: Żydowska Organizacja Bojowa, ŻOB) Warsaw ghetto fighters, who managed to leave the ruined city in mid-November.

The terms "Robinson Crusoes" or "Robinsons" for the hideaways appeared almost immediately, and were popularized in many contemporary and later works, including memoirs, newspaper reports, and films, by both writers and the "Robinsons" themselves, the most famous of whom was the composer Władysław Szpilman, whose story was the subject of the films, The Warsaw Robinson (1950), and The Pianist (2002).

== Background ==
The Warsaw Uprising, which began on August 1, 1944, was an attempt by the Polish Home Army (Armia Krajowa, AK) to liberate the capital of Poland from Nazi occupation in advance of approaching Soviet forces. The insurrectionists hoped for Soviet and Allied support, but in early August Joseph Stalin halted the Red Army on the right bank of the Vistula and denied British and American planes, which carried aid to the uprising, landing rights in Soviet controlled territory. Despite the fact that in September the Soviets captured the Praga suburb and allowed a few limited landings by Allied planes, the insurrection became more and more isolated and pushed into an ever shrinking area within the city. By early September, without Soviet aid, the uprising was doomed. While capitulation talks were already in progress, the Germans took the suburb of Żoliborz on September 30. The final surrender agreement was concluded on October 2, by the commander of the Home Army in Warsaw, Tadeusz Bór-Komorowski, and the German general in charge of suppressing the uprising, Erich von dem Bach.

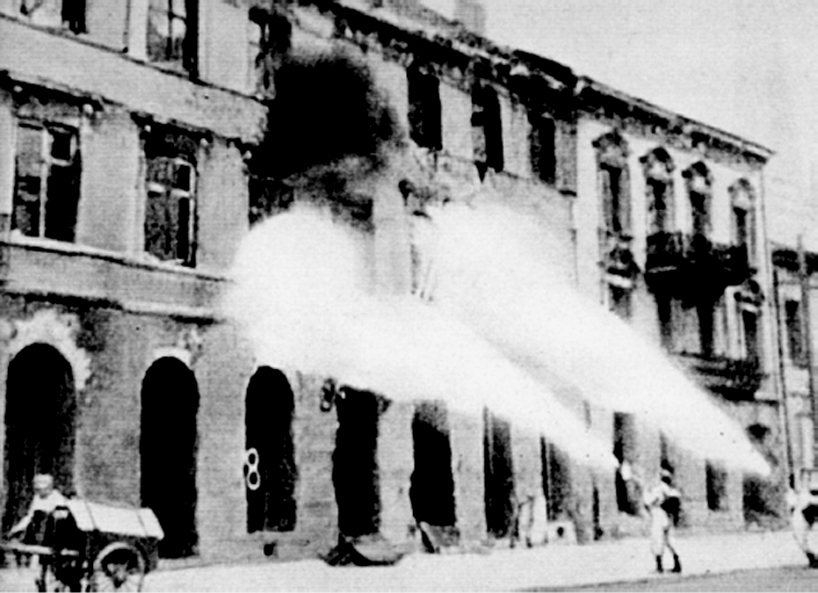
Special German units systematically burning down Warsaw's buildings which had not been destroyed in the fighting (1944).

The provisions of the capitulation agreement stipulated that the Home Army soldiers were to be accorded full combatant status and treated as prisoners of war. The civilian population of Warsaw was to evacuate the city, be transferred to holding camps and then released. From the date of the surrender all civilians and soldiers had three days to leave the capital.

Another portion of the agreement, point #10, stated that the German command would ensure the preservation of remaining public and private property as well as the evacuation or protection of objects and buildings of "artistic, cultural or sacred value". However, soon after the fighting was over at a conference held on October 9, 1944, Heinrich Himmler, Reichsführer of the SS, ordered the total destruction of the city. Himmler stated: "The city must completely disappear from the surface of the earth and serve only as a transport station for the Wehrmacht. No stone can remain standing. Every building must be razed to its foundation." The task of carrying out the destruction was assigned to SS-Brigadeführer Paul Otto Geibel. (Note: After the war, Geibel was sentenced to five years imprisonment by Czech authorities, and subsequently to life imprisonment by Polish ones, for crimes against civilians committed during the uprising. In 1956, for unknown reasons, he was released for good behavior. Intervention by Polish veterans and survivors of the uprising resulted in his re-incarceration. He committed suicide in 1966 while serving out the rest of his life sentence.) Subsequently, the buildings of the city were systematically reduced to ruin, one by one.

== Origins and usage of the term ==
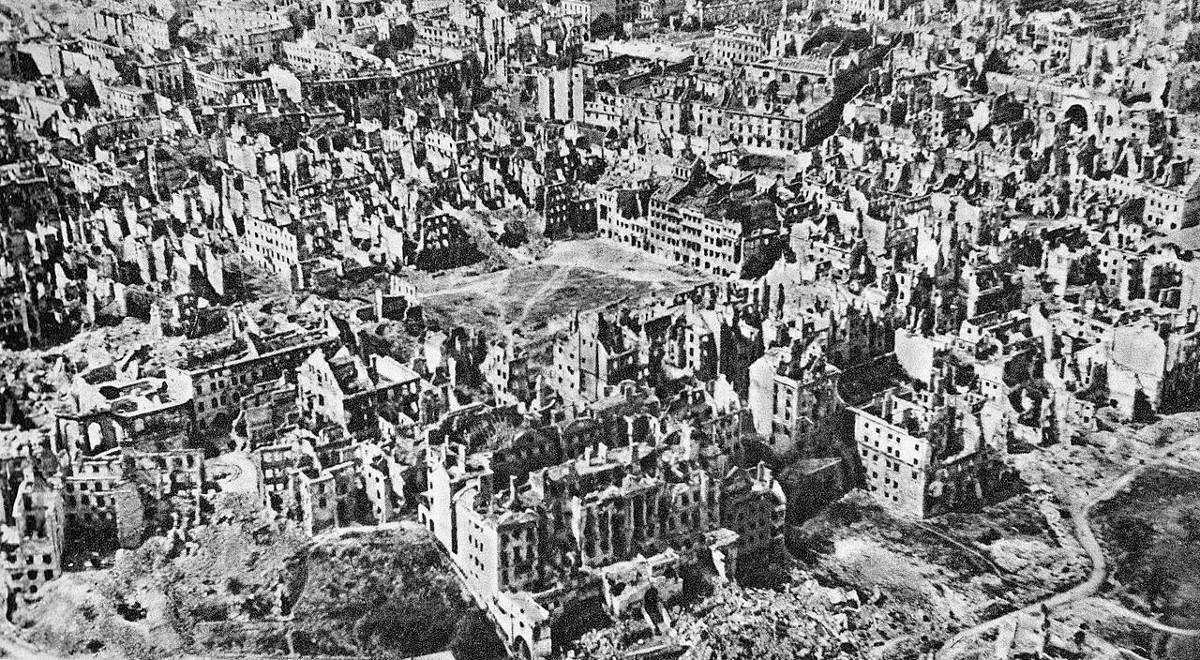
The ruins of Warsaw, after its systematic and planned destruction by the Nazis, in January 1945, at the time of entry of the Red Army

About two weeks after the fall of the Warsaw Uprising, on October 17, 1944, the commander of the German 9th Army stationed in Warsaw, Smilo von Lüttwitz, issued an order in which he informed his soldiers that there was a large number of "sneaky Poles" still hiding in the ruins of Warsaw. According to Smilo, they "posed a threat to the German forces". Von Lüttwitz ordered a large scale łapanka (police action/round-up) to "cleanse the city" of them. The order also sanctioned immediate execution of any individuals found hiding in the ruins. In some rare cases, those found were placed in a specially created concentration camp, and used as manual labor as the German army looted the remnants of the city.

The phenomenon of the hideaways was noticed soon after the Red Army captured Warsaw. On January 26, 1945, a bulletin of the Żydowska Agencja Prasowa (Jewish News Agency) reported that 48 individuals had emerged from hiding and referred to them as jaskiniowcy, or "cavemen". The term "Robinsons" soon became common, a reference to the fictional castaway Robinson Crusoe in the Daniel Defoe novel. The Soviet writer and journalist Vasily Grossman, upon entering the ruined city, described finding four Jewish and six non-Jewish Poles who had just left their hideouts.

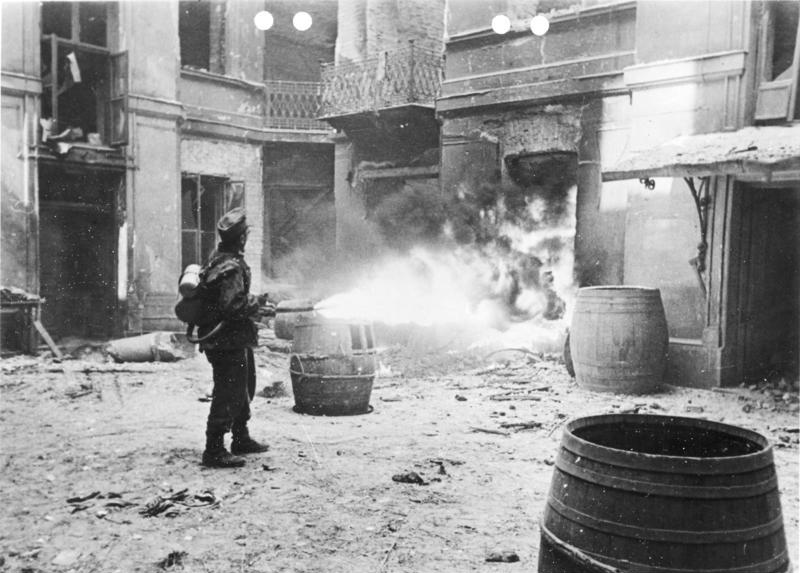
After the capitulation of the Warsaw Uprising, the city was subject to systematic house-by-house destruction. In this German photo, a Verbrennungskommando soldier uses a flamethrower to set fire to the ruins of a building. As a result, the only hiding places remaining for the Robinsons were basements or bunkers that had been prepared ahead of time.

The term and the analogy with the castaway has often been made by Robinsons in their own memoirs, as well as by other writers. Dawid Fogelman had been imprisoned at the Gęsiówka concentration camp. After the camp was liberated by the Polish Home Army, he joined its ranks and fought in the uprising. At the end of the fighting, Fogelman became a Robinson, hiding in a bunker on Szczęśliwa Street, where he began writing a diary. He wrote: "We lived like Robinson Crusoe, with the one difference that he was free, could move about freely, while we lived in hiding." While Fogelman's diary survived, his ultimate fate is unknown.

In his memoirs, Władysław Szpilman also compared himself to Crusoe and, like Fogelman, emphasized the isolation and hopelessness which characterized the Warsaw Crusoes. Szpilman's memoir served as a basis for a screenplay, written as early as 1945 by the Polish writers Jerzy Andrzejewski and Czesław Miłosz, (Note: Miłosz, who had written scholarly works on Defoe's novel, was later awarded the Nobel Prize for literature.) entitled Robinson of Warsaw. The movie that was eventually filmed, Miasto Nieujarzmione ("Unyoked city"), was heavily censored by the communist authorities, and its original theme changed to such an extent (Note: In the movie the character of the Warsaw Robinson was changed into that of a Soviet parachutist.) that Miłosz requested his name be removed from the film's credits. The experience with the film contributed to Miłosz's disillusionment with cinema as an artistic medium.

Wacław Gluth-Nowowiejski, a member of the Home Army who was wounded during the uprising and barely managed to escape the Wehrmacht's Marymont massacre of civilians and wounded soldiers, hid in the basement of a destroyed house from mid-September until mid-November. Gluth-Nowowiejski wrote several books about his experiences after the war, including Rzeczpospolita Gruzów ("The Commonwealth of Ruins") and Stolica jaskiń: z pamięci warszawskiego Robinsona ("The capital of caves: memoirs of a Warsaw Robinson").

Major Danuta Ślązak of the Home Army, hid out with a group of wounded patients whom she had saved from a hospital that had been set on fire by the Germans during the last days of the uprising. After the war she wrote a book about her experiences, Byłam Warszawskim Robinsonem (I was a Warsaw Robinson). A portion of her group left the hiding place after German troops called out for them to surrender and were immediately executed. The rest remained hidden and escaped detection. Eventually they used the corpses of their murdered companions to disguise the entry to their hiding place. (Note: After the war Ślązak married one of her fellow Robinsons that she had rescued.)

The name "Robinsons" has also been used to refer to those Jews who hid out in the ruins of the Warsaw Ghetto in the aftermath of the Warsaw Ghetto Uprising. Uri Orlev's (Jerzy Orlowski) children's book The Island on Bird Street (1981), adapted into a 1997 film, tells the story of an 11-year-old boy who hides out in the ruins of the ghetto. Orlev also draws analogies with Robinson Crusoe in this work; in fact one of the few things Alex, the story's protagonist, possesses is a copy of Defoe's novel.

Other memoirs by the Robinsons include Bunkier (The Bunker) by Chaim Goldstein, Byłem ochroniarzem Karskiego (Karski's Bodyguard) by Dawid Landau, Ukrywałem się w Warszawie : styczeń 1943 – styczeń 1945 (I Hid in Warsaw: January 1943 – January 1945) by Stefan Chaskielewicz, Moje szczęśliwe życie (My Fortunate Life) by Szymon Rogoźinski, and Aniołowie bez skrzydeł (Angels Without Wings) by Czesława Fater. Many other testimonies and recollections are contained in the archives of the Emmanuel Ringelblum Żydowski Instytut Historyczny (Jewish Historical Institute) in Warsaw and Yad Vashem in Jerusalem.

== Reasons for staying ==
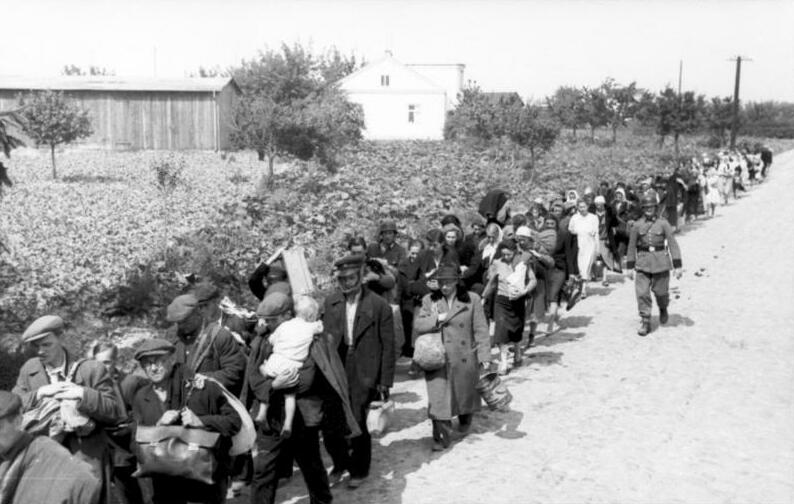
German documentation of Polish civilians leaving Warsaw for the Pruszków internment camp after the uprising. Those who did not trust the Germans to abide by the capitulation agreement decided to stay and hide in the ruins of the city despite the penalty if caught: death.

The capitulation agreement between the Home Army and German forces stipulated that insurgents were to be treated as regular prisoners of war. The city's civilians were to be transferred to transit camps and afterward released.

Although the agreement did not stipulate different treatment for Poles who were ethnically Jewish, many Jews feared that the agreement would not be honored in their case. In fact, the Nazis conducted a "medical examination" at the Pruszków internment camp, in order to "catch out" Jews from among Warsaw's refugees. (Note: The medical examination included a communal shower, which was used as a pretext to carry out an examination for circumcision.) As a consequence, a large number of the Jews who were still in Warsaw at the time of the uprising, decided to remain in hiding rather than join the non-Jewish civilians leaving the city. (Note: By this time, the overwhelming majority of the city's Jewish population had been taken to death camps and killed.) According to memoirs from the period, the choice often came down to whether a particular person "looked Aryan" and could pass for a non-Jewish Pole.

A significant number of non-Jewish Poles also did not trust the Germans and decided not to leave the city. Many wounded Home Army soldiers became stranded during the uprising and were simply not able to evacuate in time. For others, the choice to remain resulted from feelings of despair and hopelessness brought by the fall of the uprising; at least initially, they simply did not have the motivation to leave.

== Number and demographics ==
Between the end of the Warsaw Ghetto Uprising (May 1943) and beginning of 1944, there were between 10,000 and 20,000 Jews hiding in the Ghetto ruins. The number of Robinsons after the Warsaw Uprising has been estimated at between several hundred and two thousand, spread across all the suburbs of Warsaw. Another source gives the number as between 400 and 1,000. Most of those hiding were Jewish, including some who had been in hiding since the fall of the ghetto uprising, though a significant number were non-Jewish Poles. Unlike Szpilman, whose case was somewhat unrepresentative, most of those in hiding remained in medium-sized to large groups, often of mixed ethnicities. The majority of the Robinsons were men.

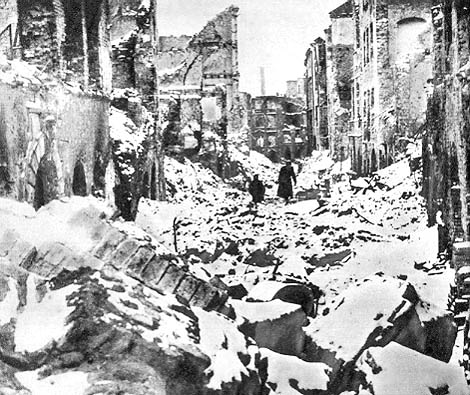
Ruins of Warsaw, Piwna Street. The Robinsons lived in basements and bunkers under the rubble for three and a half months.

Many of the hiding places and makeshift bunkers were prepared in advance by those anticipating the fall of the uprising. As a result, the sequence whereby people became Robinsons closely followed the military developments of the insurrection. The first groups went into hiding in Wola during the Wola massacre and in Starówka (Warsaw Old Town), while fighting was still taking place in other parts of the city. The majority of the Robinsons hid when German forces captured the Żoliborz and Śródmieście (Warsaw City Centre) districts from the insurgents.

The largest known group of Robinsons was composed of approximately 37 people (Note: Some primary sources give numbers as high as 49 or 56 individuals.) under the leadership of Roman Fiszer and medical doctors, Dr. Beer and Prof. Henryk Beck. Beck was the director of a makeshift insurgent hospital during the uprising. As it became clear that the insurrection was going to fail, he and Cpt. Władysław Kowalski, a Home Army soldier who also decided to stay, converted two adjacent basements into a well-equipped and -supplied hiding place. The group stockpiled water, coffee, medicines, fuel, and various foodstuffs. Additionally, Beck kept a set of watercolors, crayons, ink, and paper, which he used to illustrate life in the bunker. (Note: The drawings and paintings are now part of collection of the Jewish Historical Institute.) As some of the members had fought in the uprising, the group also possessed a small cache of weapons, unusual for Robinsons. A dog, Bunkierek ("bunker puppy"), also stayed with them and, according to the memoirs, did not bark or make any noise.

After their water ran out, the Beck/Fiszer group developed a routine whereby some of the group worked to dig a well, while others watched out for approaching Germans, and yet others ventured outside the bunker to scavenge for useful items. The group eventually dug their way to two water canals and built a well. On November 17, during an excursion outside the bunker, the group made contact with a small partisan unit, also in hiding, led by a Russian POW who had been liberated during the uprising. Subsequently, several of the group would join the partisans for small scale attacks on German troops. The group survived until the entry of the Red Army in mid-January. (Note: After the war, Beck continued his medical practice in Wrocław. He was the first director of a newly established women's clinic, associated with the Wrocław University of Technology and University of Wrocław.)

== Living conditions ==
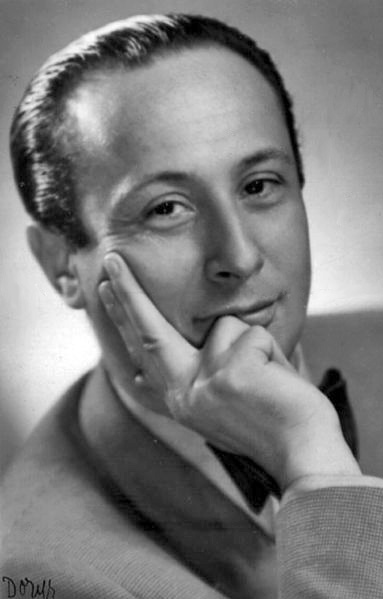
Władysław Szpilman, the most famous of the Robinsons, and subject of the 2002 film The Pianist.

Initially, the living conditions of the Robinsons varied according to whether or not they had had time to prepare. There were roughly three days between the signing of the capitulation and the deadline for civilians to leave the city, during which those who made the decision to stay could stockpile food and water, and camouflage their hiding places. As time passed, supplies ran out, and many Robinsons had to change their locations for security reasons. The situation soon became equally desperate for all who remained.

While food was extremely hard to come by, an even more pressing need was obtaining drinking water. Thirst and the search for water are mentioned in most of the Robinsons' memoirs. The most common sources originally included toilet cisterns, boilers, and standing water found inside bathtubs. As these ran out, those in hiding were forced to risk sneaking access to wells, which were often guarded by German soldiers. Some memoirs describe long periods observing a particular well and waiting for a chance to obtain a quick drink. Another method involved obtaining polluted sewer water from the canals, and then filtering it through coals wrapped in rags. Generally, records indicate that whatever scant water supplies existed were shared fairly among individuals hiding as a group. In at least one instance, one person was unable to withstand the thirst and drank the whole group's water supply. As a result, Jakub Wiśnia, a former Gęsiówka inmate and after its liberation, a Home Army soldier, was court-martialed by his fellow group members and sentenced to death. The execution was to be postponed until after liberation, but when that occurred, the Robinsons were so overwhelmed with joy, the crime was forgiven and the sentence was never mentioned again. (Note: Wiśnia lived in Warsaw until 1984.)

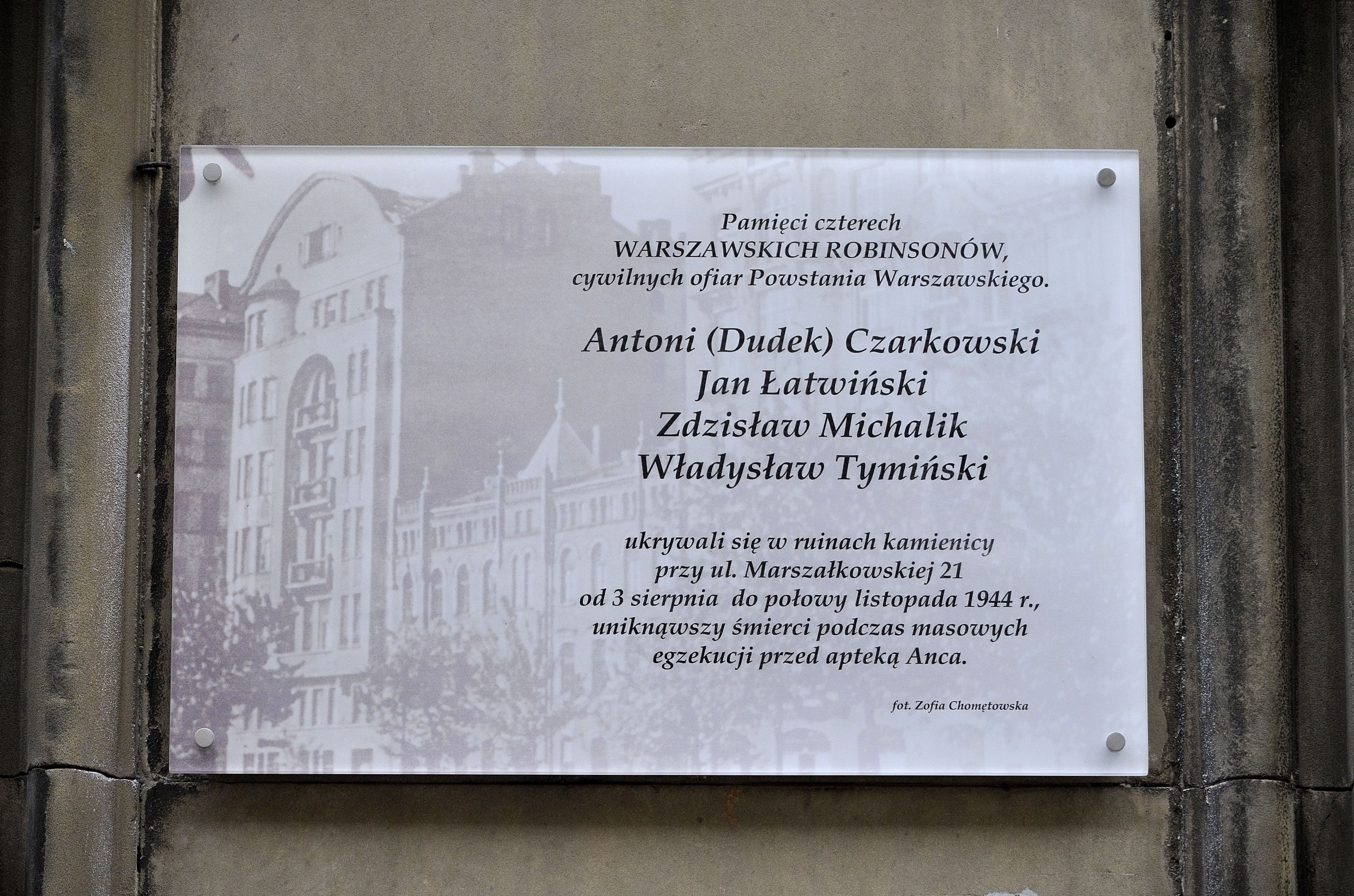
Plaque at 21 Marszałkowska Street commemorating four Robinsons who hid in this building between August and November 1944

There were numerous instances of death from drinking poisoned or fouled water (there were still many unburied, decomposing corpses inside the ruins). In one instance, desperate Robinsons were driven to drink their own urine and subsequently died.

The coming of winter improved the water situation for some who had access to icicles, but the cold made living conditions worse. It was impossible for those in hiding to build fires to warm themselves, as smoke could reveal their location to the Germans. As a consequence, many died of cold.

Unlike the Robinson Crusoe of the novel, who craved human contact, most of the Warsaw Crusoes tried to avoid it at all cost. This contradiction was noted by both the Robinsons and those who wrote about them after the war. Being discovered by the Germans in almost all cases meant immediate death. There were, however, some exceptions, the best known being that of Szpilman's encounter with Wilm Hosenfeld, a captain of the Wehrmacht who helped to hide and feed him. In a few instances those captured were first forced to help the Germans with the looting of the city's ruins, before being either executed or sent to the Pruszków camp.

A few of the Robinsons actually tried to actively take revenge on the occupying forces. The most famous of these, who became a local legend, was an individual known only as "Ares" (after the Greek god of war), described by Gluth-Nowowiejski, based on interviews with the Robinsons he conducted. Ares, active in the Śródmieście district, staged numerous ambushes of German soldiers, in at least one case using an improvised explosive device. (Note: In another, perhaps apocryphal, case Ares arranged a group of dead and decomposing German and insurrectionist corpses sitting in a circle around a playing gramophone. When a patrol came to investigate he threw a bunch of tied together grenades at them) According to Gluth-Nowowiejski's sources, he would leave behind graffiti of his name, as well as slogans such as "Hitler kaput". Other messages included communications to the German soldiers. In one case he dumped a body of a soldier he had killed with the note: "This awaits all of you in Warsaw". In another he wrote: "Ares is a ghost, not matter – your search for him is useless". Eventually, Ares met his demise when the Germans left some poisoned food for him to find. Soon they discovered a man in the ruins who was obviously sick from having eaten it. He shot at them before taking his own life. According to some sources, other individuals took on Ares' struggle but used the names of other Greek Gods as their signature.

Within some of the destroyed suburbs, a limited postal system between various Robinson groups was established. Dawid Landau had served as a bodyguard to the courier of the Polish government in exile, Jan Karski, while Karski secretly entered the ghetto to gather information for a report on the extermination of Polish Jews by Nazi Germany for the Western allies, in 1943. Later, Landau fought in both of the Warsaw uprising as part of Żydowski Związek Wojskowy (Jewish Military Union, ŻZW) and afterward decided to stay in the ruins. In his memoirs he reports that the post functioned through the use of empty electrical socket boxes. Various groups would leave notes for others informing them of who was alive and in hiding, news from the front that had been obtained, as well as requests for special forms of assistance. According to Landau, the most common pleas were for doctors or other forms of medical help.

== Escape ==
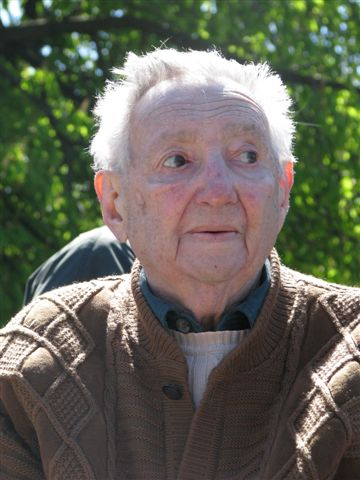
Marek Edelman (in 2009), one of the ŻOB Ghetto fighters who initially stayed in the ruins, but then escaped from the city in mid-November 1944, with help from the Polish Home Army.

Some of those who had initially remained in the ruins of the city after the uprising later made attempts to leave. This was particularly true of Robinsons who had stayed, not of their own choice, but due to unfavorable circumstances.

The best known case of post-uprising departure involved a group of Jewish Combat Organization fighters under the leadership of Icchak Cukierman and Marek Edelman, who had taken part in both the Ghetto and the Warsaw Uprisings. Originally, the former Ghetto fighters stayed together in a large group, but in the second week of October, some of them moved to a different location. Those remaining stayed in the same place on Promyka Street until mid-November, when they were contacted by Ala Margolis, a courier from the Home Army, who had previously managed to leave the city. Margolis and a "rescue squadron" of five people returned to get the rest of the group out. The Germans had begun a systematic search and destruction of ruined houses near the hiding place, which meant time was running out. Dressed as nurses and doctors, with clothes and Red Cross IDs provided by Dr. Lesław Węgrzynowski, director of the Home Army sanitation unit, the rescue squadron and the seven in hiding made their way out of the city through two German checkpoints. The group consisted of five men and two women: Edelman, Cukierman, Cywia Lubetkin (later, Cukierman's wife), Tosia Goliborska, Julek Fiszgrund, Tuwia Borzykowski, and Zygmunt Warman. The first checkpoint was crossed during dinner, and the Germans did not bother to examine the group, but at the second, an SS officer noticed that Warman, who was lying in a stretcher, was wearing combat boots. He yelled, "These are Polish bandits!", but one of the escorts dressed as a nurse quickly declared that the patients in the stretcher were ill with typhus. The SS soldiers backed off, and the group moved on its way. (Note: After leaving Warsaw, the ŻOB fighters moved to Grodzisk Mazowiecki, where they continued their struggle, collected funds, organized help for Jews still in hiding, and compiled reports which the Home Army passed on to the Polish government-in-exile in London.)

In many cases, the opportunity to leave Warsaw came by chance. For example, the hiding diarist Wacław Gluth-Nowowiejski was taken out, after he was accidentally found by a woman (name unknown) who had been given permission by the Germans to remove some of her property from the ruins. On their way out of the city the group also had to pass German checkpoints and encountered difficulties similar to those of the ŻOB fighters. A Wehrmacht soldier accused the wounded and sick Gluth-Nowowiejski of being a "bandit" but let him pass after protestations made by his escort.

== Individual Robinsons ==
Of the total number of the Robinsons who hid in the ruins of the city only a portion's names and locations are known. The recognized individuals are mostly the ones who either survived the war themselves or who came into contact with other survivors at some point. As such, the list of the known hideaways is not representative; the majority of the Robinsons died while in hiding, and hence their identities, were never recorded. The table below lists some of those who have been mentioned in the memoirs or other written works on the subject.

Partial list of Robinsons
Number of individuals	Names	Address	Comment
10	Władysław Kobus, Zofia Kobus, 4 unknown. Jakow Mienżycki, Aron Mienżycki, Isaj Dawidowicz, Abram Klinkier	Żelazna 95c	Group encountered by Vasily Grossman upon entrance of the Red Army into ruins of Warsaw. Their hideout was a bunker on the fourth story of a bombed out house.
1?	Calel Perechodnik	Somewhere on Pańska street	Perechodnik was a former Jewish policeman from the Otwock Ghetto. After the Warsaw Ghetto Uprising he hid out on the "Aryan side". He took part in the Warsaw Uprising as part of the Chrobry II Battalion. After the fall of the Uprising Perechodnik hid in the ruins but died (either by suicide, being burnt to death, or murder by looters) soon afterward.
16	Unknown	Pańska street	9 of the 16 survived
2	13 year old Henryk Kowalewski and his father	Lwowska street	The father left the hiding place one day, in search of food, and never returned. Henryk survived the war.
1	Marian Uramowski	Szustra (Dombrowskiego) street	
12	Jerzy Szajkowski, others	Trębacka 4	Szajkowski managed to escape from the Grand Theatre, Warsaw Massacre. The other 11 were escapees from a mass murder on Kozia street.
More than 10, including one newborn	Józef Dódziński, Witold Łazowski, Jan Fetinger and at least five others including a 3-year-old girl and a pregnant woman	Ogrodowa and Leszno street.	The pregnant woman gave birth to a daughter on December 1, 1944. Eight of the group split from the rest in late October. One male died due to an accident while climbing between the ruins; the rest survived until the entry of the Red Army.
More than 13	Jan Gadaliński and family, at least 12 others	Karolkowa street in Wola	Initially the group hid under a wagon in a tram station; later they moved to a burnt out house. All survived.
4	Fania and Sewek Glazer, Basia and Mietek Chwat. Fania and Basia were the Nowikówna sisters.	Hoża 38	The hiding place was under a small theater stage.
5	A Jewish Pole, whose name is unknown, and four Home Army soldiers: Anatol Orwicz-Urbaniak, Władysław Tybinkowski, and two unknown	Flora street	In a memoir about his experience Tybinkowski wrote: "Some have compared us to Robinson Crusoe. To my mind (...) Crusoe faced a much easier task than the one we did in those ten weeks".
2	Stefan Ślusarczyk, Franciszek Głowacki	Solec street	Both men were running from a German advance during the Uprising and hid in a furnace of a gilding factory, where they stayed until even after the Russians had taken over Warsaw, afraid to leave the safety of the hiding place.
8, later 3	14-year-old Jewish boy, five women and two men. Names unknown.	Sienkiewicza street	On October 22, the group was caught by a German patrol while trying to get water from a polluted pool. One of the men and the 14-year-old escaped unnoticed. One of the captured women managed to escape and rejoined them later. The three of them survived until the Russians entered Warsaw.
7	Chaim Goldstein, Ignac ?, Henryk Kapłan, Icchak ?, Daniel ?, Chana ?, Samek ?	Franciszkanska street	The "Goldstein group" had fought in the Warsaw Uprising in Old Town. Daniel was originally from Belgium and had spent time in various concentration camps prior to ending up in Warsaw and being liberated by the Home Army. According to his memoirs, hiding out in isolation in the ruins was far more stressful than any concentration camp he had been imprisoned in. The group survived the war.
1	Gabriel Cybulski	Ogrodowa street	Cybulski went into hiding as early as early September. In all he spent five months in isolation. He survived.
10	Dawid and Luba Landau, others	Pańska street	At the end of the uprising Dawid acquired arms from evacuating Home Army soldiers who would "rather give them up to Poles than to Germans". On at least one occasion they used the weapons to strike back at the Germans by capturing, and executing, lone looters.

Sources for table:

== See also ==
- Wolf children
