= Brading (surname) =

Brading is a surname. Notable people with the surname include:

- Alison Brading (1939–2011), British scientist
- Charles Brading (1935–2016), American pharmacist and politician
- David Brading (1936–2024), English historian, academic and writer
- Katherine Brading (born 1970), philosopher and historian of science
- Ralph Brading (1934–?), Australian politician
- Reginald Brading (1899–1926), English World War I flying ace

== See also ==
- Sanna Bråding (born 1980), Swedish actress
