= Allan Goldstein =

Allan Goldstein may refer to:

- Allan A. Goldstein (born 1949), American film director and screenwriter
- Allan L. Goldstein (born 1937), American molecular biologist

== See also ==
- Allen A. Goldstein, American mathematician and astrophysicist
