= Hill International =

American construction consulting firm

Hill International, Inc.
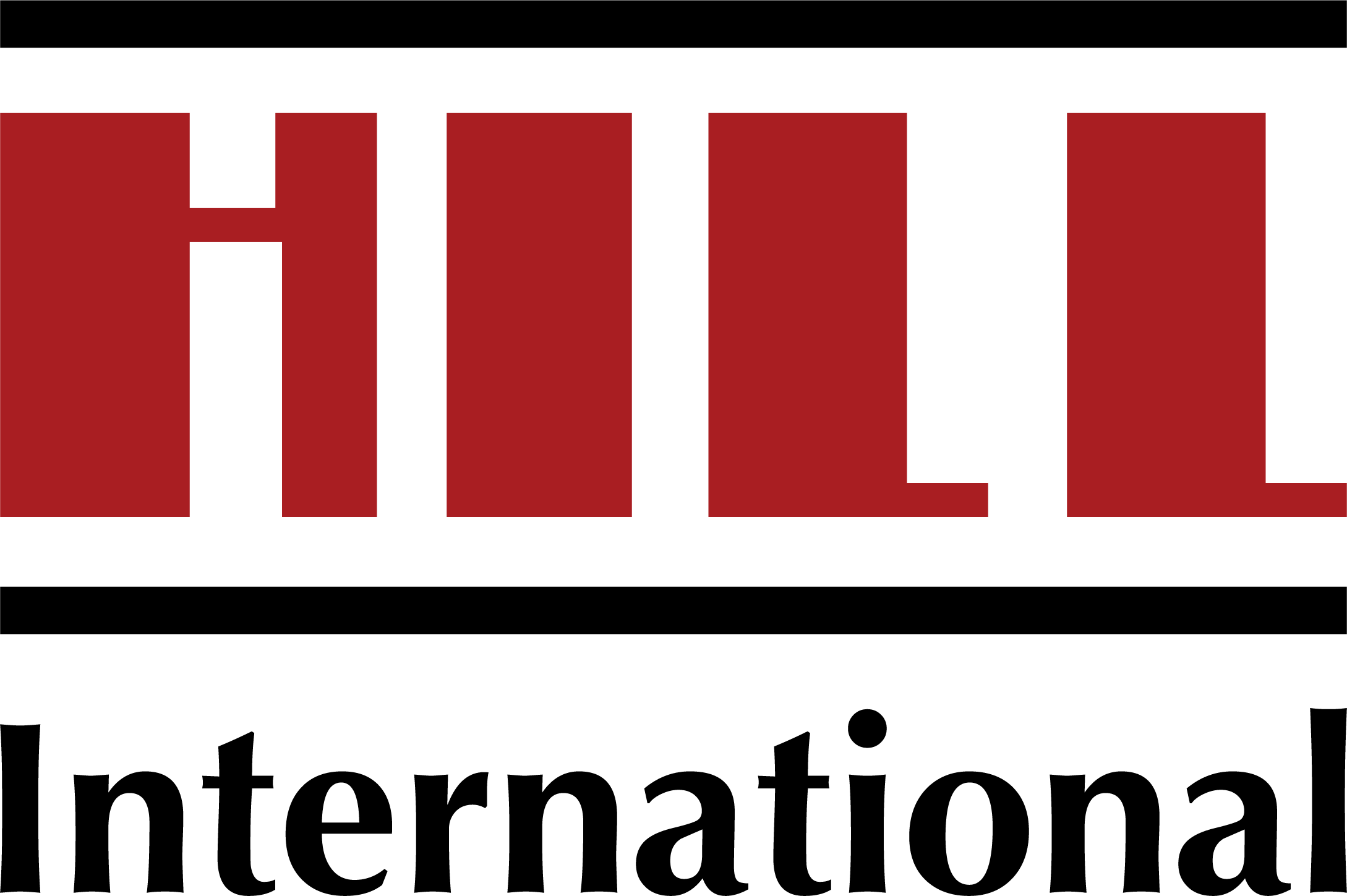
- Type: Private
- Industry: Professional services (Construction)
- Founded: 1976
- Headquarters: Mount Laurel, New Jersey, U.S.
- Key people: Raouf S. Ghali, CEO
- Products: Project management; Program management; Construction Management; Facilities Management; Consulting and Advisory Services
- Number of employees: 4,300 (as of March 2026)
- Divisions: Project Management; Advisory Services; Management Consulting
- Website: www.hillintl.com

Hill International, Inc., a member of the Global Infrastructure Solutions, Inc., family of companies, is a global construction consulting firm. Founded in 1976, the company's corporate headquarters is in Mount Laurel, New Jersey, U.S.

Hill provides program and project management, construction management, project management oversight, advisory, cost management, facilities management, commissioning, quality assurance, scheduling, risk management, other services to clients undertaking major construction projects and programs worldwide.

Hill has participated in over 90,000 project assignments with a total construction value of more than $1 trillion. In 2024, the firm was ranked as the third-largest construction management firm-for-fee in the United States according to Building Design+Construction magazine and the seventh-largest program management firm by Engineering News-Record magazine.

== History ==
The company was founded in 1976 by Irvin E. Richter and Michael W. C. Emerson, P.E. Richter had worked in Construction Claims Consulting at Wagner, Hohns, Inglis Inc., Mount Holly, New Jersey, from 1974 to 1976 before he started the firm to provide similar services. The first offices were in Richter's home in Willingboro, New Jersey. The name "Hill" was to designate the preferred location of the company office in Cherry Hill, New Jersey.

Richter immediately began a series of acquisitions. One was Construction Management Services, Inc. (CMS, a Critical Path Method [CPM] scheduling company). CMS was formed by A. James Waldon, Dwight Zink, and William De Vos. Several of the principals at CMS as well as an employee, Joseph J. Ranieri, had worked at Mauchly Associates, a consulting company founded by Dr. John W. Mauchly. Zink and Ranieri, were two of the early practitioners of CPM, an early application of computers to construction and procurement scheduling. They helped establish CMS, a CPM consulting firm that worked extensively in scheduling construction projects and forensic scheduling analysis and both worked at Hill after the acquisition.

=== Government contracting ===
Hill prospered in the late 1970s, in part because of the explosion of local construction projects funded by the newly established United States Environmental Protection Agency (EPA). The EPA required the use of the Federal Acquisition Regulation and claims (as "Requests for Equitable Adjustments") became the norm for local procurement. The firm had about 20 full-time employees by the end of 1979. In 1980 the firm opened its first branch office in Washington, DC and began to serve the U.S. government and government contractors from this location.

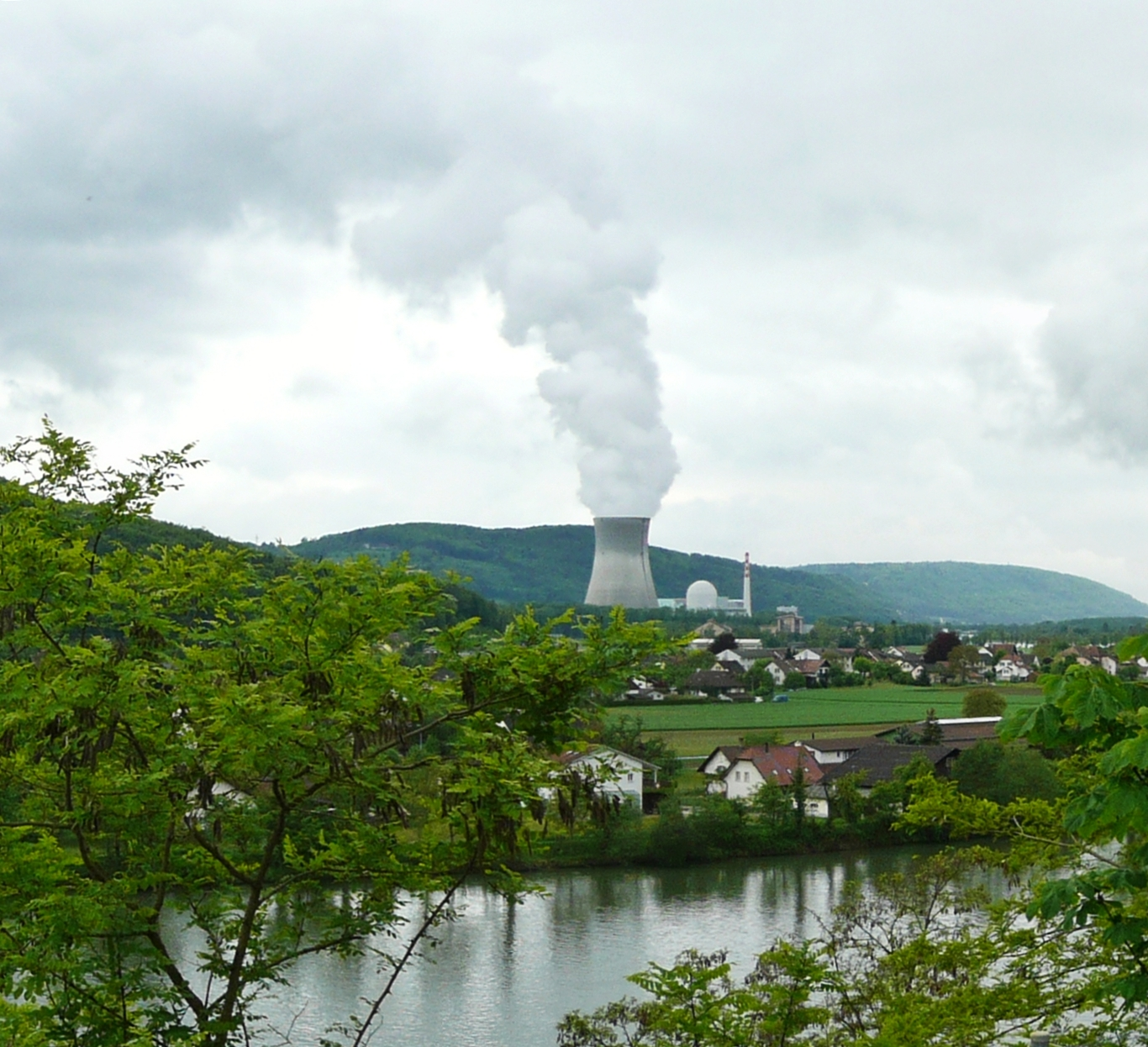
Hill provided claims services for the Leibstadt Nuclear Power Station in Switzerland.

By the 1980s, another series of events in the construction industry fueled a further increase in construction claims and the growth of Hill - the construction of numerous nuclear power plants. The construction of these plants was highly regulated and resulted in overruns in cost and schedule for almost every plant built. Over 46 plants had been commissioned in the 1980s alone. At this time, the Nuclear Power Generating Industry was at the end of a rapid increase in constructing plants and began to terminate many projects. This decline had already begun due in large part to nuclear accidents at Three Mile Island and Chernobyl. This brought another explosion in construction claims for schedule and cost overruns as well as termination claims, including utilities, engineers, and nuclear reactor manufacturers as well as contractors and subcontractors. At this time, Hill brought in William J. Doyle to oversee the growth in nuclear related claims business. Doyle had built a small mechanical contracting company into one of the largest mechanical contractors in the nation, General Energy Resources, Inc., whose core business was subcontracting at nuclear power plant projects. Doyle then served as Senior VP of Northrop Corporation before he became an executive of Hill overseeing much of the nuclear claims work as well as other multi-million-dollar projects.

In the 1980s and 1990s, Doyle oversaw the beginnings of the expansion from a claims consulting firm into a project management company. Hill's initial ventures into Project Management were through a concept called "Troubled Project Turnaround". In 1981, Hill was involved in supporting a major litigation at the Tropicana Casino & Resort Atlantic City where what was supposed to be a $180 million project almost doubled to $300 million. The firm provided technical expertise in resolving the claims and litigation support, and also helped manage the completion of the construction. According to Richter, "... we became a construction manager as a result of that project and eventually also became involved in project management and program management afterward."

Hill continued to expand its management role (re: "Troubled Project Turnarounds") at the City of Niagara Falls, New York. Hill helped the city gain control of the stalled construction of its wastewater treatment plant project and maintain liaison with state and federal regulatory agencies. Hill then acted as the city's construction manager (CM) to complete the reconstruction of the wastewater treatment plant. The city had actually been one of Hill's first clients in 1977 when it hired the firm after having been impressed by its work for a contractor in a claims situation with the city. Similar troubled project CM work took place at the Point Pleasant, PA, Water Intake and Pump Station.

During this time frame Hill became one of the initial Project Management Oversight contractors (PMOC) for the Federal Transit Administration (FTA) during the construction of the Sacramento (CA) Light Rail. Hill next worked for the FTA on the LA Metro. Hill was now included in this FTA list of PMOCs, who were mostly large, established CM firms such as Daniel, Mann, Johnson, & Mendenhall, Fluor Daniel, Parsons Brinckerhoff, and Stone & Webster, among others. By 1984 Hill had opened a Los Angeles Office.

In 1988, Hill expanded its services by acquiring Gibbs & Hill, an engineering / design firm in New York City. Also in 1988, it entered the environmental market by purchasing Kaselaan & D'Angelo (K&D), an air-quality design firm that specialized in asbestos clean-up consulting. The acquisitions raised company revenue to $200 million and increased company size to more than 2,000 employees.

Hill entered the program management service sector in 1991 when it became program manager for the New Jersey Turnpike Widening Program (Interchanges 11–14). This $543 million program involved 9 design sections, 7 construction sections, and more than 50 separate construction and procurement contracts.

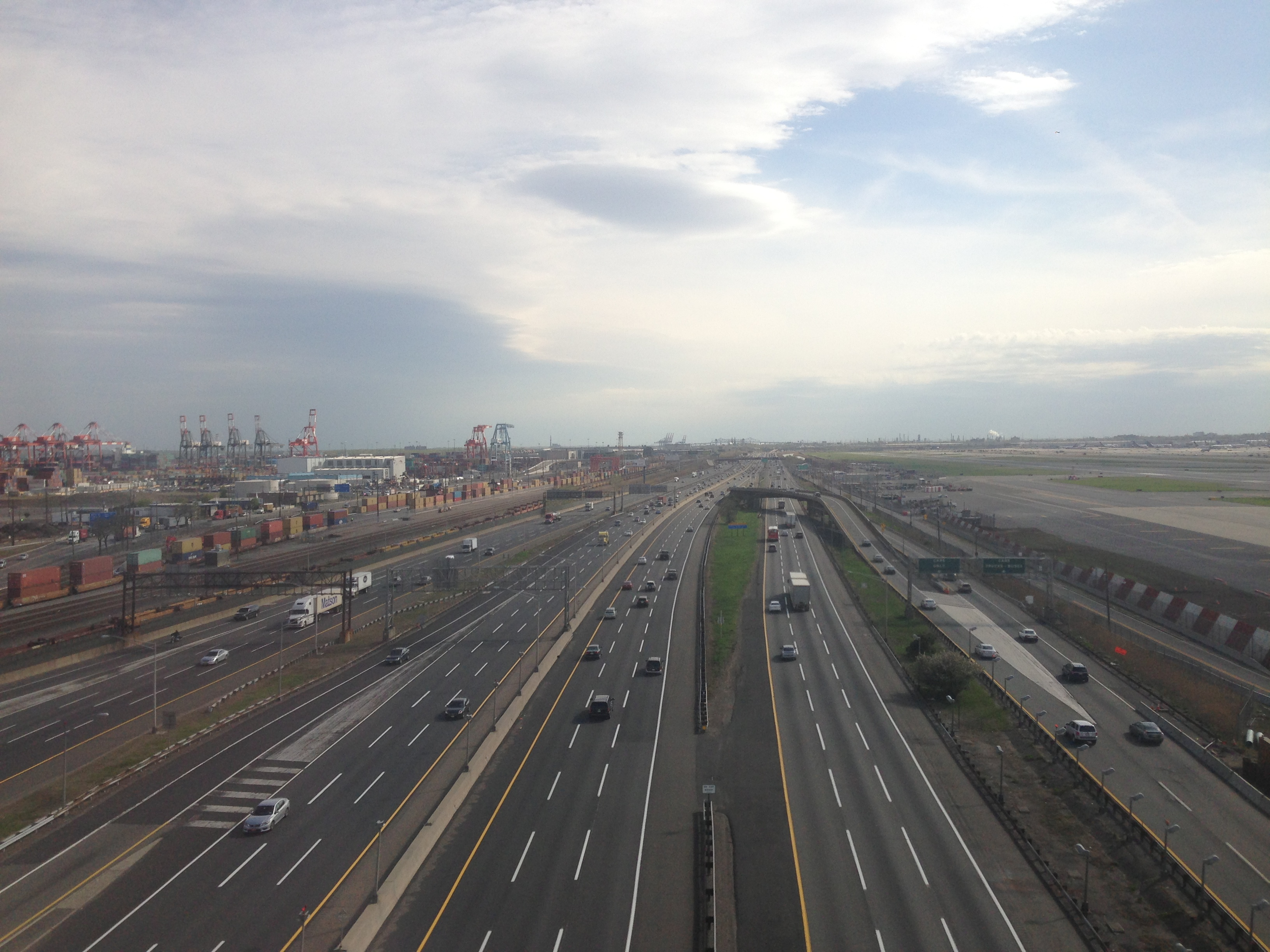
Part of the New Jersey Turnpike Widening Project to Newark Airport (Photo by Famartin)

In 1993, Hill sold Gibbs & Hill in three parts to United Engineers, then a subsidiary of Raytheon, in 1993 and K&D to ATC Environmental, of Mount Laurel, NJ. Hill began a successful turnaround at this time by concentrating on its core construction claims business and seeking to expand its growing construction / project / program management sector.

=== International expansion ===
Hill has been "International" since its beginnings. Some CMS clients who became Hill clients were involved with projects in Europe and Africa, including an early iron pellet plant project (in the late 1970s).

In 1981, Hill represented a Filipino labor contractor providing on-site claims and dispute resolution services at King Khalid Military City, a project being built in Saudi Arabia by the United States Army Corps of Engineers. The form of contract was the FAR.

Hill first attempted to open a non-field overseas office in London in 1981 when it hired John A.W. Tanner, an executive with Pullman Swindell (now Swindell Dressler International Co.) The venture was ultimately unsuccessful, and the office closed in 1985.

However, Hill continued to expand its international claims work. Its contacts in the nuclear plant claims arena included General Electric (who used Hill services on its Boiling Water Reactor). GE's overseas subsidiaries also used Hill's services on several claims in Egypt, including the Abu Sultan Power Plant and other projects in the early 1980s. The firm assisted a Spanish joint venture in evaluating their potential claims against the government of Kuwait on a major road modernization project in Kuwait City.

By this time, in 1983, Richter had authored a book, International Construction Claims, Avoiding and Resolving Disputes and the international momentum landed Hill in Abu Dhabi with an independent overseas office that was turning a profit from the start. Hill had landed the role as a lead consultant for the Abu Dhabi Claims Committee.

Hill continued to pursue offices elsewhere. In the early 1990s, it was selected by Bechtel to help guide the completion of the Channel Tunnel Project that had begun in 1986. But as work progressed, the owner, Eurotunnel, and the Anglo-French consortium responsible for design and construction, TransManche Link, were plagued by severe cost, schedule, and safety problems. In 1990, the banks funding the project became involved. When it became clear the project was at risk, Eurotunnel called on Bechtel to get the project back on track. Hill was hired by this project rescue team to perform claims analysis and mitigation and had a project team working with Eurotunnel for several years and eventually opened an independent office in London.

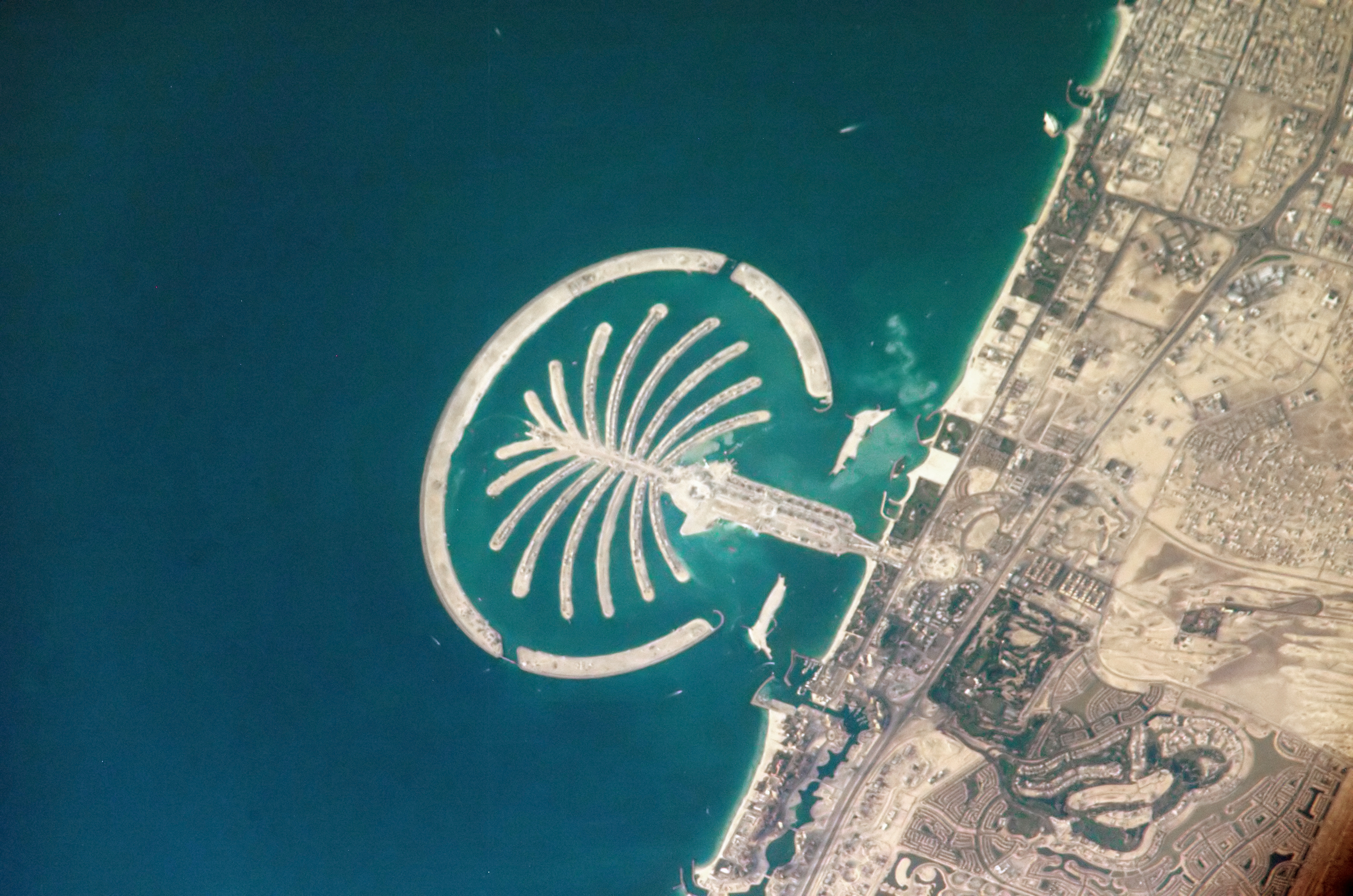
Hill provided CM services for Palm Jumeirah, Dubai, United Arab Emirates.

Hill sought to bring in qualified European staff to run their European offices. It hired Raouf Ghali, who was educated in the U.S. Ghali had recently been hired by Hill and had worked leading Hill on the Petronas Twin Tower Project in Kuala Lumpur, Malaysia. Ghali, then working in the London office (but also working from his home base of Athens, Greece), expanded the Construction Management group of Hill. For example, the firm began work on the Athens Metro, the National Library of Latvia, and, in 2002, the Palm Islands Project in Dubai. Hill moved its corporate headquarters from Willingboro to Marlton, NJ, in 2002. By 2004, Hill had about 500 professionals working in 25 offices worldwide.

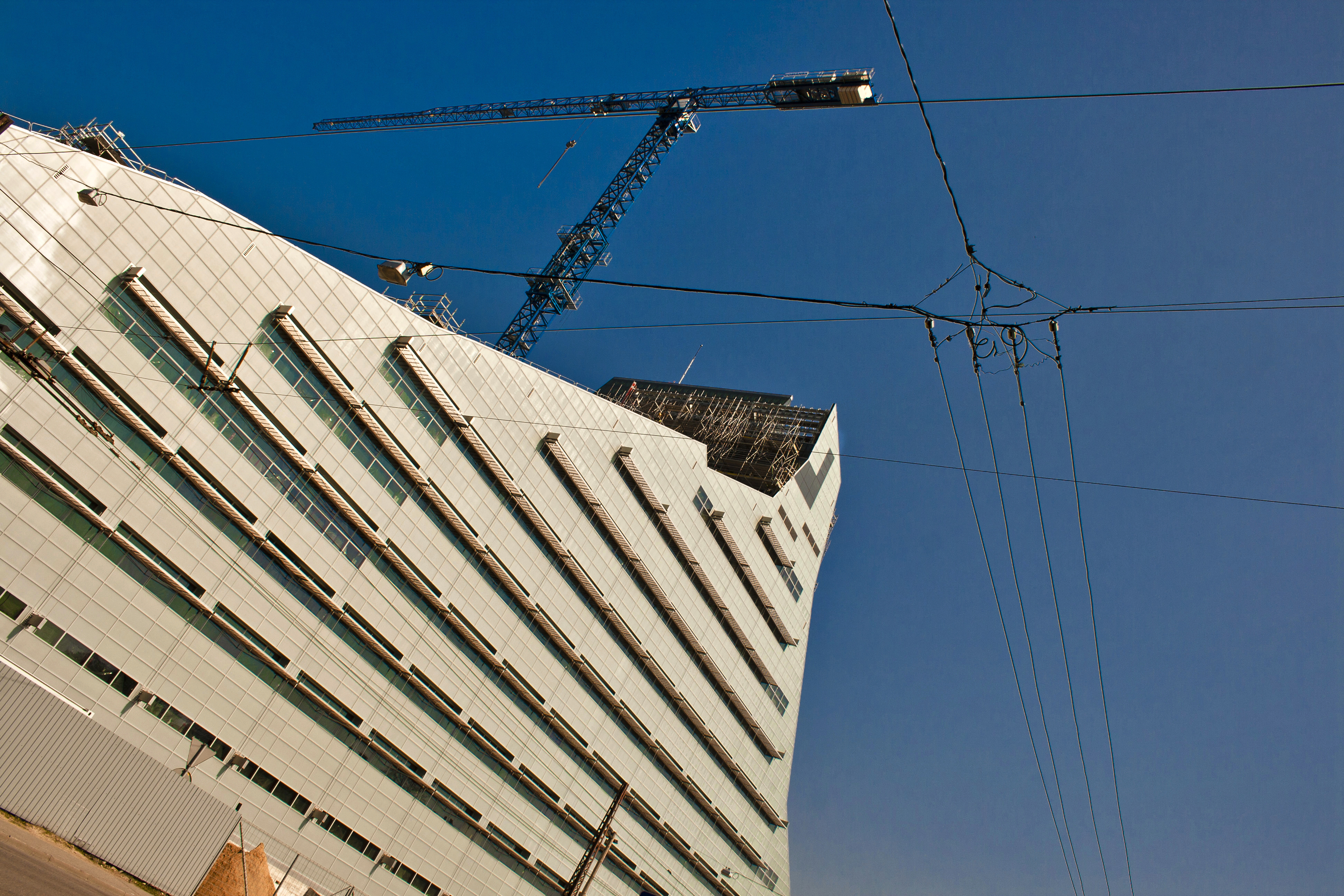
Hill provided CM services at the National Library of Latvia in Riga.

From 2002 to 2006, Hill's revenue rose from $73 million to $197 million, a 170% increase, with 55% percent of its revenue coming from Europe and the Middle East.

=== Becoming a public company via a reverse merger ===
Richter had always envisioned Hill as a public company. The company's financial difficulties of the mid-1990s, however, made the approach of going public through an IPO unattainable. In 2004 Arpeggio Acquisition Corporation of New York was formed in April as a "blank-check company"—meaning its business activities had not been determined. It was established for the sole purpose of buying a company within 18 to 24 months of its initial public offering.

On December 5, 2005, Arpeggio and Hill announced that they entered into a merger agreement. Under the terms of the agreement, Hill's shareholders received 14.5 million shares of the common stock of Arpeggio at closing and owned 63.6% of the combined entity. When the deal closed on June 28, 2006, Arpeggio changed its name to Hill International, Inc. and on June 29 began trading as HINT on Nasdaq.

When HINT began trading on Nasdaq on June 29, 2006, the price of HINT was $5.30 per share. At the end of the year the price was $7.15 per share. Hill achieved record revenue of $197 million with record net income of $11.3 million. Most of this was due to organic growth in the Project Management sector of the company. With the cash infusion from going public Hill could now begin a series of acquisitions and mergers that would grow the company as Richter had envisioned previously.

Hill made one immediate major acquisition in 2006 after going public – the purchase of J. R. Knowles (the largest construction claims company in the world) for $13 million. As a result, Hill assumed the title of the largest claims firm in the world. The Knowles acquisition also provided access to new markets in Southeast Asia, Australia, and Canada.

In 2007, Hill implemented its plan to acquire additional project management companies, notably KJM & Associates Ltd., Bellevue, WA. This move opened up new markets to Hill in the western U.S. This acquisition and continued organic growth resulted in record revenues of $290 million (with record net income of $14.1 million) in 2007. The stock soared to close the year at $14.17 per share.

== Move to the New York Stock Exchange ==
The company listed on the New York Stock Exchange (NYSE) in 2008. Now designated as HIL, it began trading on February 22, 2008, at $13.14 per share and six months later achieved its highest price ever at $19.30 per share on August 28, 2008. The company strategy continued to emphasize acquisitions to fuel and supplement its organic growth: Hill completed over 20 acquisitions of project management and claims consulting businesses worldwide, gaining entry/expanding into the United Kingdom, Spain, Mexico, Poland, Australia, Brazil, South Africa, and Turkey.

In the period 2008–2011, Hill acquired the following companies:

- John Shreeves Holdings, Ltd. London,
- (a majority stake in) Gerens Management Group, S.A., Madrid,
- Euromost, one of the leading project management firms in Poland,
- PCI, a firm that provided scheduling, construction claims, project management support, and software (for project management and scheduling) sales and support services throughout the western U.S.,
- Chitester, a firm that provided construction claims and dispute resolution services nationally, based in Tampa,
- Boyken International, Inc., a project management, cost estimating, and construction claims firm headquartered in Atlanta,
- McLachlan Lister, a consulting firm in Australia,
- TRS Consultants, Inc., is a construction management firm headquartered in San Ramon, California, and
- (a majority stake in) Engineering, S.A., one of the largest project management firms in Brazil.

Through these acquisitions Hill expanded the reach of its markets to include Latin America and the Caribbean, the western U.S., and continued expansion into central and eastern Europe.

=== The Arab Spring crisis ===
After the economic collapse of 2008–2009, HIL traded within a narrow range around $5 per share for eight years. For 30 years prior to going public, Hill was essentially a family-run business. Irvin Richter was in charge, with almost all stock controlled by his family. In 1995, Richter's son David joined Hill as vice president and General Counsel. David Richter became President of the Project Management Group in 2001, then served as the President of Hill from 2004 until August 11, 2016. He also served as the Chief Operating Officer from April 2004 to 2014, when he replaced his father as CEO.

Due to the civil unrest of the Arab Spring, which commenced in Libya in February 2011, Hill suspended its operations and demobilized practically all of its personnel from the country. Libya had been one of Hill's largest markets (accounting for almost 10% of backlog at Year End 2010). However, due to delays and lack of payments in Libya, Hill faced a considerable strain on liquidity.

Nevertheless, Hill recovered from the Libya loss in succeeding years. Revenues grew from 2012, driven mainly by organic growth in the Middle East. In addition, between 2012 and 2017, the firm acquired the following companies:

- Binnington Copeland Associates, a firm with offices in Cape Town and Johannesburg,
- Collaborative Partners of Boston,
- Cadogans of Scotland, and
- IMS, a Turkish project management firm.

=== Proxy battle ===
On May 4, 2015, DC Capital made public a letter to Hill's management offering to pay a minimum of $5.50 to take the company private. In their offer to Hill, DC referenced two concerns: disproportionate exposure in the Middle East, and the lack of sufficient fiscal discipline to maximize shareholder value, particularly excessive management compensation. Hill's board rejected this offer and implemented a poison pill, which was later rescinded. In December 2015, DC Capital partners proposed to acquire the company for a reduced offer of $4.75 per share, which still represented a premium in excess of 45%. Again, the board rejected the offer.

Soon after, Bulldog Investors disclosed a 5% position accumulated in Hill since the end of 2014. Most of the shares were bought in the two months leading up to the DC offer. They then continued buying after the offer became public and sought to put two directors on the company's board.

Management eventually won this proxy battle, and promised to cut costs, increase margins, and improve shareholder returns. Bulldog Investors believed these promises were not being met and in 2016 launched a second proxy battle. Hill eventually put Bulldog's nominees on the board. As part of that move, Irvin Richter fully retired, and Craig Martin, former president and CEO of Jacobs Engineering, eventually replaced David Richter as chairman.

During this time, Hill put the Claims Consulting Group up for sale. On December 20, 2016, Hill announced that it had entered into a definitive stock purchase agreement to sell its Construction Claims Group to Bridgepoint Development Capital, part of the international private equity group Bridgepoint, for $147 million in an all-cash transaction. The final deal closed on May 5, 2017. The former Hill Construction Consulting Group is now doing business as HKA.

=== Activist management ===
The Bulldog Investors proxy battle ended in the election of three independent directors to the board, replacing three tenured directors. After another director resigned, majority voting for the election of directors was implemented, the company committed to reduce its board to seven members over time, and an annual advisory vote on executive compensation was instituted.

After the sale of the Construction Claims Group was finalized in May 2017, David L. Richter, CEO since 2014, stepped down and left the firm. Named as interim CEO was Paul Evans, who joined Hill's board in August 2016 as one of three new members nominated by Hill activist investor Bulldog Investors. Evans had been Vice President, Chief Financial Officer, and Treasurer of MYR Group.

Following the sale of the Construction Claims Group, Hill underwent several major layoffs in staff. Hill was then unable to complete required quarterly operating statements since the first quarter of 2017. As a result of its failure to file its Quarterly Report on Form 10-Q for the fiscal quarter ended June 30, 2017 ("Form 10-Q") (or any subsequent Form 10-Qs), the NYSE informed the Company that, under the NYSE's rules, the company had six months from August 15, 2017, to file the Form 10-Q with the SEC. This extension was further extended to July 16, 2018. Hill was also late submitting its Form 10-Ks and annual report. Hill stated the reason for these delays was that it was continuing to compile information regarding, and complete the proper accounting and related tax treatment of, the sale of the Construction Claims Group which was completed in May 2017, and to assess the company's accounting for comprehensive income (loss) in conjunction with the accounting for the sale of the Construction Claims Group.

However, throughout this period of adjustment, Hill continued to win large international (11) and U.S. (8) contracts for its services.

=== Refocus on growth ===
Hill completed its restatement, became current with its filings, and named Raouf Ghali as the company's permanent CEO in late 2018. Entering 2019, and with the departure of the activist management team, the company re-focused on profitable growth and re-emphasized its core project management businesses, while also expanding into facilities management and advisory services.

During 2018, Hill announced several new project wins. These included providing program management and inspection services for the City of Cleveland on Dominion Energy’s $4 billion pipeline Infrastructure Replacement Program, selection by the European Bank for Reconstruction and Development to provide, as a leader of a joint venture, construction supervision services for the railway rehabilitation and upgrade of the Fushë Kosovë - Hani i Elezit railway line, and a contract to provide construction management services to Supernova Participações for the construction of Expo Park Pampulha, an $80 million multi-purpose complex in Brazil.

Hill also grew in Asia, acquiring the NEYO Group, a pan-India cost consultancy firm on June 30, 2021. The acquisition raised the company's in-country staff total more than 200 professionals. In addition, Hill now boasts six offices in India and has expanded the services the company can offer to clients throughout the Asia-Pacific region.

Notably, Hill announced the return of David Richter as a Board Observer on December 6, 2018.

== Acquisition by Global Infrastructure Solutions, Inc. ==
Global Infrastructure Solutions Inc. (GISI) and Hill International, Inc. announced their intent to conduct a strategic merger in August 2022. The merger presented enhanced opportunities for growth in global, for-fee infrastructure consulting markets. The merger was completed in December 2022 following regulatory approvals.

Final merger terms were US$3.40 per share. Hill shareholders representing approximately 72.9% of outstanding common shares approved the combination on November 2. As a GISI company, Hill continues to serve its clients under the Hill International brand as part of GISI's Consulting Group platform, along with sister companies The LiRo Group, GEI Consultants, J. Roger Preston Limited (JRP), Asia Infrastructure Solutions, Gafcon, and others. GISI Consulting Group is a global leader in program/project management and engineering consulting, delivering services in infrastructure, earth and environment, and global development segments.

Rick Newman, GISI President and CEO, said of the merger: “The GISI family of companies is well positioned to serve the needs of an expanding market requiring more technical and professional expertise than ever before. Hill’s uniqueness as a for-fee-only program management firm, combined with its technical and managerial expertise, makes the company a welcome addition to the GISI family. We’re excited to bring aboard the Hill team.”

Hill International CEO Raouf Ghali added, “Since our founding in 1976, Hill has grown into an industry-leading program, project, and construction management company. By joining the GISI family of companies, Hill is ready to continue to grow while enhancing the quality of our client services, thanks to GISI’s focus on long-term success.”

Following the merger with GISI, Hill International has increased profitability, streamlined operations, and enacted synergies with its sister companies.

=== Major wins and new additions ===
According to the company's public press releases, major new assignments since the company's merger include serving as project management oversight leader for Athens International Airport’s Airport Expansion Program, providing program management oversight services to the Port of Oakland in support of the Port’s $1.4 billion Capital Improvement Program, delivering project management and staff support services to deliver capital improvements for the Santa Clara Valley Transportation Authority's $2.6 billion improvement program, and delivering program general engineering consultant services for the multi-billion-dollar electrification of the Washington State Ferries system.

In addition, the firm has continued to deliver landmark projects in the Middle East, including Package 3 of the Riyadh Metro, the Cairo Monorail, and the Grand Egyptian Museum. The firm is also involved in delivering several of the Kingdom of Saudi Arabia's Vision 2030 programs, and is supporting major infrastructure assignments in Europe as well, such as the Ellinikon, in Athens, the largest urban regeneration project underway in Europe.

In addition, the company has brought aboard several new senior leaders. These include the hiring of Michael Fluehr as Chief Financial Officer in 2023, Michael Sokorai as Senior Vice President, Global Information Technology in 2024, and Mark Rynning as Chief Operating Officer, also in 2024.

As of January 2025, the company has approximately 4,100 employees in more than 100 offices all around the world. Engineering News-Record magazine ranks Hill as one of the largest construction management firms in the United States.
