= From Summetria to Symmetry: The Making of a Revolutionary Scientific Concept =

2008 history of mathematics book

- Cover page of the first edition
- Author: Giora Hon and Bernard R. Goldstein
- Series: Archimedes: New Studies in the History of Science and Technology
- Release number: 20
- Subject: History of science; Philosophy of science
- Publisher: Springer Science+Business Media
- Publication date: 2008
- Publication place: Dordrecht
- Media type: Print
- Pages: 335
- ISBN: 978-1-4020-8447-8

From Summetria to Symmetry: The Making of a Revolutionary Scientific Concept is a 2008 book written by historians of science Giora Hon and Bernard R. Goldstein. The book documents the history of the various concepts represented by the word symmetry starting from Plato the ancient Greek philosopher and Vitruvius the Roman architect, and ending with the German philosopher Immanuel Kant, the Swiss mathematician Leonhard Euler, and the French mathematician Adrien-Marie Legendre at the end of the 18th century.

The book argues that the key figure in revolutionizing the concept of symmetry was the mathematician, Adrien-Marie Legendre. The book makes clear the changing meaning of symmetry through the centuries and its historical analysis has been much cited, but its initial reception was mixed, particularly its claim for the importance of Legendre's role in defining the modern meaning of symmetry.

== Structure and topics ==
The book is an academic work in the history of science and is based on the analysis of primary sources. It begins with a 65-page introduction covering the historical, philosophical and historiographical background to the concept of symmetry. Following the introduction the book is split into two parts. Part I is entitled "Tradition: Ancient Perspectives and Their Survival in the Early Modern Era" and covers:

- The mathematical approach: the contributions of Plato, Euclid, Archimedes, Boethius, Robert Recorde, Nicole Oresme, Johannes Kepler, Galileo Galilei, Isaac Barrow and Isaac Newton.
- The aesthetic approach: the contributions of Plato, Aristotle, Geminus, Ptolemy, Vitruvius, Albrecht Dürer, Joachim Camerarius, Henry Wotton and Isaac Barrow.
- Aesthetics in Italian and French architecture: the contributions of the Italians Leon Battista Alberti, Sebastiano Serlio, Andrea Palladio and Vincenzo Scamozzi, the French Philibert Delorme, Louis Savot, Pierre Le Muet, Blaise Pascal, Claude Perrault, Augustin-Charles d'Aviler, Montesquieu and Denis Diderot, the English William Hogarth and Edmund Burke, and the German Christian Wolff.
- The early scientific approach: the contributions of Nicolaus Copernicus, Galileo Galilei, Johannes Kepler, René Descartes and Gottfried Wilhelm von Leibniz

Part II is entitled "The Path to Revolution: Symmetry as a Modern Scientific Concept" and covers:

- The treatment of symmetry in natural history including progress in botany, crystallography and zoology 1738–1815
- The contributions of Leonhard Euler and Immanuel Kant
- The contribution of Adrien-Marie Legendre in 1794 (termed "revolutionary" by the authors)
- New applications of symmetry in mathematics and physics 1788–1815

The authors describe the development of the use of the Greek term symmetria which expressed, over time, at least three different concepts: proportionality or commensurability in ancient sources, equivalence of sides in the seventeenth and eighteenth centuries, and the modern concept of symmetry, acquired at the end of the 18th century. In the introduction Hon and Goldstein criticised other historians and philosophers of science, specifically John J. Roche, Klaus Mainzer, and Katherine Brading and Elena Castellani, for taking an anachronistic approach to the history of symmetry.

Hon and Goldstein followed up the book with further research papers bolstering their arguments and responding to their critics.

== Audience ==
The book is aimed at historians and philosophers of science, mathematics, architecture, and aesthetics.

== Reception ==
Branko Mitrovic in a review in the Journal of the Society of Architectural Historians accepted the authors' argument that the development of the modern concept of symmetry can be attributed to Legendre, but he was sceptical of the evidence for the authors' view that this version of the concept (the equivalence between the left and right sides of an object) had not been articulated by the ancient philosophers or architects.

Hardy Grant in an extensive review in Historia Mathematica described the book as "flawed but fascinating". While commending their command of the sources and their "superb" scholarship, Grant criticises as unrealistic the authors' requirement for explicit textual references to the word symmetry to justify thinking that only then could the concept of symmetry have been known to the researchers of previous times. Grant also criticised in detail their identification of Legendre as the first to define symmetry in modern scientific terms. In conclusion, he stated that the book has "substantial virtues on the one hand, grave weaknesses on the other".

Joseph Dauben in a review for Aestimatio stated that "Undoubtedly the one aspect that will cause the greatest concern amongst historians of mathematics is the extent to which (or whether) the concept of symmetry can be considered 'revolutionary';" however Dauben did not express his personal view on the correctness of the main thesis of the book. Adhemar Bultheel in a review for the newsletter of the Belgian Mathematical Society stated that the authors make a "somewhat controversial and surprising claim: The modern (mathematical) notion of symmetry was not known to men until 1794", however Bultheel did not state his personal view of this proposition in the review.

György Darvas in a review for Centaurus took a more negative than positive view of the book. While acknowledging its "value as a handbook for finding written historical sources on the usage of the term symmetry" Darvas, who authored a monograph on symmetry in 2007, fundamentally disagreed with the authors' conclusions regarding the revolutionary nature of Legendre's use of the word symmetry.

Katherine Brading in a review for Metascience stated "I disagree with the framework of both the historical and the critical narrative offered by Hon and Goldstein" and gave detailed reasons for where she took issue with the authors' arguments, including her own contributions to the subject.

Michael Otte in a negative review for MathSciNet stated "The authors try everything to provide some plausibility to this enthusiastic exclamation [Legendre's revolutionary use of symmetry] sometimes in doubtful and wrongheaded ways". Otte specifically took issue with the authors' treatment of Kant's contribution.

== Influence ==
Later writers, whilst not necessarily accepting Hon and Goldstein's view that Legendre was the first to use the term symmetry in the modern sense, nevertheless accepted Hon and Goldstein's thesis that the word symmetry had the meaning of commensurability in ancient times and did not acquire its modern meaning until the latter part of the 18th century.

Čelkytė considers Hon and Goldstein's book to be a monograph on functional aesthetics. O'Loughlin and McCallum cite Hon and Goldstein to support their statement that symmetry is relatively unimportant as an aesthetic criterion.

The book has become a standard reference for how the word symmetry was used before the 19th century.
