= Gouldstone =

Gouldstone is a surname. Notable people with the surname include:

- Harry Gouldstone (born 2001), English cricketer
- Mark Gouldstone (born 1963), English cricketer

== See also ==
- Goldstone (surname)
- Henry Goulstone
- John Goulstone Lewis
- Kerry Goulstone
