= Goldson =

Goldson is a surname. Notable people with the surname include:

- Annie Goldson, New Zealand film academic
- Connor Goldson (born 1992), English football defender
- Dashon Goldson (born 1984), American football safety
- Kadrian Goldson (born 1997), Jamaican track and field athlete
- Kimberly Goldson, American fashion designer
- Philip Goldson (1923–2001), Belizean newspaper editor, activist and politician

== See also ==
- Goldson, Oregon, unincorporated community in Lane County, Oregon, United States
- Philip S. W. Goldson International Airport (IATA: BZE, ICAO: MZBZ), an airport that serves Belize City
- Goldston (disambiguation)
