= Goldstone =

Goldstone may refer to:

== Places and buildings ==
- Goldstone, Shropshire, a small village in Shropshire, England
- Goldstone Ground, the former stadium of Brighton & Hove Albion football club in England
- Goldstone Primary School, a primary school in Hove, England
- Goldstone Lake, a dry lake in the Mojave Desert, California
- Goldstone, California, a ghost town near Goldstone Lake
- Goldstone Gts Airport, private airport near Goldstone Lake, California
- Goldstone Deep Space Communications Complex, a network of radio antennae near Goldstone Lake, California
  - Goldstone Solar System Radar, a radar system at the Deep Space Communications Complex

== Physics and astronomy ==
- Goldstone boson, certain bosons in particle and condensed-matter physics
- Goldstone's theorem, a theorem examining a spontaneously broken continuous symmetry
- Goldstone Catena, a valley on Mercury
- Goldstone (crater), crater on Mars
- 4433 Goldstone, a main-belt asteroid

== Other uses ==
- Goldstone Report, a 2009 United Nations fact-finding mission
- Goldstone (glass), a gemstone simulant
- Goldstone (band), a British girl group
- Goldstone (film), a 2016 Australian film
- Goldstone Tires, a tire manufacturer based in Tehran, Iran

== See also ==
- Goldstone (surname)
