= Goldstine =

Goldstine is a surname. Notable people with the surname include:

- Adele Goldstine (1920–1964), American computer programmer
- Herman Goldstine (1913–2004), American mathematician and computer scientist
- Israel Goldstine (1898–1953), New Zealand politician
- Susan Goldstine, American mathematician

== See also ==
- Goldstein (disambiguation)
