= Martha Goldstein =

American harpsichordist and pianist (1919–2014)

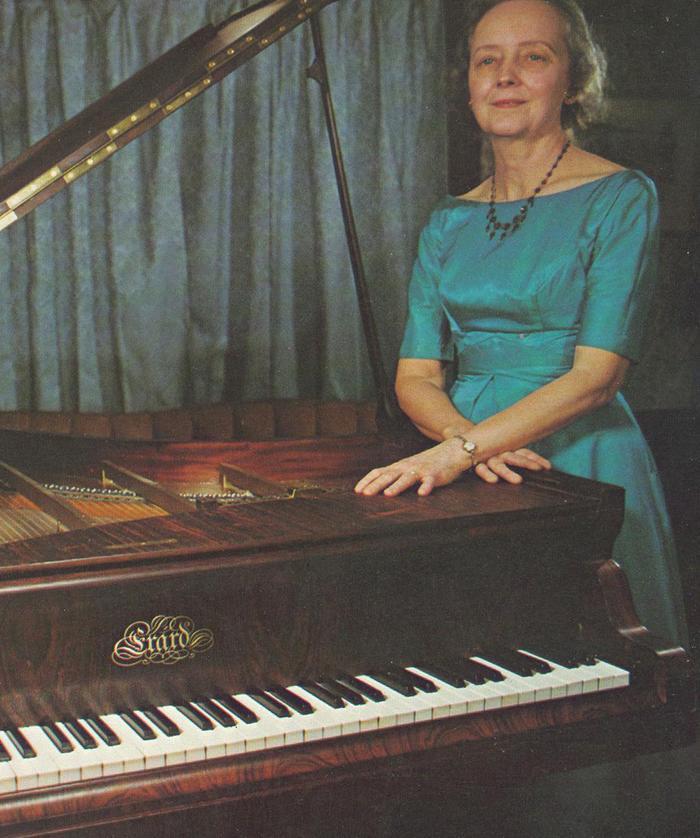
- Goldstein standing behind an 1851 Erard piano, in 1974
- Born: Martha Svendsen; June 10, 1919; Baltimore, Maryland, U.S.
- Died: February 14, 2014 (aged 94); Seattle, Washington, U.S.
- Occupations: Harpsichordist and pianist
- Spouse: Allen A. Goldstein

Martha Goldstein (born Martha Svendsen; June 10, 1919 – February 14, 2014) was an American harpsichordist and pianist, who gave concerts in the United States, North Africa, the Middle East, and Europe. She performed works by George Frideric Handel, Frédéric Chopin, Georg Philipp Telemann, Franz Liszt, Ferruccio Busoni, Johann Sebastian Bach, and others.

== Biography ==
Born in Baltimore, Maryland, Goldstein was trained at the Peabody Conservatory and the Juilliard School and studied with Audrey Plitt, Eliza Woods, James Friskin and Mieczysław Munz. She taught at the Peabody Conservatory for 20 years and at the Cornish College of the Arts. She also performed as a guest artist with the Soni Ventorum Wind Quintet, wind quintet-in-residence at the University of Washington School of Music since 1968.

Many of Goldstein's recordings were first released on LP by Pandora Records, which was founded in 1973 and active for more than ten years. The company went out of business with the advent of the CD. The entire archive of recordings is now available for download without restriction and can be found at many download sites, including Wikipedia (see Commons:Category:Martha Goldstein). Often her recordings reflect historically informed performance, employing original period instruments and tunings.

She died in Seattle, Washington on February 14, 2014. She had two sons, one of whom predeceased her, and was also survived by her husband of more than fifty years, Allen A. Goldstein (University of Washington Professor Emeritus of Mathematics, who died on January 21, 2022), four stepchildren, and several grandchildren and great-grandchildren.

== Commercial recordings ==
Hungarian Rhapsody No. 2 by Franz Lizst
Performed by Martha Goldstein on an 1851 Erard piano

- The Italian Harpsichord. Pandora Records, cat. no. PAN 101.
- Bach: Flute sonatas. Complete and Authentic Works from the Neue Bach Gesellschaft. Alex Murray (Baroque flute); Martha Goldstein (harpsichord). Pandora Records (1974) cat. no. PAN 104.
- Chopin: Études, Op. 10; Études, Op. 25. Pandora Records, cat. no. PAN 107.
- Bach: Flute Sonatas. Incomplete and Controversial Sonatas. Alex Murray (Baroque flute); Martha Goldstein (harpsichord). Pandora Records, cat. no. PAN 105.
- Bach / Martha Goldstein - The Sound of the Keyboard Lute. Pandora Records, cat. no. PAN 111.
- Brahms: Waltzes. Pandora Records (1987), cat. no. PAN 119.
- Bach: Music for Solo Traverso, Volume I. Alex Murray (Baroque flute); Martha Goldstein (harpsichord). Pandora Records, cat. no. PC 176.

== See also ==
- Sonata in B minor for flute or recorder and harpsichord
- File:Bach - Flute Sonata Bmin - 1. Andante - Traverso and Harpsichord.ogg (Wikipedia Featured audio file)
