= Reuben Goldstein Edwards =

British businessman

Reuben Goldstein, (c. 1862 – 1 December 1943), who later changed his name to Reuben Goldstein Edwards and subsequently Reuben George Edwards, was the proprietor of Edwards' Harlene, manufacturer of hair restorers, colourants and other hair products for both men and women, from which he made a fortune. Goldstein and his wife founded and helped fund the Edith Edward's tuberculosis preventorium at Papworth Hospital.

Goldstein was born in Whitechapel around the end of 1862 to Israel and Henrietta Goldstein who were originally from Poland and Germany. He changed his name to Reuben Goldstein Edwards in 1894 and during the late 1920s became Reuben George Edwards. He married Edith Constance Newton (1880–1951), whose family had changed its name from its original Nathan, at the West London Synagogue on Tuesday 26 July 1898. They had three children, Edna Constance (1899–1914), Aimee (1901–1983) and Joseph Reuben (1914–1994).

By the mid-1880s, Goldstein had founded the Edwards' Harlene Co., manufacturers of hair products, initially of 5 New Oxford Street and by late 1891 of 95 and 96 High Holborn, London. Harlene products were promoted through a series of large newspaper advertisements that made extravagant claims. One shows a drawing of a man with impossibly luxuriant dark hair, beard and handlebar moustache, and a woman with long flowing curly locks, claiming “Edwards' Harlene positively forces luxuriant hair, whiskers and moustachios to grow heavily within a few weeks without injury to the skin no matter what the age. The world-renowned remedy for baldness, from cause arising. As a producer of whiskers and moustachios it has never been equalled. As a curer of weak or thin eyelashes, or restoring grey hair to its original colour, it never fails.”

Related to the death of their first child at a young age, to whom they erected an elaborate memorial in Golders Green Jewish Cemetery, they founded the Edith Edward's Preventorium at Papworth Hospital, Cambridgeshire, for the treatment of tuberculosis. Their fundraising events such as a 'Happy Memories Ball' were mentioned in several Court Circulars during the 1930s.

Reuben George Edwards of Flat 61, Grosvenor House, Park Lane, died on 1 December 1943 leaving £86,577. Edith Constance Edwards M.B.E. of Grosvenor House, Park Lane, died on 29 January 1951 leaving £9,459.
