= Justin Goldston =

American academic

Justin Lee Goldston
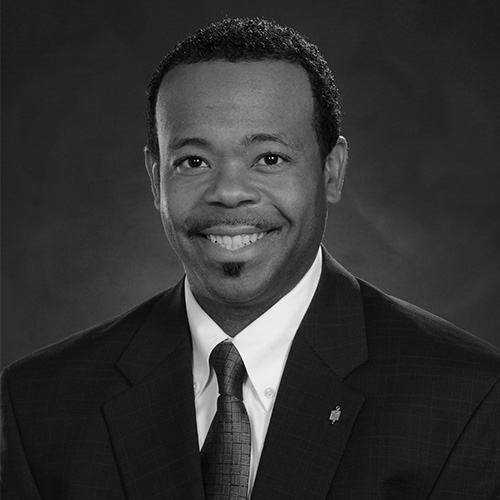
- Education: North Carolina Agricultural and Technical State University; Penn State University
- Occupations: Professor & Author
- Notable work: Artificial Intelligence, Blockchain, and the Integration of these Technologies
- Website: https://justingoldston.com

Justin Lee Goldston is an American academic at Penn State University. He assisted in the development of the Master's program in Supply Chain Management at Georgetown University.

== Education ==
Goldston holds B.S. degree in Supply Chain Management from North Carolina Agricultural and Technical State University, then master's degree in Supply Chain Management from Penn State University and PhD in Leadership and Organizational Change.

== Career ==
Goldston began his career as a management consultant for organizations such as Iptor Supply Chain Systems, formerly International Business Systems and Infor since before he joins his higher education. He spent the most of his career implementing Enterprise Resource Planning (ERP) systems within the industry, he transferred that experience to higher education where he wrote his doctoral thesis on critical success factors that was later published into a book entitled "Critical Success Factors in Enterprise Resource Planning Implementation in U. S. Manufacturing.

Goldston's research was centered around ERP systems and continues to present current researches on emerging technologies such as Artificial Intelligence, Blockchain, and the integration of these technologies, at various international conferences. He is an author of the International Supply Chain Education Alliance (ISCEA) Certified Sustainable Supply Chain Professional course.

== Selected publications ==
- Goldston, Justin Lee (2019). Critical success factors in enterprise resource planning implementation in U.S. manufacturing. Sandston/Richmond, VA. ISBN 978-1-948149-09-9. OCLC 1232180113.
- Goldston, J., Chaffer, T. J., & Martinez, G. (2022). The Metaverse as the Digital Leviathan: A Case Study of Bit. Country. Journal of Applied Business & Economics, 24(2), 40-59.
- Anoop, V. S., & Goldston, J. (2022). Decentralized finance to hybrid finance through blockchain: a case-study of acala and current. Journal of Banking and Financial Technology, 1-7.
- Chaffer, T. J., & Goldston, J. (2022). On the Existential Basis of Self-Sovereign Identity and Soulbound Tokens: An Examination of the “Self” in the Age of Web3. Journal of Strategic Innovation and Sustainability Vol, 17(3), 1-9.
- Anoop, V. S., Asharaf, S., Goldston, J., & Williams, S. (Eds.). (2022). Blockchain for Industry 4.0: Blockchain for Industry 4.0: Emergence, Challenges, and Opportunities.
