= Louis-Albert Carvin =

French sculptor

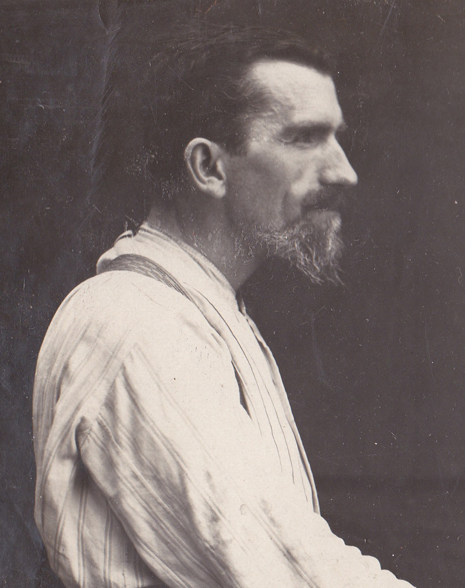
Louis-Albert Carvin

Louis-Albert Carvin (1875–1951) was a French sculptor, primarily an animalier.
