= Marcus Goldstein =

Marcus S. Goldstein (August 22, 1906 – December 1, 1997) was an American dentist and public health analyst who was one of the forefathers of dental anthropology. He was an active researcher with a broad interest in the field of anthropology, writing over one hundred scientific publications during his lifetime.

Born in Philadelphia, Pennsylvania, Goldstein received a bachelor's and master's degree in anthropology from George Washington University, and his doctorate from Columbia. His professional career in anthropology began in 1927, when he obtained a position as aide to Ales Hrdlicka in the U.S. National Museum Division of Physical Anthropology. During World War II, he worked for the U.S. Office of Strategic Services, and in 1946, joined the U.S. Public Health Service as an analyst.

His government career included posts at the Division of Public Health Methods, National Institutes of Mental Health Administration on Aging, and the Office of Research and Statistics in the Social Security Administration, from which he retired in 1971.

As an active researcher, Goldstein's publications include a number of key works on dental variation and pathology, growth, development, aging, and skeletal pathology in past populations of Israel.

Following his retirement, Goldstein, and his wife, Lea, immigrated to Israel, where he joined Tel Aviv University and played an important role in developing research in the newly formed Department of Anatomy and Anthropology. Goldstein was also responsible for founding the "Israel Association of Anthropology", which now has well over 150 members. He brought together scientists from archaeology, biological, and social anthropology — no easy task in a country where the three disciplines are taught in separate faculties. In 1987, he was honored with that Association's Distinguished Service Award.

Goldstein summed up his career in his monograph, "An Odyssey in Anthropology and Public Health" (1995), in which he gave a warm portrayal of the people who had helped him in his works. He died in Jerusalem, Israel, aged 91.

== Publications ==
Goldstein's major publications include:

- "The Cusps in the Mandibular Molar Teeth of the Eskimo," American Journal of Physical Anthropology (1931, 16);
- Demographic and Bodily Changes in Descendants of Mexican Immigrants with Comparable Data on Parents and Children in Mexico (1943);
- "Physical Status of Men Examined through Selective Service in World War II", Public Health Reports (1951, 66);
- "Some Vital Statistics Based on Skeletal Material", Human Biology (1953, 25);
- "Longevity and Health Status of Whites and Nonwhites in the United States", Journal of the National Medical Association (1954, 46); and
- "Theory of Survival of the Unfit", Journal of the National Medical Association (1955, 47).
