= Bruce Goldstone =

American writer

Bruce Goldstone is an American children’s book author and illustrator.

Goldstone grew up in Ohio. In addition to his children’s book work, he also writes textbooks and is a graphic designer for a theater company.

His New York Times-bestselling book Great Estimations and its sequel, Greater Estimations, teach children the skill of visually estimating large quantities.

== Bibliography ==
- The Beastly Feast, illustrations by Blair Lent, Henry Holt and Co., 1998
- Ten Friends, illustrations by Heather Cahoon, Henry Holt and Co., 2001
- Bip in a Book, written with Marcel Marceau, photographs by Steven Rothfeld; Stewart, Tabori & Chang, 2001
- Why Is Blue Dog Blue?, written with George Rodrigue, illustrations by George Rodrigue; Stewart, Tabori & Chang, 2001
- A Gnome's Christmas, illustrations by Rien Poortvliet, Harry N. Abrams, Inc., 2004
- Great Estimations, Henry Holt and Co., 2006
- Greater Estimations, Henry Holt and Co., 2008
- 100 Ways to Celebrate 100 Days, Henry Holt and Co., 2010
- Awesome Autumn, Henry Holt and Co., 2012
- That's a Possibility!, Henry Holt and Co., 2013
- I See a Pattern Here, Henry Holt, 2015
- Wonderful Winter, Henry Holt, 2016
- Spectacular Spring, Henry Holt, 2018
- Super Summer, Henry Holt, 2019
