= Gary Goldstone =

South African soccer player

Gary Alexander Goldstone (born 24 July 1976 in Durban) is a South African soccer player who plays as a defender for Premier Soccer League club Bloemfontein Celtic.

- Previous clubs: Cherrians Football Club, Maritzburg United, AmaZulu, Ajax Cape Town, Kaizer Chiefs
