= Chris Goldstein =

American radio personality

Chris Goldstein is an American radio personality. He is the producer and host of "Active Voice Radio". Based in New Mexico for 10 years, he has returned to his home state of New Jersey.

Goldstein has worked in non-profit advocacy, aviation, public radio and eBroadcasting. He served on the board of directors for the Northern New Mexico Radio Foundation for four years. Goldstein also co-founded NNMRF. His radio show, Active Voice Radio, appears on KSFR 101.1FM Santa Fe Public Radio and is distributed weekly to various stations via The Public Radio Exchange. Goldstein was the voice for the National Organization for the Reform of Marijuana Laws (NORML) weekly broadcast report and daily podcast until February 2008. He is also a spokesman for the Coalition for Medical Marijuana New Jersey.

== See also ==
- KSFR-FM
