= Goldstone Gts Airport =

Goldstone Gts
- IATA: none; ICAO: none; LID: 00CA

Summary
- Airport type: Private
- Owner: US Govt / NASA
- Location: North of Barstow, CA
- Elevation AMSL: 3,038 ft / 926 m
- Coordinates: 35°21′19″N 116°53′05″W
- Interactive map of Goldstone Gts

Runways
Direction	Length		Surface
Direction	ft	m	Surface
04-22	6,000	1,829	asphalt

Goldstone Gts Airport (FAA LID: 00CA) is a private airport 28 miles north of Barstow, California. Permission is required for landing. The airport is unattended by ATC, and is in the Los Angeles Center / Riverside FSS.

== Resources ==
- Resources for this airport:
  - FAA airport information for 00CA
  - AirNav airport information for 00CA
  - FlightAware airport information and live flight tracker
  - SkyVector aeronautical chart for 00CA
