= Goldstone Lake =

Dry lake in the state of California, United States

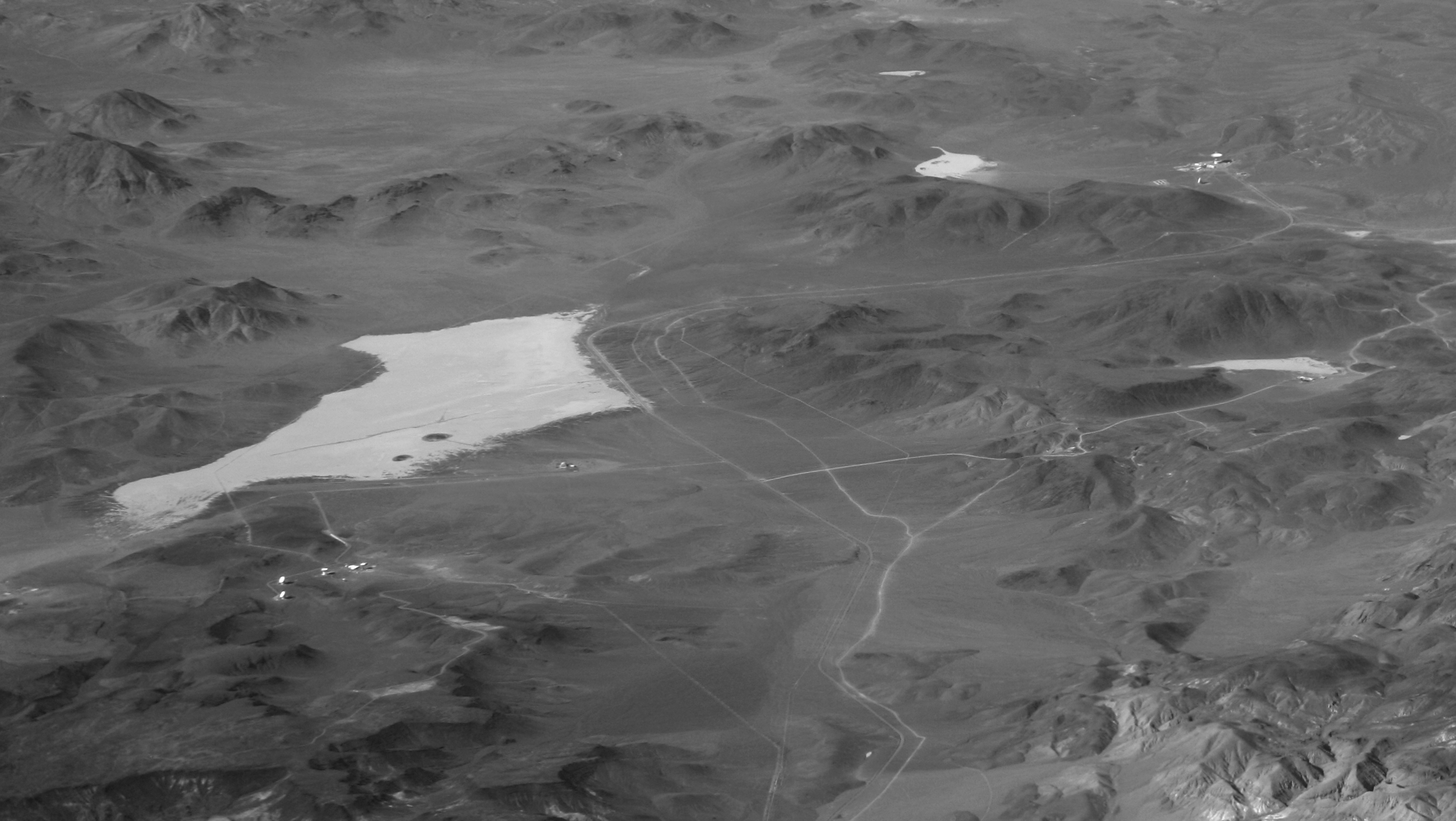
- Goldstone Lake (light-colored feature at left)

- Location within California Location within the United States
- Location: Mojave Desert; San Bernardino County, California
- Coordinates: 35.3641°N 116.8965°W
- Lake type: Endorheic basin
- Primary outflows: Terminal
- Basin countries: United States
- Max. length: 5 km (3.1 mi)
- Max. width: 3 km (1.9 mi)
- Shore length^{1}: 15 km (9.3 mi)
- Surface elevation: 919 m (3,015 ft)
- References: U.S. Geological Survey Geographic Names Information System: Goldstone Lake
- ^{1} Shore length is not a well-defined measure.

Goldstone Lake is a dry lake in the Mojave Desert of San Bernardino County, California, 56 km (35 mi) northeast of Barstow. The lake is approximately 5 km (3.1 mi) long and 3 km (1.9 mi) at its widest point.

Goldstone Lake is on federal lands within the borders of the Fort Irwin Military Reservation, southwest of the Granite Mountains.

== See also ==
- List of lakes in California
