= Bernard R. Goldstein =

American historian

Bernard Raphael Goldstein (born January 29, 1938) is a historian of science and professor emeritus at the University of Pittsburgh. Goldstein published on the history of astronomy in medieval Islamic and Jewish civilization and early modern times.

== Selected publications ==
- The Astronomy of al-Biṭrūjī
- The Astronomy of Levi ben Gerson (1288–1344), Springer-Verlag, 1985
- "Theological Foundations of Kepler’s Astronomy," Osiris 16 (2001) (with Peter Barker)
- "Astronomy in the Iberian Peninsula: Abraham Zacut and the Transition from Manuscript to Print," Transactions of the American Philosophical Society 90.2 (2000) (with José Chabás)
- Ibn Mu'adh's "(1079) Treatise On Twilight and the Height of the Atmosphere" Archive for History of Exact Sciences Vol. 17, No. 2 (21.VII.1977), pp. 97-118 (22 pages) JSTOR. (Treatise On Twilight was printed by F Risner in Opticae Thesaurus (1572) as Liber de crepusculis, but attributed to Alhazen rather than Ibn Mu'adh.)
- Hon, Giora; Goldstein, Bernard R. (2008). From Summetria to Symmetry: The Making of a Revolutionary Scientific Concept. Archimedes New Studies in the History and Philosophy of Science and Technology. Vol. 20. Dordrecht: Springer. doi:10.1007/978-1-4020-8448-5. ISBN 978-1-4020-8447-8.
