= Chaim Itsl Goldstein =

Chaim Itsl Goldstein (or Charles, also written as Hayim Itsl Goldshteyn; born 1900) was a Polish writer.

Goldstein was in Warsaw, Congress Poland in Russian Empire. He was a worker and a leftist activist. He emigrated to Paris in 1930. During World War II, Goldstein was arrested and transported to Auschwitz concentration camp. In October 1943, he was taken to Warsaw, where he worked in the Warsaw Ghetto ruins after the unsuccessful Warsaw Ghetto Uprising. Goldstein was liberated during Warsaw Uprising and participated in it. After the uprising's failure, he hid in a bunker in the destroyed and deserted city. His memoirs Zibn in bunḳer (Eng. Seven in the bunker, known also as The Bunker) have been published in Yiddish, Hebrew, English, French and Polish.

== See also ==
- Władysław Szpilman

== Sources ==
- Reuben Ainsztein: "The Warsaw Ghetto Revolt", New York:Holocaust Library, 1979
