= Allen A. Goldstein =

American mathematician and astrophysicist (1925–2022

- Born: January 7, 1925; Baltimore, Maryland, U.S.
- Died: January 21, 2022 (aged 97); Seattle, Washington, U.S.
- Known for: cutting-plane method
- Spouse: Martha Goldstein

Academic background
- Education: Peabody Conservatory; St. John's College; Georgetown University
- Thesis: On the reduction of photoelectric measurements of a total solar eclipse (1954)

Academic work
- Institutions: Convair; University of Texas at Austin; University of Washington

Allen Abbey Goldstein (January 7, 1925 – January 21, 2022) was an American mathematician and astrophysicist who worked at the University of Washington for most of his career. He is known for developing several methods in convex optimization and mathematical analysis, including the Kelley-Cheney-Goldstein method (an example of cutting-plane methods) for optimizing nondifferentiable functions, which he developed along with Ward Cheney. His other well-known contribution to optimization theory is the development of the Goldstein condition in line search methods which, along with the Wolfe conditions, is an important extension to the Armijo rule.

== Education and career ==
Goldstein was born in Baltimore, Maryland and studied flute at Peabody Conservatory on a scholarship and received a diploma for flute performance in 1943. He then attended St. John's College in Maryland, where he received a B.A. in liberal arts in 1947. He received an M.S. in astronomy in 1952 from Georgetown University. His master's thesis was on the collision events in three-body problem. During this time, he also worked part time at the Applied Mathematics Laboratory of the National Bureau of Standards. Goldstein continued his study at Georgetown for the Ph.D. program in astronomy with a minor in mathematics. He received his Ph.D. degree in 1954, with a thesis titled On the reduction of photoelectric measurements of a total solar eclipse.

After graduation, Goldstein initially worked as a design specialist for Convair Astronautics, a division of General Dynamics based in San Diego, California from 1955 to 1960. During this time, he also taught mathematics at University of California, Los Angeles as a part-time lecturer. He then moved to Massachusetts Institute of Technology, where he worked as a research associate until 1963, when he became an associate professor of mathematics and computer science at the University of Texas at Austin. Goldstein moved to Seattle in 1964 and joined the University of Washington as an associate professor in mathematics and became a full professor in 1965. He was also appointed professor at the Department of Computer Science at the University of Washington in the early days of its history. Goldstein remained at the university for the next decades of his academic career.

In 1957, Goldstein was elected a member of the Mathematical Association of America.

Goldstein married Martha Svedsen, who was a harpsichordist and also studied at the Peabody Conservatory. In 1973, Goldstein started an LP record company called Pandora Records and collaborated with his wife on music recording. The company existed for ten years.

== Selected publications ==
- Cheney, E. W.; Goldstein, A. A. (1959). "Newton's method for convex programming and Tchebycheff approximation". Numerische Mathematik. 1 (1): 253–268. doi:10.1007/BF01386389. ISSN 0029-599X.
- Cheney, Ward; Goldstein, Allen A. (1959). "Proximity Maps for Convex Sets". Proceedings of the American Mathematical Society. 10 (3). American Mathematical Society: 448–450. doi:10.2307/2032864. ISSN 0002-9939.
- Goldstein, A. A. (1964). "Convex programming in Hilbert space". Bulletin of the American Mathematical Society. 70 (5): 709–710. doi:10.1090/S0002-9904-1964-11178-2. ISSN 1088-9485.
- Goldstein, A. A. (1965). "On Steepest Descent". Journal of the Society for Industrial and Applied Mathematics Series A Control. 3 (1): 147–151. doi:10.1137/0303013. ISSN 0887-4603.
- Goldstein, Allen A. (1967). Constructive real analysis. Harper & Row. ISBN 978-0-06-356184-7.
