= Carvin Goldstone =

South African comedian

Carvin H Goldstone (born in 1984, in Durban) is an internationally recognised South African comedian, and the 2018 South African Comic of the year and 2018 Flying Solo Comedian of the year.

== Performances ==
As a professional master of ceremonies and corporate entertainer, Goldstone has hosted and performed at events for companies, including Investec, MultiChoice, Nedbank, WBHO, KPMG ,] UKZN and Old Mutual.

He has performed at every major comedy Comedy Festival in South Africa and many around the world

== Festivals ==
- Cape Town Funny Festival
- Nandos International Comedy Fest
- Johannesburg International Comedy Festival
- Melbourne International Comedy Festival
- Magners Asia International Comedy Festival
- Stand Up Dubai
- Mad About Comedy Indonesia
- Perth Comedy Lounge
- Stand Up Doha

He was also the Graca Comedy Showdown, 2011, Winner.

== Comedy Specials ==
- 2011 No Swearing
- 2012 iBruino
- 2015 Coloured President
- 2016 Best of Carvin H Goldstone
- 2017 Culture Shock
- 2018 The Other South African Comedian
- 2019 Life Stories
