= Katherine Brading =

Philosopher and historian of science

- Born: 1970 (age 55–56)
- Occupations: Philosopher of science, historian of science
- Known for: Work on symmetry in physics, Noether’s theorem, Émilie du Châtelet
- Title: Professor of Philosophy

Academic background
- Education: King's College London (BSc, Physics and Philosophy); University of Oxford (St Hugh's College) (D.Phil.)
- Thesis: Symmetries, conservation laws, and Noether's variational problem (2001)

Academic work
- Institutions: University of Notre Dame (until 2017); Duke University (2017–present)
- Notable works: Émilie Du Châtelet and the Foundations of Physical Science (2019); Symmetries in Physics: Philosophical Reflections (2003, co-editor); Philosophical Mechanics in the Age of Reason (2023, coauthor)

Katherine Astrid Brading (born 1970) is a philosopher of science and historian of science whose works have concerned theoretical physics, symmetry, and Émilie du Châtelet. Educated in England, she works in the US as a professor of philosophy at Duke University.

== Education ==
Brading earned a bachelor's degree in physics and philosophy from King's College London in 1992. She completed her doctorate (D.Phil.) at St Hugh's College, Oxford in 2001, with the dissertation Symmetries, conservation laws, and Noether's variational problem.

In 2017 she moved from a position as professor of philosophy at the University of Notre Dame to her present position at Duke University. Since 2022 she has chaired the Department of Philosophy at Duke.

== Books ==
Brading is the author of Émilie Du Châtelet and the Foundations of Physical Science (Routledge, 2019). With Elena Castellani, she is co-editor of Symmetries in Physics: Philosophical Reflections (Cambridge University Press, 2003). She is the coauthor of Philosophical Mechanics in the Age of Reason (with Marius Stan, Oxford University Press, 2023).
