= Phillip Goldstein (investor) =

- Born: Brooklyn, New York
- Education: University of Southern California City College of New York
- Occupations: Co-founder and partner, bulldog investors

Phillip "Phil" Goldstein is an American investor, former civil engineer, and manager of the hedge fund Bulldog Investors, known for its value-driven investment strategy, its activist investment campaigns and its focus on closed-end mutual funds.

== Early life and education ==
Goldstein was born in Brooklyn, New York in 1945. He decided as a child that he wanted to become an engineer, when his patriotism was inspired by the launch of the Sputnik. He attended the University of Southern California, earning a Bachelor of Science in Engineering in 1966. He then returned to the East Coast to pursue a master's degree in engineering from the City College of New York, which he completed in 1968.

== Career ==
Goldstein spent the first 25 years of his career as a civil engineer for the City of New York, working on projects such as the maintenance and improvement of the Brooklyn Bridge's roadway. In the 1970s he also used his proficiency with math in the game of blackjack, and even considered a career as a professional gambler until he came across a book, "How the Experts Beat the Market," by Thomas C. Noddings. In the book, Noddings, also a former engineer, explains how a mathematically inclined investor can uncover and profit from various market inefficiencies.

Over time, this approach led Goldstein to employ the principal of value investing with a particular emphasis on closed-end funds, in his personal investing. In 1989, he met former Dean Witter associate Steven Samuels at a conference on closed-end funds. Samuels introduced Goldstein to some potential investment clients, and in 1992 the two started Bulldog Investors with $700,000. Andrew Dakos and Rajeev Das later joined as partners.

By 1996, Goldstein and his partners decided to take a more activist approach to some of the fund's investing, with a particular emphasis on liquidity events such as asset sales.

In 2009, Goldstein and Bulldog Investors ran a proxy contest to elect a new board of directors to Insured Municipal Income Fund, and later renamed it Special Opportunities Fund (NYSE: SPE). Special Opportunities Fund is now managed by Bulldog Investors, along with a group of private funds.

Goldstein and Bulldog Investors remain value-centric, employing a variety of value-oriented investing strategies, and regularly investing in closed-end mutual funds when there is a significant gap between the fund's market value and its net asset value (NAV), or liquidation value. Oftentimes the strategy then includes converting the fund to an open-ended one, or simply liquidating the funds' assets and returning them to shareholders.

== Board seats ==
Goldstein is a member of the board of directors of Imperial Holdings (NYSE: IFT), the Mexico Equity and Income Fund (NYSE: MXE), ASA Ltd. (NYSE: ASA), the Special Opportunities Fund (NYSE: SPE) and MVC Capital (NYSE: MVC).
