= Virtus et Fraternitas Medal =

Polish state decoration

Virtus et Fraternitas Medal Medal Virtus et Fraternitas
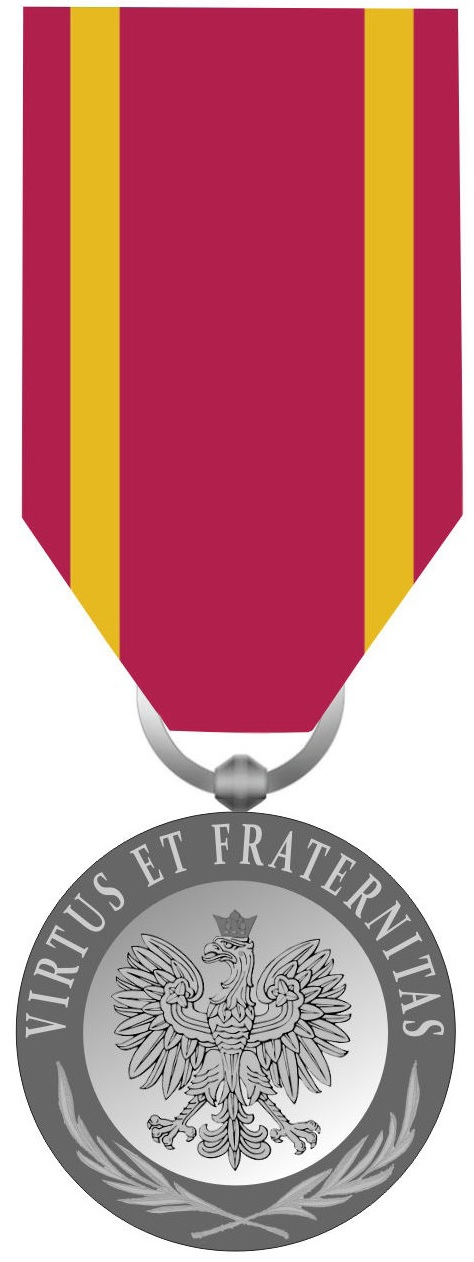
- Obverse
- Type: Commemorative decoration of merit
- Country: Poland
- Presented by: the President of Poland
- Status: Currently awarded
- Established: 9 November 2017
- First award: 19 June 2019
- Ribbon of the cross

Precedence
- Next (higher): Cross of Freedom and Solidarity
- Next (lower): Gold Cross of Merit
- Related: Order of the Cross of Independence; Cross of Independence

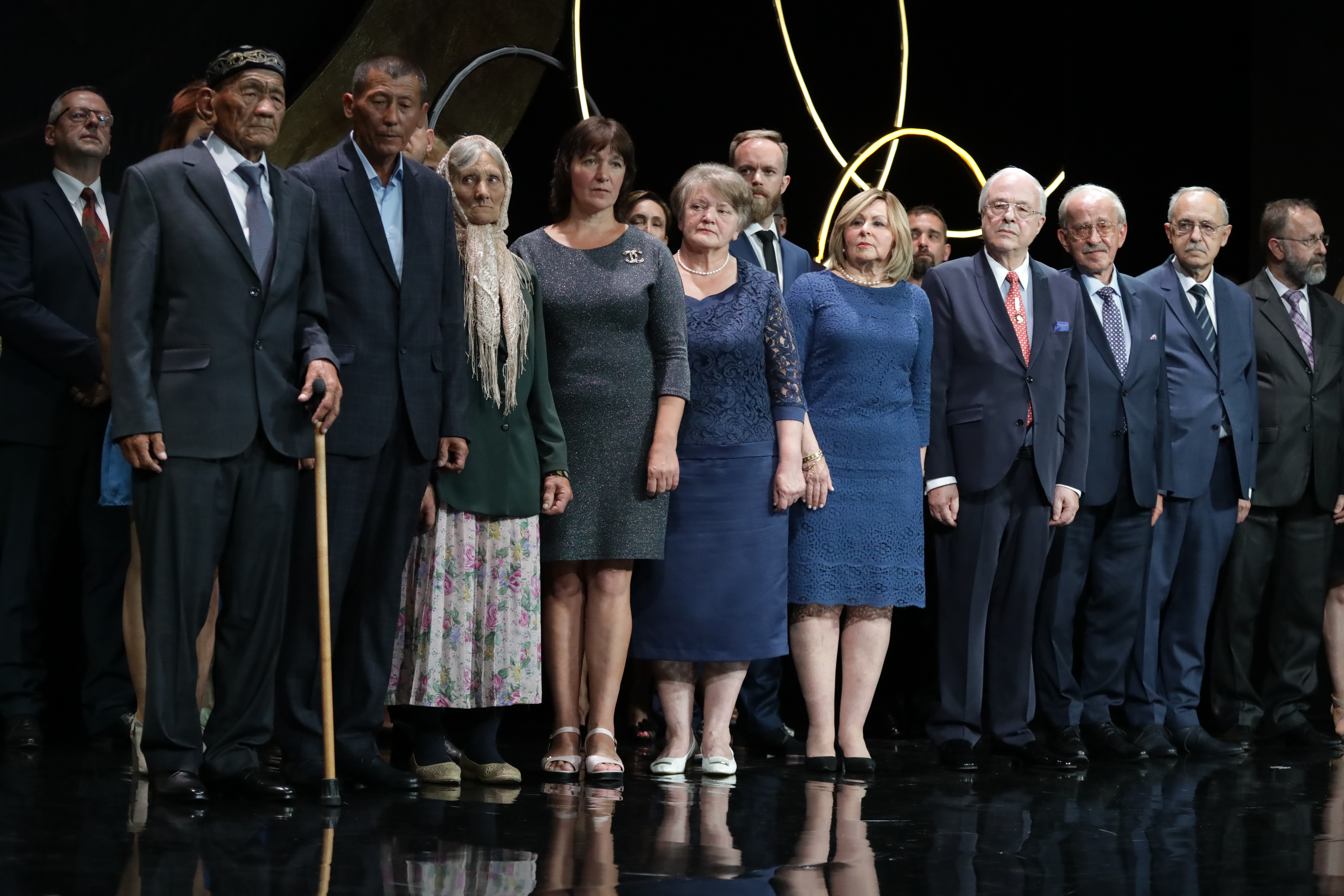
Laureates of the Virtus et Fraternitas Medal in 2019

The Virtus et Fraternitas Medal (Polish name: Medal Virtus et Fraternitas; Latin for "Courage and Brotherhood") is a Polish state decoration established on 9 November 2017.

It is awarded by the President of Poland on recommendation of the director of the Pilecki Institute as a token of commemoration and gratitude to those who provided aid and assistance to Polish citizens against Soviet and Nazi Germany war crimes as well as other crimes motivated by nationalism committed between 1917–1990. It is also bestowed to honor individuals who voluntarily keep alive the memory of those who did not survive the war or the forced deportations, and found their graves abroad.

The medal has been conceptually compared to Yad Vashem's Righteous Among the Nations Awards.

== Design ==
The medal is round and silver. On the obsverse it is inscribed "VIRTUS ET FRATERNITATIS" (virtue and brotherhood). In the center of the medal carved stylized image of the White Eagle. The cross is 36 mm in diameter.

The Virtus et Fraternitas Medal is suspended from a purple ribbon, 36 mm wide. Symmetrically arranged along the edges of the ribbon are gold stripes each 4 mm wide, both 4 mm from the edge.

== Recipients ==
The medal was awarded for the first time on 19 June 2019. Among the awarded were:

- Tassybay Abdikarimov
- Oleksandra Vaseyko
- Chaim Eiss
- Zinaida Giergiel
- Anatolij Giergiel
- Władysław Konopczyński
- Juliusz Kühl
- Aleksander Ładoś
- Władysława Nagórka
- Antoni Nagórka
- Konstanty Rokicki
- Stefan Ryniewicz
- Adolf Henryk Silberschein
- Lóránd Utassy

The second awarding of medals took place on June 2, 2021 at the Presidential Palace in Warsaw. They were given to the following persons:

- Maria Bazeluk
- Petro Bazeluk
- Ecaterina Caradja
- Petro Hrudzewycz
- Jenő Etter
- Anna Jelínková
- Jan Jelínek
- Jozef Lach
- Žofia Lachová

The third award ceremony of medals took place on June 15, 2022 at the Belweder Palace in Warsaw. They were given to the following persons:

- Raymond Voegeli
- Marie Gorius
- Eugène Gorius
- Rosalie Fogel
- Jeanine Humbert
- Léon Humbert
- Hélène Pionstka
- Peter Fraser
- Janet Fraser
- Aristides de Sousa Mendes
- César de Sousa Mendes
- Pedro Correia Marques
- Ján Klinovský
- Julien Bryan
- Paul Super
- Elna Gistedt-Kiltynowicz
- Kateryna Bojmistruk
- Fedor Bojmistruk
- Mykhailo Susla
- Józsefné Margit Károlyi
- Edith Weiss
- Erzsébet Szapáry
- Antal Szapáry

On 20 December 2022 were decorated:

- Ilona Andrássy de Csíkszentkirály et Krasznahorka
- Trofim Danieluk
- Zinaida Samczuk
- Hanna Skakalska (1905–1987)
- Hanna Skakalska (1887–1966)
- Musij Skakalski

On 6 July 2023 were decorated:

- Semen Biliczuk
- Ustyna Kowtoniuk
- Sawa Kowtoniuk
- Paraskewa Padlewska
- Lubow Parfeniuk
- Anton Parfeniuk
- Piotr Parfeniuk
- Oksana Karpiuk
- Jewhenia Bondaruk
- Prokop Bondaruk
- Anastasija Koreń
- Mykoła Koreń
- Sofia Kyc
- Pawło Kyc
- Herasym Łukiańczuk
- Wołodymyr Kryżuk

On 17 December 2024 were decorated:

- Martha Gammer
- Rudolf Anton Haunschmied
- Etela Lacušová
- Oto Ludvig
- Berta Ludvigová
- Helena Vargová
- Ferdinánd Leó Miklósi
- Walborg Svensson Bernacka
- Alfred Iversen
- Aud Valla

On 29 October 2026 were decorated:

- Klára Andrássy
- Lorna Bale
- Erling Berge
- Anna Bielkiewicz
- Adolf Dahl
- Hans Dahl
- Narinobu Hirayama
- Tadanori Ishiguro
- Ann Jacques
- Józef Jakóbkiewicz
- Niels Jørgensen
- Fumi Matsuzawa
- Stefania Mudra
- Maria Trojan (1887–1972)
- Maria Trojan (1920–1960)
- Leif Myklebust
- Zofia Teliga
- Emil Vogl

== See also ==
- Orders, decorations, and medals of Poland
- History of Poland (1918–1939)
- History of Poland (1939–1945)
- History of Poland (1945–1989)
- Massacres of Poles in Volhynia and Eastern Galicia

== See also ==
- Pilecki Institute
