= The New Cold War =

The New Cold War may refer to:

- Second Cold War, a term typically associated with tensions between either the United States and China or the United States and Russia in the 21st century
- New Cold War (1979–1985), an intensive reawakening of Cold War tensions.
- The New Cold War: Putin's Russia and the Threat to the West, a 2008 book by Edward Lucas
- The New Cold War: Moscow v. Pekin, a 1963 book by Edward Crankshaw
- The new Cold War?: Religious Nationalism Confronts the Secular State, a 1993 book by Mark Juergensmeyer
- The New Cold War: Revolutions, Rigged Elections, and Pipeline Politics in the Former Soviet Union, a 2007 book by Mark MacKinnon

== See also ==
- Cold War
