= Konstanty Rokicki =

Polish diplomatic official and Holocaust rescuer

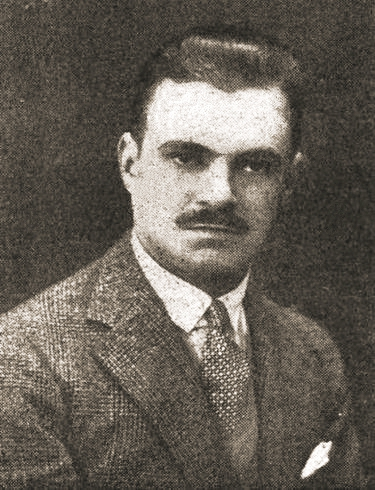
- Born: June 16, 1899; Warsaw
- Died: July 18, 1958 (aged 59); Lucerne
- Occupations: consular officer, diplomat
- Spouse: Maria Goldman
- Children: Wanda Rokicka
- Honours: Righteous Among the Nations,

Konstanty Rokicki (16 June 1899 in Warsaw – 18 July 1958 in Lucerne) was a Polish consular officer, vice consul of the Republic of Poland in Riga and Bern, and a Holocaust rescuer. Between 1941 and 1943 he was a member of the Ładoś Group also called the Bernese Group. Rokicki used his diplomatic position of vice consul to produce false Latin American passports and had them smuggled to the German-occupied Poland and Netherlands where they saved lives of their Jewish bearers. For his efforts Rokicki was named Righteous Among the Nations by Israel in 2019.

== Childhood and early career ==
Rokicki was born to Józef and Konstancja née Pawełkiewicz. Being a cavalry lieutenant, he got two awards for bravery, probably during Poland's war of independence, or the Polish-Soviet war, 1919–1920. In 1934, he was qualified as reserve officer for the 1st Regiment of Riflemen. On August 17, 1936, Rokicki married Maria, née Goldman (Goldmanis). The couple had a daughter, Wanda Rokicka (1938–2008), who would become a UN employee in Geneva.

In 1931, he joined the consular service of the Ministry of Foreign Affairs. Between 1932 and 1933, he was a contractual employee of the Polish Consulate in Minsk, at that time capital of the Byelorussian Soviet Socialist Republic. In 1934–1936 he was vice-consul in Riga, and in the years 1936–1938 a contract employee of the Polish Legation in Cairo. From 1939 to 1945, he was the vice-consul of the Republic of Poland in Bern. He was working also for the Polish intelligence.

== Holocaust rescue action and "passport affair" ==
It is estimated that between 1941 and 1943, Rokicki and his subordinate, Jewish diplomat Juliusz Kühl produced several thousands of illegal Paraguayan passports which served as protection documents for Jews stranded in the Nazi ghettos in German-occupied Poland and who were threatened with deportation from German-occupied Netherlands.

Rokicki and Kühl personally bribed the Paraguayan honorary consul, Bernese notary Rudolf Hügli to obtain blank passes which Rokicki filled out with the names of the Polish Jews. The lists of beneficiaries and their photos were smuggled between Bern and occupied Poland thanks to the network of Jewish organizations, in particular Agudat Yisrael and RELICO, headed by Chaim Eiss and Abraham Silberschein respectively. The passports of Paraguay – unlike the passports of other Latin American countries – had a special value, because this country – under the pressure of Poland and the Holy See – temporarily recognized (1944) their validity.

== Later life and legacy ==
Consul Rokicki left the diplomatic service in 1945, after the establishment of the pro-Soviet Provisional Government of National Unity and settled permanently in Switzerland. He died in Lucerne in July 1958, after several years of illness. Rokicki's name was never mentioned by historians, despite the fact that Agudat Yisrael mentioned him in its thank you letter to the Polish government alongside Aleksander Ładoś, Juliusz Kühl and Stefan Ryniewicz. The organization claimed in it that, without their activities, it would not be possible to save "many hundreds of people".

Only in August 2017, Canadian journalist Mark MacKinnon and Polish journalists Zbigniew Parafianowicz and Michał Potocki wrote about the role of Rokicki in the rescue operation.

== Yad Vashem controversy ==
In April 2019 the Yad Vashem granted the title of Righteous Among the Nations to Konstanty Rokicki and offered "appreciation" to Aleksander Ładoś and Stefan Ryniewicz arguing that Rokicki headed the Ładoś Group. The document erroneously called Ładoś and Ryniewicz "consuls". The decision sparked outrage and frustration among the family members of the two other late Polish diplomats, and among survivors. Thirty one of them signed an open letter to Yad Vashem. Rokicki's cousin refused to accept the medal until two other Polish diplomats, Rokicki's superior are recognized as Righteous Among The Nations, too. Polish Ambassador to Switzerland Jakub Kumoch who contributed to the discovery of Rokicki also refuted the Yad Vashem's interpretation stating that Rokicki worked under Ładoś and Ryniewicz. Eldad Beck of Israel Hayom suggested that this decision was politically inspired and related to the worsening of Israel-Poland relations due to the controversy over the Amendment to the Act on the Institute of National Remembrance.

== See also ==
- Ładoś Group
- Raoul Wallenberg
