= Eiss Archive =

Eiss Archive refers to the collection of documents and related memorabilia documenting the rescue by Polish diplomats of Jews threatened by the Holocaust during World War II. The archive is named after Chaim Yisroel Eiss, a Jewish Rabbi and activist who jointly set up the Ładoś Group.

== History ==
The archive is named after Chaim Eiss, a Jewish activist, who during World War II co-created the Ładoś Group (also known as the Bernese Group), a group of Polish diplomats and Jewish activists led by the Polish ambassador to Switzerland in Bern, Aleksander Ładoś. During the war the group developed a system of illegal production of Latin American passports aimed at saving European Jews from The Holocaust. The documents are said to have made their way to Israel with one of Eiss’ descendants after World War II.

The documents that form the Archive were acquired by the Polish Ministry of Culture from a private collector in Israel in 2018. They were displayed in the Polish embassy in Switzerland in January 2019, and later were transferred to the Auschwitz-Birkenau State Museum in Poland.

== Contents ==
The collection includes eight forged Paraguayan passports as well as correspondence between persons to be rescued and Polish diplomats and Jewish organisations, photos of Jews seeking to obtain the documents, and a list of thousands of individuals, Polish Jews in ghettos in occupied Poland, who corresponded with the rescue activists.

== Implications ==
The documents in the Eiss archive helped establish that 330 people survived the Holocaust due to the actions of the Ładoś Group. Despite their efforts, 387 individuals corresponding with the group were identified as Holocaust victims even though they held the forged passports. The fate of 430 others known to have communicated with the group is not known.

== See also ==
- Hotel Polski
- Righteous Among the Nations
