= Stefan Ryniewicz =

Polish diplomat (1903–1988)

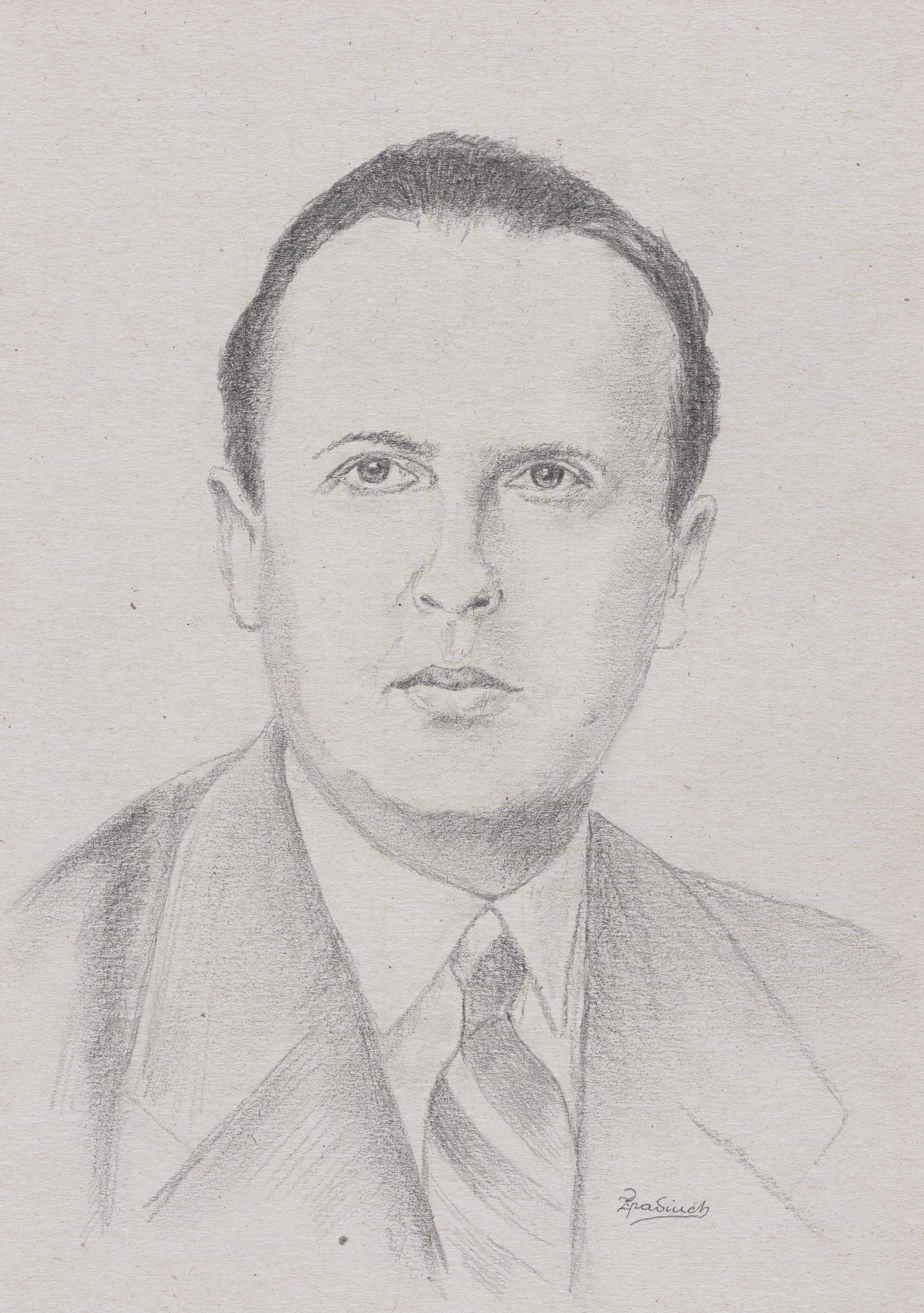
- Born: December 26, 1903; Tarnopol, Austria-Hungary
- Died: March 9, 1988 (aged 84); Buenos Aires, Argentina
- Resting place: Boulogne, Buenos Aires
- Occupations: diplomat, entrepreneur
- Known for: member of the Ładoś Group

Stefan Jan Ryniewicz (26 December 1903 – 9 March 1988) was a Polish diplomat and counselor of the Legation of Poland in Bern between 1940 and 1945. He was a member of the Ładoś Group also called as Ładoś Group and played a crucial role in illegal manufacturing of thousands of Latin American passports to save Jews from the Holocaust.

== Early life and diplomatic career ==
Ryniewicz was born in Tarnopol, south-east Poland, today west Ukraine. He attended a secondary school in Lwów. In the late 1920s, he married Zofia née Zasadni. The couple had two sons: Jan Christian (1931-1989) and Tomasz Maria (1934-1983). The descendants of Ryniewicz live today in Argentina and the United States.

In 1928 Ryniewicz began his work as an employee and then as head of the consular department of the Polish Legation in Bern, where he worked until 1933. After that, he was an employee in the office of Polish Foreign Minister Józef Beck and from 1935 to 1938 he was consul and head of the consular department of the Polish Legation in Riga, Latvia. On December 28, 1936, he was one of the passengers of PLL LOT's Lockheed Electra, which crashed near Susiec killing three people. Ryniewicz – injured – survived the accident. Between December 1938 and July 1945, he again worked in the Polish Legation in Bern - first as the First Secretary and then as Counsellor. In the years 1940-45 he was deputy head of mission and close collaborator of minister Aleksander Ładoś.

== Ładoś Group and Latin American passport ‘affair’ ==
Ryniewicz and his subordinates Konstanty Rokicki and Juliusz Kühl are supposed to have invented the Latin American passport scheme – a way to rescue Jews stranded in the ghettoes in German-occupied Poland. They successfully convinced Jewish leaders from Switzerland – Abraham Silberschein and Chaim Eiss to finance the operation. Thanks to the Paraguayan passports produced by the Polish diplomats, their owners were able to survive the dissolution of the ghettos - they were not taken to extermination camps but rather to internment camps in France and Germany, where they could be exchanged for Germans interned in Allied states.

The blank passports were bought from the honorary consul of Paraguay, Bernese notary Rudolf Hüggli. Juliusz Kühl would bring them to the Polish Consular Section at Thunstrasse 21, where they were filled out by viceconsul Konstanty Rokicki with the names of Polish, German and Dutch Jews. Passport details - the lists of names with photos - were smuggled by Silberschein and Eiss. Ryniewicz and his superior Aleksander Ładoś provided diplomatic protection for the entire operation and intervened with the Swiss authorities and diplomatic corps.

According to journalists Zbigniew Parafianowicz and Michał Potocki, the German authorities did not investigate the operation until they had intercepted the last packet of forged passports following the Warsaw Ghetto Uprising. Another theory claims that one of the passport bearers tried to escape to Paraguay and alarmed its authorities which – in their turn – cancelled all passports signed by Hügli and informed in December 1943 the Nazi German government.

The activity of the Ładoś Group was probably known to the Swiss police already in late 1942. In January 1943 the Swiss police interrogated Hüggli and after a few months also Eiss and Silberschein. They all admitted that the Paraguayan passports were produced by the legation of Poland and pointed at Ryniewicz and/or Rokicki.

After the group was uncovered by the police, Ryniewicz intervened with the head of Swiss police Heinrich Rothmund, who, at that time, was considered the main architect of the Swiss refugee policy. Although Rothmund underlined his strongly negative attitude to the operation in an interview with Ryniewicz ("I have very energetically explained to him the dangerousness and untenability of passport maneuvers.")., Silberschein was released from custody and the Polish diplomats were not held accountable. The meeting between Ładoś and the Swiss Foreign Minister Marcel Pilet-Golaz could have also helped in the matter.

In early 1944, the Germans deported most of the holders of Paraguayan passports from the internment camp in Vittel to Auschwitz-Birkenau, where they were murdered. Poland and the Holy See called on the government of Paraguay and other Latin American governments to temporarily recognize the passports. After a long hesitation Salvador and Paraguay responded positively to this request, which was probably crucial for rescuing hundreds of passport holders who were still in the Bergen-Belsen internment camp.

The exact number of people rescued thanks to the Ładoś Group, including Stefan Ryniewicz, is unknown. According to Agudat Yisrael, one can speak of "several hundred persons".., while the journalists Zbigniew Parafianowicz and Michał Potocki estimate the number of rescued to be 400 people."). These people were mostly religious Jews who barely had any chance of surviving in the Holocaust. The legend of the Latin American passports was widespread in the Warsaw ghetto and they were even the subject of the poem "Passports" by Władysław Szlengel. The role that the Polish Legation in Bern played in the production of passports was hardly known. The participation of Ryniewicz and Rokicki in the operation was only proven in August 2017 by the journalists of Dziennik Gazeta Prawna (Poland) and The Globe and Mail (Canada).

== Later life ==
When the Polish Embassy in Bern was taken over by the pro-communist Government of Poland, Ryniewicz resigned from diplomatic work and remained loyal to the Polish government-in-exile. Later Ryniewicz moved to Argentina, where he became the chairman of the Polish Club (Club Polaco) in Buenos Aires. At the same time he was a businessman and activist of the Polish diaspora.

On December 31, 1972, Ryniewicz was awarded the Officer's Cross of the Order of Polonia Restituta. The certificate signed by the President Stanisław Ostrowski does not contain an explanation. Ryniewicz died in Buenos Aires on 9 March 1988 and was buried in the cemetery in Boulogne Sur Mer.

== Yad Vashem controversy ==
In April 2019 the Yad Vashem granted the title of Righteous Among the Nations to Konstanty Rokicki and offered "appreciation" to Aleksander Ładoś and Stefan Ryniewicz arguing that Rokicki headed the Ładoś Group. The document erroneously called Ładoś and Ryniewicz "consuls". The decision sparked outrage and frustration among the family members of the two other late Polish diplomats, and among survivors. Thirty one of them signed an open letter to Yad Vashem. Rokicki's cousin refused to accept the medal until two other Polish diplomats, Rokicki's superior are recognized as Righteous Among The Nations, too. Polish Ambassador to Switzerland Jakub Kumoch who contributed to the discovery of Rokicki also refuted the Yad Vashem's interpretation stating that Rokicki worked under Ładoś and Ryniewicz. Eldad Beck of Israel Hayom suggested that this decision was politically inspired and related to the worsening of Israel-Poland relations due to the controversy over the Amendment to the Act on the Institute of National Remembrance.

== See also ==
- Ładoś Group
- Raoul Wallenberg

== Literature ==
- Agnieszka Haska - Proszę Pana Ministra o energiczną interwencję. Aleksander Ładoś (1891–1963) i ratowanie Żydów przez Poselstwo RP w Bernie; Zagłada Żydów. Studia i Materiały.
- Stanisław Nahlik - Przesiane przez Pamięć, Kraków 2002 r.
