= Western Cross =

Western Cross Krzyż Zachodni
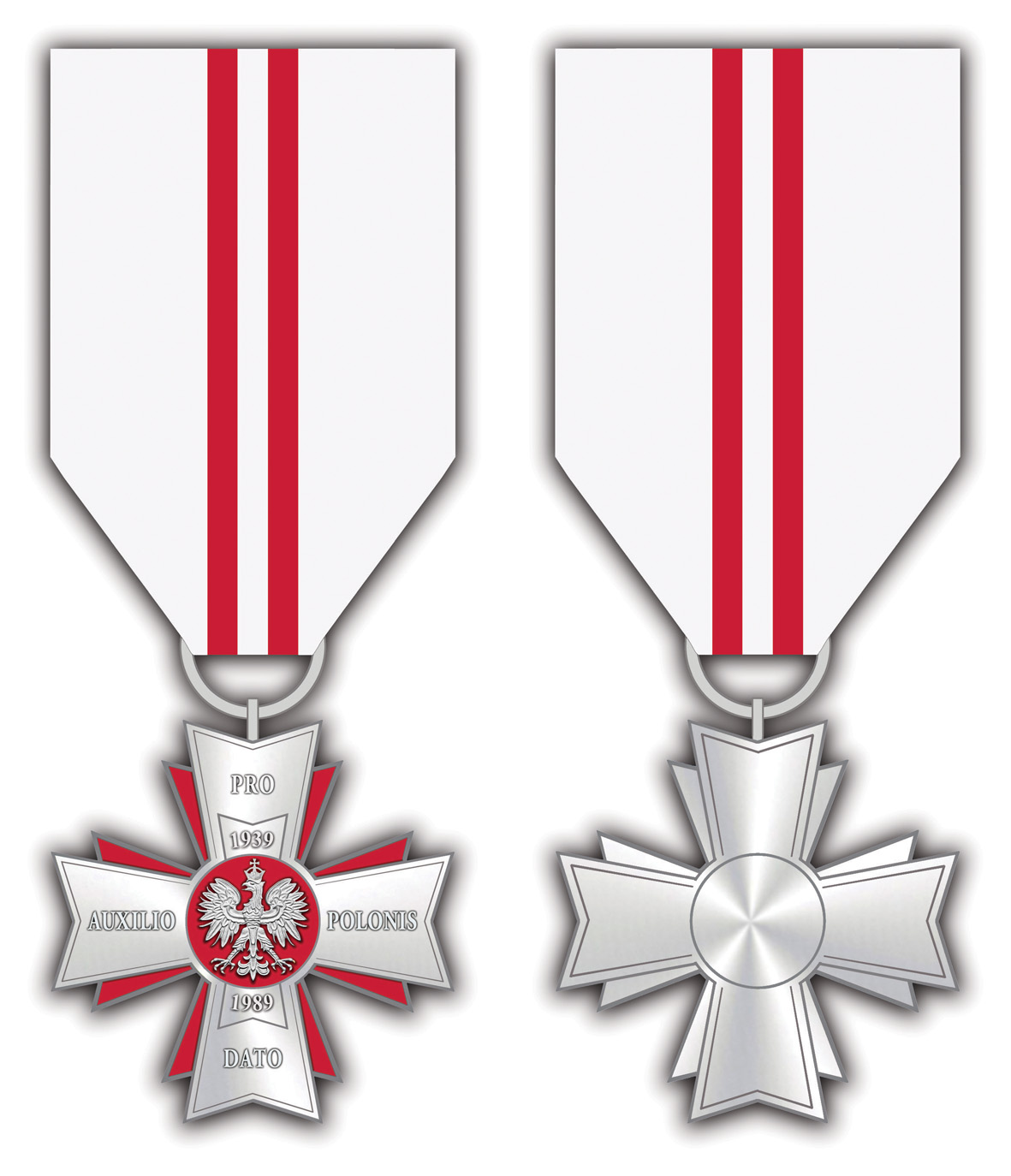
- Obverse and reverse
- Type: Commemorative decoration of merit
- Country: Poland
- Presented by: the President of Poland
- Status: Currently awarded
- Established: 7 April 2017
- Ribbon of the cross
- Related: Eastern Cross

The Western Cross (Krzyż Zachodni) is a Polish decoration established on 7 April 2017.

The concept of the Cross was presented by senator Jan Żaryn, and designed by Robert Szydlik and Tadeusz Jeziorowski.

It is awarded by the President of Poland on recommendation of the Minister of Foreign Affairs, who might be advised by e.g. the head of the Office for War Veterans and Victims of Oppression, the director of the Pilecki Institute as a token of commemoration and gratitude to foreigners who provided aid and assistance to Polish citizens persecuted by Nazi and communist regimes between 1939 and 1989 in places not included by the Eastern Cross.

== Design ==
On the obsverse it is inscribed "PRO AUXILIO POLONIS DATO" (For aid given to Poles).
