= Ładoś Group =

Group of Polish diplomats and Jewish activists

Ładoś Group, Bernese Group (Polish: grupa berneńska or grupa Ładosia, French: groupe bernois) is a name given to a group of Polish diplomats and Jewish activists who during Second World War elaborated in Switzerland a system of illegal production of Latin American passports aimed at saving European Jews from the Holocaust. It is estimated that thanks to the action about 10,000 people were saved from being sent to German extermination camps.

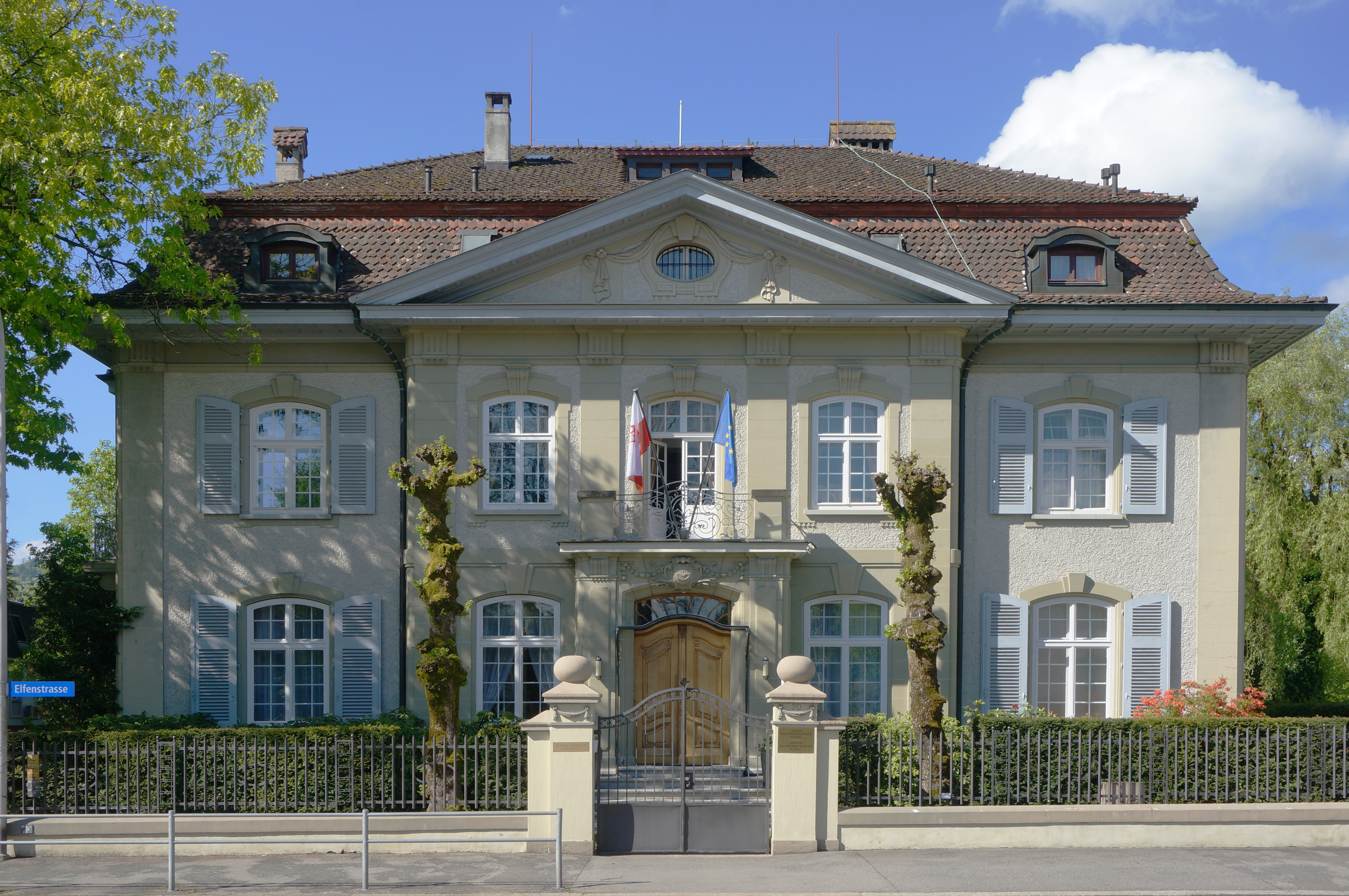
Residence of the Embassy of the Republic of Poland in Bern

== Composition of the group ==
The group consisted of four diplomats from the Polish Legation in Bern, a representative of the RELICO Assistance Committee for the Jewish Victims of the War established by the World Jewish Congress and a representative of Agudat Israel. Five out of six members had Polish citizenship, while half of them were Jewish.

The members of the Ładoś Group were:

- Aleksander Ładoś (1891–1963), Polish Envoy in Bern in the years 1940–1945
- Abraham Silberschein (1881–1951), advocate, Zionist activist, pre-war deputy to the Sejm of the Republic of Poland, founder of the rescue committee RELICO
- Konstanty Rokicki (1899–1958), Polish consul in Bern in 1939–1945
- Chaim Yisroel Eiss (1876–1943), a merchant born in Ustrzyki, leading figure of Agudat Israel residing in Zürich.
- Stefan Ryniewicz (1903–1987), counselor of the Polish Legation in the years 1938–1945, Aleksander Ładoś' deputy
- Juliusz Kühl (1913–1985), attaché of the Polish Legation, expert on contacts with Jewish diaspora in Switzerland.
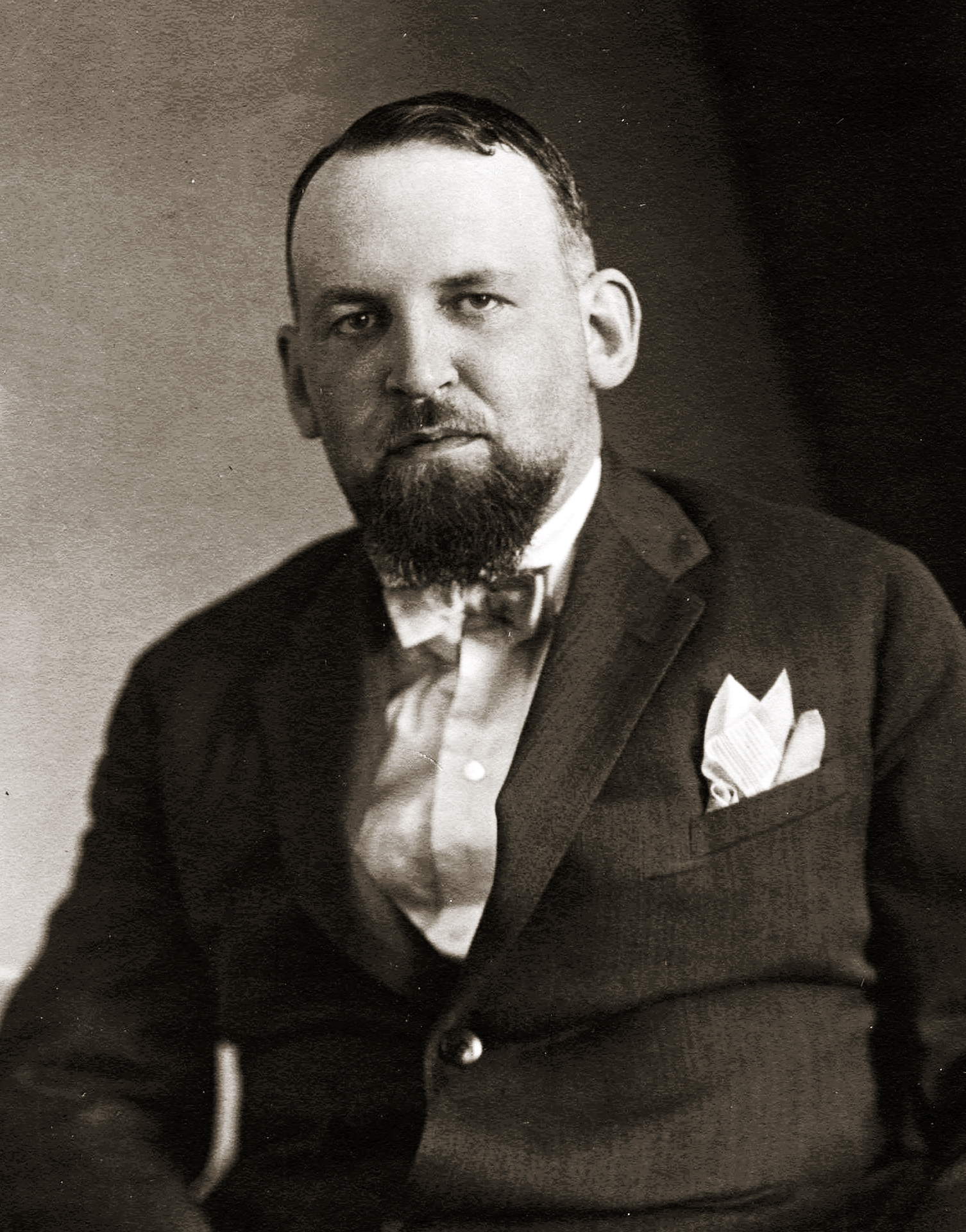
Aleksander Ładoś

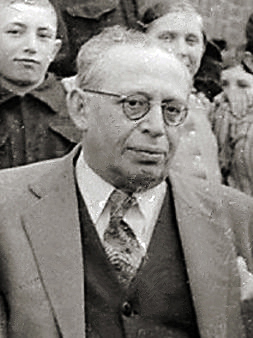
Abraham Silberschein

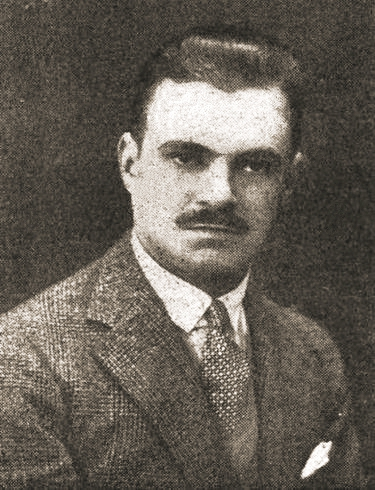
Konstanty Rokicki

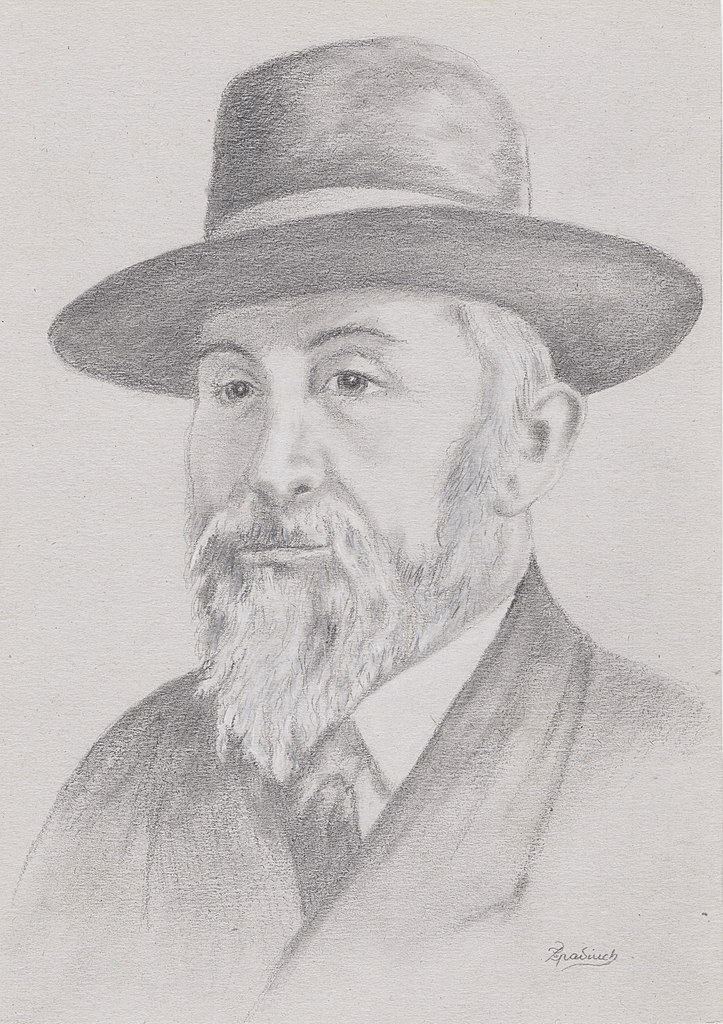
Chaim Eiss

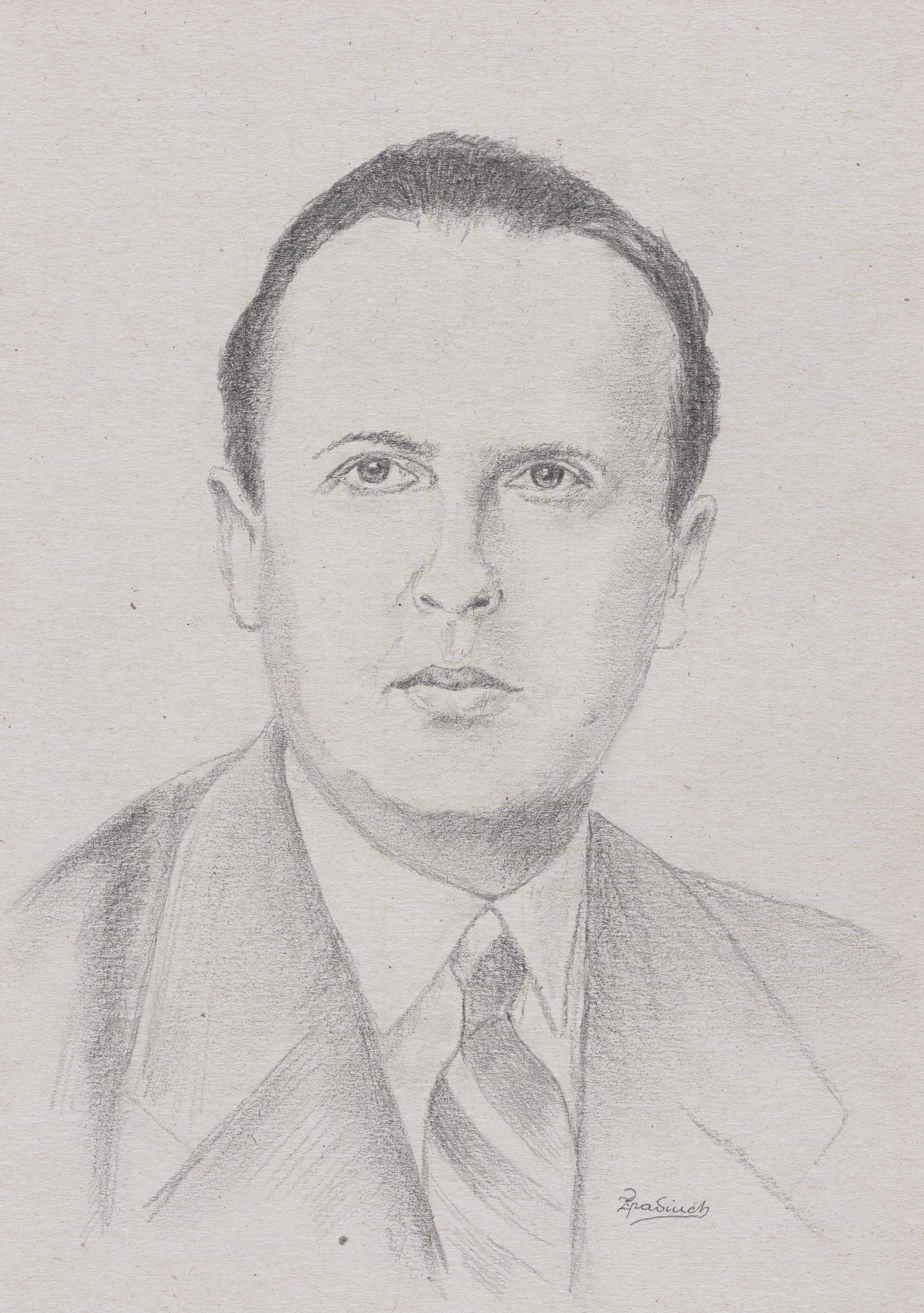
Stefan Ryniewicz

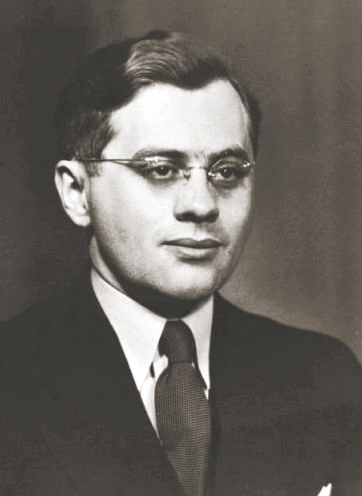
Juliusz Kühl

The Ładoś Group had a semi-informal structure and connections between its members were asymmetrical. It was Konstanty Rokicki who was most involved in acquiring blank passports and filling them out; Abraham Silberschein and Chaim Yisroel Eiss and Alfred Schwarzbaum (a Jewish rescue activist refugee from Bedzin) dealt with smuggling of passports, photos and personal data between Bern and German-occupied Europe, and provided a significant part of the financing of the operation. The role of Aleksander Ładoś and Stefan Ryniewicz was to ensure a diplomatic cover-up among the Bernese diplomatic corps and prevent Swiss authorities from breaking up the operation. Both Ładoś and Ryniewicz intervened in this case in 1943, and exchanged arguments with Swiss foreign minister Marcel Pilet-Golaz and the police chief Heinrich Rothmund. Juliusz Kühl, who at the outbreak of the war was a 26-year-old graduate of doctoral studies at the University of Bern, facilitated contacts between Jewish organizations and the Legation. In later years he was also nominated as the deputy head of the consular division. He probably also dealt with illegal transport of blank passports.

== Historical background ==
In September 1939, Poland was attacked by Nazi Germany and the Soviet Union and divided into two occupation zones. Nearly 36 million Polish citizens, including over 3 million Jews, were subjected to German and Soviet rule. At the same time, the Polish government refused to surrender and on September 17, 1939 crossed the border with Romania, where was interned. In accordance with the constitution of 1935, President Ignacy Mościcki appointed Władysław Raczkiewicz as his successor. Also, a new Polish government-in-exile was formed in Paris and began to rebuild the armed forces in France. The government, headed now by general Władysław Sikorski, took control of the entire property of the Polish State abroad, including the network of its diplomatic missions. After the German invasion of France the government moved to London, from where it continued to fight the Germans. In the continental part of Western Europe, the Polish government-in-exile was represented by the legations in Switzerland, Portugal, Spain and Sweden. Other countries either came under German occupation or, under the pressure of the Germans, closed Polish diplomatic missions. In Bern, Switzerland, the Legation was located at Elfenstrasse in the diplomatic district of Kirchenfeld. Additionally, since 1940 another building housing a Consular Section, at Thunstrasse, was rented. Since April 1940, the Legation was headed by Aleksander Ładoś, a pre-war envoy to Latvia (1923–26) and a consul general in Munich (1927–31). Ładoś left Poland after the invasion and served briefly as a member of Sikorski's government. When he took up the post in Bern, the other three diplomats – already worked there: Ryniewicz from 1938, and Kühl and Rokicki from 1939. Rokicki and Ryniewicz knew each other from their previous post in Riga (1934–36) and were probably close friends. Only in Bern they met Kühl and Ładoś. Abraham Silberschein, who was supposed to be the delegate for the 21 Zionist Congress, came to Geneva from Lviv shortly before the outbreak of the war. Chaim Yisroel Eiss had been staying in Switzerland since the beginning of the 20th century and had a store in Zürich. Both representatives of Jewish organizations did not know each other before the war and were politically very distant.

== Genesis and production model of passports ==
According to Juliusz Kühl, an idea of producing false passports was invented at the eve of 1940 and had no connection with the Holocaust. Several dozen of Paraguayan documents were produced with a view of enabling influential Jews from the areas occupied by the Soviet Union an escape through Japan. The legation identified an honorary consul of Paraguay, a Bernese notary Rudolf Hügli, who was ready to sell blank passports and bought about 30 of them. It is not known who filled them and how they were sent to the Soviet Union. Initially, it was assumed that such activities could be carried individually, since the scheme could be revealed. However, in later years production of similar documents continued. The most known example is the passport obtained by Eli Sternbuch for his future wife Guta Eisenzweig and her mother in November 1941. The Sternbuch family obtained it by contacting Juliusz Kühl. It is not known who filled out this document. 1957 Yad Vashem's study suggests there were more passports – in particular in 1941 during the German invasion of the Soviet Union and after the creation of Jewish ghettos. In some cases bearers of such documents were released from the obligation to live in ghettos and wear a band with the Star of David. The production of passport on a mass scale begun in 1942, after Wannsee Conference, when the mass murder of European Jews was decided. From that moment, passports of Latin American countries protected from deportation to Nazi Germany Extermination camp, as their holders were sent to internment camps in Germany and occupied France. Initially, the operation was carried out chaotically, which increased the possibility of setback. This was the reason why the Legation reached out to Abraham Silberschein in 1942.

Investigated by the police, Silberchein described it as follows: I had a meeting at the Polish Legation in Bern with Mr I secretary Ryniewicz and Mr. Rokicki, who manages the consular section. Both gentlemen drew my attention to the fact that some people in Switzerland deal with providing passports of Latin American countries of for Poles in countries occupied by Germany. These passports enable their holders to improve their situation. We were having a real "black market" of passports. The gentlemen from the Legation expressed their desire that I would take responsibility for this matter, which I also did on behalf of RELICO.

== Passports of Paraguay ==
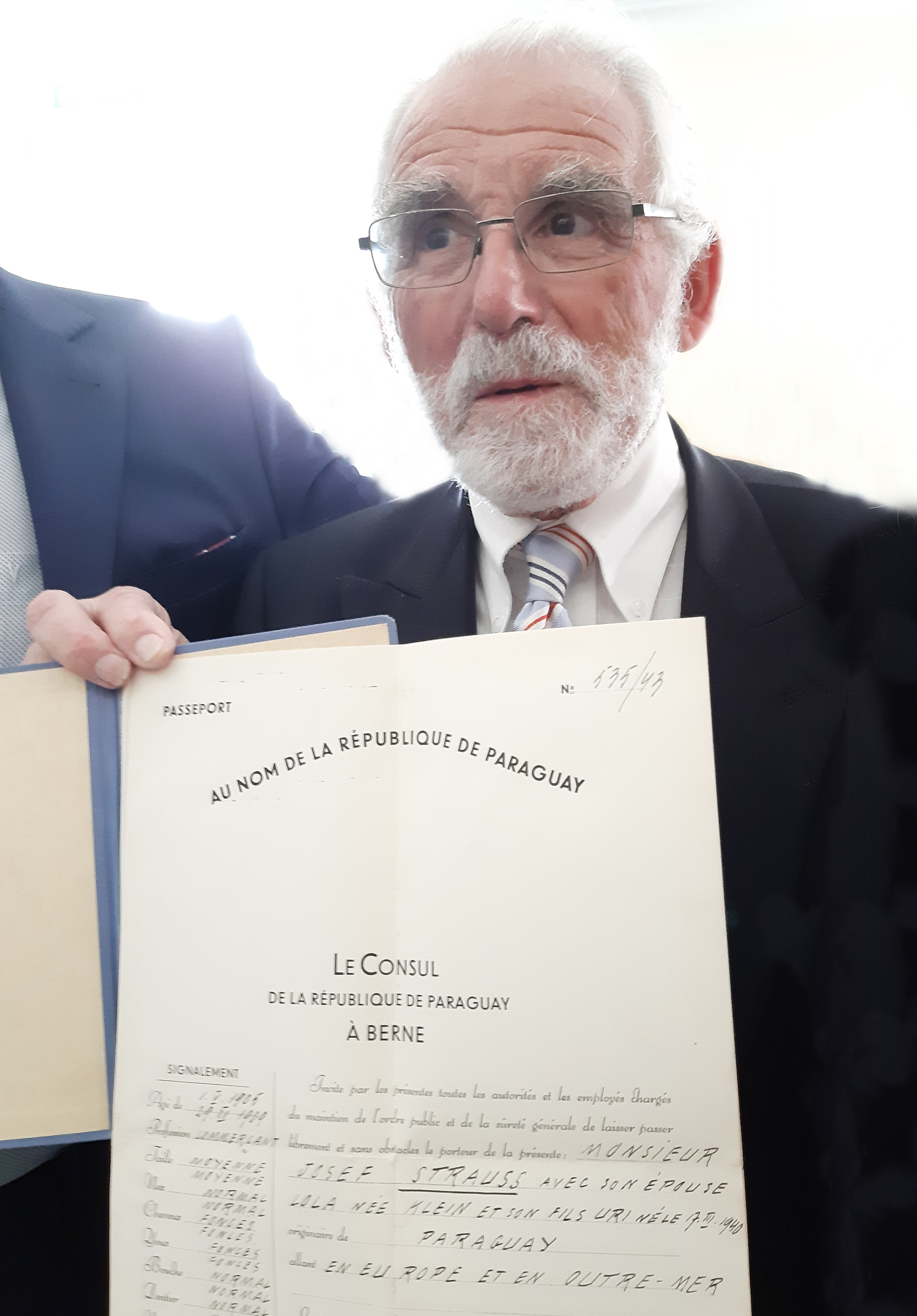
Uri Strauss, saved by the Ładoś Group with a fake Paraguay passport

It was RELICO-Legation axis which constituted core of the scheme. Silberschein would send lists of people foreseen to become passport holders to Rokicki who would record them and had Paraguay's passports fabricated. A typical exchange of correspondence between Silberschein and Rokicki in 1942 and 1943 includes a letter from Silberschein with the list of persons to whom the documents were to be granted. Rokicki sent Silberschein in turn filled passports or their copies certified by a notary public and a letter from consul Rudolf Hügli in which holders of the passports were informed that they had received a Paraguayan citizenship. Apart from that, many separate confirmations of Paraguay's citizenship were issued. The lists of recipients of such documents contains several thousand names. At first glance it seems that the vast majority of Paraguay passports were issued between 18 and 30 December 1942 and none of them was filled in 1943. However, the correspondence between Silberschein and Rokicki available in the archives of Yad Vashem indicates that these passports were backdated (there is an evidence that several passports of 30 December 1942 were issued in the autumn of 1943). The vast majority of Paraguay's passports has the traces of handwriting of Konstanty Rokicki, but there are also several passports filled with a different character. The most probable version is that they are filled either by Juliusz Kühl or Stefan Ryniewicz, himself an experienced consul. Passports were issued for Jewish citizens of Poland, the Netherlands, Slovakia and Hungary as well as for Jews deprived of their Germany citizenship. The ordinal numbers of passports found in the Silberschein archives in Yad Vashem suggest that at least three series of these documents had been produced, tallying altogether to least 1056 pieces. In many cases there are more than one or two people mentioned in the passports. It may be easily assessed that at least 2,100 people were beneficiaries of these documents. Each passport cost between 500 and 2,000 Swiss francs. The money was transferred to Rudolf Hügli by Polish diplomats – Rokicki, Kühl and Ryniewicz – and brought him enormous income. By comparison, the then monthly salary of Aleksander Ładoś equaled to 1,800 francs, and this of Juliusz Kühl – to 350 francs.

== Passports of Peru and El Salvador ==
In 1943 Silberschein established contact with the consul of Peru in Geneva, José Barreto. Baretto handed to Silberschein 28 passports for 10–12,000 francs. The General Consul of Peru, who was informed about this maneuver, dismissed Barreto. In this case, an argument erupted between Silberschein and Ryniewicz, who accused former of acting on his own hand and giving the matter a resemblance of conspiracy. From this correspondence, it appears that the Polish Legation demanded full information on the action. Ryniewicz also took successful intervention to save Barreto and cover up the case and inspired similar action by the Polish Legation in Lima. In 1943, Silberschein established contact with a Jewish employee of the General Consulate of El Salvador in Geneva, George Mandel-Mantello. Mantello – most probably with the consent of his consul – Arturo Castellanos, handed him completed passports and citizenship certificates. The Polish legation was probably informed about the number of issued passports and about contacts between Silberschein-Mantello, but there is no evidence that it participated in the production of documents. Arturo Castellanos was declared in 2010 by Yad Vashem the Righteous Among the Nations.

== Passports of Honduras, Haiti and other countries ==
In case of passports of Honduras Silberschein contacted directly with Anton Bauer, the former Honorary Consul of Honduras, who stole the seal and issued the documents illegally at his office in Bern. The recipient of Silberschein's letters was Bauer's daughter – Isabella. In one case, however, one can see traces of obtaining passports through Rokicki. On May 27, 1943, Silberschein asked him to organize a series of passports for the next day and at least two Honduran passports were issued shortly thereafter.

== Outcome of the rescue efforts ==
In January 1944 Silberschein reported that thanks to the action about 10,000 people were saved from being sent to German extermination camps. According to him bearers of the Latin American passports were placed in internment camps in Tittmoning, Liebenau and Bölsenberg in Germany and in the Vittel camp in France. In March 1944, the Germans liquidated the latter, murdering from 200 to 300 prisoners, but those staying in other places were mostly spared. One of the documents from Silberschein's archive estimates that shortly before the liberation of Bergen-Belsen sub-camp there were over 1,100 holders of passports. Silberschein also wrote that he had met many of them met during his visit to Poland in May 1946.

In December 2019 list of names of 3262 holders of passports issued by Ładoś Group was presented at the Pilecki Institute in Warsaw. It is estimated though that from 5000 to 7000 names of the passports' bearers remains unknown. The research has been carried out by team led by Jakub Kumoch in Arolsen Archives - International Center on Nazi Persecution, Yad Vashem, and Archives of New Proceedings in Warsaw.

== Ładoś Group in literature ==
The majority of studies gives the credit of saving Jews to single members of the group. This is due to the fact that the group was acting in conspiracy and due to the lack of holistic memories written by any of its members. Aleksander Ładoś announced the description of the rescue action in the third, unfinished volume of memories, but he died without having written the story. Diplomats from the Ładoś Group – Ładoś, Rokicki, Kühl and Ryniewicz – were named in the letter of thanks from Agudat Israel from January 1945. In 2015 Agnieszka Haska published an article about saving Jews by the Polish diplomats in Bern. In August 2017 Markus Blechner, the Honorary Consul of Poland in Zürich, together with journalists Zbigniew Parafianowicz and Michał Potocki described the scheme, recognizing the contribution of all group members to the survival of passport holders. The matter of Latin American Passports was the subject of a poem by Władysław Szlengel, a Polish-Jewish poet, an author of the poem "Passports", written in the Warsaw Ghetto.

== Eiss Archive ==
A number of documents related to the Ładoś Group were acquired by the Polish Ministry of Culture, with the assistance of Honorary Consul Markus Blechner, from a private collector in Israel in 2018. Named the Eiss Archive, they were displayed in the Polish embassy in Switzerland in January 2019, and later were transferred to the Auschwitz-Birkenau State Museum in Poland.

== Yad Vashem controversy ==
In April 2019 the Yad Vashem granted the title of Righteous Among the Nations to Konstanty Rokicki and offered "appreciation" to Aleksander Ładoś and Stefan Ryniewicz arguing that Rokicki headed the Ładoś Group. The document erroneously called Ładoś and Ryniewicz "consuls". The decision sparked outrage and frustration among the family members of the two other late Polish diplomats, and among survivors. Thirty one of them signed an open letter to Yad Vashem. Rokicki's cousin refused to accept the medal until two other Polish diplomats, Rokicki's superior are recognized as Righteous Among The Nations, too. Polish Ambassador to Switzerland Jakub Kumoch who contributed to the discovery of Rokicki also refuted the Yad Vashem's interpretation stating that Rokicki worked under Ładoś and Ryniewicz. Eldad Beck of Israel Hayom suggested that this decision was politically inspired and related to the worsening of Israel-Poland relations due to the controversy over the Amendment to the Act on the Institute of National Remembrance.

== See also ==
- The Holocaust in Poland
- Rescue of Jews by Poles during the Holocaust
- List of Poles: Holocaust resisters
- Individuals and groups assisting Jews during the Holocaust
- Henryk Sławik

== Bibliography ==
- Lecture by Polish Ambassador to Switzerland, Jakub Kumoch, delivered on 4 February 2018, at the Shoah Museum in Paris
- Michał Potocki, Zbigniew Parafianowicz (8 August 2017). "Forgotten righteous. Polish envoy in Bern saved hundreds of Jews from the Holocaust". gazetaprawna.pl. Dziennik Gazeta Prawna.
- Michał Potocki, Zbigniew Parafianowicz (7 August 2017). "Polak na polecenie rządu ratował Żydów od Holokaustu. Świat się o tym nie dowiedział". gazetaprawna.pl. Dziennik Gazeta Prawna.
- "As the Bernese Group saved Jews. The Ambassador of the Republic of Poland presented the documents". tvp.info. public Polish Television. 5 February 2018.
- "Karczewski: oddajemy cześć tym, którzy tworzyli łańcuch dobrych serc / we honor those who formed a chain of good hearts". pap.pl. Polish Press Agency.
- Petrović, Petar. "Ambasador Polski w Szwajcarii: Polacy pomagali przy wykupie Żydów z rąk nazistów. Alianci byli temu przeciwni / Ambassador of Poland in Switzerland: Poles helped with the purchase of Jews from the Nazis". polskieradio.pl. Polish Radio.
- Sternbuch, Gutta; Kranzler, David (2005). Gutta: Memories of a Vanished World. A Bais Yaakov Teacher's Poignant Account of the War Years with a Historical Overview. Jerusalem-New York. ISBN 9781583307793.
- Uszynski, Jedrzej. "Ambasador Ładoś i jego dyplomaci – niezwykła akcja ratowania Żydów z Holocaustu / Ambassador Ładoś and his diplomats - an extraordinary rescue action Jews from the Holocaust". berno.msz.gov.pl. Embassy of Poland in Bern.
- Eck, Nathan (1957). The Rescue of Jews with the Aid of Passports and Citizenship Papers of Latin American States. Yad Vashem Studies.
- Haska, Agnieszka. ""Proszę Pana Ministra o energiczną interwencję". Aleksander Ładoś (1891–1963) i ratowanie Żydów przez Poselstwo RP w Bernie". holocaustresearch.pl. Zagłada Żydów. Studia i Materiały R. 2015, nr 11, ss. 299-309.
- "Embassy of the Republic of Poland in Switzerland: the consul issued in the 1940s passports for about 2 thousand. Jews". pap.pl. Polish Press Agency.
- Kumoch, Jakub; Maniewska, Monika; Uszyński, Jędrzej; Zygmunt, Bartłomiej (2020). The Ładoś List. Pilecki Institute. ISBN 978-83-66340-18-3.
