= Rudolf A. Haunschmied =

Austrian author and local historian (born 1966)

Rudolf Anton Haunschmied (born 1966) is an Austrian author and local historian.

== Life and achievements ==
Rudolf A. Haunschmied grew up and lived in Sankt Georgen an der Gusen, Austria. Even as a youngster, before his education as a mechanical engineer, he researched the "lost" history of the St. Georgen-Gusen-Mauthausen area with its four Nazi concentration camps and focused as a pioneer on the history of the KZ Gusen I & II & III Concentration Camps.

In 1986 he became a founding member of Arbeitskreis für Heimat-, Denkmal- und Geschichtspflege St. Georgen (AHDG) which gave the Gusen Memorial Committee (GMC) a home until January 2008, when he was again among the founding members of the then independent Gusen Memorial Committee. In 1989 he published the first history of the St. Georgen-Gusen-Mauthausen complex upon request of the municipality of his hometown St. Georgen/Gusen. He led excursions to the remnants of the camps as well as study circles for years and advises students and researchers.

With Pierre Serge Choumoff of Amicale Francaise de Mauthausen (Paris) and others he organized the first local-international commemoration at Gusen in 1995 and founded the Mauthausen-Gusen Info-Pages in 1997.

In 1996 and 1997 he founded two city-partnerships and was member of Reforminitiative Mauthausen (Federal Initiative to Modernize the Mauthausen Memorial) at the Austrian Federal Ministry of the Interior in 2000 that led to the opening of a new visitors´ center at KZ Gusen in 2004.

In 2007 he contributed to Audiowalk Gusen and to many publications and documentations on radio and TV in the last 25 years. In 2009 he requested successfully the opening of the "Bergkristall" tunnels of KZ Gusen II for the public and an adequate monumental protection of KZ Gusen I & II remnants. From 2019 to 2021, Rudolf Haunschmied contributed as scientific advisor to the creation of virtual guides for the Mauthausen Memorial on the former Mauthausen-Gusen concentration camp complex and the associated inter-spaces.

He resides in Traun.

== Key Publications ==
- Zum Gedenken 1938 bis 1945, in: 300 Jahre erweitertes Marktrecht St. Georgen/Gusen, St. Georgen a.d. Gusen, 1989
- KZ Mauthausen-Gusen Info-Pages [www.gusen.org], 1997 - today
- Geschichtespaziergang in St. Georgen und Gusen, Volkshochschule der Arbeiterkammer, St. Georgen/Gusen, 1993-2005
- Konzentrationslager Gusen, in: Unsere Heimat der Bezirk Perg, Verein zur Herausgabe eines Bezirksheimatbuches, Perg 1995
- Gusen - Eine Manifestation österreichischen Vergessens?, in: Christoph Mayer, Das unsichtbare Lager - Audioweg Gusen, Berlin 2007
- Co-author with Alfred Grau: Der Zusammenbruch 1945 wie wir ihn erlebten, in: St. Georgener Heimatblätter (2007)
- Co-author with Jan-Ruth Mills, Siegi Witzany-Durda: St. Georgen-Gusen-Mauthausen - Concentration Camp Mauthausen Reconsidered, BoD, Norderstedt 2008, ISBN 978-3-8334-7440-8, available via Google-Books St. Georgen-Gusen-Mauthausen
- Getta la pietra! Il lager di Gusen-Mauthausen, Mimesis Edizioni, Milano 2008
- Bundesministerium für Inneres: Zur aktuellen Diskussion um Bergkristall, Dokumentation, Wien 2009
- B8 Bergkristall - Historical Visit of the International Mauthausen Committee, May 7, 2010, Gusen Memorial Committee, 2010
- NS-Geschichte 1938-1945, in: 400 Jahre Markt St. Georgen an der Gusen, St. Georgen a.d. Gusen, 2011
- Editor for Karl Littner: Life Hanging on a Spider Web - From Auschwitz-Zasole to Gusen II, BoD, Norderstedt 2011, ISBN 978-3-8423-9840-5 available via Google-Books Life Hanging on a Spider Web
- Zur Geschichte des Lagerteiles Gusen im ehemaligen KZ-Doppellager Mauthausen-Gusen, In: Ueberleben durch Kunst - Zwangsarbeit im Konzentrationslager Gusen für das Messerschmittwerk Regensburg, Dr. Peter Morsbach Verlag, Regensburg 2012, ISBN 978-3-937527-52-9
- Die Bevoelkerung von St. Georgen/Gusen und Langenstein. Umgang mit der Lagergeschichte, Ablehnung und Initiativen zur Bewahrung, in: Gedenkstaetten fuer die Opfer des Nationalsozialismus in Polen und Oesterreich - Bestandsaufnahme und Entwicklungsperspektiven (Proceedings to conference at Scientific Center of the Polish Academy of Sciences in September 2010 in Vienna), Peter Lang Edition, Frankfurt am Main 2013, ISBN 978-3-631-62461-6
- Zur Bedeutung des Pfarrgebietes von St. Georgen/Gusen als Schluesselregion zur Ausbeutung von KZ-Haeftlingen durch die Schutzstaffel, in: Denk.Statt Johann Gruber - Neue Wege der Erinnerungskultur, Wagner Verlag, Linz/Donau 2014, ISBN 978-3-902330-93-2
- Zur Landnahme der Schutzstaffel im Raum St. Georgen-Gusen-Mauthausen, in: Oberösterreichische Heimatblätter, 69. Jahrgang, Heft 3/4, Amt der OÖ. Landesregierung, Direktion Kultur, Linz/Donau 2015, ISBN 3-85393-021-2
- The Gusen II Jew Camp and the Messerschmitt Bergkristall underground plane factory in St. Georgen on the Gusen. In: Joseph Fisher: The Heavens were Walled In, New Academic Press, Vienna 2017, p. 175 ff. ISBN 978-3-7003-1956-6

== Awards ==
- Cultural Award of the Municipality of St. Georgen/Gusen for extraordinary achievements in researching the lost history of Complex St. Georgen-Gusen-Mauthausen (1990).
- Medal of Merit to the State Government of Upper Austria for year-long commemorative activities within "Arbeitskreis für Heimat-, Denkmal- und Geschichtspflege St. Georgen/Gusen" (2008)
- "Consultant for Science" of State Government of Upper Austria (2013)
- Złoty Medal Opiekuna Miejsc Pamięci Narodowej - Golden medal for preservers of Polish national memorial sites (2014)
- Decoration of Merit in Gold to the Republic of Austria (2015)
- Medal of Merit in Gold to the Municipality of Langenstein (2016)
- Decoration of Honor Meritorious for Polish Culture - Medal for Achievements for Polish Culture (2017)
- pl:Złota Sowa Polonii - Golden Owl (2019)
- Professional title "Professor" by appointment of Austrian Federal President Alexander Van der Bellen (2021)
- Roll of Honor Engraved in Metal to Klub Mauthausen-Gusen, Warsaw (2022)
- Virtus et Fraternitas Medal by the President of Poland, Andrzej Duda (2024)
