= Iwona Kozłowska =

Polish diplomat

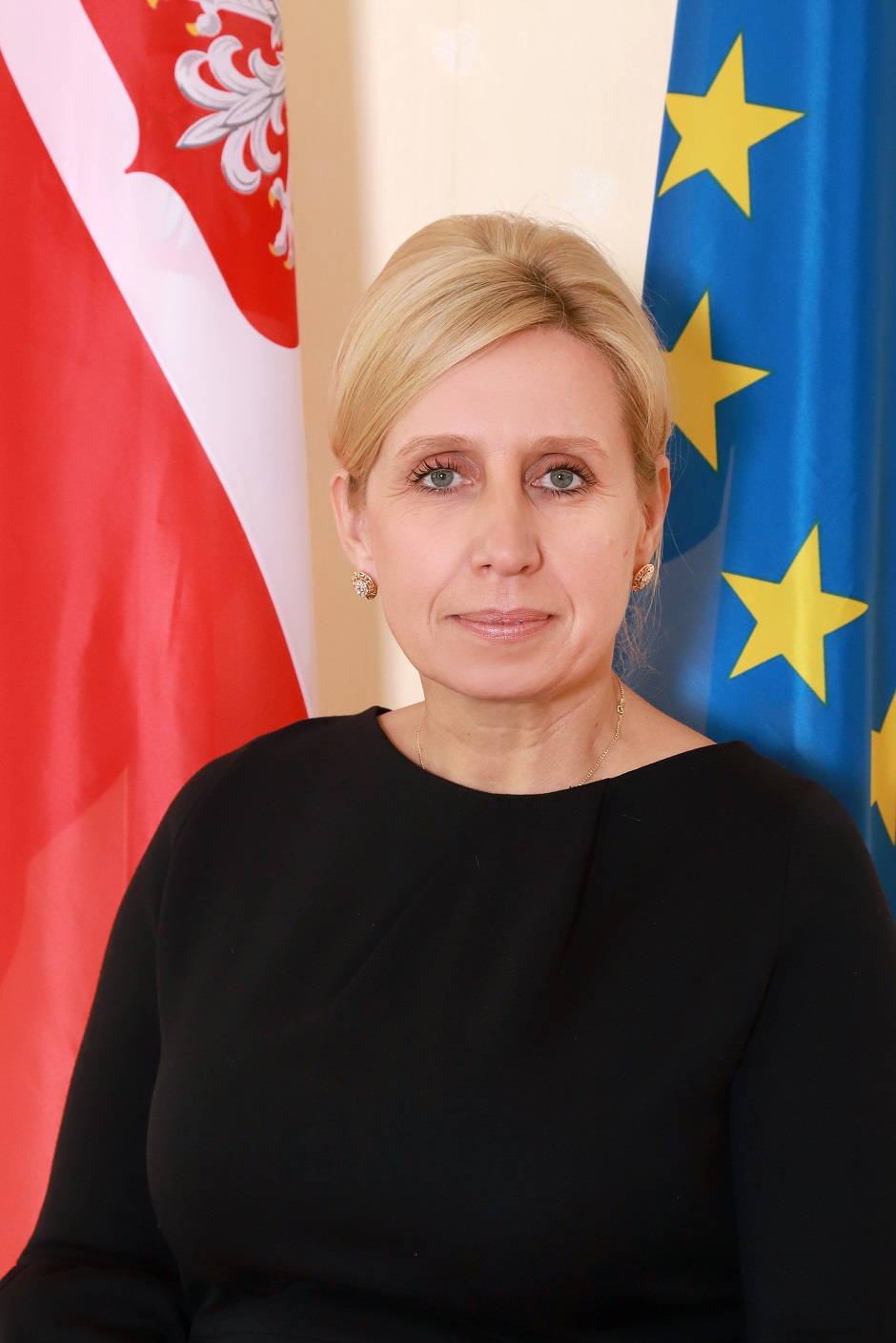

Poland Ambassador to Switzerland
- In office 13 October 2020 – 30 June 2024
- Preceded by: Jakub Kumoch

Personal details
- Children: 2
- Education: University of Wrocław, RWTH Aachen University

Iwona Kozłowska is a Polish diplomat, who served as Poland's ambassador to Switzerland (2020–2024).

== Life ==
Kozłowska graduated from German studies at the University of Wrocław (M.A., 1995), and European Studies at the RWTH Aachen University (M.A., 1999). She has been also intern and exchange student in Heidelberg (1992, 1993/1994), Bochum (1993), and Grand Canyon University, Phoenix, Texas.

In October 1999, Kozłowska started her professional career as Deputy Director of the Polish Institute in Berlin. In 2001, she joined the Chancellery of the President of the Republic of Poland, Foreign Affairs Office. She was responsible for relations with Western Europe and Weimar Triangle countries. Since 2005, she has been working for the Ministry of Foreign Affairs (MFA), European Union Department as a desk officer for relations with German-speaking countries. Between 2007 and 2012, she was serving as the head of Political Unit at the Embassy of Poland in Berlin. Following her return to Poland, from 2012 to 2014 she was deputy director at the Chancellery of the Prime Minister of Poland. In 2014, she became at first deputy, and in 2019 director of the MFA Department for Cooperation with Polish Diaspora and Poles Abroad. In August 2020, she was nominated Poland ambassador to Switzerland, accredited also to Liechtenstein. She presented her credentials on 13 October 2020. She ended her term on 30 June 2024.

She is married, with son and daughter. Besides Polish, she speaks German and English fluently, as well basic Russian and French.

== Honours ==
In 2019, President Andrzej Duda honoured her with Gold Cross of Merit. In 2019, she was also honoured with Pro Patria Medal.
