= Tassybay Abdikarimov =

Kazakhstani farmer and engineer (1938–2020)

- Тасыбай Әбдікәрімов
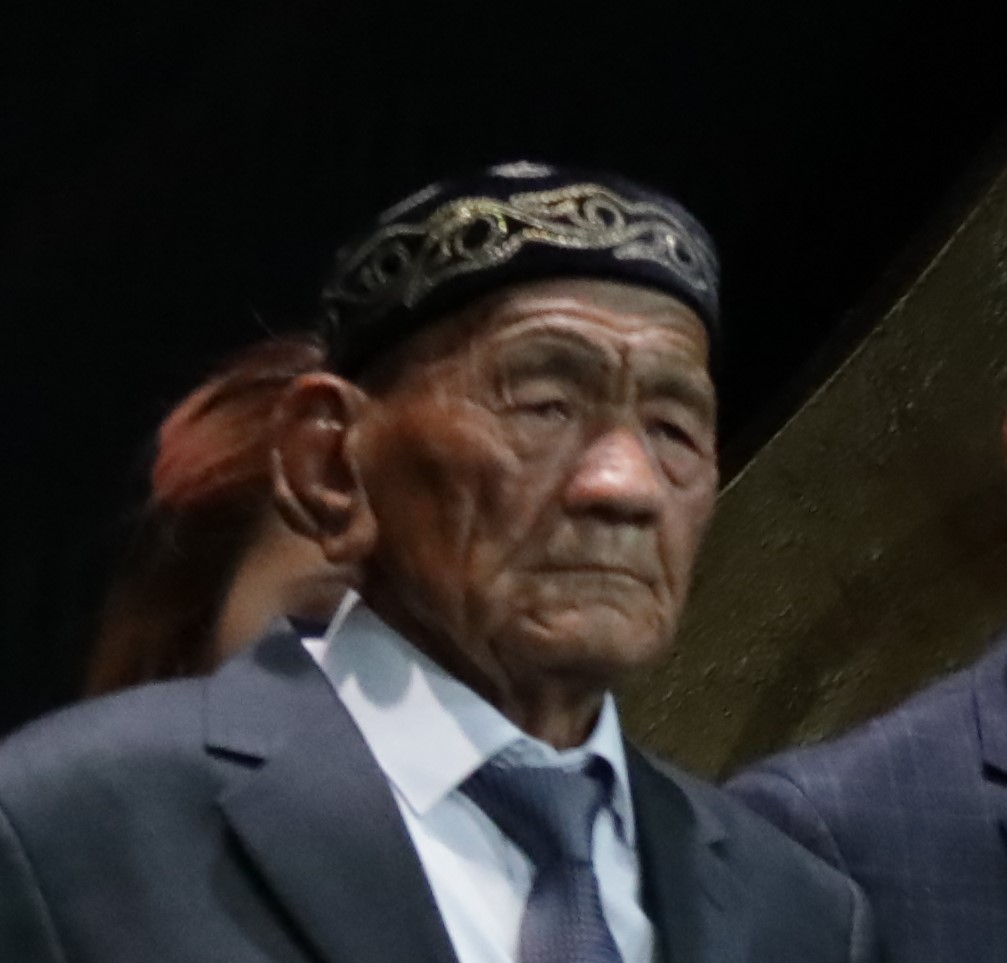
- Born: 1938
- Died: 17 December 2020 (aged 81–82); Maktaaral District
- Education: Tashkent Institute of Irrigation and Melioration
- Occupations: farmer, engineer

Tassybay Abdikarimov (Kazakh: Тасыбай Әбдікәрімов, Tasybaı Ábdikárimov; 1938 – 17 December 2020, Maktaaral District) was a Kazakh farmer and engineer, awarded with Virtus et Fraternitas Medal.

Abdikarimov grew up in a farmer family. Since 1952, he has been helping the Jabłoński family: Amelia and her three children, including Walenty (born 1932). The Jabłońskis, eventually settled in the Pakhta-Aral sovkhoz in the village of Ilich, have been among Poles involuntarily deported by the Soviet authorities to Kazakhstan, sharing their lives with the locals. Despite an extremely difficult situation – sanitary conditions, food shortage, and hard labor causing a high mortality rate among the inhabitants – Tassybay Abdikarimov has been helping the Jabłońskis to adapt, especially by providing food to the ill Walenty and the rest of the family. He was also helping Walenty to hide his photo camera. Thanks to the medical education he had begun before the deportation, Walenty has been serving local community as a physician, gaining recognition. In 1956, the Jabłońskis were allowed to return to Poland. They have been keeping in touch with Abdikarimov.

Later, Abdikarimov graduated from the Tashkent Institute of Irrigation and Melioration and worked in southern Kazakhstan as a farmer engineer. For many years he has been looking after the graves of Poles who died in Kazakhstan.

In appreciation of his effort, in 2019, Abdikarimov was awarded with Virtus et Fraternitas Medal. He received the honour from the president Andrzej Duda during the event at the Polish Theatre in Warsaw, in the presence of the Deputy Marshal of the Sejm Małgorzata Gosiewska, Deputy Prime Piotr Gliński, as well as Walenty Jabłoński.

== See also ==
- Poles in Kazakhstan
