= Eastern Cross =

Eastern Cross Krzyż Wschodni
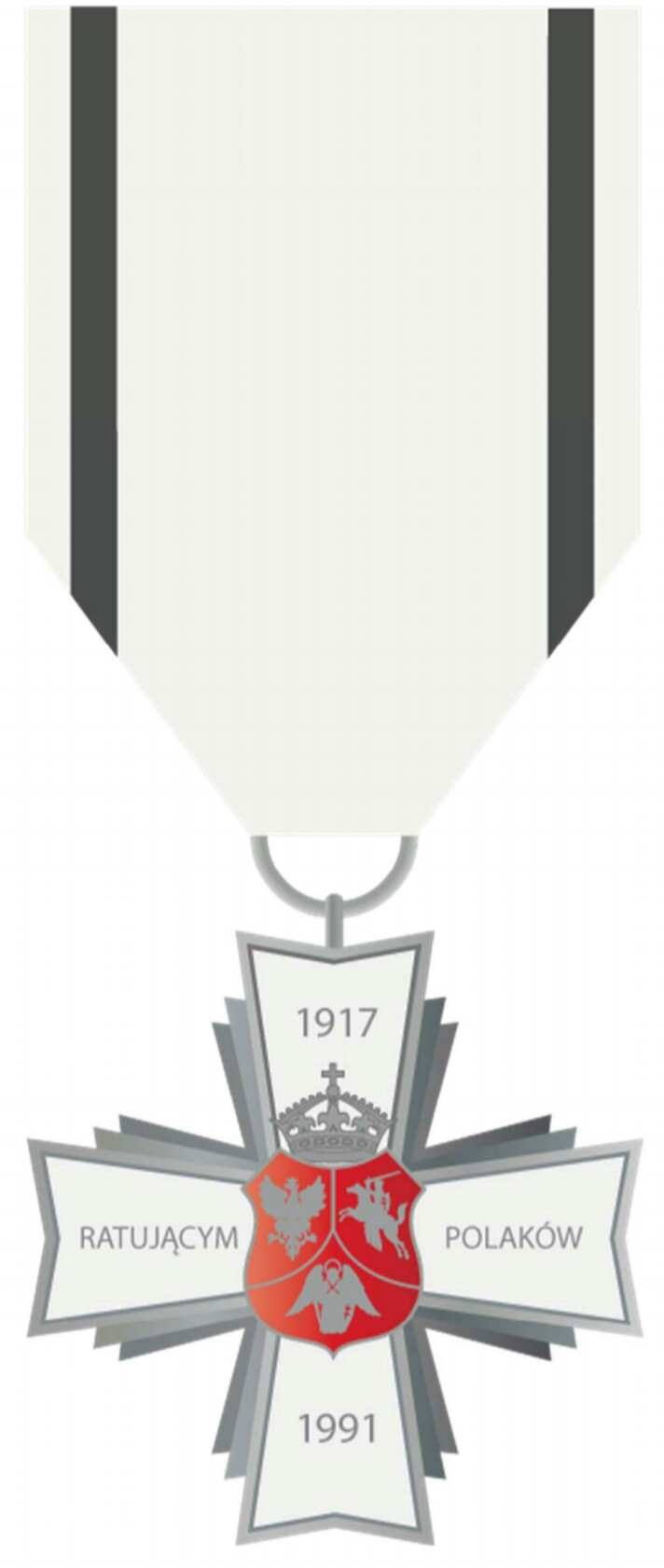
- Obverse
- Type: Commemorative decoration of merit
- Country: Poland
- Presented by: the President of Poland
- Status: Currently awarded
- Established: 15 December 2016
- Ribbon of the cross
- Related: Western Cross

The Eastern Cross (Krzyż Wschodni) is a Polish decoration established on 15 December 2016.

The concept of the Cross was presented by Member of Sejm Michał Dworczyk. It is said to be the element of the politics of memory.

It is awarded by the President of Poland on recommendation of the Minister of Foreign Affairs, who might be advised by e.g. the head of the Office for War Veterans and Victims of Oppression, the director of the Pilecki Institute with opinion of the President of the Institute of National Remembrance as a token of commemoration and gratitude to foreigners who provided aid and assistance to Polish citizens persecuted by Nazi and communist regimes between 1917 and 1991 in the territory of Eastern Borderlands and the Soviet Union.

== Design ==
On the obverse it is inscribed "RATUJĄCYM POLAKÓW" (To the rescuers of Poles).

== See also ==
- Pilecki Institute
- Western Cross
