= Abraham Silberschein =

20th-century Polish politician

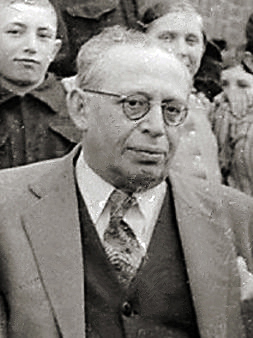
- Born: Adolf Henryk Silberschein; March 30, 1882; Lwów, Austria-Hungary
- Died: December 30, 1951 (aged 69); Geneva, Switzerland
- Resting place: Jewish cemetery, Geneva
- Occupations: lawyer, diplomat
- Known for: member of the Polish Sejm (1922–1927) member of the Ładoś Group
- Spouse: Fanny Hirsch

Adolf Henryk Silberschein, also known as Abraham Silberschein (born March 30, 1882, in Lwów, Austria-Hungary, today Ukraine, died December 30, 1951, in Geneva, Switzerland) was a Polish-Jewish lawyer, activist of the World Jewish Congress, Zionist, member of the Polish Sejm (1922–1927). During the Holocaust he was a member of the Ładoś Group also called the Bernese Group, an informal cooperation of Jewish organizations and Polish diplomats who fabricated and smuggled illegal Latin American passports to occupied Poland, saving their holders and their families from immediate deportation to German Nazi death camps.

== Early life and political career ==
Silberschein was born in Lwów as the son of Jakub Silberschein, a dentist and his wife Anna née Polturak. He did his university studies in Lwów and Vienna, obtaining a PhD in law and in philosophy. After coming back, he opened a law practice in Lwów at Trybunalska Street (today Shevs'ka, ukr. Шевська). During the Interwar period, he was active in Zionist organizations, and part of the board of the short-lived Hitachdut Zionist Labor Party (Mifleget haAvoda haTzionit Hitachdut, 1925–1938). Dr. Silberschein left for Geneva on August 9, 1939, three weeks before the German invasion of Poland.

== Ładoś Group and Holocaust rescue action ==
During the Holocaust, Silberschein took an active part in the attempt to save Jews by organizing passports of Latin American countries. He did so under the "RELICO" Assistance Committee established in Geneva and in full co-operation with the World Jewish Congress.

Initially, these activities had an incidental character, but in 1942–43 began to be carried out on a massive scale. Silberschein remained in close contact with Polish diplomats Juliusz Kühl, Stefan Ryniewicz and Konstanty Rokicki. He raised funds to bribe corrupted Latin American honorary consuls and had the lists of beneficiaries smuggled from and into the ghettoes of the German-occupied Poland. He also collaborated with Peruvian Consul José María Barreto, later recognized as Righteous Among the Nations, and probably also – independently – with consuls of Honduras and Haiti.

In the autumn of 1943, he was briefly arrested by the Swiss police. He then testified that he had acted on behalf of Ryniewicz and Rokicki, from whom he had learned about the passport mechanism itself and who had asked him to coordinate the activities. This way, passports could be bought in bulk, which reduced their price. Silberschein said:

"A few months ago, I had a meeting in Bern, at the Polish Legation, with Mr Ryniewicz, first secretary of the Legation, and with Mr Rokicki, who heads the consular section in Bern. They drew my attention to the fact that certain persons in Switzerland had taken on the task of providing passports from South American countries to Poles who found themselves in various countries under German occupation. Those passports enabled those concerned to obtain an improvement in their lot.

It was a case of a real "black market" in passports, and those gentlemen of the Legation made known to me their desire that I should take charge of the matter; I accepted the proposal in the name of RELICO. That way, those concerned could avoid having to pay enormous sums of money. I can state that 80% of the passports were paid for by the Universal Committee of Jewry.

I reached an agreement with Mr Rockicki of the consular section of the Polish legation in Bern, who took on the task, which he still has, of handing passports from Paraguay over to me".

The bearers of the passports were interned by the Germans as citizens of neutral countries, and not deported to the death camps as most of the Polish Jewish population. "I must say that the difference in treatment was enormous, and that one could even say that often, in that way, the person concerned escaped death", he testified.

According to the Swiss police reports Rokicki hand-filled the Paraguayan passports and delivered the bribes to Hügli sometimes helped by his Jewish subordinate, attaché Juliusz Kühl. The head of the Legation, Aleksander Ładoś and his deputy Stefan Ryniewicz would secure the diplomatic coverage of the action and intervened with the police.., the MFA of Switzerland. and the Legation of the US1.

Silberschein stated he had acted 'only for a charitable end' and 'in full cooperation with the Polish diplomatic authorities in Switzerland'. . Silberschein also testified to have obtained a number of passports from the consulates of Peru, Honduras and Haiti. After the arrest of Silberschein, counsel Stefan Ryniewicz successfully intervened in his defense with police chief Heinrich Rothmund.

== Legacy and later life ==
It is estimated that the actions of the Ładoś Group have saved the lives of hundreds of people – mostly Polish and Dutch Jews who survived as holders of Paraguay's passports after Paraguay – pressured by Poland and the Holy See recognized the validity of the latter.

In the case of Silberschein, this number should also include some of the survivors thanks to other passports, mostly Honduran ones. The role of the Legation of Poland in producing and obtaining the latter is unclear.

After the war Silberschein remained in Geneva, where he married Fanny Schulthess-Hirsch, the Director of the International Committee for the Placement of Intellectual Refugees. He died on December 30, 1951, in Geneva and is buried in the local Jewish cemetery.

== See also ==
- Chaim Yisroel Eiss
