= Aleksander Ładoś =

Polish politician and diplomat

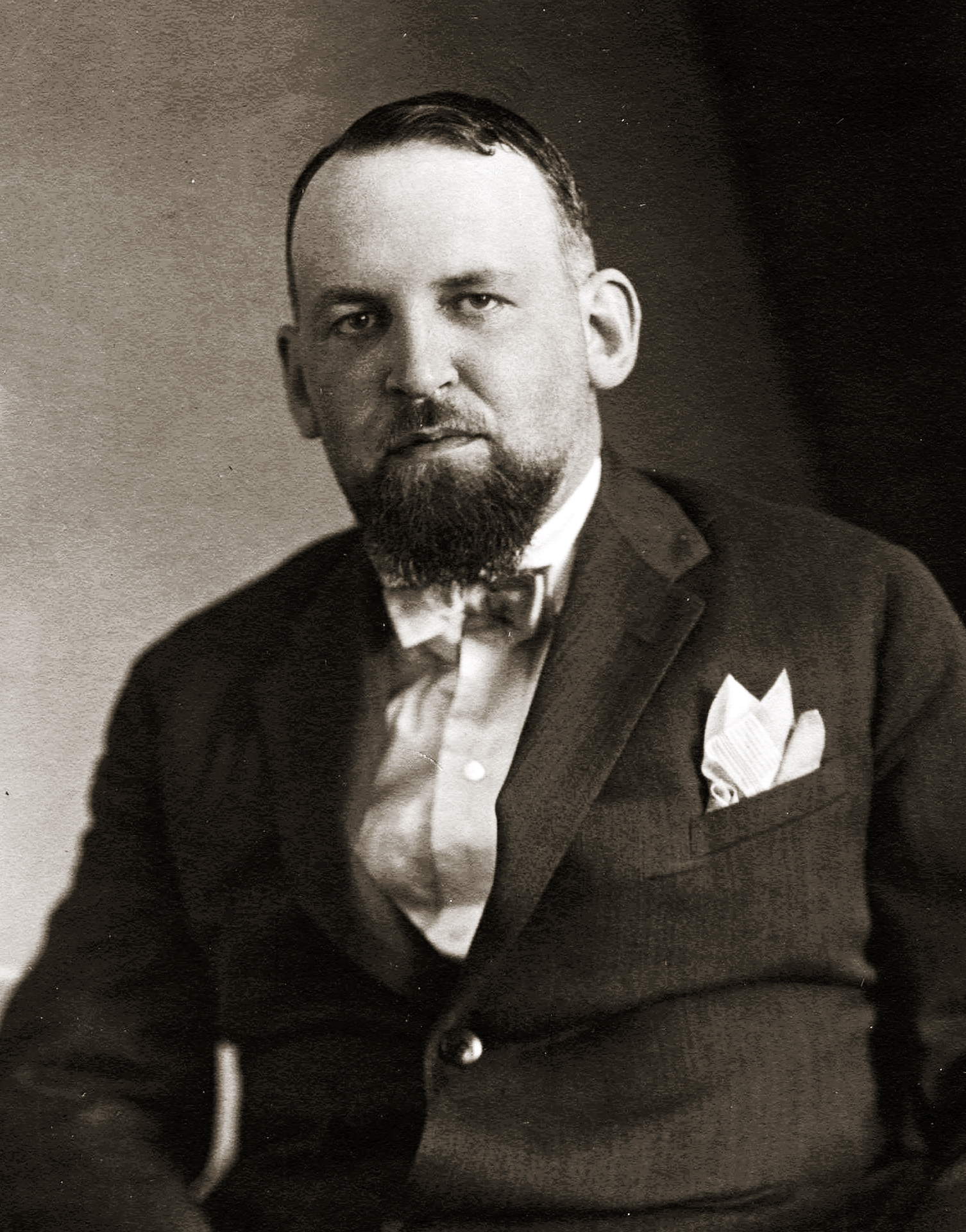
- Born: 27 December 1891; Lwów, Austro-Hungary
- Died: 29 December 1963 (aged 72); Warsaw, Poland
- Resting place: Powązki Cemetery, Warsaw
- Education: University of Lviv
- Occupations: diplomat; author
- Known for: World War I, Polish-Bolshevik War and the Holocaust rescue
- Honours: Officer of the Order of Polonia Restituta Virtus et Fraternitas, Poland Commander of the Order of the Three Stars, Latvia Grand Officers of the Order of the Crown, Romania Grand Officers of the Order of St. Sava, Yugoslavia

Aleksander Wacław Ładoś [alɛ'ksandɛr 'wadoɕ] (27 December 1891 – 29 December 1963) was a Polish politician and diplomat, who 1940–45 headed the Legation of Poland to Switzerland. Ładoś was a member and de facto leader of the Ładoś Group, also known as Bernese Group, a secret action by the Polish diplomats and Jewish organizations who helped save several hundred Jews from the Holocaust by providing them with illegal Latin American, mostly Paraguayan passports.

== Early life ==
Aleksander Wacław Ładoś was born in Lwów, Austro-Hungary (now Lviv, Ukraine). He was the younger son of Jan Ładoś, a postal clerk, and Albina née Kalous. Ładoś graduated from IV Classical Gymnasium in Lwów. In 1913 he joined the Polish People's Party "Piast" getting to know its leaders Wincenty Witos and Jan Dąbski. After the outbreak of the World War I he joined the Polish Eastern Legion. Exiled by the Austro-Hungarian authorities, Ładoś escaped to Switzerland and continued his interrupted studies in Lausanne being politically active in the Polish diaspora at the same time.

Ładoś came back to newly independent Poland in spring 1919 to join the Polish diplomatic service. Until spring 1920 he served as plebiscite delegate at Cieszyn Silesia, Spiš and Orava. Finally, the voting aimed to regulate the border between Poland and Czechoslovakia was never held and a final line was set up at the Spa Conference in Belgium. Since April 1920 Ładoś worked in the headquarters of the Polish MFA in Warsaw and shortly became head of its Press Department.

In 1920–1921, Ładoś served as secretary of the Polish delegation to the peace talks with the Soviet Russia in Minsk and Riga which decided about future borders of the Second Polish Republic. After the war, Ładoś became head of the Central European Department at the MFA and 9 October 1923 he was nominated minister plenipotentiary to Latvia. Political enemy of Józef Piłsudski, Ładoś lost his post after the coup d’état in May 1926 but quickly was nominated Consul General of Poland to Munich. Shortly after Józef Beck became vice-minister of foreign affairs, Ładoś was dismissed and discharged from the service.

Between 1931 and 1939, he worked as editor and columnist, writing for various opposition newspapers. He became a vocal critic of Józef Beck, who in the meantime replaced August Zaleski as foreign minister. Ładoś believed Poland should seek rapprochement with the Soviet Union as a possible ally against Nazi Germany and advocated closer cooperation with Czechoslovakia. Politically close to pro-democratic and pro-French Front Morges, he befriended General Władysław Sikorski, who would later become Prime Minister of the Polish Government in Exile, Commander-in-Chief of the Polish Armed Forces.

After the German invasion of Poland, Ładoś headed to Romania to join the Polish Government in Exile as a minister without portfolio between 3 October and 7 December 1939. Between 24 May 1940 and July 1945 he was Envoy Extraordinary and Minister Plenipotentiary of Poland to Switzerland. Shortly after his nomination, Switzerland became fully encircled by the Axis Powers and the Vichy France. Due to the German pressure, Ładoś failed to deliver his credential letters and enjoyed a minor status of chargé d'affaires.

=== Ładoś Group and Holocaust rescue operation ===
During his de facto ambassadorial post in Bern, Ładoś headed secret operation “Passport Issues” aimed to provide Jews in German-occupied Poland with Latin American passports strictly co-operating with representatives of the Jewish organizations in Switzerland. The blank passports were bought between May 1940 and Autumn 1943 from the honorary consul of Paraguay Rudolf Hüggli and filled out by Ładoś’ sub-ordinates, consul Konstanty Rokicki and sometimes also by a Polish-Jewish diplomat Juliusz Kühl.

Ładoś himself intervened directly with the Swiss Federal Counselor Marcel Pilet-Golaz to turn a blind eye to the illegal procedure. Other people included in the clandestine Ładoś Group included Ładoś’ deputy counsellor Stefan J. Ryniewicz and Jews Chaim Eiss and Abraham Silberschein, members of Jewish organizations whose main task was to smuggle lists of beneficiaries and copies of illegally-obtained passports between Bern and German-occupied Poland. Bearers of such passports were not sent to the Nazi death camps but instead interred in detention camps in Vittel, France or Bergen-Belsen, Germany. According to Zbigniew Parafianowicz and Michał Potocki at least 400 of them survived the war. Ładoś also successfully urged in January 1944 the Polish Government in exile to help obtain official recognition of the passports by Paraguay – the fact that finally happened in February 1944. The Polish Legation under Ładoś also enabled the Sternbuchs, Montreux-based Jewish family to use Polish cables and send notes to the members of the New York Jewish diaspora to inform them about on-going Holocaust.

=== Later life and death ===
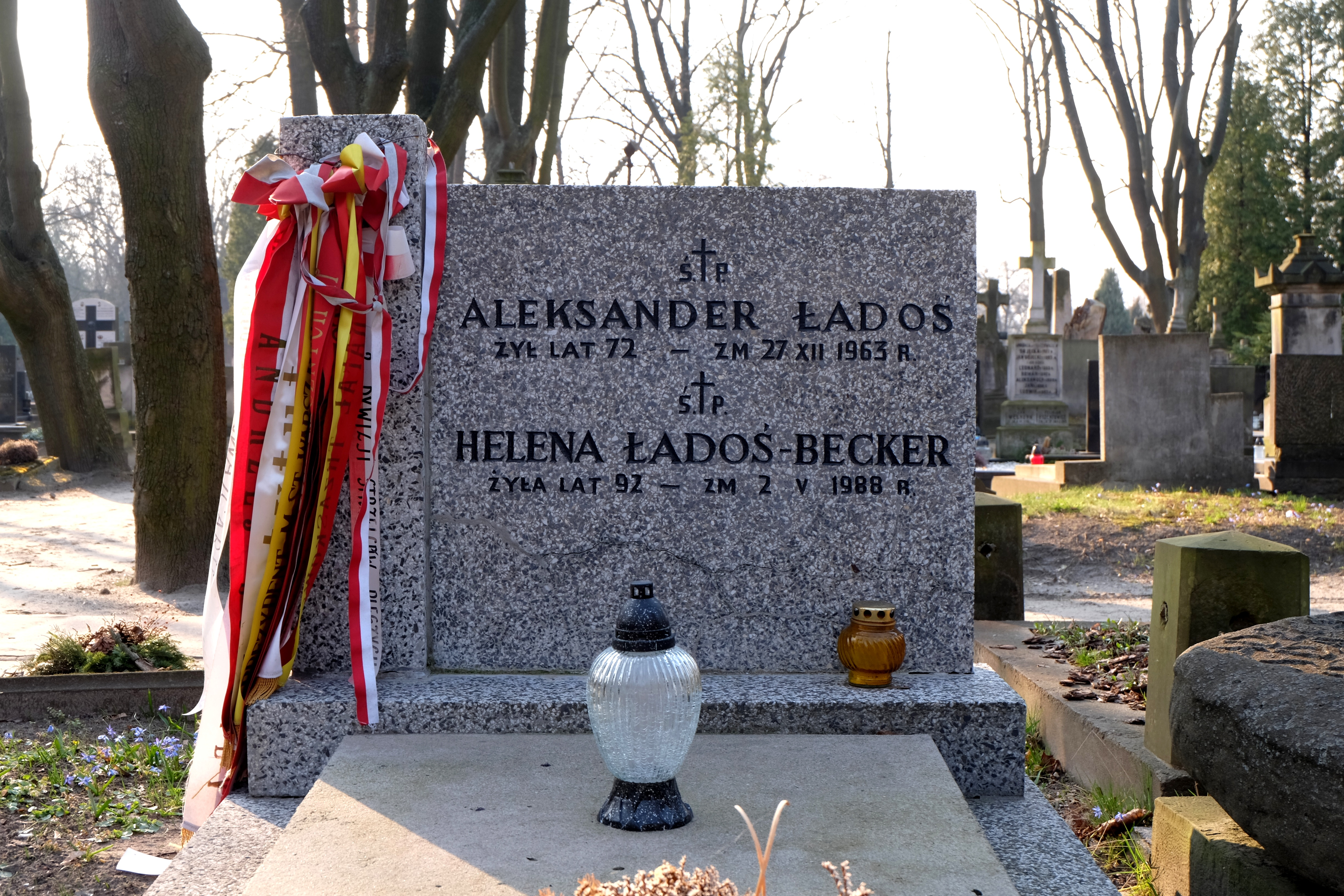
Ładoś grave at Powązki Cemetery

In July 1945 Ładoś officially supported the coalition Government in Poland and resigned as an envoy. Instead of coming back to Poland, he decided to stay in Switzerland, where he acted as a special envoy of the legal opposition PSL-party and its leader Stanisław Mikołajczyk. By Autumn 1946 he moved to Clamart near Paris. He came back to Poland in July 1960 being already seriously ill. Ładoś died in Warsaw, 29 December 1963, and was buried at Powązki Cemetery.

He left three tomes of unpublished and unfinished memoirs.

=== Yad Vashem controversy ===
In April 2019 the Yad Vashem granted the title of Righteous Among the Nations to Konstanty Rokicki and offered "appreciation" to Aleksander Ładoś and Stefan Ryniewicz arguing that Rokicki headed the Ładoś Group. The document erroneously called Ładoś and Ryniewicz "consuls". The decision sparked outrage and frustration among the family members of the two other late Polish diplomats, and among survivors. Thirty one of them signed an open letter to Yad Vashem. Rokicki's cousin refused to accept the medal until two other Polish diplomats, Rokicki's superior are recognized as Righteous Among The Nations, too. Polish Ambassador to Switzerland Jakub Kumoch who contributed to the discovery of Rokicki also refuted the Yad Vashem's interpretation stating that Rokicki worked under Ładoś and Ryniewicz. Eldad Beck of Israel Hayom suggested that this decision was politically inspired and related to the worsening of Israel-Poland relations due to the controversy over the Amendment to the Act on the Institute of National Remembrance.

== Honours ==
- Officer of the Order of Polonia Restituta, Poland
- Virtus et Fraternitas, Poland (2019)
- Commander of the Order of the Three Stars, Latvia
- Grand Officers of the Order of the Crown, Romania
- Grand Officers of the Order of St. Sava, Yugoslavia
- Congressional Gold Medal, United States (2024)
