= Oleksandra Vaseyko =

- Олександра Васейко
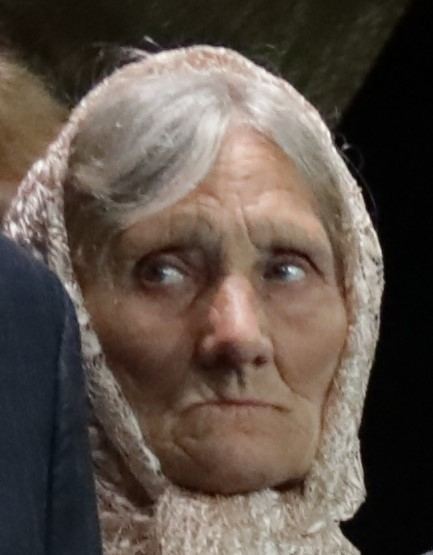
- Born: 1946 (age 79–80)
- Occupation: farmer
- Honours: Virtus et Fraternitas Medal

Oleksandra Vaseyko née Lukashko (Ukrainian: Олександра Васейко, born 1946) is a Ukrainian farmer, awarded with Virtus et Fraternitas Medal.

Before 1939, Kalennyk Lukashko, Oleksandra’s father, was in good relations with his Polish neighbours. During the World War II, Kalennyk has been providing aid to three Poles, hidden in a nearby forest, who had survived the Volhynia massacre. Discovering a few days later they had been murdered, he buried them. When Oleksandra Vaseyko was 6 years old, he showed her their resting place. For the next seventy years she has been keeping alive the memory of the buried, looking after the graves. She was also helping Polish archeologists in uncovering the mass burial sites of Poles murdered in Wola Ostrowiecka and Ostrówki.

In appreciation of her effort, in 2019, Vaseyko was awarded with Virtus et Fraternitas Medal. She received the honour from the President Andrzej Duda during the event at the Polish Theatre in Warsaw.

Vaseyko has been working her whole life as a farmer in village Sokil, Liuboml Raion.
