= Zofia Zielińska =

Polish historian (born 1944)

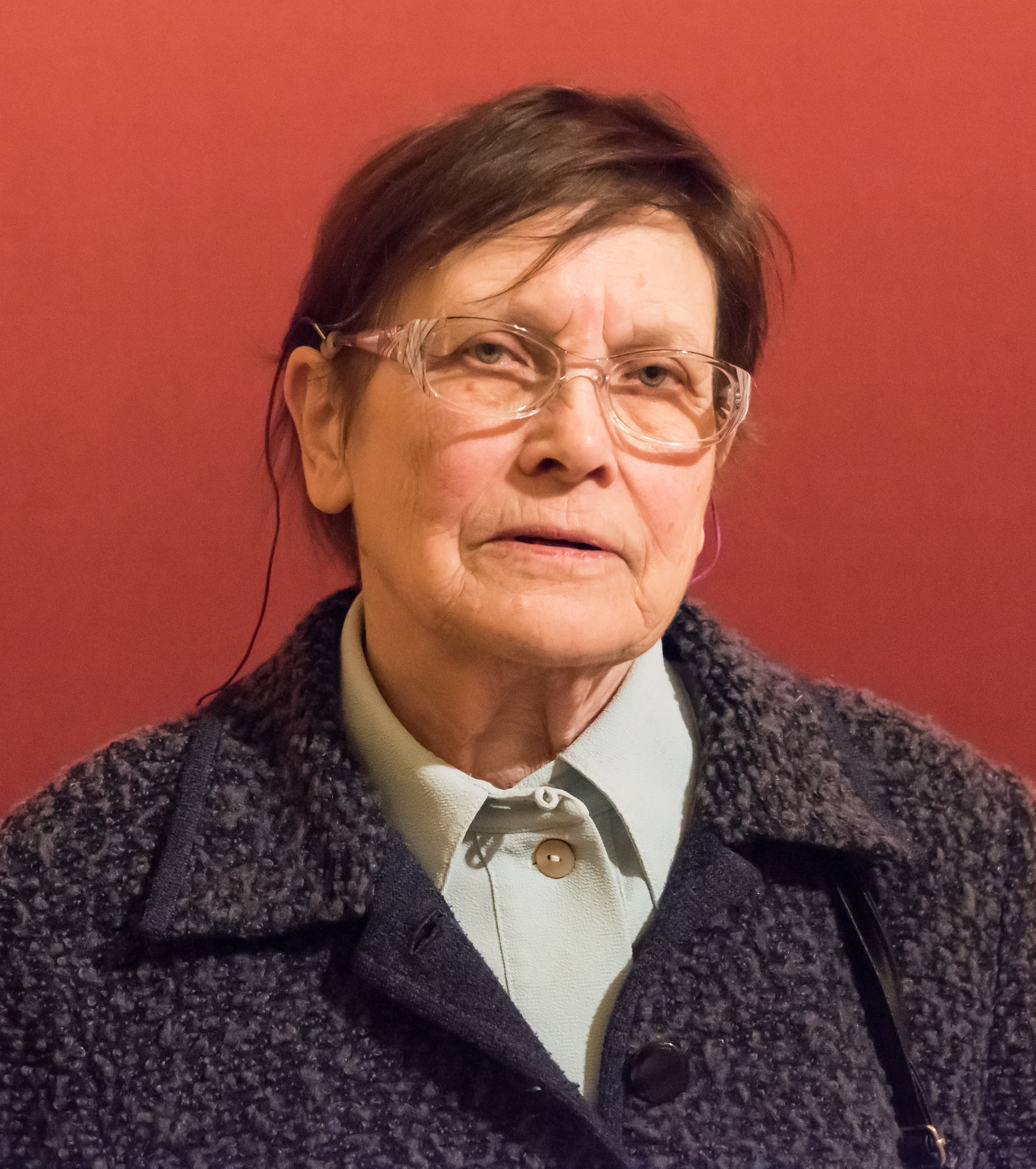
- Zofia Zielińska, 2023
- Born: 8 April 1944 (age 82); Lviv, Ukrainian SSR, Soviet Union
- Occupation: Historian

Academic background
- Education: University of Warsaw

Zofia Zielińska (born 8 April 1944) is a historian specializing in modern history and 18th century, professor, from 1993 until 1996 deputy director of the Institute of History of the University of Warsaw.

== Biography ==
In 1968 she graduated from the University of Warsaw. From that same year she was employed at the Institute of History of the University of Warsaw. In 1977 she obtained doctorate. In 1989 she obtained habilitation. She was deputy director (from 1990 until 1993), head of the Department of Modern History and member of the scientific council of the Institute of History of the University of Warsaw. She was a member of the Biographical Committee of the Polish Academy of Arts and Sciences. Her research interests include the reign of Stanisław August Poniatowski. She supervised four doctoral dissertations. Her doctoral stundents include Urszula Kosińska.

She became chairwoman of the Pilecki Institute Board and member of the Jacek Maziarski Prize jury. She was a member of the Editorial Committee of the Polish Biographical Dictionary from 2016 to 2019.

== Works ==
- Walka „Familii” o reformę Rzeczypospolitej 1743–1752. 1983.
- Ostatnie lata Pierwszej Rzeczypospolitej. 1986.
- Republikanizm spod znaku buławy: publicystyka Seweryna Rzewuskiego z lat 1788–1790. 1988.
- Kołłątaj i orientacja pruska u progu Sejmu Czteroletniego. 1991.
- „O sukcesyi tronu w Polszcze” 1787–1790. 1991.
- Studia z dziejów stosunków polsko-rosyjskich w XVIII wieku. 2001.
- Polska w okowach „systemu północnego” 1763–1766. 2012.
- Korespondencja Stanisława Augusta z Katarzyną II i jej najbliższymi współpracownikami (1764–1796). 2022. Volumes 1 & 2.

== Accolades ==
- Knight's Cross of the Order of Polonia Restituta (2010)
- Officer's Cross of the Order of Polonia Restituta (2023)
