= Juliusz Kühl =

Polish diplomat (1913–1985)

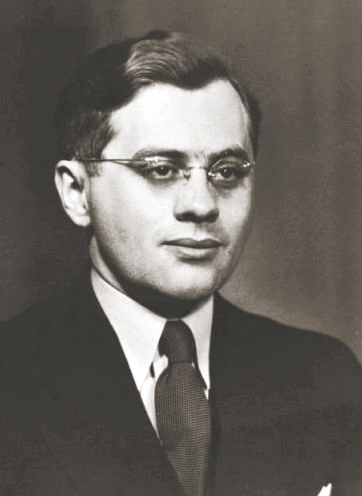
Juliusz Kühl

Juliusz Kühl also known as Julius or Yehiel Kühl (June 24, 1913 – February 13, 1985) was a Polish diplomat, Holocaust rescuer and – after World War II – Canadian construction businessman. Kühl was a member of the Ładoś Group also known as the Bernese Group and he is particularly known for his role in the production of false Latin American passports by the Polish Legation in Bern, Switzerland, thanks to which between several hundred and several thousand Jews in German-occupied Poland and the Netherlands survived the Holocaust.

== Early life ==
Juliusz Kühl was born shortly before the World War I in Sanok, southern Poland, which at that time was a part of Austro-Hungarian province of Galicia, into an orthodox Jewish family. When he was five years old Sanok became part of the Second Polish Republic and he himself – its citizen.

According to Mark MacKinnon he was sent at the age of nine to live with his uncle in Zürich because his father had died when he was young, and his mother wanted him to get a good education. Polish scholar Agnieszka Haska quotes Kühl's unpublished autobiographical note and claims he entered the University of Zurich to study economics, the subject he obtained a PhD in 1939.

In 1943 he married Yvonne Weill. The couple had two daughters and two sons. His oldest daughter, Janine, married Israel Weinstock, a businessman from Colombia S.A., and the younger daughter married Israel Singer, who, between 1986 and 2001 served as Secretary General of the World Jewish Congress.

== Holocaust rescue operation and "passport" affair ==
In March 1940 Kühl was employed in the Legation of Poland to Switzerland and Liechtenstein as an auxiliary employee. After the German and Soviet invasion of Poland and their subsequent occupation, the Legation remained loyal to the Polish government-in-exile headed by general Władysław Sikorski which pledged to continue the struggle against the Axis powers.

Soon Kühl's superior, minister Tytus Komarnicki, was replaced by Aleksander Ładoś, former member of the Polish government in exile, who would later on become Kühl's protector and top collaborator and – after the war – personal friend and business partner. Kühl was tasked with working with Polish refugees coming in massive numbers from occupied France, Belgium and the Netherlands, vast majority of whom were Jews and Poles of Jewish descent escaping from Nazi persecution.

Starting in 1941 Kühl and his superiors Stefan Ryniewicz and Konstanty Rokicki supervised the illegal market of Latin American passports bought by Jewish organizations for Jews in occupied Poland. The documents were bought from the consuls and honorary consuls of, among others, Honduras, Haiti and Bolivia or received gratis from the consulate of El Salvador.

A particular case was the honorary consul of Paraguay, the Bernese notary Rudolf Hügli, who did not produce passports himself, but rather sold blank passes to the Legation of Poland.

Consul Konstanty Rokicki would enter by hand the names and personal details of their beneficiaries – Polish and Dutch Jews who could thus claim they were citizens of neutral countries and were largely considered exempt from deportations to German Nazi-concentration camps. Particular help was provided to people inside the Warsaw Ghetto.

Funds to acquire the documents were raised mostly by World Jewish Congress represented by Abraham Silberschein and Agudath Yisrael and the leader of its Swiss branch Chaim Eiss. In 1943, the Swiss police broke the ring and brought Hügli, Kühl, Eiss and Silberschein in for questioning. In September the Federal Council took a decision not to recognize Kühl's status as an 'employee of the Polish diplomatic mission'.

Probably by December 1942, the Gestapo was aware that most Latin American passports were part of a larger conspiracy and may have been falsified.

The Swiss police identified Kühl and Rokicki as top perpetrators. A report signed by Federal Councillor Edmund von Steiger on 21 July 1943 stated the following:

According to the records available, Messrs Konstanty Rokicki, a vice-consul at the Polish Diplomatic Mission in Berne, and Dr. Julius Kühl, employed at the same Diplomatic Mission at the time, were also instrumental in arranging a significant number of inaccurate citizenship certificates for Polish Jews in the Germany-occupied territory. Mr Rokicki holds a blue card issued by you. Mr Kühl's status was that of a tolerated foreigner, to whom a time limit for 'preparation of the departure' was granted, in combination with a ban on any gainful employment or taking up any work, in March 1940, when he was employed as a consular service assistant by the Polish Diplomatic Mission. We kindly request you to verify whether you should not issue a firm warning to Mr Rokicki in an adequate manner, and further request Mr Kühl's dismissal from the service of the Polish Diplomatic Mission.

In January 1943, while being interrogated by the police, Kühl admitted his part in the production of false passports and claimed that Paraguayan passports had been already in use in 1939, during which time they served to enable influential Polish Jews to leave the Soviet occupation zone.

Let me start by saying that I was not involved in this matter of my own volition, but by order of my superior, Consul Rokicki, and Legation Councillor Ryniewicz. The question, how we could obtain foreign passports for Polish citizens arose for the first time after Poland had come under German and Russian occupation, in late 1939 and early 1940. Primarily, the issue at hand was to evacuate from the Russia-occupied part of Poland certain persons about whom we were concerned. We were able to do this through Consul Hügli, who provided us with Paraguayan passports for such persons. The passport forms would on each occasion be collected from Mr Hügli and then filled out by Consul Rokicki, and subsequently returned to Consul Hügli for signature. The latter was carried out by myself on most occasions. For the issuance of the passports, we would pay Mr Hügli the amounts between 500 and 2,000 francs, depending on the case and the number of persons. Neither the Diplomatic Mission nor the Consulate nor myself have benefited from this activity in any way.

Aleksander Ładoś refused to dismiss him and tried to extend his status. He also intervened in Kühl's defense with the Swiss Foreign Minister Marcel Pilet-Golaz. After the passport operation ended, the Polish government in exile granted Kühl in January 1944 full diplomatic status and the minor rank of attaché.

According to Michal Potocki and Zbigniew Parafianowicz, the whole Polish Legation including Kühl contributed to issuing 4000 passports and saved the lives of 400 people. Agudat Yisrael estimated the number of rescued people at 'many hundred'.

== Later life and emigration ==
After the Communist take-over in Poland after the war, Kühl, Ładoś, Ryniewicz and Rokicki left the foreign service and remained in Switzerland. All but Rokicki, tried a business activity together. Ładoś and Kühl were also believed to be politically linked to the Polish Peasant Party, the only non-Communist opposition allowed between 1945 and 1947. After the fiasco of their business they split and migrated to different countries. Later on Kühl would often come back to Switzerland for business trips.

At the end of the 1940s, Kühl migrated first to New York City and after a short period moved to Canada where he lived for decades in Toronto, where running a successful construction company. In 1980 he moved to Miami where he died five years later from chronic obstructive pulmonary disease, an illness he had suffered for many years. Shortly after that his private archive was donated to the United States Holocaust Memorial Museum. Juliusz Kühl practically never spoke in public about his role in the passport affair neither did much to commemorate his former colleagues. However he gave much credit to Aleksander Ładoś to whom he referred as 'the real saviour'.

== Controversies ==
The role of Kühl in filling out the passports is uncertain. MacKinnon claims he participated in the procedure along Rokicki, but it seems of little probability given that Kühl himself admitted the main fraud had been generally perpetrated by his Polish superior. Most of the found Paraguayan passports contain the same hand-writing which seems to belong to Rokicki rather than Kühl. Also the leaders of Jewish organizations referred most frequently to Rokicki as their focal point. It is indisputable however that both played an important role in producing the passports and having them smuggled while Ryniewicz and Ładoś secured diplomatic coverage for their actions.

The details of a big part of activities of the Ładoś Group remains unknown because they had conspiratory character and Ładoś did not inform the Polish government in exile about the details, probably out of fear of de-conspiring.

== Recognition ==
Being a Jew Dr. Kühl is not eligible to be declared Righteous among the Nations by Yad Vashem. Yad Vashem's declared policy is not to provide meaningful recognition, even in a possible new category, to Jews who rescued Jews, regardless of the number of people their activism saved. The stated reason is that Jews had an obligation to save fellow Jews and don't deserve recognition.

Dr. Kühl is however widely recognized as one of the heroes of the Jewish resistance to the Holocaust. His name appeared together with the ones of Ładoś, Rokicki and Ryniewicz in a thank you letter sent by Agudath Yisrael World Organization to the Polish government-in-exile.
