= Tadeusz Jeziorowski =

Polish historian and writer

- Born: 1944 (age 81–82)
- Education: Nicolaus Copernicus University in Toruń
- Occupation: historian

Tadeusz Romuald Jeziorowski (born in 1944) is a Polish historian and writer specialising in weaponry, uniforms and orders.

A graduate of the Kraków High School of Fine Arts, he earned an MA in Connoisseurship Studies from the Faculty of the Fine Arts in Nicolaus Copernicus University in Toruń. Since 1968 he worked in the Military Museum of Wielkopolska (part of the National Museum, Poznań). He was its head since 1973, and also had the title of curator between 1991 and 2012.

He is a member of the team for addressing and providing opinions on matters related to orders and distinctions, heraldry and vexillology in the Presidential Office of the Republic of Poland and in the Heraldic Commission at the Ministry of the Interior and Administration.

He is also a part of the Association of Old Arms and Uniforms Amateurs (Stowarzyszenie Miłośników Dawnej Broni i Barwy), the Polish Heraldry Society (Polskie Towarzystwo Heraldyczne), German BDOS (Deutsche Gesellschaft für Ordenskunde e. V.); founder and honorary president of the Society of Former Soldiers and Friends of the 15th Regiment of Poznań Lancers (Towarzystwo b. Żołnierzy i Przyjaciół 15. Pułku Ułanów Poznańskich).

He was awarded Knight's and Officer's Cross of the Order of the Rebirth of Poland (2008 and 2017).

Author of the first Polish monograph of the pallasch sword: Brać się do pałasza!, Poznań 2001, of a text on uniforms Mundury wojewódzkie Rzeczypospolitej Obojga Narodów (with A. Jeziorkowski, illustrations) Warszawa 1992, and of a catalogue of the collection of the Military Museum of Wielkopolska Order Wojenny Virtuti Militari (with J. Łuczak) Poznań 1993, and of a monograph of the orders during napoleonic era Ordery napoleońskie. Ordery generałów polskich w epoce napoleońskiej (with R. Morawski, illustrations) Warszawa 2018.

He has written numerous articles on the above topics, including one on the history of the Order of Saint Stanislaus Bishop and Martyr 1765–1795 in the catalogue Praemiando Incitat, Order Świętego Stanisława 1765-1831, Warszawa 2016.

He has set up many thematic exhibitions, e.g., he acted as initiator and co-author of the show For the Homeland and the Nation. 300 Years of the Order of the White Eagle at the Warsaw Royal Castle in 2005.

== Works ==
- Źródła i materiały do dziejów Powstania Wielkopolskiego i wojsk wielkopolskich 1918–1919 (Poznań, 1978)
- Broń biała w zbiorach miłośników dawnej broni (Poznań, 1978)
- Mundury wojewódzkie Rzeczypospolitej Obojga Narodów (Warszawa, 1992)
- Dziękujemy Wam Polacy. Odznaczenia państw alianckich dla żołnierzy polskich (Poznań, 1995)
- Brać się do pałasza! Pałasz polski i obcy XVII-XX w. (Poznań, 2001)
- Na straży pamięci. W 40. rocznicę otwarcia pierwszej po wojnie stałej ekspozycji w Wielkopolskim Muzeum Wojskowym (Poznań, 2003)
- Nad nami Orzeł Biały... Znaki państwa w wojsku. Symbolika państwowa w Wojsku Polskim XVIII-XX w. (Poznań, 2003)
- Ordery Prezydenta Rzeczypospolitej Polskiej (Warszawa, 2003)
- Pieśń ujdzie cało. Śpiewnik. Przybyli ułani... (Poznań, 2006, 2007, 2008)
- The Napoleonic Orders, Orders of the Polish Generals in the Napoleonic Era. Ordery napoleońskie. Ordery generałów polskich w epoce napoleońskiej Warszawa, 2018)
