= Pilecki Institute =

Polish government history institute

Pilecki Instytut
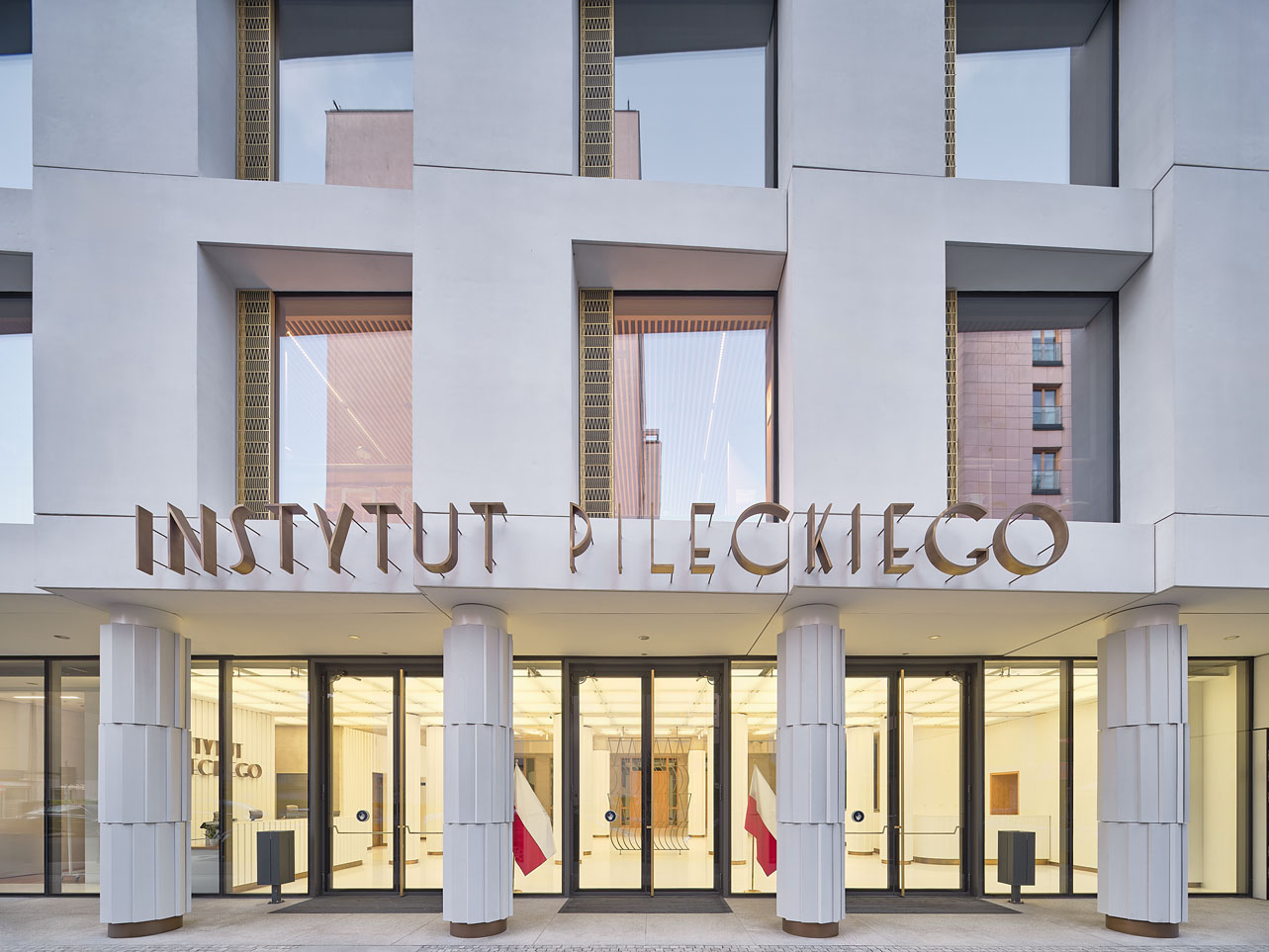
- Formation: 2017
- Headquarters: Warsaw, Poland; Berlin, Germany
- Location: 82 Sienna Street
- Region served: Republic of Poland
- Official language: Polish
- President: Karol Madaj
- Budget: 75 million PLN
- Website: instytutpileckiego.pl/en

The Pilecki Institute (Polish: Instytut Pileckiego; full name Instytut Solidarności i Męstwa imienia Witolda Pileckiego, lit. Witold Pilecki's Institute of Solidarity and Courage) is a Polish government institution in care of preserving the memory, documenting and researching the historical experiences of Polish citizens and increasing awareness regarding totalitarianism in the 20th century. Its patron is Witold Pilecki.

The organization has been called the Polish Yad Vashem. In 2019, the Pilecki Institute opened its headquarters in Berlin.

== Activities ==
=== Research ===
The Pilecki Institute's researchers participate in interdisciplinary research projects devoted to totalitarianism and the history of Poland in the 20th century. The Institute gathers researchers who specialize in political science, sociology, history and Jewish studies. It gathers and publishes documents concerning its scope of interests, provides support for scientific research, especially connected to the victims of Nazism and Communism. The studies are concerned primarily with World War II and its consequences. The Institute also translates works on totalitarianism into Polish.

=== Education ===
The Institute carries out educational projects and events.

=== Commemoration ===
The Pilecki Institute commemorates persons who were murdered for providing aid and assistance to Poles and Jews during the World War II. Under “Called by Name” project were honoured e..g. Jadwiga Długoborska, Lucyna Radziejowska. On recommendation of the Institute, the President of Poland bestows the Virtus et Fraternitas Medal, the Eastern Cross, and the Western Cross.

== Organisation ==
The Pilecki Institute was established by the Polish Parliament on 9 November 2017, and following year incorporated the Witold Pilecki Center for Totalitarian Studies. On 2017 the institute was given a one-time lump sum of PLN 75 million (roughly $18.7 million) by the Polish parliament, which was used to launch the institute and cover operational expenses through 2019. In 2020, the institute received a specified-user subsidy of PLN 20 million (roughly $5 million) from the Ministry of Culture and National Heritage. Its aim is to analyse the importance for the history of the 20th century of the Nazi and Soviet totalitarian regimes and the global consequences of their actions. The Institute is supervised by the Minister of Culture and National Heritage.

In August 2025, the director Krzysztof Ruchniewicz was replaced by Karol Madaj. A consultative and advisory body to the Director of the Institute is the Council of Memory, whose members are appointed by the Minister of Culture and National Heritage. Amongst them are, e.g.: Grzegorz Berendt, Sławomir Dębski, Jan Ołdakowski, Albert Stankowski. The chairperson is prof. Zofia Zielińska.

The Institute is divided into:

- Department of Archives
- Center for Totalitarian Studies
- Education Department
- Promotion and Production Team
- Personnel Department
- Research Department
- Publishing Department
- Personal Data Controller
- Accounting Department
- Competitive Tendering
- Film Projects Team
- Translation Team
- Library
- Press Office
- Administrative Department
- Raphael Lemkin Center for Documenting Russian Crimes in Ukraine
- Berlin Branch

== See also ==
- Laws against Holocaust denial
