= Jakub Kumoch =

Polish journalist and diplomat

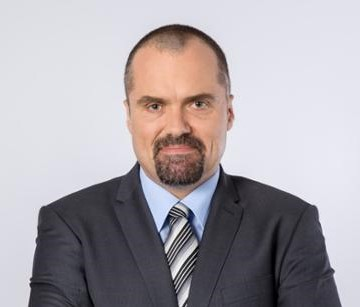

Poland Ambassador to Switzerland
- In office 2016–2020
- Appointed by: Andrzej Duda
- President: Johann Schneider-Ammann; Doris Leuthard; Alain Berset; Ueli Maurer; Simonetta Sommaruga
- Preceded by: Jaromir Sokołowski
- Succeeded by: Iwona Kozłowska

Poland Ambassador to Turkey
- In office 2 March 2020 – 13 July 2021
- Appointed by: Andrzej Duda
- President: Recep Tayyip Erdoğan
- Preceded by: Maciej Lang
- Succeeded by: Maciej Lang

Head of the International Policy Bureau
- In office 14 July 2021 – 12 January 2023
- Appointed by: Andrzej Duda
- Preceded by: Krzysztof Szczerski
- Succeeded by: Marcin Przydacz

Poland Ambassador to China
- In office 6 September 2023 – 30 October 2026
- Appointed by: Andrzej Duda
- Preceded by: Wojciech Zajączkowski

Personal details
- Born: 16 November 1975 (age 50) Warsaw, Poland
- Spouse: Joanna Kułakowska-Kumoch
- Children: 2
- Education: University of Warsaw
- Profession: Political scientist, journalist, diplomat

Jakub Radomir Kumoch (born 16 November 1975, Warsaw) is a Polish political scientist, journalist and diplomat. He served as the Head of the International Policy Bureau in the Chancellery of the President of Poland, and as the Polish ambassador to Switzerland (2016–2020), Turkey (2020–2021), and China (2023–2026).

== Life ==
Kumoch has graduated from international relations (M.A., 1999) and Turkology (M.A., 2001) at the University of Warsaw. In 2006 he defended at the Jagiellonian University his Ph.D. thesis on European Union election observation missions; his doctoral advisor was Krzysztof Szczerski. Besides Polish and Turkish, he speaks English, French, Croatian, Spanish, Russian, German, and Arabic languages.

Kumoch started his professional career at the Centre for Eastern Studies as an analyst on Balkan states (2000–2001). For the next ten years he has been covering international relations as a journalist. Following his position of Polish Press Agency foreign correspondent in Moscow, he was working for Przekrój weekly (2005–2006) and Dziennik Polska-Europa-Świat daily (2006–2009). Since 2010 he has been working again as an analyst on international relations at the Polish Institute of International Affairs (2010), the Sobieski Institute (2011–2013). Between 2011 and 2016 he was also engaged in the EU Election Observation Missions (EUEOMs) as an expert and press officer. In 2015 he was invited by the President Andrzej Duda to the National Development Council – Security, Defense, Foreign Policy Section.

On 14 October 2016 he was nominated Poland ambassador to Switzerland, accredited also to Liechtenstein. Within a week he presented his diplomatic credentials. As an ambassador, in 2017, he contributed to the discovery and publicity of Polish diplomats in Switzerland saving European Jews from Holocaust (Ładoś Group). In 2019, he was awarded by the Minister of Culture for "preserving the cultural heritage abroad". He co-authored list of names of 3262 holders of passports issued by Ładoś Group, which in December 2019 was presented at the Pilecki Institute in Warsaw.

According to Lucien Scherrer of the Neue Zürcher Zeitung, "within [Swiss] diplomatic and political circles Kumoch is seen as an agitator in service of the PiS government." Councilman Hans-Peter Portmann is quoted as saying: "The fact that an ambassador intervenes in the press constantly is unusual. An emissary should adhere to local customs, including respect for the freedom of expression." Councilman Claude Janiak of the Switzerland-Poland Group, is also quoted: "I wonder if it's part of [Kumoch's] job to foster a domestic Polish political dispute."

His service has been highly appreciated in Poland though, being accepted by both ruling and opposing parties of Polish Sejm for next ambassador term, in Turkey. He received nomination on 2 March 2020. He presented his credentials to the President Recep Tayyip Erdoğan on 14 July 2020. He ended his term on 13 July 2021, and following day took the post of the Head of the International Policy Bureau of the Chancellery of the President of the Republic of Poland. On 6 September 2023, he began his term as the ambassador to China. On 30 October 2026, he resigned from his position of ambassador to China due to the Suspension of Bogdan Święczkowski.

Kumoch is married to Joanna Kułakowska-Kumoch with two children.

== Honours ==
- 2021 – Commander of the Order of Makarios III, Cyprus
- 2022 – Order of Prince Yaroslav the Wise, Third Class, Ukraine
- 2023 – Knight's Cross of the Order of Polonia Restituta, Poland
- 2023 – Cross of Recognition, 2nd class, Latvia
- 2023 – Grand Commander of the Order for Merits to Lithuania, Lithuania
- 2025 – Order of the Cross of Terra Mariana, 3rd Class, Estonia

== Works ==
- Kumoch, Jakub; Formuszewicz, Ryszarda (2010). The Practice of Appointing the Heads of EU Delegations in the Wake of Council Decision on the European External Action Service (PDF). Warszawa: Polski Instytut Spraw Międzynarodowych. ISBN 978-83-89607-97-3.
- Kumoch, Jakub; Maniewska, Monika; Uszyński, Jędrzej; Zygmunt, Bartłomiej (2020). The Ładoś List. Pilecki Institute. ISBN 978-83-66340-18-3.
