= Mark MacKinnon =

Canadian journalist (born 1974)

- Born: 1974 (age 51–52)
- Education: Carleton University
- Occupation: Journalist
- Employer: The Globe and Mail
- Notable work: The New Cold War: Revolutions, Rigged Elections and Pipeline Politics in the Former Soviet Union, The China Diaries
- Awards: National Newspaper Award (7 times), Canada's print Journalist of the Year (2016)

Mark MacKinnon (born 1974) is a Canadian journalist and senior international correspondent for The Globe and Mail. A graduate of Carleton University in Ottawa, Ontario, he is an eight-time winner of the National Newspaper Award, Canada's top reporting prize, and was named Canada's print Journalist of the Year for 2016.

Now based in London, his previous postings include Beijing, Moscow, and the Middle East.

MacKinnon first book, The New Cold War: Revolutions, Rigged Elections and Pipeline Politics in the Former Soviet Union was published in 2007 by Random House in Canada, and by Carroll and Graf in the United States. It is "a nuanced study that demonstrates the continuity of conflict between the U.S. and Russia", and discusses the emergence of a new "Cold War" in the 2000s (decade).

He is also the author of The China Diaries, an e-book of MacKinnon's travels by train through the China that was published in 2013.

He has twice been named to Foreign Policy magazine's Top 100 global "Twitterati" for his commentary via the social media network Twitter.

MacKinnon has interviewed Burmese opposition leader Aung San Suu Kyi, Israeli President Shimon Peres, Ukrainian President Viktor Yushchenko, Ukrainian Prime Minister Yulia Tymoshenko, South Korean President Lee Myung-bak, Lebanese Prime Minister Saad Hariri, Georgian President Mikhail Saakashvili and former Thai prime minister Thaksin Shinawatra, as well as King Abdullah II of Jordan and former Soviet foreign minister as well as Georgian President Eduard Shevardnadze.
