= Chaim Yisroel Eiss =

Israeli activist (1876–1943)

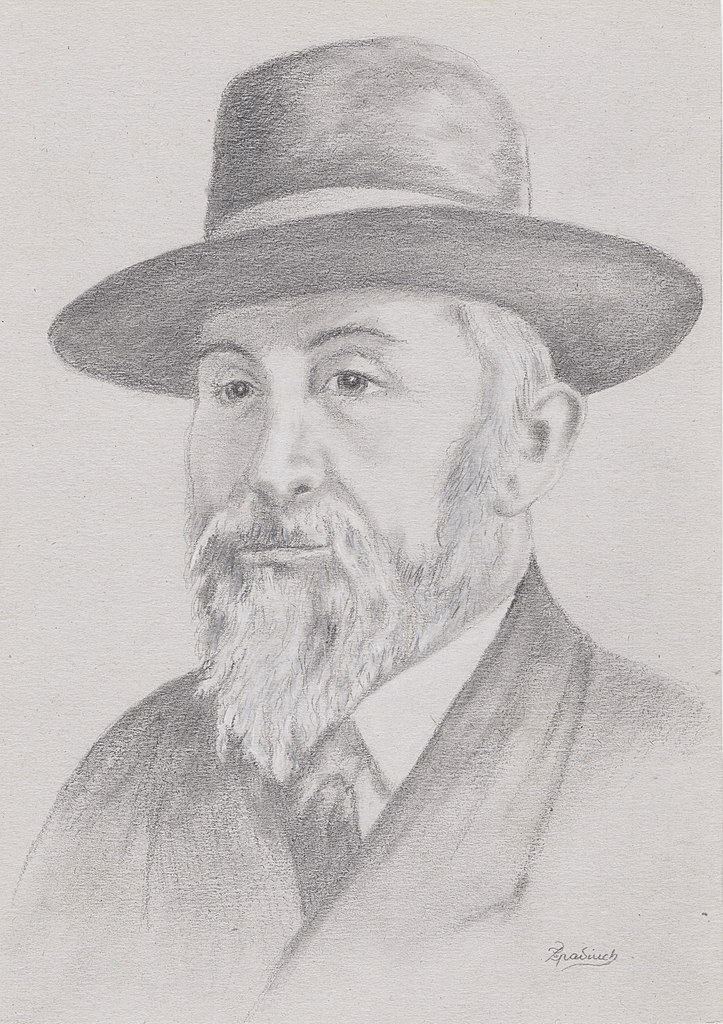
Chaim Eiss

Chaim Yisroel Eiss (1876–1943, Hebrew: חיים ישראל אייז) was an Agudath Israel activist and writer. He also was among the founders of the Agudath Israel in 1912. During the First World War, Rebbe Eiss set up an aid system that located refugees, found out what they most needed and raised the required funds. During World War II, he worked on behalf of Jews in Nazi-occupied Europe and he was a member of the Ładoś Group also called as Ładoś Group.

== Personal life ==
Chaim Yisroel Eiss was born in Galicia, Austria-Hungary, in the town of Ustrzyki Dolne, now Poland; as one of 11 children of Rebbe Moshe Nissan Eiss and his wife Myria née Kessler. He was the only one of the children to survive an epidemic of diphtheria, an illness for which there was no treatment at the time. After the death of his other children, his father Rebbe Moshe Nissan Eiss took young Yisroel to the Sadigora Rebbe who blessed him and gave him an additional name, Chaim.

Eiss got no secular education. ‘I taught myself to write at a later age. I did not learn any trade either as my father wanted me to be a rabbi. For this reason, I then only completed Jewish religious studies’, he declared in 1943. In 1900, he moved to Switzerland and came to Zurich where he wanted to study. However, having no money, he started working as a door-to-door vendor. Later, in 1901, Eiss acquired his own shop.

Later on he married Adele Holles. The couple had 10 children.

== Agudath Israel ==
Eiss was a founding member of Agudath Israel and one of its main activists. He operated mainly behind the scenes and every proposal that was brought to the presidium for ratification was first presented to him.

During the First World War, Eiss set up a large aid system that located refugees, found out what they most needed and raised the required funds.

Eiss was entrusted by the leading Rabbis of the time with the directorship of all Switzerland-based Agudath Israel funds. These included the Orphan Aid Fund, the Land of Israel Yeshiva Fund and the Polish and Lithuanian Yeshiva Fund. He received contributions from all over the world and transferred the money to the recipients.

Eiss was a writer and published the Agudath Israel publication Haderech. He wrote all the articles himself and was personally responsible for printing and distributing the paper. He was also a regular contributor to the then Agudath Israel weekly Kol Yisrael, printed in Jerusalem, and used it to make his opinions known to the population of Eretz Israel.

== Rescue work ==
Eiss lived in Switzerland, which was neutral during World War II, and was therefore able to serve as the link between people living in countries under Nazi occupation and residents of the free world. He transferred information and requests for help to the Agudath Israel offices in London, New York City, and Istanbul, and facilitated the transfer of money, passport photographs, and requests to locate family members into Europe. He received hundreds of letters from Nazi-occupied countries and was one of the first to obtain a clear picture of the atrocities that were being carried out there.

Interrogated by the Swiss police in May 1943, Eiss admitted to having worked together with Polish diplomats to illegally obtain a fake passport from a corrupted honorary consul of Paraguay Rudolf Hugli. ‘I always contact the Polish Consul, Rokicki, who then, in turn, contacts the Paraguayan Consul, Hügli in Bern, who issues the documents. Then, presumably, Rokicki must pay some amount to Mr Hügli. The certificates are then be sent to Poland in the original, whereas the passports are to be photocopied and the copies notarised’, . Eiss would then obtain the copies of the passports, presumably through the Polish-Jewish diplomat Juliusz Kühl, right-hand of the envoy of Poland Aleksander Ładoś and have them smuggled into the German occupation zone. The letters contained certificates showing that the person concerned had been granted Paraguayan citizenship. In many cases, Eiss provided the names of his acquaintances as the senders so as to make sure that his own name was not revealed to the censorship authorities. ‘All the addressees were religious Jewish persons living in Warsaw and Będzin’, he declared.

The bearers of the Paraguayan passports would be placed in the internment camps in occupied France and Germany rather than sent to the extermination camps. Thus, hundreds of them managed to survive the war. In 1944, Poland forced Paraguay to temporarily recognize the validity of the passports.

The communications system that Eiss set up to have the documents smuggled was complex and not without danger. The unofficial postal service was conducted by non-Jewish residents of the occupied countries, people he referred to in his letters as pure Aryans, and the phraseology that was used was designed to pass muster with the censors while being understood by the intended recipients. An example of this can be seen in a letter that he wrote to Agudath Israel's American branch at an early stage, before people were yet aware of the Nazis’ extermination efforts. It stated: "Our friend Rav Alexander Susha Friedman wrote me a letter of thanks on behalf of Mr. Mekayem Nefesh" and that "Mr. Chalelei Raav (Dying of Hunger) is a permanent guest at our friends' homes."

Sometimes he was able to be more explicit, and he wrote to the London branch of Agudath Israel, "The situation of our French brethren and even more, of our Polish brethren, is getting worse each day. In Warsaw the Jews are dying at a rate of 6,000 per month, mostly from hunger."

Hundreds, maybe thousands of people were prevented from dying by Eiss's efforts, but these were not the only people he helped. Thousands of Jews trapped in occupied Europe were given hope by his activities.

Eiss died in November 1943 survived by his wife and eight out of ten children.

Eiss Archive created in 2019 is named after him.

== Political views ==
Eiss was critical of the Mizrachi movement. He wrote that Mizrachi did not teach its children the Torah but instead had a new religion, that of labor. According to Eiss, the only reason that Mizrachi affiliated itself to the Zionists was in order to receive monetary gain.

Eiss was also critical of the secular educational system. He wrote that "Forty thousand of the children of our people are being educated in schools which are such that the children will not turn out to be apikorsim (heretics), because they will not know enough Torah to be able to rebel against it, but will turn out to be ignoramuses."

== See also ==
- Ładoś Group
- Yad Vashem
