= Rescue of Jews during the Holocaust =

Help offered to Jews to escape the Holocaust

During World War II, some individuals and groups helped Jews and others escape the Holocaust conducted by Nazi Germany.

The support, or at least absence of active opposition, of the local population was essential to Jews attempting to hide but often lacking in Eastern Europe. Those in hiding depended on the assistance of non-Jews. Having money, social connections with non-Jews, a non-Jewish appearance, perfect command of the local language, determination, and luck played a major role in determining survival. Jews in hiding were hunted down with the assistance of local collaborators and rewards offered for their denunciation. The death penalty was sometimes enforced on people hiding them, especially in eastern Europe, including Poland. Rescuers' motivations varied on a spectrum from altruism to expecting sex or material gain; it was not uncommon for helpers to betray or murder Jews if their money ran out.

Jews were hidden or saved by non-Jews throughout Nazi-occupied Europe. The Catholic Church and Vatican opposed the systemic murder of Jews, and in Italy the Mussolini government refused to deport Jews or participate in their mass murder. Many diplomats were involved in efforts to help Jews escape, such as by providing documents that allowed safe transit.

Since 1953, Israel's Holocaust memorial, Yad Vashem, has recognized 26,973 people as Righteous among the Nations. Yad Vashem's Holocaust Martyrs' and Heroes' Remembrance Authority, headed by an Israeli Supreme Court justice, recognizes rescuers of Jews as Righteous among the Nations to honor non-Jews who risked their lives during the Holocaust to save Jews from extermination by Nazi Germany.

== By country ==
=== Albania ===
Unlike many other Eastern European countries under Nazi occupation, Albania—which has a mixed Muslim and Christian population and a tradition of tolerance—became a safe haven for Jews. At the end of 1938, Albania was the only remaining country in Europe that still issued visas to Jews through its embassy in Berlin. Following the Nazi occupation of Albania, the country refused to hand over its small Jewish population to the Germans, sometimes even providing Jewish families with forged documents. During the war, about 2,000 Jews sought refuge in Albania, and many of them took shelter in rural parts of the country where they were protected by the local population. At the end of the war, Albania's Jewish population was greater than it was prior to the war, making it the only country in Europe where the Jewish population increased during World War II. Out of two thousand Jews in total, only five Albanian Jews perished at the hands of the Nazis. They were discovered by the Germans and subsequently deported to Pristina.

Between February and March in 1939, King Zog I of Albania granted asylum to 300 Jewish refugees before being overthrown by the Italian fascists in April the same year. When the Italians requisitioned the Albanian puppet government to expel its Jewish refugees, the Albanian leaders refused, and in the following years, 400 more Jewish refugees found sanctuary in Albania.

Refik Veseli was the first Albanian to be awarded the title Righteous Among the Nations, having declared afterwards that betraying the Jews "would have disgraced his village and his family. At minimum his home would be destroyed and his family banished". On 21 July 1992, Mihal Lekatari, an Albanian partisan from Kavajë, was recognized as Righteous Among the Nations. Lekatari is noted for stealing blank identity papers from the municipality of Harizaj and distributing identity papers with Muslim names on them to Jewish refugees. In 1997, Albanian Shyqyri Myrto was honored for rescuing Jews, with the Anti-Defamation League's Courage to Care Award presented to his son, Arian Myrto. In 2006, a plaque honoring the compassion and courage of Albania during the Holocaust was dedicated in The Holocaust Memorial Park in Sheepshead Bay in Brooklyn, New York, with the Albanian ambassador to the United Nations in attendance. (Note: In 1943, the Nazis asked Albanian authorities for a list of the country's Jews. They refused to comply. "Jews were then taken from the cities and hidden in the countryside", Goldfarb explained. "Non-Jewish Albanians would steal identity cards from police stations [for Jews to use]. The underground resistance even warned that anyone who turned in a Jew would be executed." ... "There were actually more Jews in the country after the war than before—thanks to the Albanian traditions of religious tolerance and hospitality.")

During the war, some parts of Kosovo and Macedonia which were occupied by the Axis powers were annexed to Albania, and an estimated 600 Jews were captured in these territories, and consequently killed.

=== Belgium ===
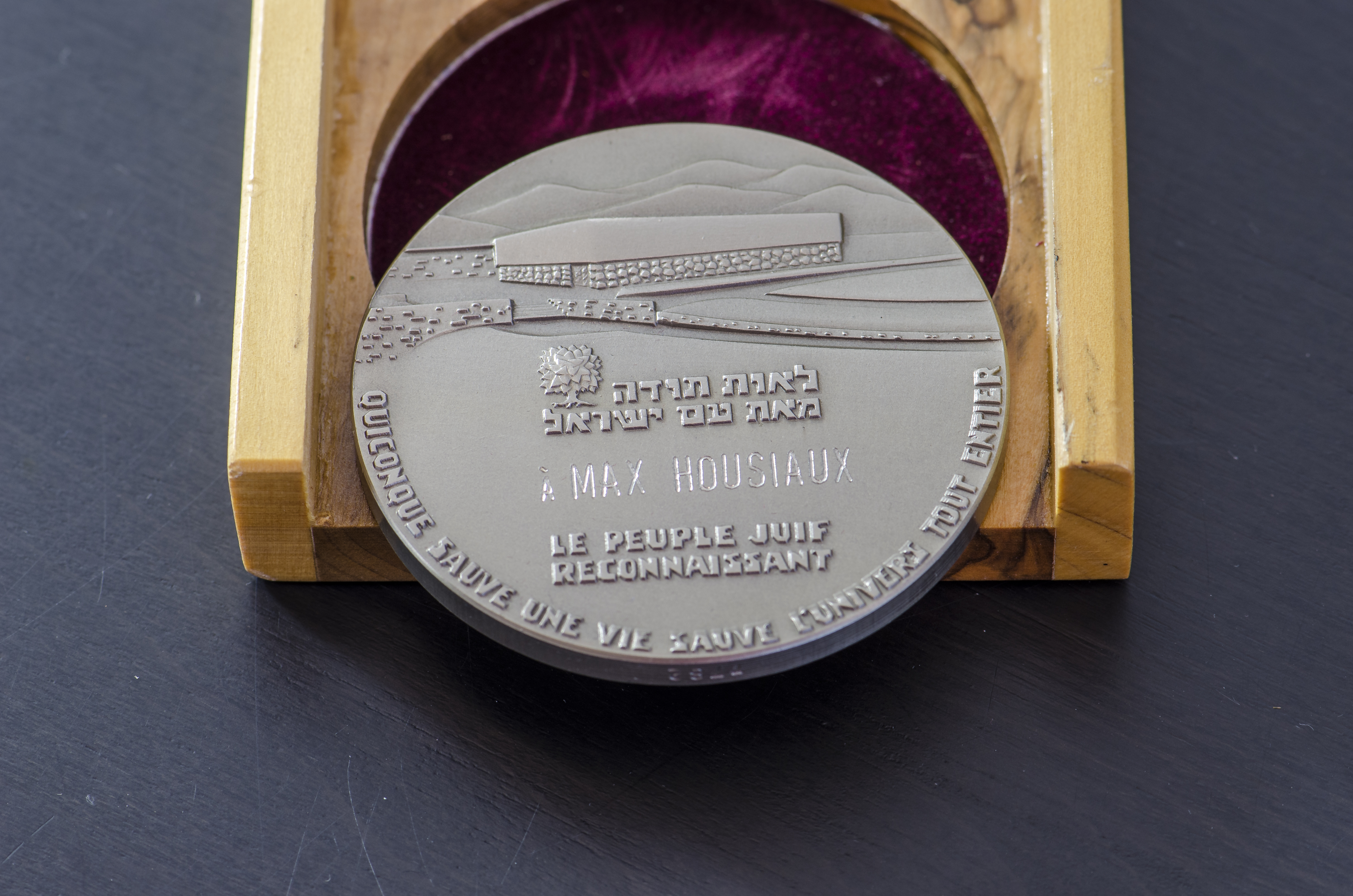
Yad Vashem medal in Kazerne Dossin, awarded to Max Housiaux.

In April 1943, members of the Belgian resistance held up the twentieth convoy train to Auschwitz, and freed 231 people. Several local governments did all they could to slow down or block the registration processes for Jews they were obliged to perform by the Nazis. Many people saved children by hiding them away in private houses and boarding schools. Of the approximately 50,000 Jews in Belgium in 1940, about 25,000 were deported—though only about 1,250 survived. Marie and Emile Taquet sheltered Jewish boys in a residential school or home. Bruno Reynders was a Belgian monk who defied the Nazis, as he implemented the directive of Pope Pius XII to save the Jews, worked with local orphanages, Catholic Nuns and the Belgian Underground to forge false identities for Jewish children whose parents willingly gave them up in an attempt to spare their lives faced with deportation to the death camps. Pere Bruno risked his life for his values and to save the lives of an estimated 400 Jewish children and is honored as a Righteous Gentile at Yad Vashem.

L'abbé Joseph André is another Catholic priest who secured safe hiding places with Belgian families, orphanages and other institutions for Jewish children and adults.

=== Bolivia ===
Between 1938 and 1941, around 20,000 Jews were given visas for Bolivia under an agricultural visa program. Although most moved on to the neighboring countries of Argentina, Uruguay and Chile, some stayed and created a Jewish Community in Bolivia.

=== Bulgaria ===
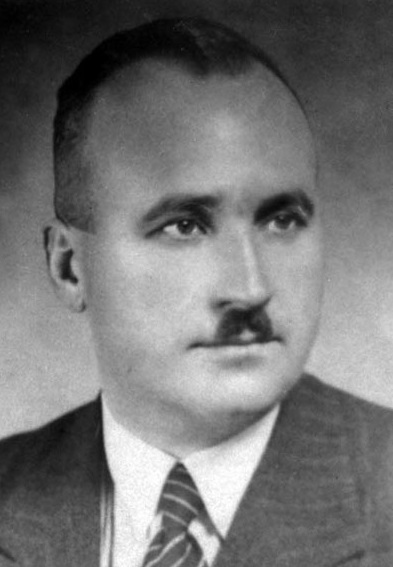
Dimitar Peshev of Bulgaria's National Assembly prevented the deportation of Bulgaria's 48,000 Jews.

Bulgaria joined the Axis powers in March 1941 and took part in the invasion of Yugoslavia and Greece. The Nazi-allied government of Bulgaria, led by Bogdan Filov, fully and actively assisted in the Holocaust in occupied areas. On Passover 1943, Bulgaria rounded up the great majority of Jews in Greece and Yugoslavia, transported them through Bulgaria, and handed them off to German transport to Treblinka, where almost all were murdered. The Nazi-allied government of Bulgaria deported a higher percentage of Jews (from the areas of Greece and the Republic of Macedonia) than did the German occupiers in the region. In Bulgarian-occupied Greece, the Bulgarian authorities arrested the majority of the Jewish population on Passover 1943. The territories of Greece, Macedonia and other nations occupied by Bulgaria during World War II were not considered Bulgarian—they were only administered by Bulgaria, but Bulgaria had no say as to the affairs of these lands.

The active participation of Bulgaria in the Holocaust however did not extend to its pre-war territory and after various protests by Archbishop Stefan of Sofia and the interference of Dimitar Peshev, the planned deportation of the Bulgarian Jews (about 50,000) was stopped. Deportation to the concentration camps was denied. Bulgaria was officially thanked by the government of Israel despite being an ally of Nazi Germany.

Dimitar Peshev was the Deputy Speaker of the National Assembly of Bulgaria and Minister of Justice during World War II. He rebelled against the pro-Nazi cabinet and prevented the deportation of Bulgaria's 48 000 Jews. He was aided by the strong opposition of the Bulgarian Orthodox Church. Although Peshev had been involved in various anti-Semitic legislation that was passed in Bulgaria during the early years of the War, the government's decision to deport Bulgaria's 48 000 Jews on 8 March 1943 was too much for Peshev. After being informed of the deportation, Peshev tried several times to see Prime Minister Bogdan Filov but the prime minister refused. Next, he went to see Interior Minister Petar Gabrovski insisting that he cancel the deportations. After much persuasion, Gabrovski finally called the governor of Kyustendil and instructed him to stop preparations for the Jewish deportations. By 5:30 p.m. on 9 March, the order was cancelled. After the war, Peshev was charged with anti-Semitism and anti-Communism by the Soviet courts, and sentenced to death. However, after an outcry from the Jewish community, his sentence was commuted to 15 years imprisonment, though released after just one year. His deeds went unrecognized after the war, as he lived in poverty in Bulgaria. It was not until 1973 that he was awarded the title of Righteous Among the Nations. He died the same year.

=== China ===
Ho Feng Shan – Chinese Consul in Vienna started to issue visas to Jews for Shanghai, part of which during this time was still under the control of the Republic of China, for humanitarian reasons. Between 1933 and 1941, the Chinese city of Shanghai under Japanese occupation, accepted unconditionally over 18,000 Jewish refugees escaping the Holocaust in Europe, a number greater than those taken in by Canada, New Zealand, South Africa and British India combined during World War II. After 1943, the occupying Nazi-aligned Japanese ghettoised the Jewish refugees in Shanghai into an area known as the Shanghai ghetto. Many of the Jewish refugees in Shanghai migrated to the United States and Israel after 1948 due to the Chinese Civil War (1946–1950).

=== Denmark ===
The Jewish community in Denmark remained relatively unaffected by Germany's occupation of Denmark on 9 April 1940. The Germans allowed the Danish government to remain in office and this cabinet rejected the notion that any "Jewish question" should exist in Denmark. No legislation was passed against Jews and the yellow badge was not introduced in Denmark. In August 1943, this situation was about to collapse as the Danish government refused to introduce the death penalty as demanded by the Germans following a series of strikes and popular protests. The German empire forced the Danish government to shut down. During these events, German diplomat Georg Ferdinand Duckwitz tipped off Danish politician Hans Hedtoft that the Danish Jews would be deported to Germany following the collapse of the Danish government. Hedtoft alerted the Danish resistance and the Jewish leader C.B. Henriques informed the acting Chief Rabbi Marcus Melchior in the absence of the Chief Rabbi Max Friediger who had already been arrested as a hostage on 29 August 1943, urging the community to go into hiding in service on 29 September 1943. During the following weeks, more than 7,200 of Denmark's 8,000-strong Jewish communities were ferried to neutral Sweden hidden in fishing boats. A small number of Jews, some 450 in all, were captured by the Germans and shipped to Theresienstadt. Danish officials were able to ensure that these prisoners weren't shipped to extermination camps, and Danish Red Cross inspections and food packages ensured focus on the Danish Jews. Swedish Count Folke Bernadotte ensured their release and transport to Denmark in the final days of the war.

=== Finland ===
The government of Finland generally refused to deport Finnish Jews to Germany. It has been said that Finnish government officials told German envoys that "Finland has no Jewish Problem". However, the Secret Police ValPo deported 8 Jews in 1942 who were refugees seeking asylum in Finland. Moreover, it seems highly likely that Finland deported Soviet POWs, among them a number of Jews. The majority of Finnish Jews, however, were protected by the government's co-belligerence with Germany. Their men joined the Finnish army and fought on the front.

The most notable Finnish individual involved in aiding the Jews was Algoth Niska (1888–1954). Niska was a smuggler during the Finnish prohibition but had run into financial troubles after its end in 1932, so when Albert Amtmann, an Austrian-Jewish acquaintance, expressed his concerns over his people's position in Europe, Niska quickly saw a business opportunity in smuggling Jews out of Germany. The modus operandi was quickly established. Niska would forge Finnish passports and Amtmann would acquire the customers, who with their new passports would be able to cross the border out of Germany. All in all, Niska falsified passports for 48 Jews during 1938 and earned 2,5 million Finnish marks ($890,000 or £600,000 in today's money) selling them. Only three of the Jews are known to have survived the Holocaust while twenty were certainly caught. The fates of the other twenty-five are not known. Involved in the operation with Niska and Amtmann were Major Rafael Johannes Kajander, Axel Belewicz and Belewicz's girlfriend Kerttu Ollikainen whose job was to steal the forms on which the passports were forged.

=== France ===
Père Marie-Benoît was a French Capuchin priest who helped smuggle approximately 4,000 Jews into safety from Nazi-occupied Southern France and subsequently was recognized by Yad Vashem as a Righteous among the Nations in 1966. The French town of Le Chambon-sur-Lignon sheltered several thousand Jews. The Brazilian diplomat Luis Martins de Souza Dantas illegally issued Brazilian diplomatic visas to hundreds of Jews in France during the Vichy Government, saving them from almost certain death. Si Kaddour Benghabrit, the religious head of the Islamic Center of France, helped more than a thousand Jews by providing forged identity papers to the Jews of Paris during the German occupation of France. He also managed to hide many Jewish families in the rooms of Paris Mosque as well as in the residencies and women's prayer areas.

=== Greece ===
The Foundation for the Advancement of Sephardic Studies and Culture writes "One cannot forget the repeated initiatives of the head of the Greek Christian Orthodox Metropolitan See of Thessaloniki, Gennadios, against the deportations, and most of all, the official letter of protest signed in Athens on March 23, 1943, by Archbishop Damaskinos of the Greek Orthodox Church, along with 27 prominent leaders of cultural, academic and professional organizations. The document, written in a very sharp language, refers to unbreakable bonds between Christian Orthodox and Jews, identifying them jointly as Greeks, without differentiation. It is noteworthy that such a document is unique in the whole of occupied Europe, in character, content and purpose".

The 275 Jews of the island of Zakynthos, however, survived the Holocaust. When the island's mayor, Loukas Karrer (Λουκάς Καρρέρ), was presented with the German order to hand over a list of Jews, Bishop Chrysostomos returned to the amazed Germans with a list of two names; his and the mayor's. Moreover, the Bishop wrote a letter to Hitler himself stating that the Jews of the island were under his supervision. In the meantime the island's population hid every member of the Jewish community. When the island was almost levelled by the great earthquake of 1953, the first relief came from the state of Israel, with a message that read "The Jews of Zakynthos have never forgotten their Mayor or their beloved Bishop and what they did for us."

The Jewish community of Volos, one of the most ancient in Greece, had fewer losses than any other Jewish community in Greece thanks to the timely and dynamic intervention and mobilization of the massive communist-leftist partisan movement of EAM-ELAS (National Liberation Front (Greece) – Greek People's Liberation Army) and the successful cooperation of the head of the Greek Christian Orthodox Metropolitan See of Demetrias Joachim and the chief rabbi of Volos, Moses Pesach for the evacuation of Volos from the Jewish people, after the events in Thessaloniki (displacement of the city's Jews to concentration camps).

Princess Alice of Battenberg and Greece, who was the wife of Prince Andrew of Greece and Denmark and the mother of Prince Philip, Duke of Edinburgh, and mother-in-law of Queen Elizabeth II of the United Kingdom, stayed in occupied Athens during the Second World War, sheltering Jewish refugees, for which she is recognized as "Righteous Among the Nations" at Yad Vashem. Although the Germans and Bulgarians deported a great number of Greek Jews, others were successfully hidden by their Greek neighbors.

82-year-old Simon Danieli traveled from Israel to his birthplace in Veria to thank the descendants of the people who helped him and his family escape Nazi persecution during World War II. Danieli was 13 in 1942 when his family—father Joseph, a grain merchant, mother Buena, and nine siblings—fled Veria to escape the increasingly frequent atrocities committed by Nazi forces against the city's Jews. They ended up in a small nearby village in Sykies, where the family was taken in by Giorgos and Panayiota Lanara, who offered them shelter, food and a hiding place in the woods, helped also by a priest, Nestoras Karamitsopoulos. The Nazis, however, soon stormed Sykies, where around 50 more Jews from Veria had also taken refuge. They questioned the priest about the whereabouts of the Jews, but when Karamitsopoulos refused to answer, they began raiding people's homes. They found Jews hidden in eight homes, and promptly set fire the houses. They also turned their wrath on the priest, torturing him and pulling out his beard, according to Danieli.

=== Italy ===
Despite Benito Mussolini's close alliance with Hitler, Italy did not adopt Nazism's genocidal ideology towards the Jews. The Nazis were frustrated by the Italian forces' refusal to co-operate in the roundups of Jews, and no Jews were deported from Italy prior to the Nazi occupation of the country following the Italian capitulation in September 1943. In Italian-occupied Croatia, the Nazi envoy Siegfried Kasche advised Berlin that Italian forces had "apparently been influenced" by Vatican opposition to German anti-Semitism. As anti-Axis feeling grew in Italy, the use of Vatican Radio to broadcast papal disapproval of race murder and anti-Semitism angered the Nazis. Mussolini was overthrown in July 1943, and the Nazis moved to occupy Italy, commencing a round-up of Jews. Although thousands were caught, the great majority of Italy's Jews were saved. As in other nations, Catholic networks were heavily engaged in rescue efforts. (Note: The situation in Italy was somewhat peculiar in that, notwithstanding Mussolini's proclamation against Jews, most Italians had no personal hatred against them. Liliana Picciotto, the historian of the archive of Fondazione Centro di Documentazione Ebraica Contemporanea (Foundation Center for the Contemporary Jewish Documentation) writes that of the 32,300 Jews living in Italy under German occupation, only 8,000 were arrested, whereas 23,500 escaped unharmed. She speculates that the overall percentage of Jews who survived in Italy owed this to the solidarity the persecuted found among the local population.)

In Fiume (northern Italy, today Croatian Rijeka), Giovanni Palatucci, after the promulgation of racial laws against Jews in 1938 and at the beginning of war in 1940, as chief of the Foreigners' Office, forged documents and visas to Jews threatened by deportation. He managed to destroy all documented records of some 5,000 Jewish refugees living in Fiume, issuing them false papers and providing them with funds. Palatucci then sent the refugees to a large internment camp in southern Italy protected by his uncle, Giuseppe Maria Palatucci, the Catholic Bishop of Campagna. Following the 1943 capitulation of Italy, Fiume was occupied by the Nazis. Palatucci remained as head of the police administration without real powers. He continued to clandestinely help Jews and maintain contact with the Resistance, until his activities were discovered by the Gestapo. The Swiss Consul to Trieste, a close friend of his, offered him a safe pass to Switzerland, but Giovanni Palatucci sent his young Jewish fiancée instead. Palatucci was arrested on 13 September 1944. He was condemned to death, but the sentence was later commuted to deportation to Dachau, where he died.

On 19 July 1944, the Gestapo rounded up the nearly 2000 Jewish inhabitants of the island of Rhodes, which had been governed by Italy since 1912. Of the approximately 2,000 Rhodesli Jews who were deported to Auschwitz and elsewhere, only 104 survived.

Giorgio Perlasca, who posed as the consul-general of Spain under the Spanish ambassador in Budapest, was able to put under his protection thousands of Jews and non-Jews destined to concentration camps.

The cycling champion Gino Bartali had hidden a Jewish family in his cellar and, according to one of the survivors, saved their lives in doing so. He also used his fame to carry messages and documents to the Italian Resistance and fugitive Jews. Bartali cycled from Florence through Tuscany, Umbria and Marche, many times traveling as far afield as Assisi, all the while wearing the racing jersey emblazoned with his name.

Calogero Marrone was the chief of the Civil Registry office in the municipality of Varese and issued hundreds of fake identity cards in order to save Jews and anti-fascists. He was arrested after an anonymous tip-off and died in the Dachau concentration camp.

Martin Gilbert wrote that, in October 1943, with the SS occupying Rome and determined to deport the city's 5000 Jews, the Vatican clergy had opened the sanctuaries of the Vatican to all "non-Aryans" in need of rescue in an attempt to forestall the deportation. "Catholic clergy in the city acted with alacrity", wrote Gilbert. "At the Capuchin convent on the Via Siciliano, Father Benoit saved a large number of Jews by providing them with false identification papers [...] by the morning of October 16, a total of 4,238 Jews had been given sanctuary in the many monasteries and convents of Rome. A further 477 Jews had been given shelter in the Vatican and its enclaves." Gilbert credited the rapid rescue efforts of the Church with saving over four-fifths of Roman Jews.

Other Righteous Catholic rescuers in Italy included Elisabeth Hesselblad. She and two British women, Mother Riccarda Beauchamp Hambrough and Sister Katherine Flanagan have been beatified for reviving the Swedish Bridgettine Order of nuns and hiding scores of Jewish families in their convent. The churches, monasteries and convents of Assisi formed the Assisi Network and served as a safe haven for Jews. Gilbert credits the network established by Bishop Giuseppe Placido Nicolini and Abbott Rufino Niccaci of the Franciscan Monastery, with saving 300 people. Other Italian clerics honored by Yad Vashem include the theology professor Fr Giuseppe Girotti of Dominican Seminary of Turin, who saved many Jews before being arrested and sent to Dachau where he died in 1945; Fr Arrigo Beccari who protected around 100 Jewish children in his seminary and among local farmers in the village of Nonantola in Central Italy; and Don Gaetano Tantalo, a parish priest who sheltered a large Jewish family. Sister Marguerite Bernes collaborated with Prati parish priest Father Antonio Dressino to hide Jewish refugees. Of Italy's 44,500 Jews, some 7,680 were murdered in the Nazi Holocaust.

=== Japan ===
The Japanese government ensured Jewish safety in China, Japan and Manchuria. Japanese Army General Hideki Tōjō received Jewish refugees in accordance with Japanese national policy and rejected German protest. Chiune Sugihara, Kiichiro Higuchi, and Fumimaro Konoe helped thousands of Jews escape the Holocaust from occupied Europe.

=== Lithuania ===
According to the data available at Yad Vashem, by 1 January 2019, 904 rescuers of Jews in Lithuania were identified, whereas in the catalogue compiled by the Vilna Gaon State Jewish Museum, 2300 Lithuanians who rescued Jews are indicated, among them 159 members of clergy.

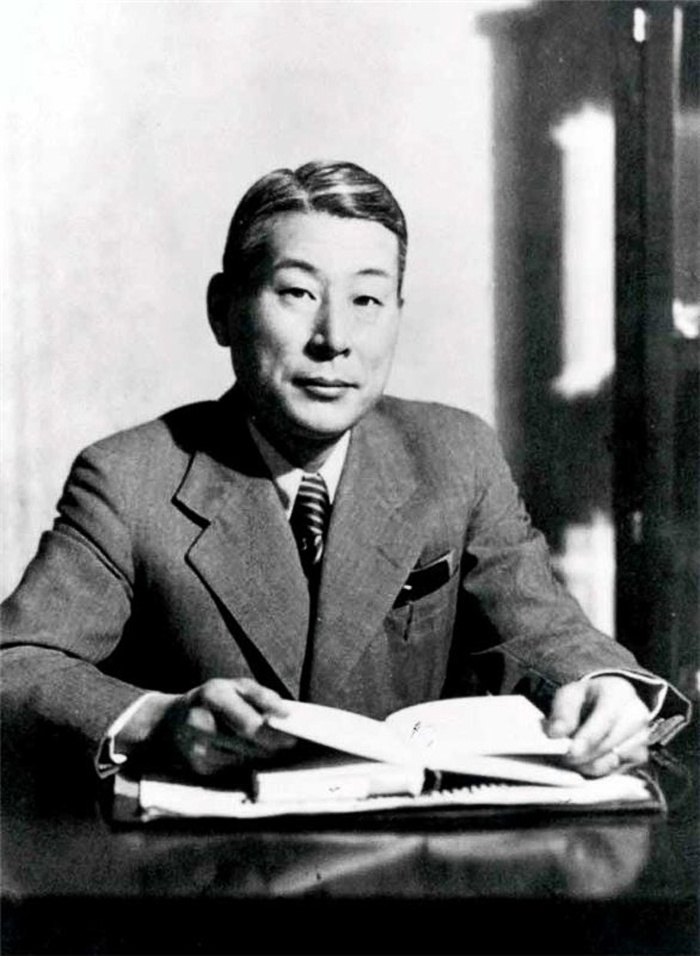
Chiune Sugihara, Japanese consul-general in Kaunas, in defiance of Japanese policy, issued thousands of visas to Jews. The last foreign diplomat to leave Kaunas, Sugihara continued stamping visas from the open window of his departing train. After the war, Sugihara was fired from the Japanese foreign service, ostensibly due to downsizing.

The Republic of Lithuania following the occupation of Poland by Nazi Germany and the Soviet Union in September 1939, accepted and accommodated in the country numbers of Polish and Jewish refugees as well as soldiers of defeated Polish army. Part of these refugees were later saved from the Soviets (and eventually from Nazis) by L. P. J. de Decker, Dutch Ambassador to the Baltic States in Riga, 1940. He removed from the required visa text the need to have the Governor of Curacao's approval to enter. This was a ruse to allow Jews to escape from Lithuania. He instructed, authorized honorary Dutch consul in Kovno, Lithuania Jan Zwartendijk to issue modified end visas to Jews in Lithuania. With the added help of Chiune Sempo Sugihara, Japanese consul-general in Kovno, thousands of Jews escaped from the Holocaust via Japan and then to Shanghai.

As well as in other countries rescuers from Lithuania came from different layers of society. The most iconic figures are librarian Ona Šimaitė, doctor Petras Baublys, writer Kazys Binkis and his wife journalist Sofija Binkienė, musician Vladas Varčikas, writer and translator Danutė Zubovienė (Čiurlionytė) and her husband Vladimiras Zubovas, doctor Elena Kutorgienė, aviator Vladas Drupas, doctor Pranas Mažylis, Catholic priest Juozapas Stakauskas, teacher Vladas Žemaitis, Catholic nun Maria Mikulska and others. In Šarnelė village (Plungė district) Straupiai family (Jonas and Bronislava Straupiai together with their neighbours Adolfina and Juozas Karpauskai) saved 26 people (9 families).

Citizens of Lithuania and foreign countries who rescue people on the territory of Lithuania and citizens of Lithuania abroad are awarded Life Saving Crosses. The President of Lithuania honors Jewish rescuers every year on the occasion of the National Memorial Day for the Genocide of Lithuanian Jews, which is marked on September 23 to commemorate the liquidation of the Vilna Ghetto on that day in 1943.

=== Netherlands ===
Based on its 1940 population of 9 million the 5,516 Jews rescued in the Netherlands represents the largest per capita number: 1 in 1,700 Dutch was awarded the Righteous Among the Nations medal. Notable rescuers include:

- Willem Arondeus, Dutch artist and resistance fighter who helped forge documents allowing Jewish families to flee the country
- Gertruida Wijsmuller-Meijer, who helped save about 10,000 Jewish children from Germany and Austria just before the outbreak of the war (Kindertransport) and on the last transport ship leaving the Netherlands to the UK in May 1940
- L. P. J. de Decker Dutch Ambassador to the Baltic States in Riga, 1940. He removed from the required visa text the need to have the Governor of Curacao's approval to enter. This was a ruse to allow Jews to escape from Lithuania. He instructed, authorized honorary Dutch consul in Kovno, Lithuania Jan Zwartendijk to issue modified end visas to Jews in Lithuania. With the added help of Chiune Sempo Sugihara, Japanese consul in Kovno, thousands of Jews escaped the Holocaust via Japan and then Shanghai.
- Jan Zwartendijk, who as a Dutch consular representative in Kaunas, Lithuania, at Dutch Ambassador L.P.J. deDecker's request issued modified Curacao visas used by between 6,000 and to 10,000 Jewish refugees.
- Those who hid and helped Anne Frank and her family, like Miep Gies.
- Caecilia Loots, a teacher and antifascist resistance member, who saved Jewish children during the war.
- Marion van Binsbergen helped save approximately 150 Dutch Jews, most of them children, throughout the German occupation of the Netherlands.
- Tina Strobos, rescued over 100 Jews by hiding them in her house and providing them with forged paperwork to escape the country.
- Jan van Hulst (18 December 1903 – 1 August 1975), instrumental in preventing Jews from being deported and murdered during the Holocaust.
- The participants of the so-called "Amsterdam dock strike" (better known as the February strike, about 300,000 to 500,000 people who on 25 and 26 February 1941 took part in the first strike against persecution of the Jews in Nazi-occupied Europe).
- The village of Nieuwlande (117 inhabitants) that set up a quota for residents to rescue Jews.

=== Norway ===
During the occupation of Norway by Nazi Germany, its Jewish community was subject to persecution and deported to extermination camps. Although at least 764 Jews in Norway were killed, over 1,000 were rescued with the help of non-Jewish Norwegians who risked their lives to smuggle the refugees out, typically to Sweden. As of January 2018, 67 of these individuals have been recognized by Yad Vashem as being Righteous Among the Nations. Yad Vashem has also recognized the Norwegian resistance movement collectively.

=== The Philippines ===
In a notable humanitarian act, Manuel L. Quezon, the first president of the Commonwealth of the Philippines, in cooperation with United States High Commissioner Paul V. McNutt, facilitated the entry into the Philippines of Jewish refugees fleeing fascist regimes in Europe, while taking on critics who were convinced by fascist propaganda that Jewish settlement is a threat to the country. Quezon and McNutt proposed to have 30,000 refugee families on Mindanao, and 40,000-50,000 refugees on Polillo. Quezon gave, as a 10-year loan to Manila's Jewish Refugee Committee, land beside Quezon's family home in Marikina. The land would house homeless refugees in Marikina Hall, dedicated on 23 April 1940.

=== Poland ===
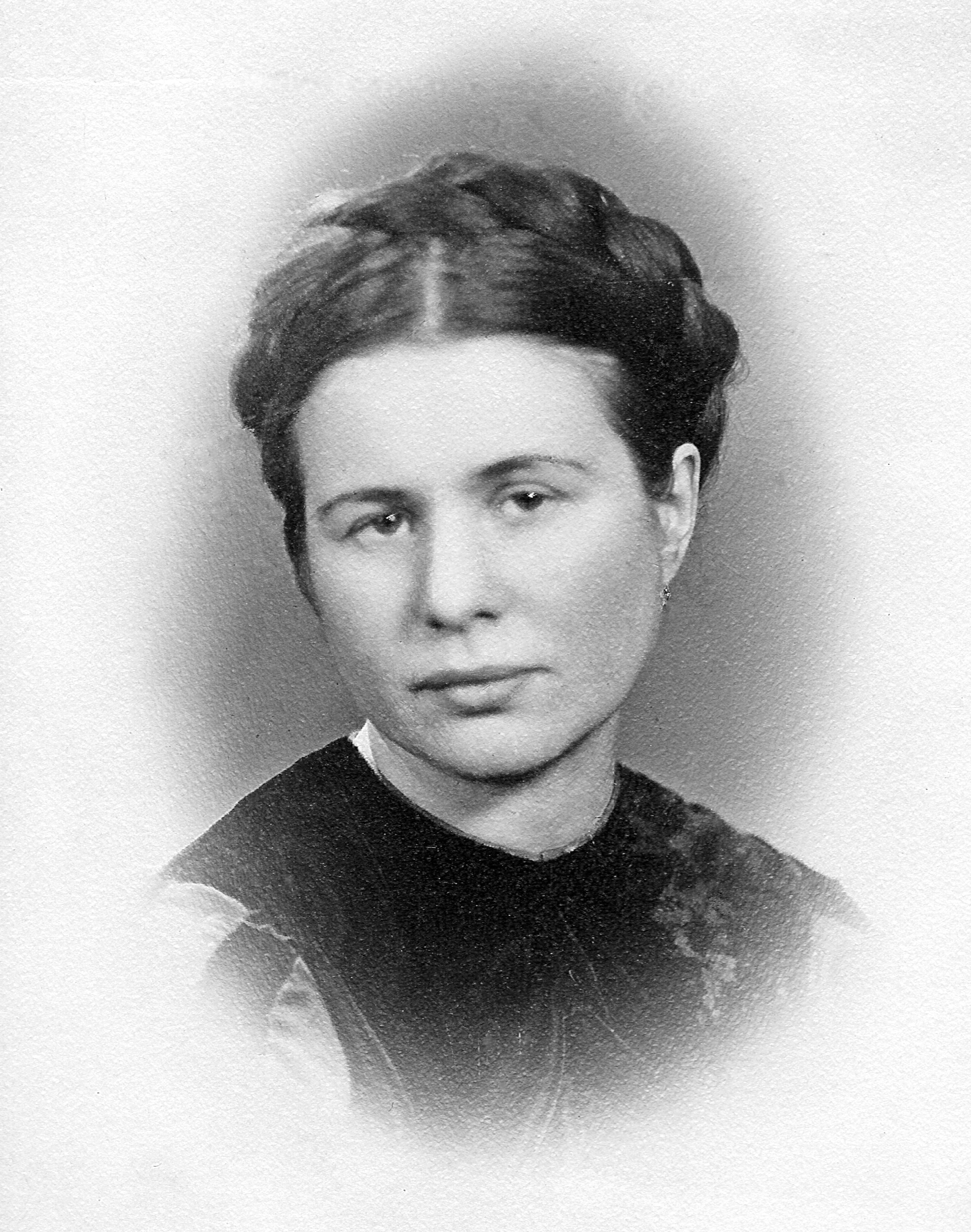
Irena Sendler, member of Żegota, saved 2,500 Jewish children

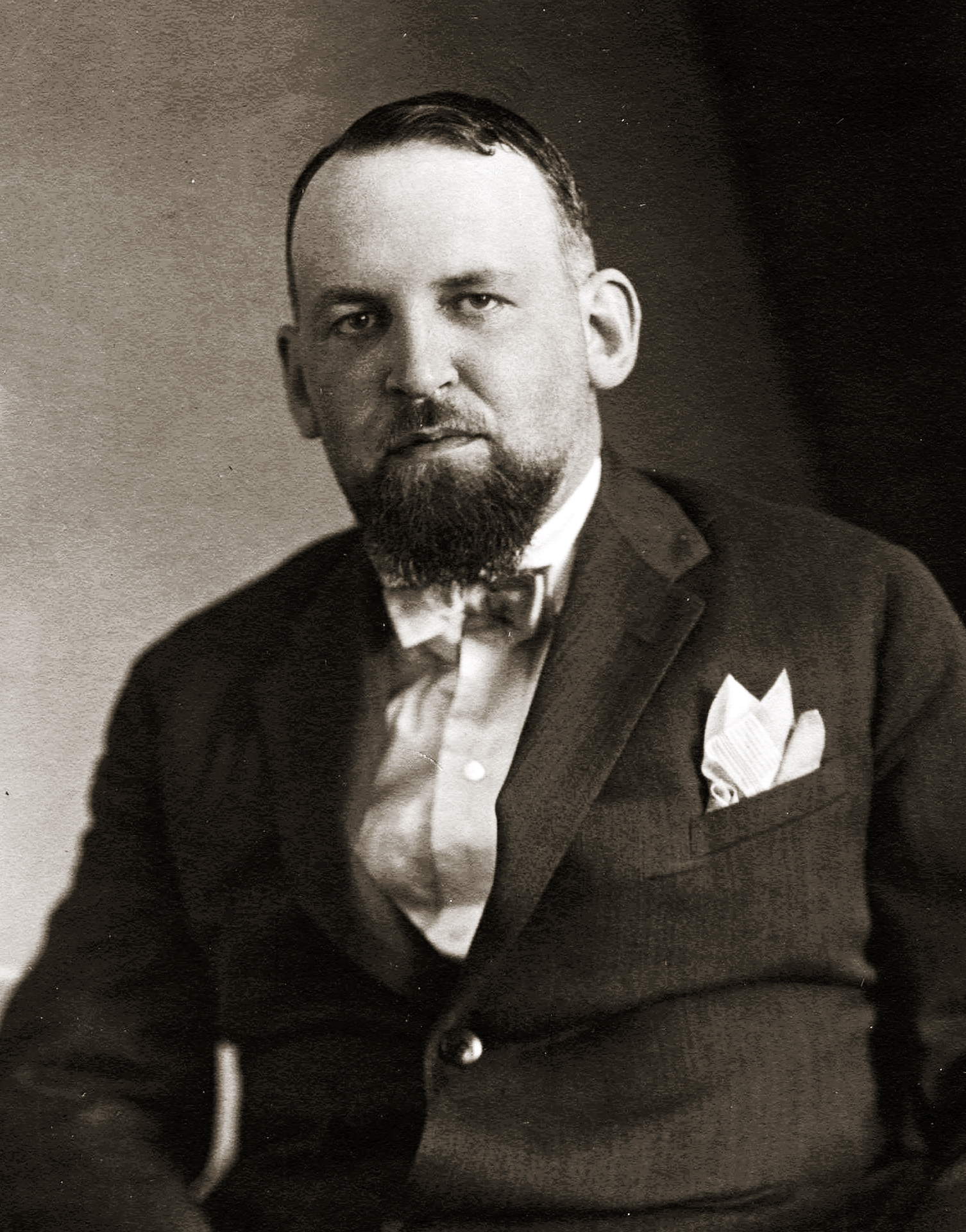
Aleksander Ładoś

Poland had a very large Jewish population, and, according to Norman Davies, more Jews were both killed and rescued in Poland than in any other nation: the rescue figure usually being put at between 100,000–150,000. The memorial at Bełżec extermination camp commemorates 600,000 murdered Jews and 1,500 Poles who tried to save Jews. 6,532 men and women (more than from any other country in the world) have been recognized as rescuers by Yad Vashem in Israel., constituting the largest national contingent. Martin Gilbert wrote that "Poles who risked their own lives to save the Jews were indeed the exception. But they could be found throughout Poland, in every town and village."

Poland during the Holocaust of World War II was under total enemy control: initially, half of Poland was occupied by the Germans, as the General Government and Reichskomissariat; the other half by the Soviets, along with the territories of today's Belarus and Ukraine. The death penalty was threatened for individuals hiding Jews and their families. The list of Polish citizens officially recognized as Righteous includes 700 names of those who lost their lives while trying to help their Jewish neighbors. There were also groups, such as the Polish Żegota organization, that took drastic and dangerous steps to rescue victims. Witold Pilecki, a member of Armia Krajowa, the Polish Home Army, organized a resistance movement in Auschwitz from 1940, and Jan Karski tried to spread the word of the Holocaust.

When AK Home Army Intelligence discovered the true fate of transports leaving the Jewish Ghetto, the council to Aid Jews – Rada Pomocy Żydom (codename Żegota) – was established in late 1942 in co-operation with church groups. The organization saved thousands. Emphasis was placed on protecting children, as it was nearly impossible to intervene directly against the heavily guarded transports. False papers were prepared, and children were distributed among safe houses and church networks. Two women founded the movement: the Catholic writer and activist Zofia Kossak-Szczucka and the socialist Wanda Filipowicz. Some of its members had been involved in Polish nationalist movements, which were themselves anti-Jewish, but which became appalled by the barbarity of the Nazi mass murders. In an emotional protest prior to the foundation of the council, Kossak wrote that Hitler's race murders were a crime about which it was not possible to remain silent. While Polish Catholics might still feel Jews were "enemies of Poland", Kossak wrote that protest was required: "God requires this protest from us... It is required of a Catholic conscience... The blood of the innocent calls for vengeance to the heavens."

In the 1948–49 Zegota Case, the Stalin-backed regime established in Poland after the war secretly tried and imprisoned the leading survivors of Zegota as part of a campaign to eliminate and besmirch resistance heroes who might threaten the new regime.

Jews were aided also by diplomats outside Poland. The Ładoś Group was a group of Polish diplomats and Jewish activists who created in Switzerland a system of illegal production of Latin American passports aimed at saving European Jews from the Holocaust. About 10,000 Jews received such passports, of whom over 3,000 have been saved. The group efforts are documented in the Eiss Archive. Jews were also helped by Henryk Sławik, in Hungary, who helped save over 30,000 Polish refugees, including 5,000 Polish Jews by giving them false Polish passports with a Catholic designation, and by Tadeusz Romer in Japan.

=== Portugal ===
Historians have estimated that up to one million refugees fled from the Nazis through Portugal during World War II, an impressive number considering the size of the country's population at that time (circa 6 million). Portugal remained neutral within the overall objectives of the Anglo-Portuguese Alliance; and that astute policy under precarious conditions, made it possible for Portugal to contribute to the rescue of a large number of refugees. Portuguese Prime Minister António de Oliveira Salazar allowed all international Jewish organizations—HIAS, HICEM, the American Jewish Joint Distribution Committee, World Jewish Congress, and Portuguese Jewish relief committees—to establish themselves in Lisbon. In 1944, in Hungary, risking their lives, the diplomats Carlos Sampaio Garrido and Carlos de Liz-Texeira Branquinho, coordinating with Salazar, also helped many Jews escape Nazis and their Hungarian allies. In June 1940, when Germany invaded France, Portuguese consul in Bordeaux, Aristides de Sousa Mendes issued visas, indiscriminately, to a population in panic, without asking previous authorizations from Lisbon, as he was supposed to. On 20 June, the British Embassy in Lisbon accused the Consul in Bordeaux of improperly charging money for issuing visas and Sousa Mendes was called to Lisbon. The number of visas issued by Sousa Mendes cannot be determined; a 1999 study by the Yad Vashem historian Dr. Avraham Milgram published by the Shoah Resource Center, International School for Holocaust Studies, asserts that there is a great difference between reality and the myth created by the generally cited numbers. Sousa Mendes never lost his title as he kept on being listed in the Portuguese Diplomatic Yearbook until 1954 and kept on receiving his full Consul salary, $1,593 Portuguese Escudos, until the day he died. Other Portuguese credited for saving Jews during the war are Professor Francisco Paula Leite Pinto and Moisés Bensabat Amzalak. A devoted Jew, and a Salazar supporter, Amzalak headed the Lisbon Jewish community for more than fifty years (from 1926 until 1978). Leite Pinto, General Manager of the Portuguese railways, together with Amzalak, organized several trains, coming from Berlin and other cities, loaded with refugees.

=== Serbia ===
After the Invasion of Yugoslavia, the country was occupied by Germany and some regions were occupied by Italy, Hungary, Bulgaria and Albania. A joint German-Italian puppet state called Independent State of Croatia was installed. After a bombing campaign on major Serbian cities, a German puppet regime Nedić's Serbia led by Milan Nedić was installed. In collaboration with the German Army, Serbian Chetnik collaborators along with the Serbian Volunteer Corps as well as the Serbian State Guard assisted in the persecution of Jews in Serbia proper, in Hungarian-occupied Vojvodina region, and in the territory held by the Croatian Ustashas. Serbian Jews who were not transported to concentration camps in Germany were either murdered in Nazi concentration camps within Serbia (Sajmište and Banjica), Banjica being jointly controlled by Nedic's Government and the German Army, or transported to Ustasha-controlled concentration camp Jasenovac and murdered there. Jews living in Hungarian-occupied regions faced mass executions, the most notorious being the Novi Sad raid in 1942.

Serbian civilians were involved in saving thousands of Yugoslavian Jews during this period. Miriam Steiner-Aviezer, a researcher into Yugoslavian Jewry and a member of Yad Vashem's Righteous Gentiles committee states: "The Serbs saved many Jews. Contrary to their present image in the world, the Serbs are a friendly, loyal people who will not abandon their neighbors." As of 2017 Yad Vashem recognizes 135 Serbians as Righteous Among Nations, the highest of any Balkan country.

=== Spain ===
In Franco's Spain, several diplomats contributed very actively to rescue Jews during the Holocaust. The two most prominent ones were Ángel Sanz Briz (the Angel of Budapest), who saved around five thousand Hungarian Jews by providing them Spanish passports, and Eduardo Propper de Callejón, who helped thousands of Jews to escape from France to Spain. Other diplomats with a relevant role were Bernardo Rolland de Miota (consul of Spain at Paris), José Rojas Moreno (ambassador at Bucharest), Miguel Ángel de Muguiro (diplomat at the embassy in Budapest), Sebastián Romero Radigales (consul at Athens), Julio Palencia Tubau, (diplomat at the embassy in Sofía), Juan Schwartz Díaz-Flores (consul at Vienna) and José Ruiz Santaella (diplomat at the embassy in Berlin).

=== Vatican City State ===
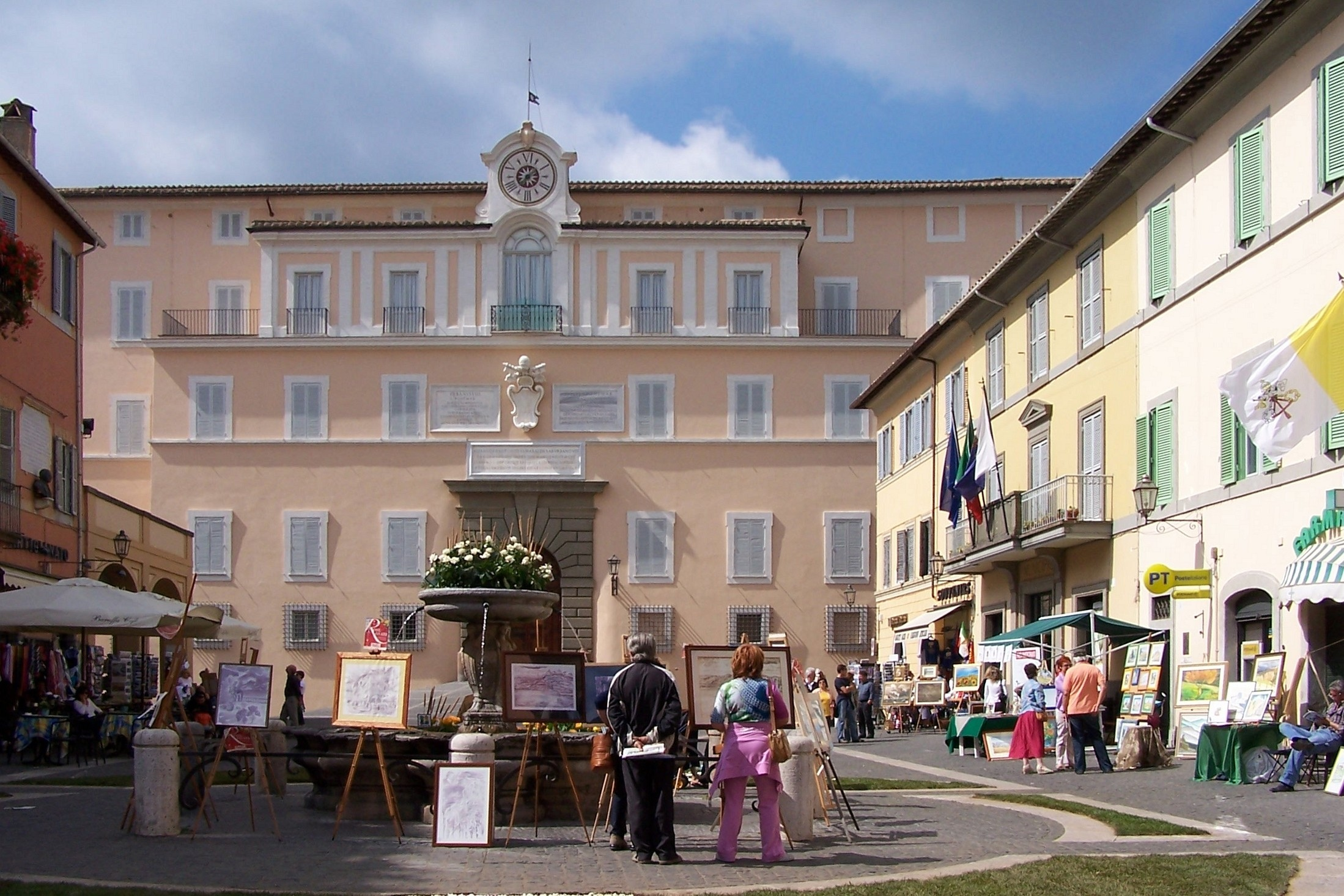
The Papal Palace of Castel Gandolfo, the Pope's summer residence, was thrown open to Jews fleeing the Nazi roundups in Northern Italy. In Rome, Pope Pius XII had ordered the city's Catholic institutions to open themselves to the Jews, and 4715 of the 5715 people listed for deportation by the Nazis were sheltered in 150 institutions – 477 in the Vatican itself.

In the 1930s, Pope Pius XI urged Mussolini to ask Hitler to restrain the anti-Semitic actions taking place in Germany. In 1937, the Pope issued the Mit brennender Sorge (German: "With burning concern") encyclical, in which he asserted the inviolability of human rights. (Note: It was written partly in response to the Nuremberg Laws, and condemned racial theories and the mistreatment of people based on race. Pius XI condemned the 1938 Kristallnacht, sparking mass demonstrations against Catholics and Jews in Munich, where the Bavarian Gauleiter Adolf Wagner declared: "Every utterance the Pope makes in Rome is an incitement of the Jews throughout the world to agitate against Germany". The Vatican took steps to find refuge for Jews. Pius XI rejected the Nazi claim of racial superiority, and insisted instead that there was only a single human race.)

Pius XII

Pope Pius XII succeeded Pius XI on the eve of war in 1939. He used diplomacy to aid the victims of the Holocaust, and directed the Church to provide discreet aid. His encyclicals such as Summi Pontificatus and Mystici corporis preached against racism—with specific reference to Jews: "there is neither Gentile nor Jew, circumcision nor uncircumcision". His 1942 Christmas radio address denounced the murder of "hundreds of thousands" of "faultless" people because of their "nationality or race". The Nazis were furious and The Reich Security Main Office, responsible for the deportation of Jews, called him the "mouthpiece of the Jewish war criminals". Pius XII intervened to attempt to block Nazi deportations of Jews in various countries.

Following the capitulation of Italy, Nazi deportations of Jews to death camps began. Pius XII protested at diplomatic levels, while several thousand Jews found refuge in Catholic networks. On 27 June 1943, Vatican Radio broadcast a papal injunction: "He who makes a distinction between Jews and other men is being unfaithful to God and is in conflict with God's commands".

When the Nazis came to Rome in search of Jews, the Pope had already days earlier ordered the sanctuaries of the Vatican City be opened to all "non-Aryans" in need of refuge and according to Martin Gilbert, by the morning of 16 October, "a total of 477 Jews had been given shelter in the Vatican and its enclaves, while another 4,238 had been given sanctuary in the many monasteries and convents of in Rome. Only 1,015 of Rome's 6,730 Jews were seized that morning". Upon receiving news of the roundups on the morning of 16 October, the Pope immediately instructed Cardinal Secretary of State Maglione, to make a protest to the German ambassador. After the meeting, the ambassador gave orders for a halt to the arrests. Earlier, the Pope had helped the Jews of Rome by offering gold towards the 50 kg ransom demanded by the Nazis.

Other noted rescuers assisted by Pius were Pietro Palazzini Giovanni Ferrofino, Giovanni Palatucci, Pierre-Marie Benoit and others. When Archbishop Giovanni Montini (later Pope Paul VI) was offered an award for his rescue work by Israel, he said he had only been acting on the orders of Pius XII.

Pius' diplomatic representatives lobbied on behalf of Jews across Europe, including in Vichy France, Hungary, Romania, Bulgaria, Croatia and Slovakia, Germany itself and elsewhere. Many papal nuncios played important roles in the rescue of Jews, among them Giuseppe Burzio, the Vatican Chargé d'Affaires in Slovakia; Filippo Bernardini, Nuncio to Switzerland; and Angelo Roncalli, the Nuncio to Turkey. Angelo Rotta, the wartime Nuncio to Budapest and Andrea Cassulo, the Nuncio to Bucharest have been recognized as Righteous Among the Nations.

Pius directly protested the deportations of Slovak Jews to the Bratislava government from 1942. He made a direct intervention in Hungary to lobby for an end to Jewish deportations in 1944, and on 4 July, the Hungarian leader, Admiral Horthy, told Berlin that deportations of Jews must cease, citing protests by the Vatican, the King of Sweden and the Red Cross. The pro-Nazi, anti-Semitic Arrow Cross Party seized power in October, and a campaign of murder of the Jews commenced. The neutral powers led a major rescue effort and Pius' representative, Angelo Rotta, took the lead in establishing an "international Ghetto", marked by the emblems of the Swiss, Swedish, Portuguese, Spanish and Vatican legations, and providing shelter for some 25,000 Jews.

In Rome, some 4,000 Italian Jews and escaped prisoners of war avoided deportation, many of them hidden in safe houses or evacuated from Italy by a resistance group organized by the Irish-born priest and Vatican official Hugh O'Flaherty. Msgr. O'Flaherty used his political connections to help secure sanctuary for dispossessed Jews. The wife of the Irish ambassador, Delia Murphy, assisted him.

== Leaders and diplomats ==
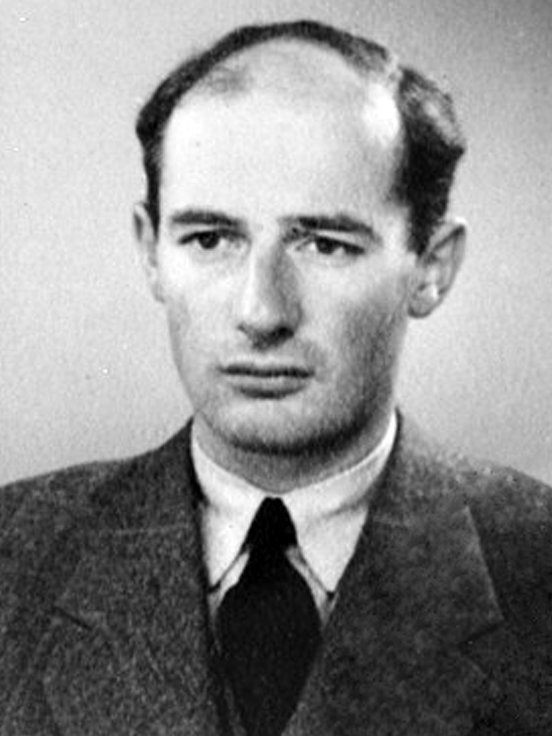
Raoul Wallenberg

- Raoul Wallenberg as Swedish diplomat went to Budapest on July 7, 1944 at the request of the American War Refugee Board. Together with his colleagues saved possibly tens of thousands of Hungarian Jews by providing them with Swedish protection papers.

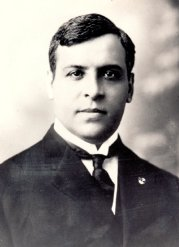
Aristides de Sousa Mendes, between 16 and 23 June 1940, frantically issued Portuguese visas, free of charge, to over 30,000 refugees seeking to escape the Nazi terror.

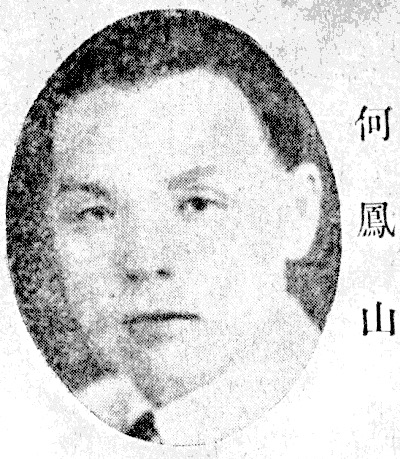
Chinese consul in Vienna, Ho Feng-Shan, freely issued thousands of visas to Jews.

- Per Anger – Swedish diplomat in Budapest who originated the idea of issuing provisional passports to Hungarian Jews to protect them from arrest and deportation to camps. Anger collaborated with Raoul Wallenberg to save the lives of thousands of Jews.
- Władysław Bartoszewski – Polish Żegota activist.
- Count Folke Bernadotte of Wisborg – Swedish diplomat, who negotiated the release of 27,000 people (a significant number of whom were Jews) to hospitals in Sweden.
- Jacob (Jack) Benardout – British diplomat to Dominican Republic before and during World War II. Issued numerous Dominican Republic visas to Jews in Germany. Only 16 Jewish families arrived in the Dominican Republic (the other Jews dispersed to countries along the way, e.g. Britain, America) and so created the Jewish community of the Dominican Republic.
- Hiram Bingham IV – American Vice Consul in Marseille, France, 1940–1941.
- José Castellanos Contreras – a Salvadorean army colonel and diplomat who, while working as El Salvador's Consul General in Geneva from 1942 to 1945, and in conjunction with George Mantello, helped save at least 13,000 Central European Jews from Nazi persecution by providing them with false papers of Salvadorean nationality.
- Georg Ferdinand Duckwitz – German diplomatic attaché in Denmark. Alerted Danish politician Hans Hedtoft about the imminent German plans deport to Denmark's Jewish community, thus enabling the following rescue of the Danish Jews.
- Harald Edelstam – Swedish diplomat in Norway who helped to protect and smuggle hundreds of Jews and Norwegian resistance fighters to Sweden.
- Gisi Fleischmann led the Bratislava Working Group, one of the most important rescue groups, in partnership with Rabbi Chaim Michael Dov Weissmandl. They successfully negotiated with the Nazis in early 1942 to stop the transports from Slovakia and a few months later, via the Europa Plan, to try to stop transports from other parts of Europe. They demanded bombing of the rail lines to Auschwitz and authored/distributed the Auschwitz Report in 1944.
- Rabbi Chaim Michael Dov Weissmandl of the Bratislava Working Group. See Gisi Fleischmann above.
- Wilfrid Israel had important role in the Kindertransport. See his webpage for details.
- Frank Foley – British MI6 agent undercover as a passport officer in Berlin, saved around 10,000 people by issuing forged passports to Britain and the British Mandate of Palestine.
- Varian Fry - American journalist who saved 2,000 - 4,000 Jews, including many prominent artists and intellectuals.
- Rafael Leónidas Trujillo – the Dominican dictator promised to receive 100,000 Jewish refugees into the Dominican Republic in 1938 when Franklin D. Roosevelt organized an international conference in Evian to discuss the persecution of the Jews. Dominican Republic was the only nation accepting Jews immigrants after the conference. The DORSA (Dominican Republic Settlement Association) was formed to settle Jews on the northern coast. 5,000 visas were issued, but only 645 European Jews reached the settlement. The refugees were assigned land and cattle and the town of Sosúa was founded. 5000 dollars in gold from Jewish International in New York were paid for each person taken by the Trujillo. Other refugees settled in the capital Santo Domingo.
- Albert Göring – German businessman (and younger brother of leading Nazi Hermann Göring) who helped Jews and dissidents survive in Germany.
- Paul Grüninger – Swiss commander of police who provided falsely dated papers to over 3,000 refugees so they could escape Austria following the Anschluss.

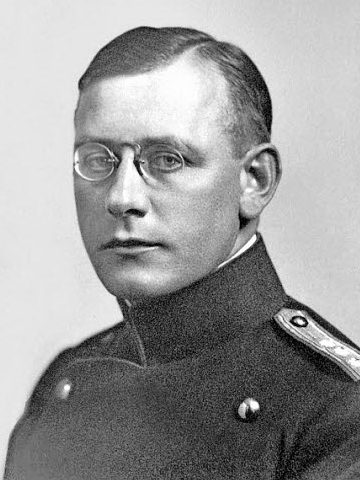
Paul Grüninger, commander of the police of the Canton of St. Gallen in Switzerland, who provided falsely dated papers from late 1938 to autumn 1939 to over 3,000 refugees so they could escape Austria.

- Carlos María Gurméndez - Uruguayan ambassador to the Netherlands who sheltered German and Dutch Jews in the Uruguayan embassy and assisted with their travel to Uruguay and the United States.
- Kiichiro Higuchi – Japanese lieutenant general who saved 20,000 Jewish refugees.
- Wilm Hosenfeld – German officer who helped pianist Wladyslaw Szpilman, a Polish Jew, among many others.
- Seishirō Itagaki – Japanese Army Minister who proposed and adopted a Japanese national policy to receive Jewish refugees.
- Lyndon B. Johnson – Future President of the United States who, as a member of the United States House of Representatives in 1938, helped Austrian conductor Erich Leinsdorf gain permanent residency in the United States. Johnson later helped Jews enter the U.S. through Latin America and become workers on National Youth Administration projects in Texas.
- Prince Constantin Karadja – Romanian diplomat, who saved over 51,000 Jews from deportation and extermination, as credited by Yad Vashem in 2005.
- Jan Karski – Polish emissary of Armia Krajowa to Western Allies and eye-witness of the Holocaust.
- Necdet Kent – Turkish Consul General at Marseille, who granted Turkish citizenship to hundreds of Jews. At one point, he entered an Auschwitz-bound train at enormous personal risk to save from deportation 70 Jews, to whom he had granted Turkish citizenship.
- Fumimaro Konoe – Japanese Prime Minister who adopted a Japanese national policy to receive Jewish refugees.
- Zofia Kossak-Szczucka – Polish founder of Zegota.
- Hillel Kook (aka Peter Bergson) established a US-based rescue group: the Emergency Committee for the Rescue of European Jewry, which had considerable support in Congress. The group's activism was the major factor forcing President Franklin D. Roosevelt to establish the War Refugee Board in January 1944. Significant added credit is due to the US Treasury Secretary Henry Morgenthau and his team. One of the WRB's important actions was initiation and sponsoring of the Raoul Wallenberg mission to Budapest.
- Carl Lutz – Swiss consul in Budapest, protected tens of thousands of Jews in Hungary, including thousands in the Budapest Glass House.
- Luis Martins de Souza Dantas – Brazilian in charge of the Brazilian diplomatic mission in France. He granted Brazilian visas to several Jews and other minorities persecuted by the Nazis. He was proclaimed as Righteous among the Nations in 2003.
- George Mantello (b. Mandl Gyorgy) – El Salvador's honorary consul for Hungary, Romania, and Czechoslovakia - a Jew from the Hungarian part of Romania - – provided Salvadoran protection papers for thousands of Jews. After receipt an abbreviated version of the Auschwitz Report on June 20, 1944 he spearheaded an unprecedented Swiss grassroots protests, including masses in Swiss churches and a press campaign of over 400 articles in a very short time. It led to Roosevelt, Churchill and other world leaders threatening Hungary's ruler, regent Miklos Horthy, with post-war retribution if the transports did not stop. That ended the deportation of Jews from Hungary to Auschwitz.
- Boris III of Bulgaria – King of Bulgaria from 1918 to 1943 Resisted demands from Hitler to deport the Jews resulting in all 50,000 being spared, Boris died in 1943 after meeting with Hitler.
- Paul V. McNutt – United States High Commissioner of the Philippines, 1937–1939, who facilitated the entry of Jewish refugees into the Philippines.
- Helmuth James Graf von Moltke – adviser to Nazi Germany on international law; active in Kreisau Circle resistance group, sent Jews to safe-haven countries.
- Delia Murphy – wife of Dr. Thomas J. Kiernan, Irish minister in Rome 1941–1946, who worked with Hugh O'Flaherty and was part of the network that saved the lives of POWs and Jews in the hands of the Gestapo.
- Jean-Marie Musy, past President of Switzerland, drove to Berlin with his son Benoit from Switzerland toward end of the war while the German highways were bombed to negotiate with Himmler on behalf of Recha Sternbuch in order to rescue large numbers of Jews in the concentration camps as Germany was withdrawing toward end of the war.
- Giovanni Palatucci – Italian police official who saved several thousand.
- Giorgio Perlasca – Italian. When Ángel Sanz Briz was ordered to leave Hungary, Perlasca in Budapest "stepped into his shoes": falsely claimed to be his substitute and saved some thousands more Jews.
- Dimitar Peshev – Deputy Speaker of the Bulgarian Parliament, played a major role in rescuing Bulgaria's 48 000 Jews, the entire Jewish population in Bulgaria at the time.
- Frits Philips – Dutch industrialist who saved 382 Jews by insisting to the Nazis that they were indispensable employees of Philips.
- Witold Pilecki – the only person who volunteered to be imprisoned in Auschwitz, organized a resistance inside the camp and as a member of Armia Krajowa sent the first reports on the camp atrocities to the Polish Government in Exile, from where they were passed to the rest of the Western Allies.
- Karl Plagge – a major in the Wehrmacht Heer who issued work permits in order to save almost 1,000 Jews (see The Search for Major Plagge: The Nazi Who Saved Jews, by Michael Good)
- Enver Hoxha – Led the Resistance against the German and Italians in Albania. Hoxha refused that the Germans or collaborationists deport a single Jew, therefore Albania was the only country in Europe to have an increased Jewish population after the war.
- Mehmet Shehu – a resistance fighter in Albania who allowed Jews to enter Albania, and refused to hand the Jews over to The Germans, during the occupation
- Eduardo Propper de Callejón – First Secretary in the Spanish embassy in Paris who stamped and signed passports almost non-stop for four days in 1940 to let Jewish refugees escape to Spain and Portugal.
- Traian Popovici – Romanian mayor of Cernăuți (Chernivtsi) who saved 20,000 Jews of Bukovina.
- Manuel L. Quezon – President of the Commonwealth of the Philippines, 1935–1941, assisted in resettling Jewish refugees on the island of Mindanao.
- Florencio Rivas – Consul General of Uruguay in Germany, who allegedly hid one hundred and fifty Jews during Kristallnacht and later provided them with passports.
- Gilberto Bosques Saldívar – General Consul of Mexico in Marseille, France. For two years, he issued Mexican visas to around 40,000 Jews, Spaniards and political refugees, allowing them to escape to Mexico and other countries. He was imprisoned by the Nazis in 1943 and released to Mexico in 1944.
- Ángel Sanz Briz – Spanish consul in Hungary. Together with Giorgio Perlasca, he saved more than 5,000 Jews in Budapest by issuing Spanish passports to them.
- Abdol-Hossein Sardari – Head of Consular affairs at the Iranian Embassy in Paris. He saved many Iranian Jews and gave 500 blank Iranian passports to an acquaintance of his, to be used by non-Iranian Jews in France.

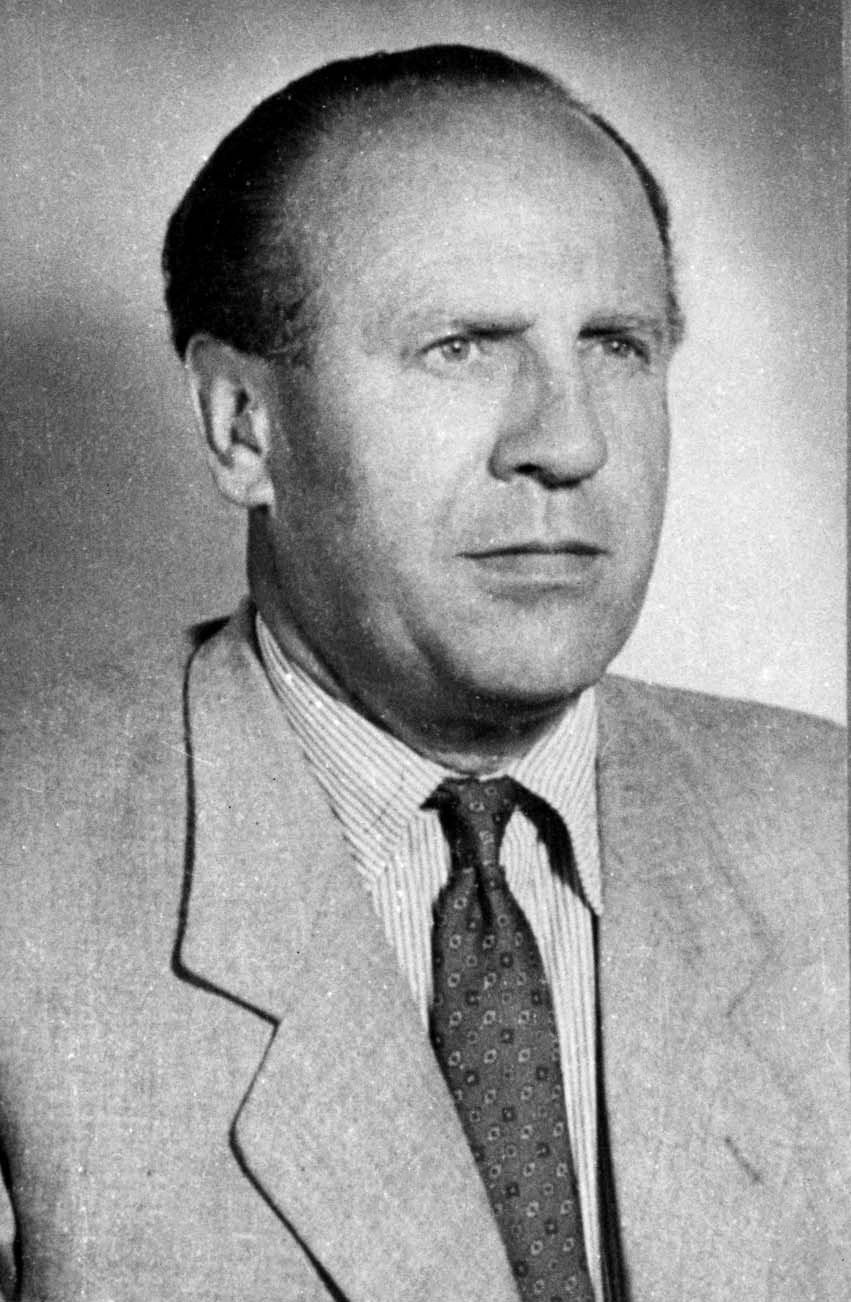
Oskar Schindler saved 1,200 Jews by employing them in his factories.

- Oskar Schindler – German businessman whose efforts to save his 1,200 Jewish workers were recounted in the book Schindler's Ark and the film Schindler's List.
- Rabbi Solomon Schonfeld rescued many thousands of Jews, partly from the Kindertransport. He requested that the Auschwitz crematoria be bombed, purchased Stranger's Cey, an island in the British Bahamas, hoping it could be a shelter for Jewish refugees from the Holocaust, convinced large numbers in Parliament to pass a motion allowing Jews who could escape from Nazi held territories to find refuge in parts of the British Empire. The Parliamentary motion had omitted Palestine as a haven, and was therefore opposed by a lobby group which should have helped instead, as was the case with the Mauritius initiatives.
- Eduard Schulte – German industrialist, the first to inform the Allies about the mass extermination of Jews.
- Irena Sendler – Polish head of Zegota children's department who saved 2,500 Jewish children most of whom she smuggled out from the Warsaw Ghetto.
- Ho Feng Shan – Chinese Consul in Vienna who freely issued visas to Jews.
- Henryk Slawik – Polish diplomat who saved 5,000–10,000 people in Budapest, Hungary.
- Aristides de Sousa Mendes – Portuguese diplomat in Bordeaux, who signed about 30,000 visas to help Jews and persecuted minorities to escape the Nazis and The Holocaust.
- Recha Sternbuch sometimes together with her husband Yitzchak, an Orthodox Jewish couple, rescued large numbers of Jews by smuggling them into Switzerland from Austria, by distributing protection papers, by negotiating with Himmler with help of Jean-Marie Musy to save Jews in the concentration camps as the Germans were retreating, and by rescuing the Jews who arrived to Bergen-Belsen by train from Hungary.

- Chiune Sempo Sugihara – Japanese consul to Kovno, Lithuania, 2,140 (mostly Polish) Jews and an unknown number of additional family members were saved by Japanese travel documents, unauthorized by Japan, provided by him in 1940 and travel documents previously provided by Dutch ambassador in Riga L.P.J. deDecker and Dutch honorary consul Jan Zwartendijk in Kovno.
- Hideki Tōjō – General and Prime Minister of Japan who received Jewish refugees in Manchuria and rejected German protest.
- Selâhattin Ülkümen – Turkish diplomat who saved the lives of some 42 Jewish Turkish families, more than 200 persons, among a Jewish community of some 2000 after the Germans occupied the island of Rhodes in 1944.
- Raoul Wallenberg – Swedish diplomat. Wallenberg saved the lives of tens of thousands of Jews condemned to certain death by the Nazis during World War II. In January 1945, Wallenberg was imprisoned at the headquarters of Rodion Malinovsky in Debrecen and disappeared. He is believed to have been poisoned in the Lubyanka Building by the NKVD torturer Grigory Mairanovsky.
- Sir Nicholas Winton – British stockbroker who organized the Czech Kindertransport which sent 669 children (most of them Jewish) to foster parents ln England and Sweden from Czechoslovakia and Austria after Kristallnacht. Sir Nicholas was nominated for the 2008 Nobel Peace Prize.
- Namik Kemal Yolga – A Vice-Consul at the Turkish Embassy in Paris who saved numerous Turkish Jews from deportation.
- Guelfo Zamboni – Consul General at Thessaloniki who gave false papers to save the lives of over 300 Jews residing there.

== Religious figures ==
=== Catholic officials ===
- Pope Pius XII, preached against racism in encyclicals like Summi Pontificatus. Used Vatican Radio to denounce race murders and anti-Semitism. Directly lobbied Axis officials to stop Jewish deportations. Opened the sanctuaries of the Vatican to Rome's Jews during the Nazi roundup.
- Monsignor Hugh O'Flaherty CBE – Irish Catholic priest who saved more than 6,500 Allied soldiers and Jews; known as the "Scarlet Pimpernel of the Vatican". Retold in the film The Scarlet and the Black.
- Filippo Bernardini, papal nuncio to Switzerland.
- Giuseppe Burzio, the Vatican Chargé d'Affaires in Slovakia. Protested the anti-Semitism and totalitarianism of the Tiso regime. Burzio advised Rome of the deteriorating situation for Jews in the Nazi puppet state, sparking Vatican protests on behalf of Jews.
- Angelo Roncalli, the nuncio to Turkey saved a number of Croatian, Bulgarian and Hungarian Jews by assisting their migration to Palestine. Roncalli succeeded Pius XII as Pope John XXIII, and always said that he had been acting on the orders of Pius XII in his actions to rescue Jews.
- Andrea Cassulo, papal nuncio in Romania. Appealed directly to Marshall Antonescu to limit the deportations of Jews to Nazi concentration camps planned for the summer of 1942.
- Cardinal Gerlier of France refused to hand over Jewish children being sheltered in Catholic homes. In September 1942, Eight Jesuits were arrested for sheltering hundreds of children on Jesuit properties, and Pius XII's Secretary of State, Cardinal Maglione protested to the Vichy Ambassador.
- Giuseppe Marcone, apostolic visitor to Croatia, lobbied Croat regime, saved 1000 Jewish partners in mixed marriages.
- Archbishop Aloysius Stepinac of Zagreb, condemned Croat atrocities against both Serbs and Jews, and himself saved a group of Jews. He declared publicly in the spring of 1942 that it was "forbidden to exterminate Gypsies and Jews because they are said to belong to an inferior race".
- Bishop Pavel Gojdič protested the persecution of Slovak Jews. Gojdic was beatified by the Church and recognized as Righteous Among the Nations by Yad Vashem.
- Angelo Rotta, papal nuncio to Hungary. Actively protested Hungary's mistreatment of the Jews, and helped persuade Pope Pius XII to lobby the Hungarian leader Admiral Horthy to stop their deportation. He issued protective passports for Jews and 15,000 safe conduct passes – the nunciature sheltered some 3000 Jews in safe houses. An "International Ghetto" was established, including more than 40 safe houses marked by the Vatican and other national emblems. 25,000 Jews found refuge in these safe houses. Elsewhere in the city, Catholic institutions hid several thousand more Jewish people.
- Archbishop Johannes de Jong, later Cardinal, of Utrecht, Netherlands, who drew up together with Titus Brandsma O.Carm. († Dachau, 1942) a letter in which he called for all Catholics to assist persecuted Jews, and in which he openly condemned the Nazi German "deportation of our Jewish fellow citizens" (From: Herderlijk Schrijven, read from all pulpits on Sunday 26 January 1942).
- Archbishop Jules-Géraud Saliège of Toulouse – lead a number of French bishops (including Monseigneur Théas, Bishop of Montauban, Monseigneur Delay, Bishop of Marseille, Cardinal Gerlier, Archbishop of Lyon, Monseigneur Vansteenberghe of Bayonne and Monseigneur Moussaron, Archbishop of Albi – in denouncing roundups and mistreatment of Jews in France, spurring greater resistance.
- Père Marie-Benoît, Capuchin priest who saved many Jews in Marseille and later in Rome where he became known among the Jewish community as "father of the Jews".
- Mother Matylda Getter's Franciscan Sisters of the Family of Mary sheltered Jewish children escaping the Warsaw Ghetto. Getter's convent rescued more than 750.
- Alfred Delp S.J., a Jesuit priest who helped Jews escape to Switzerland while rector of St. Georg Church in suburban Munich; also involved with the Kreisau Circle. Executed 2 February 1945 in Berlin.
- Rufino Niccacci, a Franciscan friar and priest who sheltered Jewish refugees in Assisi, Italy, from September 1943 through June 1944.
- Maximilian Kolbe – Polish Conventual Franciscan friar. During the Second World War, in the friary, Kolbe provided shelter to people from Greater Poland, including 2,000 Jews. He was also active as a radio amateur, vilifying Nazi activities through his reports.
- Bernhard Lichtenberg – German Catholic priest at Berlin's Cathedral. Sent to Dachau because he prayed for Jews at Evening Prayer.
- Sára Salkaházi – a Hungarian Roman Catholic nun who sheltered approximately 100 Jews in Budapest.
- Margit Slachta, of the Hungarian Social Service Sisterhood, went to Rome to encourage papal action against the Jewish persecutions. In Hungary, she had sheltered the persecuted and protested forced labour and antisemitism. In 1944, Pius appealed directly to the Hungarian government to halt the deportation of the Jews of Hungary. The Sisters of Social Service, nuns who saved thousands of Hungarian Jews; included Sister Sara Salkahazi, recognized by Yad Vashem as well as beatified.

=== Others ===
- Archbishop Damaskinos – Archbishop of Athens during the German occupation. He formally protested the deportation of Jews and quietly ordered churches under his jurisdiction to issue fake Christian baptismal certificates to Jews fleeing the Nazis. Thousands of Greek Jews in and around Athens were thus able to claim that they were Christian and were thus saved.
- Archbishop Stefan of Sofia – Bishop of Sofia and Exarch of Bulgaria, actively supported Dimitar Peshev's pressure against the Bulgarian government to cancel the deportation of the 48,000 Bulgarian Jews.
- Bishop George Bell - Bishop of Chichester, England and friend of Dietrich Bonhoeffer. In 1936 Bell received the chair of the International Christian Committee for German Refugees, and in that role he especially supported Jewish Christians, who at that time were supported by neither Jewish nor Christian organizations. He provided a temporary home for exiled Jewish children in his own official residence.
- Dietrich Bonhoeffer – a German Lutheran pastor who joined the Abwehr (a German military intelligence organization) which was also the center of the anti-Hitler resistance, and was involved in operations to help German Jews escape to Switzerland. Arrested by the Nazis, he was hanged on 5 April 1945, not long before the war ended.
- Metropolitan Bishop Chrysostomos of Zakynthos, who, when ordered by the Axis occupying forces to submit a list of all Jews on the island, submitted a document bearing just two names: his own and the mayor's. Consequently, all 275 Zante Jews were saved.
- Omelyan Kovch – Ukrainian Greek Catholic priest who was deported to Majdanek for helping thousands of Jews. He was canonized by Pope John Paul II
- Dimitar Peshev was the Deputy Speaker of the National Assembly of Bulgaria and Minister of Justice (1935–1936), before World War II. He rebelled against the pro-Nazi cabinet and prevented the deportation of Bulgaria's 48,000 Jews, and was bestowed the title of "Righteous Among the Nations".
- Leopold Socha was a Polish sewage inspector in the city of Lwów (now Lviv, Ukraine). During the Holocaust, Socha used his knowledge of the city's sewage system to shelter a group of Jews from Nazi Germans and their supporters of different nationalities. In 1978, he was recognized by the State of Israel as Righteous Among the Nations.
- Andrey Sheptytsky – Metropolitan Archbishop of the Ukrainian Greek Catholic Church, harbored hundreds of Jews in his residence and in Greek Catholic monasteries. He also issued the pastoral letter, "Thou Shalt Not Kill", to protest Nazi atrocities.
- André and Magda Trocmé – A French Reformed pastor and his wife who led the Le Chambon-sur-Lignon village movement that saved 3,000–5,000 Jews.
- Maria Skobtsova – Russian Orthodox nun who ran a shelter for alcoholics, drug addicts and homeless people; the shelter was also open for refugees who had fled from the Soviet Union. During the first three years of the war she also took in several hundred Jewish people fearing persecution. She died in Ravensbrück concentration camp during the end of the war, after almost two years in the camp. Canonized by the Eastern Orthodox Church as a saint; she is also named a Righteous among the Nations by Yad Vashem

Quakers

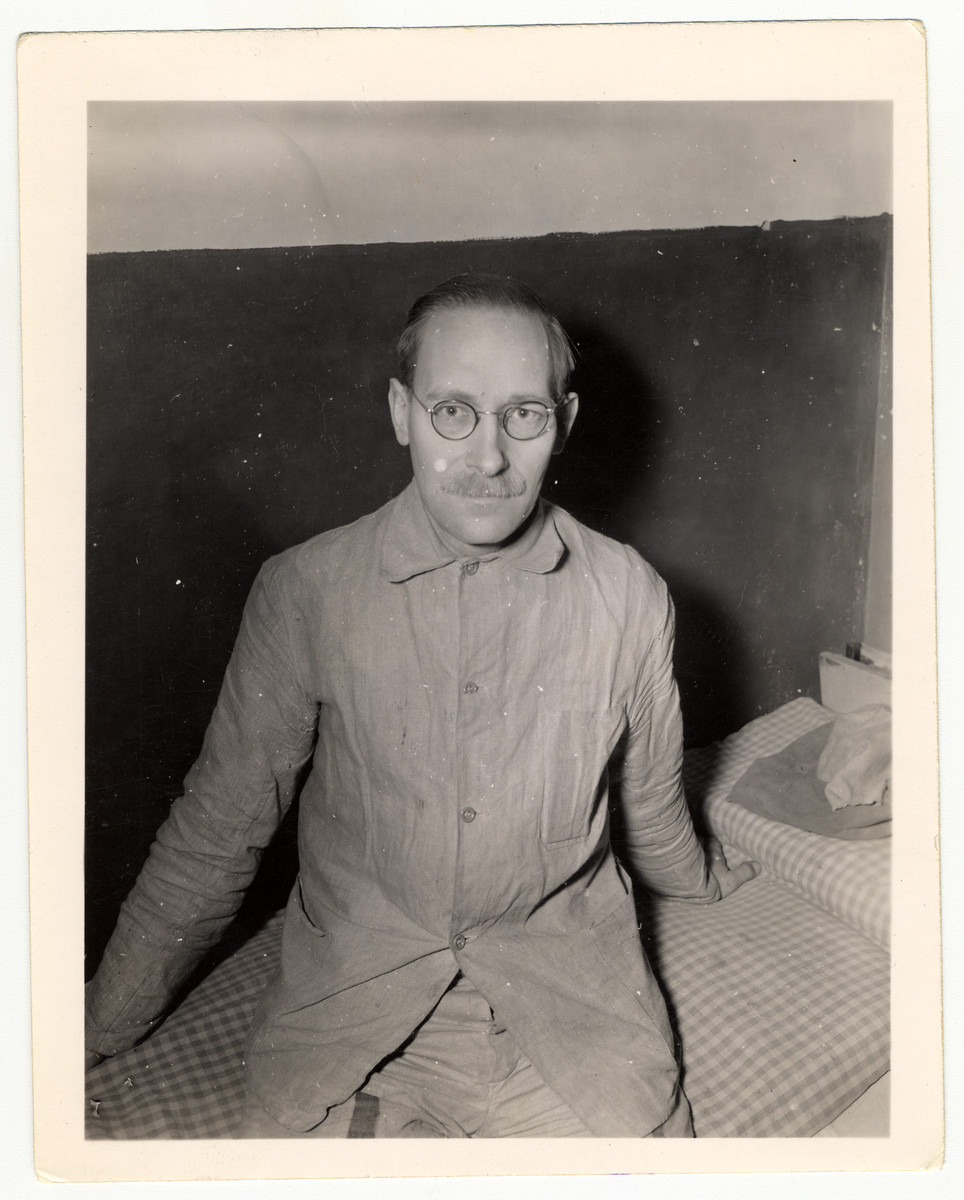
Carl Hermann in Halle jail in Nazi Germany

The Religious Society of Friends, known as Quakers, from 1933 played a major role in assisting and saving Jews through their international network of centres (Berlin, Paris, Vienna) and organizations. In 1947, the Nobel Peace Prize was awarded to the Friends Service Council and to the American Friends Service Committee (AFSC). Also individual Quakers did rescue work.

- Bertha Bracey – As secretary of the Germany Emergency Commission, set up 7 April 1933, in Britain, she raised awareness for the dangers of the Nazi philosophy. With voluntary workers, she handled appeals for assistance from Germany, Austria and Czechoslovakia and contributed substantially to the Kindertransport which brought 10,000 children to England.
- Elisabeth Abegg – On 23 May 1967, Yad Vashem recognized German Quaker Elisabeth Abegg as Righteous Among the Nations. She helped many Jewish people by offering them accommodation in her home or directing them to hiding places elsewhere.
- Kees Boeke and Betty Boeke-Cadbury – On 4 July 1991, Yad Vashem recognized Cornelis Boeke and his wife Beatrice Boeke-Cadbury as Righteous Among the Nations for hiding Jewish children in Bilthoven.
- Laura van den Hoek Ostende – On 29 September 1994, Yad Vashem recognized Dutch Quaker Laura van den Hoek Ostende-van Honk as Righteous Among the Nations for hiding Jews in Putten, Hilversum and Amsterdam.
- Mary Elmes – On 23 January 2013, Yad Vashem recognized Irish Quaker Mary Elisabeth Elmes as Righteous Among the Nations for rescuing Jewish children in France.
- Auguste Fuchs-Bucholz and Fritz Fuchs – On 11 August 2009, Yad Vashem recognized German Quakers Auguste Fuchs-Bucholz and Fritz Fuchs as Righteous Among the Nations.
- Carl Hermann and Eva Hermann – On 19 January 1976, Yad Vashem recognized German Quakers Carl Hermann and Eva Hermann-Lueddecke as Righteous Among the Nations.
- Helga Holbek – In 1982, Yad Vashem recognized Danish AFSC worker Helga Holbek as Righteous Among the Nations for rescuing Jewish children in France.
- Gilbert Lesage – On 14 January 1985, Yad Vashem recognized French Quaker Gilbert Lesage as Righteous Among the Nations.
- Gertrud Luckner – On 15 February 1966, Yad Vashem recognized German Quaker Gertrud Luckner as Righteous Among the Nations.
- Ernst Lusebrink and Elfriede Lusebrink-Bokenkruger – On 11 August 2009, Yad Vashem recognized German Quakers Ernst Lusebrink and Elfriede Lusebrink-Bokenkruger as Righteous Among the Nations.
- Geertruida Pel and Trijntje Pfann – On 15 August 2012, Yad Vashem recognized Dutch Quaker Geertruida Pel and her daughter Trijntje Pfann as Righteous Among the Nations.
- Lili Pollatz-Engelsmann and Manfred Pollatz – On 3 December 2013, Yad Vashem recognized German Quakers Lili Louise Pollatz-Engelsmann and Erwin Herbert Manfred Pollatz as Righteous Among the Nations for hiding German and Dutch Jewish children in their home in Haarlem, Netherlands. Wijnberg, I., Hollaender, A., 'Er wacht nog een kind..., De quakers Lili en Manfred Pollatz, hun school en kindertehuis in Haarlem 1934–1945, AMB Diemen, 2014, ISBN 97890-79700-67-7;
- Wijnberg, I., Hollaender, A., 'Er wacht nog een kind ..., De quakers Lili en Manfred Pollatz, huIlse Schwersensky-Zimmermann and n school en kinderte men, 2014, ISBN 97890-79700-67-7
- Ilse Schwersensky-Zimmermann and Gerhard Schwersensky – On 2 May 1985, Yad Vashem recognized German Quakers Gerhard Schwersensky and Ilse Schwersensky-Zimmermann as Righteous Among the Nations for hiding Jews in Berlin.

== Villages helping Jews ==
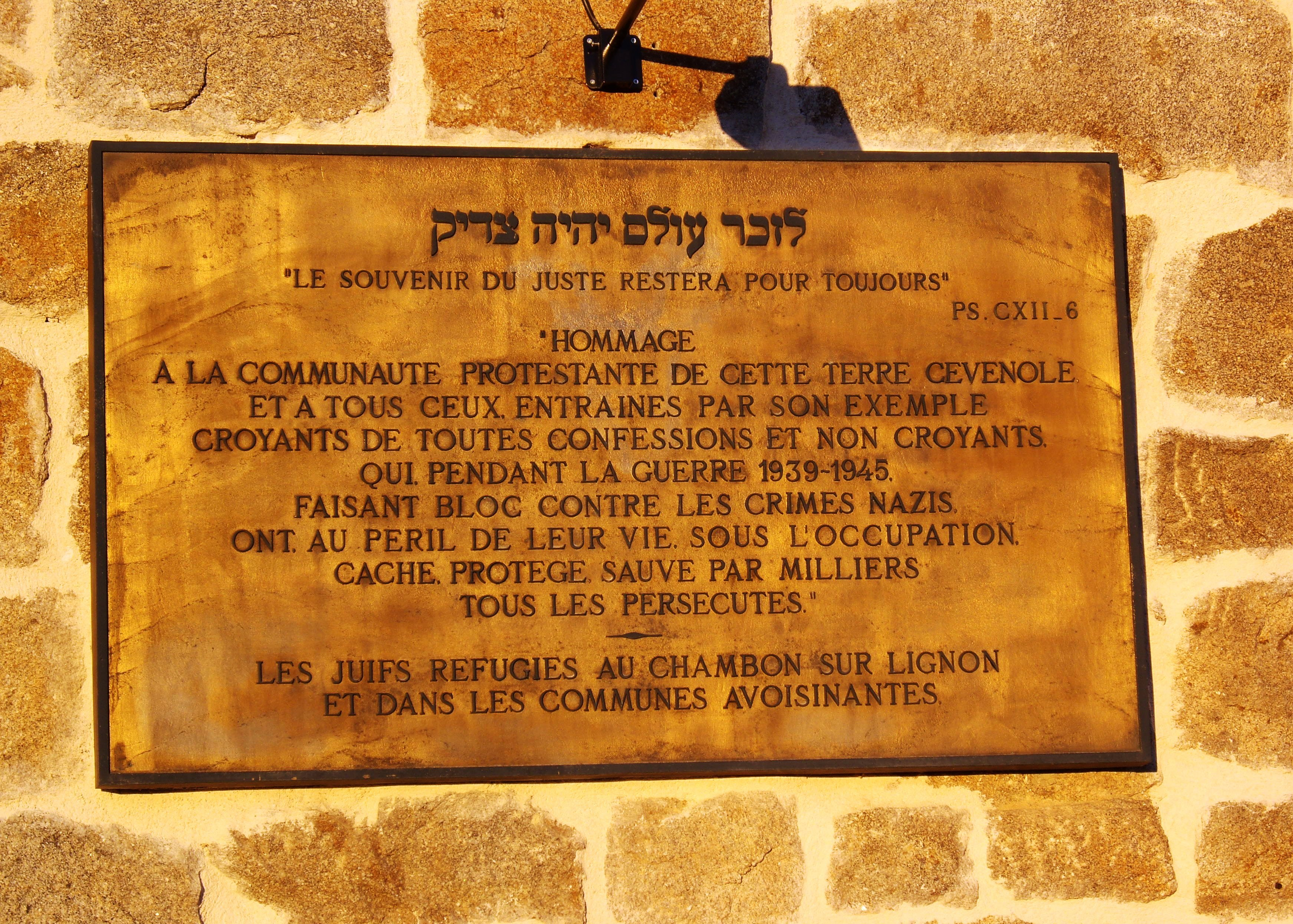
Plaque commemorating the rescue of Jews in Le Chambon-sur-Lignon

- Yaruga, Ukraine
- Le Chambon-sur-Lignon, in the Haute-Loire département in France, which saved up to 5,000 Jews.
- In occupied Poland, among the hundreds of villages involved, some of the most notable included Głuchów near Łańcut with everyone engaged, as well as the villages of Główne, Ozorków, Borkowo near Sierpc, Dąbrowica near Ulanów, in Głupianka near Otwock, and Teresin near Chełm. In Cisie near Warsaw, 25 Poles were caught hiding Jews; all were killed and the village was burned to the ground as punishment. In Gołąbki, Jerzy and Irena Krępeć provided a hiding place for as many as 30 Jews on their farm and set up homeschooling for all children, Christian and Jewish together; their actions were "an open secret in the village." Other villagers helped "if only to provide a meal." Another farm couple, Alfreda and Bolesław Pietraszek, provided shelter for Jewish families consisting of 18 people in Ceranów near Sokołów Podlaski, and their neighbors brought food to those being rescued. In Markowa, where 17 Jews survived the war in hiding with their Christian neighbors, entire Polish family of Józef and Wiktoria Ulma including 6 children and prenatal child were shot dead by the Germans for hiding the Szall and Goldman families. Dorota and Antoni Szylar hid seven members of Weltz family. Julia and Józef Bar hid five members of Reisenbach family. Michal Bar hid Jakub Lorbenfeld; while Jan and Weronika Przybylak hid Jakub Einhorn.
- Tršice, Czech Republic, many people from this village helped hide a Jewish family; six of them were given the honorific of Righteous Among the Nations.
- Nieuwlande, Netherlands – during the war, this small village contained 117 inhabitants. Most households in the village and surrounding area cooperated to shelter Jews, thus making it difficult for anyone in the small village to betray their neighbors. Dozens of Jews were thus saved. Over 200 inhabitants have been honored by Yad Vashem.
- Moissac, France – There was a Jewish boarding home and orphanage in this town. When the mayor was told that the Nazis were coming, the older students would go camping for several days, the younger students were boarded with families in the area and told to be treated as members of their immediate family; the oldest students hid in the house. When it became too dangerous for the students to stay there any longer, the residents made sure that every student had a safe place to go to. If the students had to move again, the counsellors from the boarding house arranged for a new place and even escorted them to the new housing.
- The Portuguese cities of Figueira da Foz, Porto, Coimbra, Curia, Ericeira and Caldas da Rainha were assigned to house refugees. They were pleasant resorts with many available hotels. The refugees led totally ordinary lives. They were allowed to circulate freely within town limits, practice their religions, and enroll their children in local schools. "Here we were given freedom of movement; we were allowed to go on outing and live as we wished", said Ben-Zwi Kalischer. Those times were captured on films that can be found at the Steven Spielberg Film and Video Archive.
- Oľšavica, Slovakia

== Others ==
- The American Jewish Joint Distribution Committee
- The Jewish Labor Committee

== See also ==
- Arab rescue efforts during the Holocaust
- British Hero of the Holocaust
- Jewish settlement in the Japanese Empire
- Rescue of Roma during the Porajmos
- Rescuer (genocide)

== Sources ==
- Bartov, Omer (2023). "The Holocaust". The Oxford History of the Third Reich. Oxford University Press. pp. 190–216. ISBN 978-0-19-288683-5.
- Beorn, Waitman Wade (2018). The Holocaust in Eastern Europe: At the Epicenter of the Final Solution. Bloomsbury Academic. ISBN 978-1-4742-3219-7.
- Burzlaff, Jan (2020). "Confronting the Communal Grave: a Reassessment of Social Relations During the Holocaust in Eastern Europe". The Historical Journal. 63 (4): 1054–1077. doi:10.1017/S0018246X19000566. ISSN 0018-246X.
- Gerlach, Christian (2016). The Extermination of the European Jews. Cambridge University Press. ISBN 978-0-521-70689-6.
- Longerich, Peter (2010). Holocaust: The Nazi Persecution and Murder of the Jews. Oxford University Press. ISBN 978-0-19-280436-5.
