= Wojciech Rychlewicz =

Polish diplomat

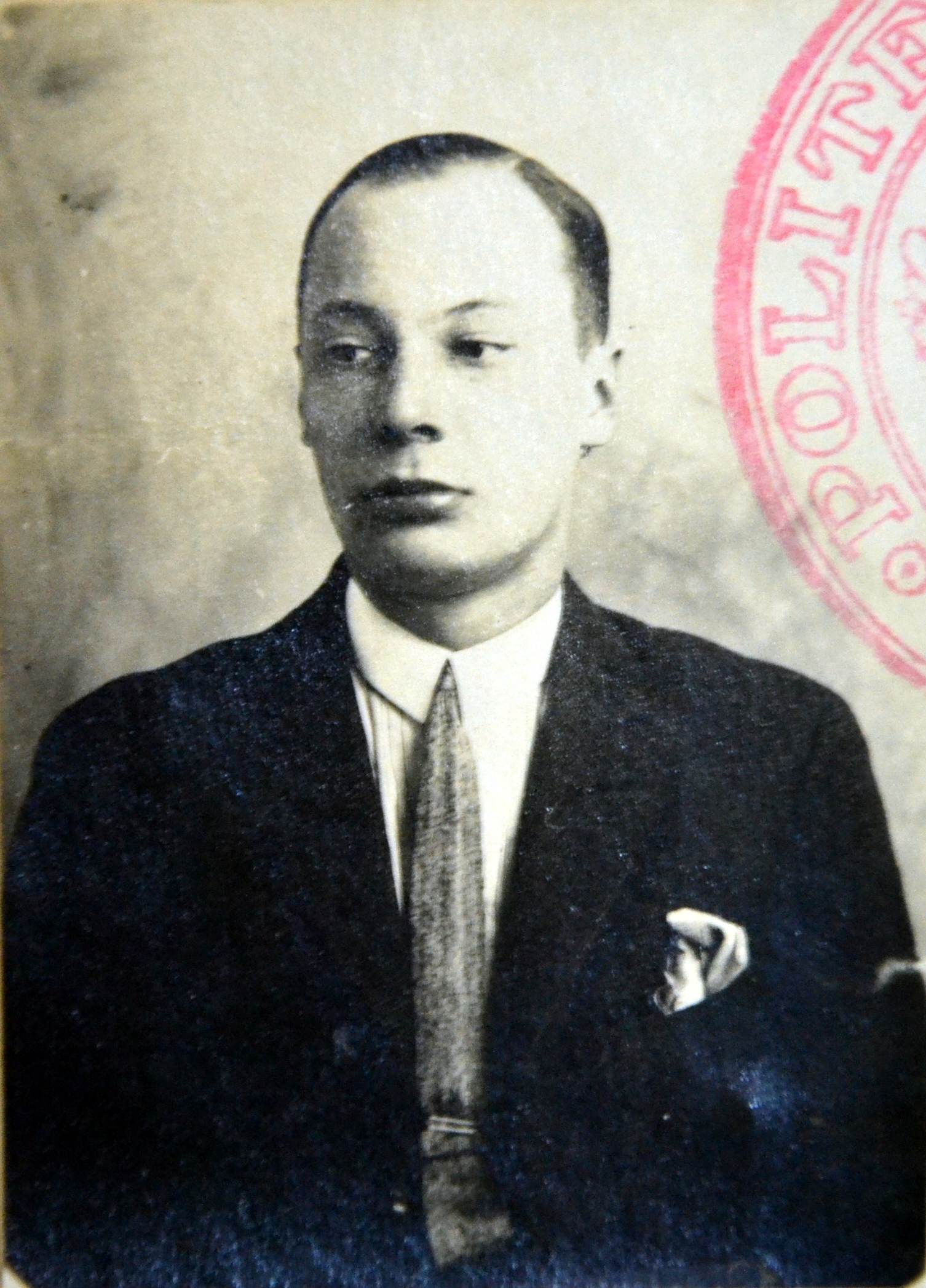
- Wojciech Rychlewicz
- Occupation: Diplomat
- Known for: Holocaust rescue

Wojciech Rychlewicz (1903 – 1964) was a Polish diplomat, consul, and between 1937 and 1941 head of the Consulate General of the Republic of Poland in Istanbul. During the Second World War, he was involved in issuing false documents to Polish Jews, which enabled them to travel to Palestine, Cyprus and the Americas.

== Life ==
=== Family and background ===
He was born into a landed gentry family from Mielnikowice, Podolia. As a 17-year-old he took part in the Polish-Soviet War. In 1920, he settled in Vilnius, where he passed his matriculation examination. He studied water engineering at the Technical University of Vilnius.

=== Diplomatic career ===
After graduation, he joined the Polish diplomatic service. In 1936, he started working at the Consulate General of the Republic of Poland in Istanbul. From 1937 to 1941, he was the head of the consulate. In June 1938, he was awarded the Silver Cross of Merit for merits in the state service.

His most important act while managing the consulate in Istanbul was to issue to thousands of Polish Jews false certificates stating that they were Polish Catholics. This enabled them to travel to Palestine, Cyprus and to several North and South American countries, escaping the Holocaust

After he finished his service at the consulate, Rychlewicz joined the Anders' Army in Palestine, with which he went on a combat trail to Italy. He ended his service with the rank of a captain in Vienna, where he aided Polish refugees. In 1946, he and his wife moved to London, where he lived until the end of his life. He died in 1964
