= Rescuer (genocide) =

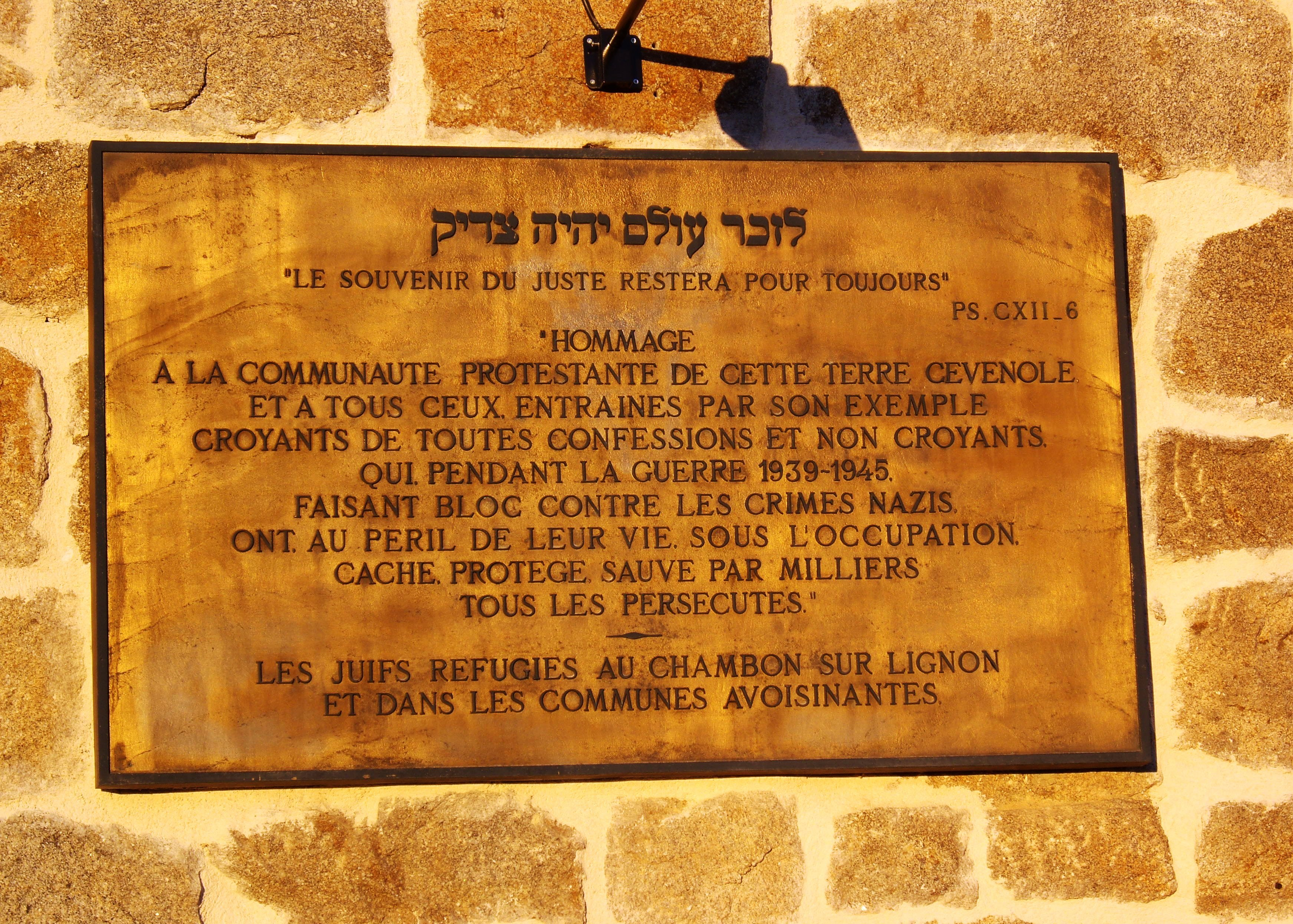
Plaque commemorating the rescue of Jews in Le Chambon-sur-Lignon

During a genocide, a rescuer or helper is someone who tries to help the genocide victims survive. In many cases, they are motivated by altruism and/or humanitarianism. The best-studied example of this phenomenon is the rescue of Jews during the Holocaust.

== See also ==
- Perpetrators, victims, and bystanders
- Rescue of Roma during the Romani Holocaust
- Rescue of Armenians during the Armenian genocide
