= Taquet =

Taquet is a surname of French origin. People with this name include:

- Adrien Taquet (born 1977), French politician
- Marie and Emile Taquet (1898–1989 and 1893–1971 respectively), Belgian married couple who saved Jewish children from the Holocaust
- Philippe Taquet (1940–2025), French paleontologist

== See also ==
- fr:Taquet (homonymie), a disambiguation page in French Wikipedia
