= Uruguayans in the Netherlands =

Uruguayans in the Netherlands (Dutch: Uruguayanen in Nederland) are people born in Uruguay who live in the Netherlands, or Dutch-born people of Uruguayan descent..

During the civic-military dictatorship of Uruguay (1973-1985) several Uruguayans went into exile in the Netherlands.

== Notable people ==
Deceased

- Yuri Banhoffer (1948–2021), footballer, who played in PEC Zwolle
- José Carbajal (1946-2010), musician

Living

- Pablo Cáceres (born 1985), footballer, who played in FC Twente and MSV Duisburg
- Pepe Fernández (born 1943), footballer, who played twice in HFC Haarlem
- Gonzalo García (born 1983), footballer, who played in SC Heerenveen, Heracles, FC Groningen, and VVV
- Matías Jones (born 1991), footballer, who played in FC Groningen and FC Emmen
- Nicolás Lodeiro (born 1989), footballer, who played in AFC Ajax
- Fernando Picún (born 1972), footballer, who played in Feyenoord
- Sergio Rochet (born 1993), football goalkeeper, who played in AZ Alkmaar
- Bruno Silva (born 1980), footballer, who played in FC Groningen and AFC Ajax
- Luis Suárez (born 1987), footballer, who played in FC Groningen and AFC Ajax
- David Texeira (born 1991), footballer, who played in FC Groningen

== See also ==
- Netherlands–Uruguay relations
- Emigration from Uruguay
- Immigration to the Netherlands
