= Liliana Picciotto =

Italian historian (born 1947)

Liliana Picciotto Fargion
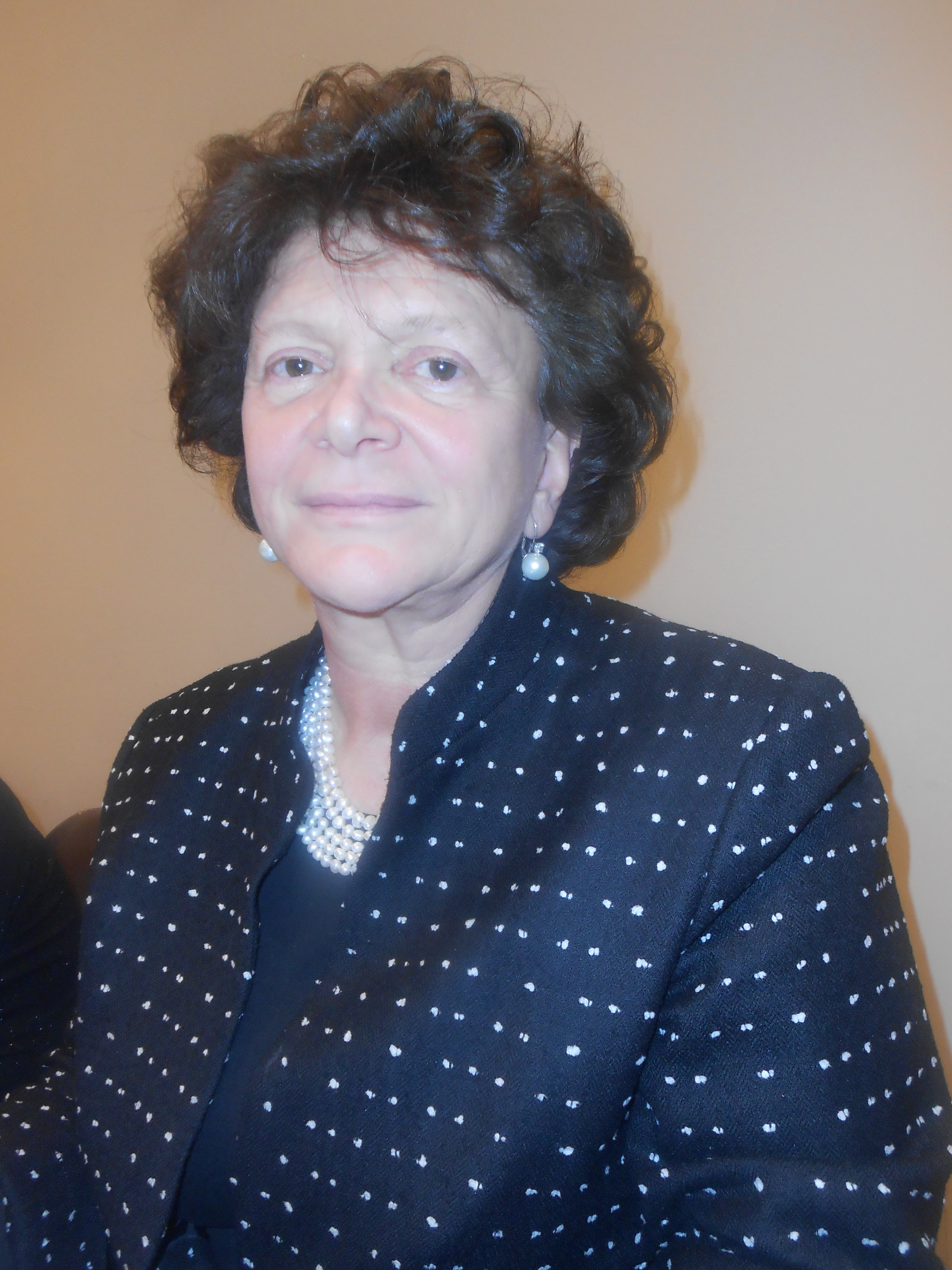
- Born: 1947 (age 78–79)
- Occupation: Historian

Liliana Picciotto Fargion (Cairo, 1947) is an Egyptian-born Italian historian of Syrian-Jewish descent. She specializes in the history of the Jews in Italy.

== Works ==
- L'occupazione tedesca e gli ebrei di Roma, Roma-Milano, Carucci-C.D.E.C., 1989.
- L'immagine dell'ebreo nell'Italia degli Anni '80, in La Rassegna Mensile di Israel, n. 3, 1991.
- Il libro della memoria. Gli Ebrei deportati dall'Italia (1943–1945), Milano, Mursia, 1992, ISBN 978-88-4250-779-6. - nuova ed. aumentata, Milano, Mursia, 2002, ISBN 978-88-425-2964-4.
- Gli ebrei in provincia di Milano 1943–1945, Milano, Provincia di Milano e CDEC, 1992.
- Per ignota destinazione. Gli Ebrei sotto il nazismo, Collezione Le Scie, Milano, Mondadori, 1994, ISBN 978-88-043-7429-9.
- Saggi sull'ebraismo italiano del Novecento in onore di Luisella Mortara Ottolenghi, in La Rassegna Mensile di Israel, n. 1–2, 2003.
- L'alba ci colse come un tradimento. Gli ebrei nel campo di Fossoli 1943–1944, Collezione Le Scie, Milano, Mondadori, 2010, ISBN 978-88-045-8596-1.
- Salvarsi. Gli ebrei d'Italia sfuggiti alla Shoah. 1943–1945, Collana Storia, Torino, Einaudi, 2017, ISBN 978-88-584-2695-1.

== Translations ==
- Giorgio Nissim, Memorie di un ebreo toscano 1938–1948, Collana Studi storici, Roma, Carocci, 2005, ISBN 978-88-430-3596-0.
- I giusti d'Italia. I non ebrei che salvarono gli ebrei. 1943–1945, a cura di Israel Gutman e Bracha Rivlin, con un messaggio di Carlo Azeglio Ciampi, prefazione di Gianfranco Fini, Collezione Le Scie, Milano, Mondadori, 2006, ISBN 978-88-045-5127-0.

== Filmography ==
- Memoria, regia di Ruggero Gabbai, 1997
- Gli ebrei di Fossoli, regia di Ruggero Gabbai, 2006
- Il viaggio più lungo. Rodi-Auschwitz, regia di Ruggero Gabbai, 2013
- La razzia. Roma 16 ottobre 1943, regia di Ruggero Gabbai, 2018

== See also ==
- Centro di Documentazione Ebraica Contemporanea
