= Netherlands–Uruguay relations =

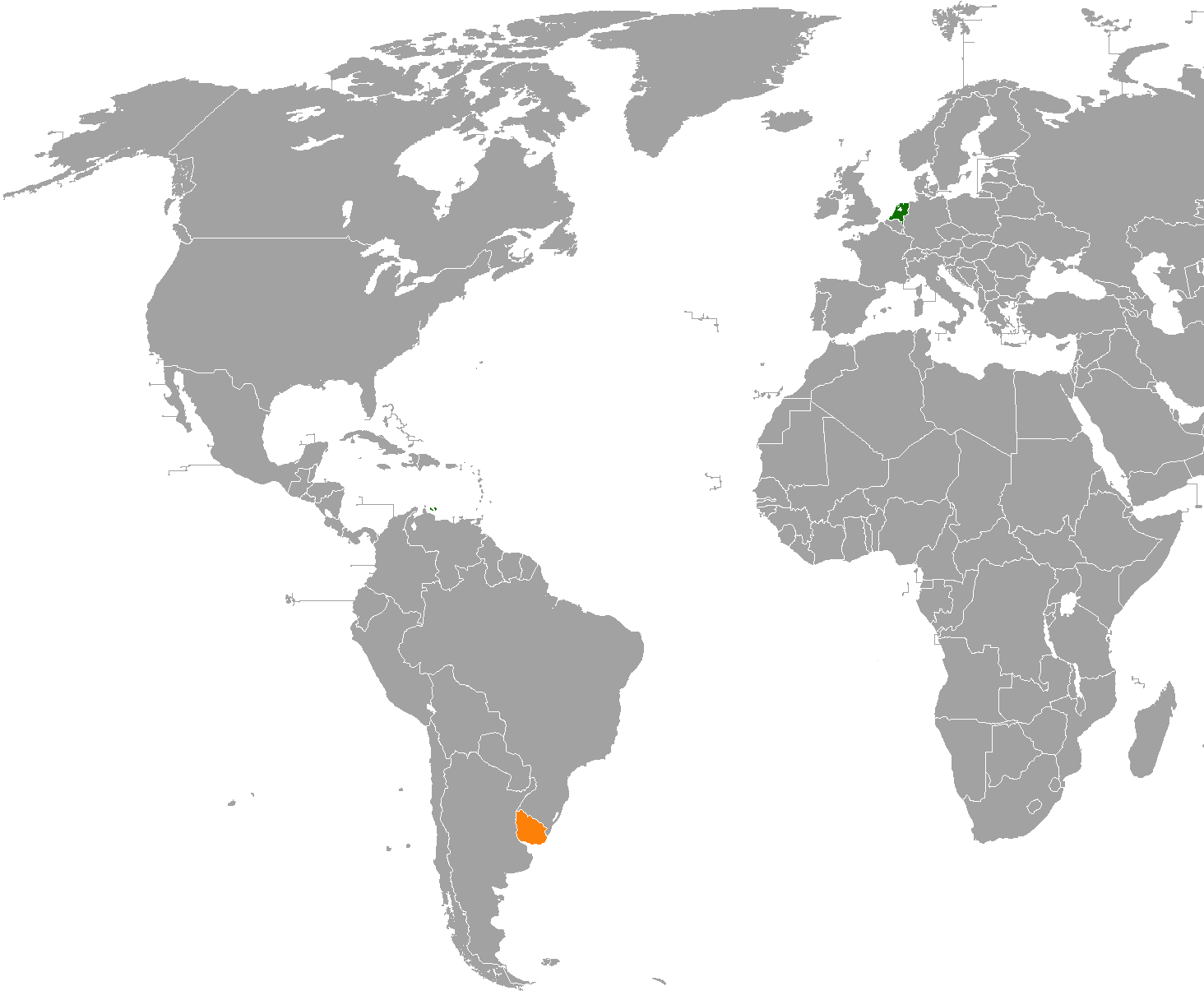
- Netherlands: Uruguay

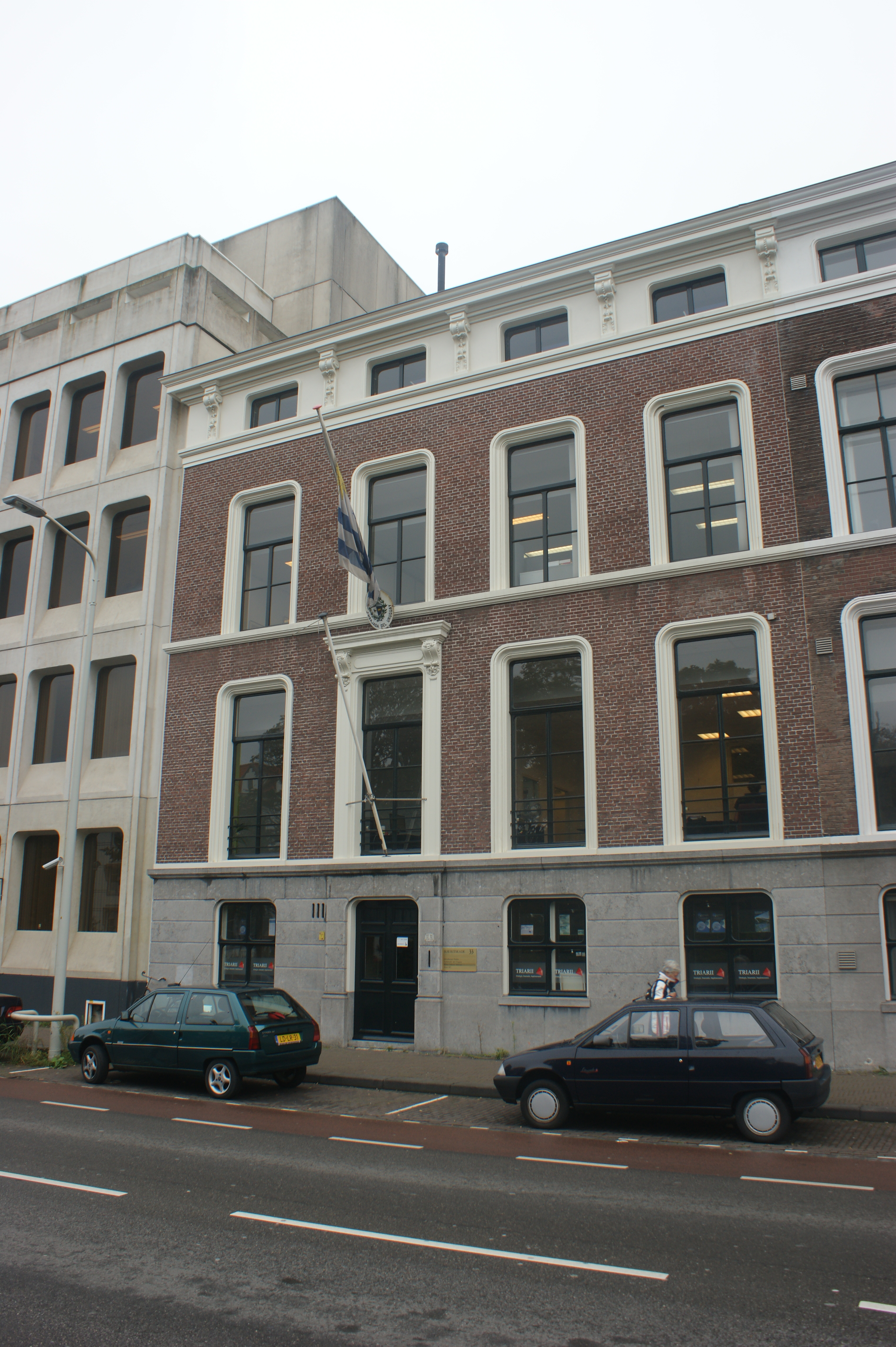
Embassy of Uruguay, Mauritskade 33, The Hague.

The Netherlands is accredited to Uruguay from its embassy in Buenos Aires, Argentina, and honorary consulate in Montevideo. Uruguay has an embassy in The Hague.

There are small numbers of Dutch immigrants in Uruguay. In the last decades of the 20th century, some Uruguayans immigrated to the Netherlands.

Both countries have subscribed a series of bilateral agreements:

- Investment promotion and protection agreement (1988)
- Tax information exchange (2013)

The Netherlands are a significant destination for Uruguayan exports.

== Resident diplomatic missions ==
- the Netherlands is accredited to Uruguay from its embassy in Buenos Aires, Argentina.
- Uruguay has an embassy in The Hague.

== See also ==
- Foreign relations of the Netherlands
- Foreign relations of Uruguay
- Uruguayans in the Netherlands
