= Rescue of Roma during the Romani Holocaust =

During World War II, some individuals and groups helped Romani people and others escape the Porajmos conducted by Nazi Germany.

== In Crimea ==
Because Romani Crimean Tatars are sometimes considered to be the fourth subethnic group of the Crimean Tatar people, Crimean Tatars undertook large-scale efforts to rescue their Romani brothers, both on a collective and individual basis. Crimean Tatars utilized both direct appeals to Nazi authorities, begging them to spare the Roma in petitions, to quietly helping them register themselves as Tatars and maintain their disguise or sheltering them in their houses from massacres.

Nazi occupiers frequently demanded lists of Romani Crimean Tatars from Muslim authorities in Crimea, but Crimean Tatars almost always refused to provide such lists. While initially not all rescue efforts were successful: for example, the Nazis ignored the pleas of a group of three respected Crimean Tatar elders in the village of Asan-bey who begged them to spare the Roma who had been just rounded up. However, Crimean Tatars continued to collectively work together to deceive the Nazi occupiers about the identities of the Crimean Roma, distributing leaflets and printing articles in newspapers proclaiming that alleged Crimean Roma were actually victims of mistaken identity who came from other national origins, (Note: In an effort to save the Romani Crimean Tatars, Gadjo Crimean Tatars frequently gave other explanations for origins of Romani Crimean Tatars, with some claiming that they were Turkmen tribesmen mistaken for Romani people, or alternatively, of Persian origin.)

Because most Crimean Roma were recorded as Tatars in their passports and the censuses even before the Nazi occupation, it is impossible to determine the exact survival rate given the lack of consensus among historians on the pre-Holocaust population of the Crimean Roma in the first place and uncertainly about the exact number of Crimean Roma killed by the Nazis. Nazi reports on murders of Crimean Roma also would refer to the victims by a variety of ambiguous terms such as "asocials" and "saboteurs," complicating attempts to figure out how many Crimean Roma were killed by the Nazis. Lower estimates of survival rates hover at around 30%, but it is likely that the survival rate is much higher when taking into account that so many Crimean Roma were registered as Tatars. This ambiguity in their survival rate is complicated by the fact that it is unclear how many alleged "tatar-gypsies" killed by the Nazis were actually Gadjo victims of mistaken identity; for example, the surviving residents of Burlak-toma (Note: Also spelled as Burlak-tama.) village unanimously gave sworn testimony that the victims of the massacre in their village on 28 March 1942 were all just Gadjo Crimean Tatars falsely accused of being "tatar-gypsies" by the local village headman, Matvei Krivoruchko. Many of the victims of the Simferopol massacre told the Nazis that they were Tatars, and others said they were Turkmen, which was at the time the self-name of the Tayfa Crimean Tatars whose origins remain disputed. (Note: Tayfa Crimean Tatars, many of whom were killed in the Holocaust, used to call themselves Turkmens, while other Crimean Tatars called them Gurbets at the time. Both anthropologists and the Tayfa community themselves continue to have a difference of opinion on their origins, with some academics saying they are a subgroup of Romani people while others hold the opinion that they are Gadjo, possibly of Kurdish origin.)

Romani communities in many Crimean Tatar majority cities such as Bakhchisarai were spared the Holocaust, in contrast to the Romani communities who inhabited slavic-majority cities like Simferopol that were not able to escape the city were hit hard by the Holocaust, which the Nazis noted was supported by most of the population. In the end, Crimean Tatar efforts to save the Roma resulted in the Nazis giving up on the extermination of the remaining Crimean Roma. Romani Crimean Tatars who survived the Holocaust because they were registered as Tatars were subject to Deportation.

== In the Balkans ==
The Bosniaks from Zenica published a declaration stressing the special position of the so called White Gipsy/Bijeli cigo a sedentary Muslim Roma community, and with help of religious authorities in Sarajevo, the declaration influenced the Ustaše authorities to make a special provision in May 1942 to spare Muslim Roma residing in Bosnia and Herzegovina from deportation to the concentration camps to Jasenovac.

== See also ==
- Rescue of Jews during the Holocaust
