= Giovanni Palatucci =

Italian police official

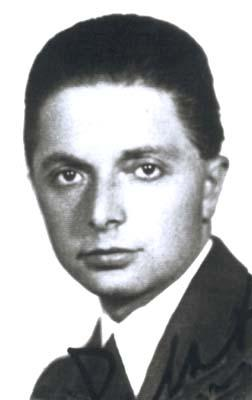
Giovanni Palatucci

Giovanni Palatucci (31 May 1909 – 10 February 1945) was an Italian police official who was long believed to have saved thousands of Jews in Fiume between 1939 and 1944 (current Rijeka in Croatia) from being deported to Nazi extermination camps. In 2013 a research panel of historians led by the Centro Primo Levi reviewed almost 700 documents and concluded that Palatucci had followed Italian Social Republic and German orders concerning the Jews and enabling the deportation of the majority of the 570 Jews living in Fiume and surrounding areas, 412 of whom were deported to Auschwitz, a higher percentage than in any Italian city. The matter is currently the topic of scholarly debate. A national commission of historians recommended by the Union of the Italian Jewish Communities, the Center for Contemporary Jewish Documentation in Milan, the Italian Ministry of the Interior and the Centro Primo Levi NY is conducting a comprehensive review of the documents.

Arrested on charges of treason and embezzlement, Palatucci was deported to Dachau concentration camp. He died there of typhus months before the camp's liberation.

== Biography ==
Palatucci was born in Montella, Avellino, Italy. He graduated from the University of Turin, Faculty of Law in 1932. In 1936, he entered police service in Genoa, and the following year he was assigned to Fiume. For 5 decades, Palatucci was believed to have been Fiume Chief of Police, and that he used his power to help the Jews until he was arrested. Even though already in 1994 historian Marco Coslovich published the documents showing that Palatucci never had more than a subordinate administrative role, in which he excelled and for which he was praised by his superiors, the misrepresentation of his position continued until 2013, when the Holocaust Museum stated in its anniversary exhibition that Palatucci "used his power of Chief of Police to help the Jews".

Palatucci, known as “the Italian Schindler,” has long been credited with saving thousands of Jews during the Holocaust while serving in the police department in the city of Fiume, and was designated by Yad Vashem as one of the Righteous Among the Nations.

After the promulgation of racial laws against Jews in 1938 and at the beginning of World War II in 1939, Palatucci was chief of the Foreigners' Office. According to his hagiographers, he began falsifying documents and visas.

The documentary report issued by Centro Primo Levi NY in 2013 demonstrates that no evidence or testimony of such activity was ever found. Moreover, the report reviews in depth hundreds of police records preserved at the State Archive of Rijeka showing that one of Palatucci's main activities between 1938 and 1943 was the compilation and update of the census of the Jews. The census was the principal instrument in the application of the Racial Laws and in Fiume it was compiled and maintained with unparalleled thoroughness.

Hagiographers also claim that when Palatucci "officially deported" Jews, he instead arranged for them to be sent to Campagna, telling them to contact his uncle, the Catholic Bishop of Campagna Giuseppe Maria Palatucci, who would offer them the greatest assistance possible.

Already Marco Coslovich in 1994 had demonstrated through extensive documentation that Palatucci and the Police of Fiume had no power to decide internment location for the Jews. More recently, the database of foreign Jews interned in Italy curated by Anna Pizzuti provided unequivocal evidence of the implausibility of this theory. As published in Pizzuti's documentary resource, the Jews deported from Fiume to Campagna are 40. Moreover, 10 of this allegedly "protected group" ended up in Auschwitz.

Hagiographers also claim that he managed to destroy all documented records of some 10,000 Jewish refugees living in the town, issuing them false papers and providing them with funds. This theory has been questioned by several historians, including Marco Coslovich and Silva Bon. The latter, in her "The Jewish Communities of Fiume and the Carnaro" (Trieste, 2001) argued that, based on official records, the Germans and the RSI police conducted the arrests of the Jews through the lists of the Italian police. The arrests began in October 1943 and were organized first as round-ups and then as targeted operations in which the Italian Questura provided information to both locate and identify Fiume Jews. Both German and Italian records indicate that by June 1944 hardly any Jews had remained in Fiume. Moreover, if local records had been destroyed, something of which there is no sign, those refugees would still appear in the central police archive that kept copies of all local police headquarters as well as in the records of the Italian DP camps after the war, which is not the case.

Following the 1943 capitulation of Italy, Fiume was occupied by the Nazis. Purportedly, he continued to clandestinely help Jews and maintain contact with the Resistance, until his activities were discovered by the Gestapo.

However, both German and Italian documents show that Palatucci was arrested for treason and for having transmitted to Britain official documents requesting negotiations for Fiume’s post-war status under Italian aegis.

As the imminent defeat of the Axis became clear, many RSI officers began to negotiate with the Allies concerning Italy's post-war fate and their own. The tensions between the German and Italian RSI forces grew harsher. On the Eastern border, near Fiume, British support of Yugoslav resistance fighters grew stronger, causing continuous attacks. Palatucci's highest superior, to whom he reported, Tullio Tamburini, was arrested in June for treason and embezzlement and deported to Dachau. After the liberation of Florence, in August 1944, Roberto Tomasselli, his direct superior and protector who had left him in his place, defected from the ranks of Salò and ended up in an Anglo-American POW camp. His chief of cabinet and close collaborator in Fiume left for Milan, where he served Mussolini's ailing administration briefly and passed to the Liberation forces before the Allies entered the city.

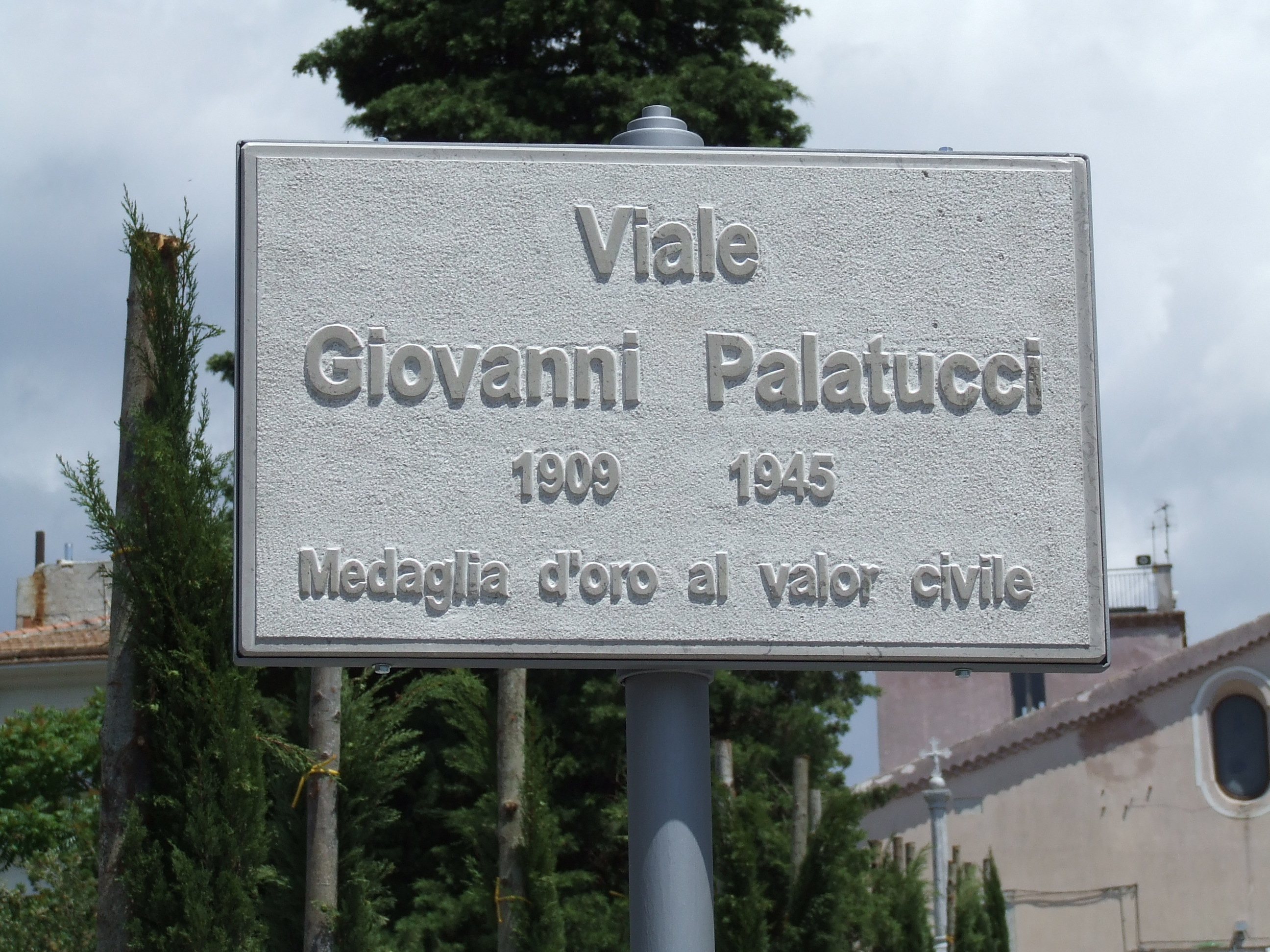
A road named after Giovanni Palatucci.

On 13 September 1944, Palatucci was arrested. Oral sources claim that he was condemned to death, but no documentary evidence of this fact ever emerged. Along with other Italian policemen from Fiume and Trieste who were also accused of treason and embezzlement, he was deported to the Dachau concentration camp, where he died during the typhus epidemic on 9 February 1945, before the camp was liberated by the Allies on 29 April 1945.

The Yad Vashem Holocaust Memorial honoured him in 1990 as Righteous Among the Nations, for helping one Jewish woman. The Institute of the Righteous commission in 1990 found no evidence that he might have assisted anyone outside of this case. In October 2002, the Pope's vicar in Rome opened a beatification case for Palatucci, but in June 2013 the Vatican announced that it had asked a historian to review the new findings.

== Allegations of collaboration ==
According to the 2013 research, the story surrounding Palatucci stemmed from the activity of Bishop Giuseppe Maria Palatucci and Rodolfo Grani, a Jewish man from Fiume who had briefly been interned in Campagna and remained friendly with the bishop after the war. As shown in the 2013 report, the main narrative of all rescue operations attributed to Palatucci can be found in a speech that the bishop delivered in Ramat Gan (Tel Aviv) on the occasion of a dead boy ceremony in honour of his nephew. According to the CPL report, there is no evidence that Grani ever died, returned to Fiume after 1940 or even met Giovanni Palatucci.

Michael Day asked in The Independent newspaper how Palatucci helped "more than 5,000 Jews to escape in a region where officially, the Jewish population was half that". Anna Pizzuti, editor of the database of foreign Jewish internees in Italy, told Corriere Della Sera that it was impossible that Palatucci could have rerouted thousands of Jews to Campagna when "no more than 40 Fiume residents were interned in Campagna; and a third of these ended up in Auschwitz".

The Giovanni Palatucci Foundation, which campaigns for Palatucci's beatification, criticized what it called "revisionist historians", and cites on its website individual cases where Jews claim relatives were saved by Palatucci’s direct intervention. It also said that critics who claim it is untenable to suggest he saved 5,000 Jews in an area with a Jewish population of just half that number have failed to take into account the huge number of migrant Jews from eastern or central Europe who may have been present.

However, to date, all research concerning the influx of Jewish refugees through Italy's eastern border, including works by Klaus Voigt, Liliana Picciotto and Anna Pizzuti, concurs that very few refugees were able to pass through Fiume.

The historian of Early Modern Europe Anna Foa of Sapienza University of Rome wrote in a June 2013 article for the Vatican newspaper L'Osservatore Romano that the decision to reclassify Palatucci, a Catholic, as a collaborator was hasty, but conceded that more study was needed. She asserted that the target of the move against Palatucci was the papacy of Pope Pius XII, and wrote that "in targeting Palatucci the desire was essentially to hit a Catholic involved in rescuing Jews in support of the idea that the Church spared no effort to help the Jews — a person whose cause of beatification was under way. ... But this is ideology and not history." Foa argued that "Palatucci may have saved only a few dozen lives instead of the 5,000 attributed to him". She agreed that Palatucci's achievements have at times been exaggerated based on the limited evidence, but noted that scholars should be cautious about jumping to conclusions given the paucity of evidence. Foa claimed that there are many testimonies in favor of Palatucci and concluded that before a definitive determination can be made about Palatucci's role in the Holocaust, the documentation used by the Primo Levi Center would have to be made available for other historians to review. The New York Times reported a reply from Centro Primo Levi's director, Natalia Indrimi, stating that the documents have been available to the scholarly community since the inception of the project, and that, if testimonies are available, they should be made public.

Fr. Murray K. Watson, vice-rector and assistant professor of Sacred Scripture and Ecumenism at St. Peter's Seminary in Ontario, said in June 2013, "I think a judicious patience as regards this question is probably wise, since even the scholars familiar with this material disagree about its meaning and interpretation."
