= Marie and Emile Taquet =

Marie Taquet (1898–1989) and Emile Taquet (1893–1971) were a husband and wife team who saved Jewish children from The Holocaust. She was born in Luxembourg in 1898; they married around 1918. (This would make her in her forties during World War II.)

They ran a residence for children in Belgium, and hid significant numbers of Jewish children among the general population of the school.

One source describes the residence as a school for the children of Belgian military families, and her husband as a Belgian Army officer. That account says that he was the school's administrator, and she the headmistress. It says that the Gestapo visited. It calls the school "Reine Elizabeth Castle" (Reine meaning "Queen"), and places it in Jamoigne, Belgium.

Another source describes the residence as a home for disabled children, which does not preclude it from being a home/ school for the children of Belgium officer's children. This source calls it the Queen Elisabeth Home, and says it was in the Chateau du Faing, in the village of Jamoigne-sur-Semois. The castle was said to belong to the Sisters of Charity of Besançon. In "Rescuers", with an interview with Mrs Taquet, 1988, the school is described as "the Castle of Jamoigne, a school for boys whose fathers were in the military." It also says "at least 80 Jewish boys regard her as the woman to whom they own their lives".

A resource for teachers on the University of South Florida's site says that the couple protected 80 Jewish boys.

Mrs Taquet died in September 1989, having been in a nursing home outside Brussels just before that.

The story of their brave actions was the subject of the 1998 TV drama "Rescuers: Stories of Courage", the Marie Taquet episode. (There were six episodes in the series). It starred Linda Hamilton (of "Terminator" fame)as Marie Taquet, Alfred Molina as her husband. It was directed by Lynne Littman. One source gives her name as Maria Taquet-Martens.

Recollections of one of the children saved by the Taquets:

I was four when {my brother and I} left home.... We remember it as a good time.... My most vivid memory is of Madame Taquet kissing each of us goodnight every night... the good boys and the bad. When {upon liberation} my father came to pick me up, I did not recognize him. I said "Hello, Monsieur"...

The castle stayed open until June 1946 because many of the parents of the Jewish children did not return.
