= Rescue of Jews by Poles during the Holocaust =

Death penalty for the rescue of Jews in occupied Poland
- Public announcement
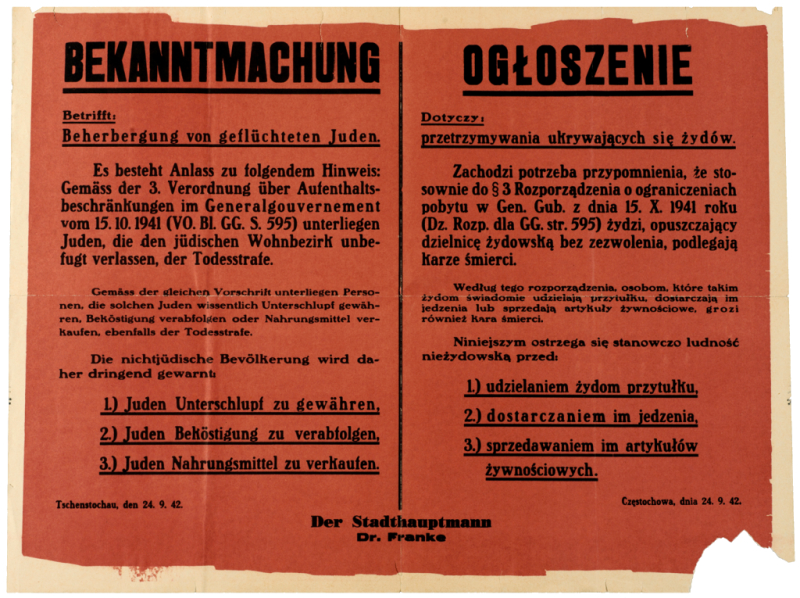
- NOTICE Concerning: the Sheltering of Escaping Jews. There is a need for a reminder, that in accordance with Paragraph 3 of the decree of 15 October 1941, on the Limitation of Residence in General Government (page 595 of the GG Register) Jews leaving the Jewish Quarter without permission will incur the death penalty. According to this decree, those knowingly helping these Jews by providing shelter, supplying food, or selling them foodstuffs are also subject to the death penalty This is a categorical warning to the non-Jewish population against: 1) Providing shelter to Jews, 2) Supplying them with Food, 3) Selling them Foodstuffs. Tschenstochau, Częstochowa, 24.9.42 Der Stadthauptmann; Dr. Franke

Polish Jews were the primary victims of the Nazi Germany-organized Holocaust in Poland. Throughout the German occupation of Poland, Jews were rescued from the Holocaust by Polish people, at risk to their lives and the lives of their families. According to Yad Vashem, Israel's official memorial to the victims of the Holocaust, Poles were, by nationality, the most numerous persons identified as rescuing Jews during the Holocaust. By January 2023, 7,280 people in Poland have been recognized by the State of Israel as Righteous among the Nations.

The Polish government-in-exile informed the world of the extermination of the Jews on June 9, 1942, following a report from the Jewish Labour Bund leadership smuggled out of the occupied Poland by Home Army couriers. The Polish government-in-exile, together with several Jewish groups, pleaded for Allied forces to bomb train tracks leading to the Auschwitz concentration camp, although, for debated reasons, the Allies did not do so. The rescue efforts were aided by one of the largest resistance movements in Europe, the Polish Underground State and its military arm, the Home Army. Supported by the Government Delegation for Poland, the most notable effort dedicated to helping Jews was spearheaded by the Żegota Council, based in Warsaw, with branches in Kraków, Wilno, and Lwów.

Polish rescuers were hampered by the German occupation as well as frequent betrayal by the local population. Any kind of help to Jews was punishable by death, for the rescuer and their family, and would-be rescuers moved in an environment hostile to Jews and their protection, exposed to the risk of blackmail and denunciation by neighbours. According to Mordecai Paldiel, "The threats faced by would-be rescuers, both from the Germans and blackmailers alike, make us place Polish rescuers of Jews in a special category, for they exemplified a courage, fortitude, and lofty humanitarianism unequalled in other occupied countries."

== Background ==
Before World War II, 3,300,000 Jewish people lived in Poland – ten percent of the general population of some 33 million. Poland was the center of the European Jewish world.

The Second World War began with the German invasion of Poland on 1 September 1939; and, on 17 September, in accordance with the Molotov–Ribbentrop Pact, the Soviet Union invaded Poland from the east. By October 1939, the Second Polish Republic was split in half between two totalitarian powers. Germany occupied 48.4 percent of western and central Poland. Racial policy of Nazi Germany regarded Poles as "sub-human" and Polish Jews beneath that category, validating a campaign of unrestricted violence. One aspect of German foreign policy in conquered Poland was to prevent its ethnically diverse population from uniting against Germany. The Nazi plan for Polish Jews was one of concentration, isolation, and eventually total annihilation in the Holocaust also known as the Shoah. Similar policy measures toward the Polish Catholic majority focused on the murder or suppression of political, religious, and intellectual leaders as well as the Germanization of the annexed lands which included a program to resettle ethnic Germans from the Baltic states and other regions onto farms, ventures and homes formerly owned by the expelled Poles including Polish Jews.

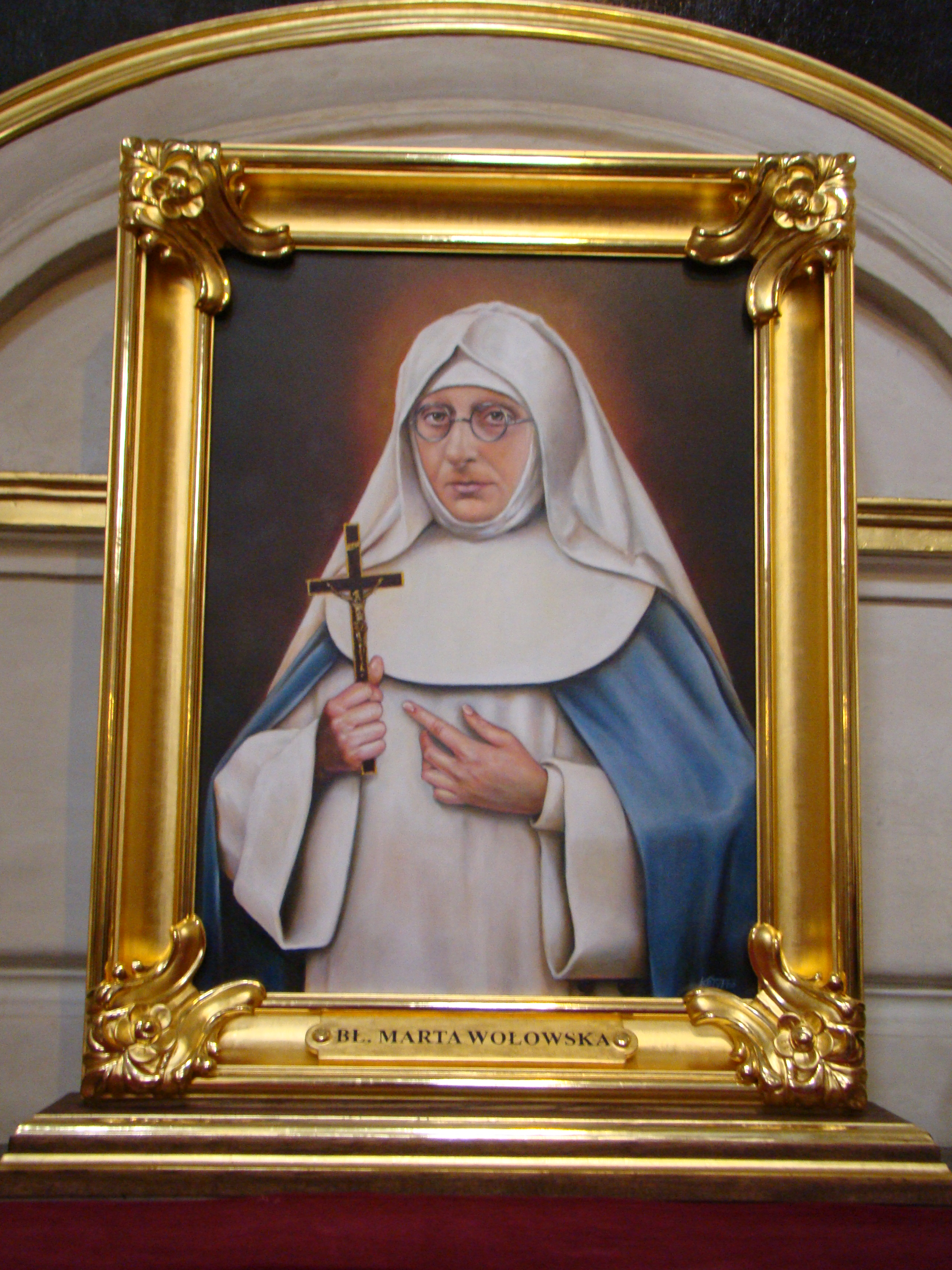
Beatified Sister Marta Wołowska of Słonim, murdered for rescuing Jewish families from the Słonim Ghetto and hiding them in her monastery.

The response of the Polish majority to the Jewish Holocaust covered an extremely wide spectrum, often ranging from acts of altruism at the risk of endangering their own and their families lives, through compassion, to passivity, indifference, blackmail, and denunciation. That response has been the subject of intense historical and political controversy since the 1980s, when the received notion of the Polish people standing united and unwavering against the German occupier was criticised by Israeli historians, such as Israel Gutman and Shmuel Krakowski, and by Polish intellectuals and historians, such as Jan Błoński and in 2000 Jan T. Gross's book, Neighbors: The Destruction of the Jewish Community in Jedwabne, Poland. New trends in historical research challenged widely shared assumptions about wartime Polish behaviour and highlighted the contribution of home-grown antisemitism and the local police to the extermination of Polish Jews. Polish rescuers faced threats from unsympathetic neighbours, Polish-German Volksdeutsche, ethnic Ukrainian pro-Nazis, blackmailers called szmalcowniks, the Blue Police, and Jewish collaborators, Żagiew and Group 13.

In 1941, at the onset of Operation Barbarossa, the invasion of the Soviet Union, the main architect of the Holocaust, Reinhard Heydrich, issued his operational guidelines for the mass anti-Jewish actions carried out with the participation of local gentiles. Massacres of Polish Jews by the Ukrainian and Lithuanian auxiliary police battalions followed. Deadly pogroms were committed in over 30 locations across formerly Soviet-occupied parts of Poland, including in Brześć, Tarnopol, Białystok, Łuck, Lwów, Stanisławów, and in Wilno where the Jews were murdered along with the Poles in the Ponary massacre at a ratio of 3-to-1. National minorities routinely participated in pogroms led by OUN-UPA, YB, TDA and BKA. Local participation in the Nazi German "cleansing" operations included the Jedwabne pogrom of 1941. The Einsatzkommandos were ordered to organize them in all eastern territories occupied by Germany.

Rudolf Weigl, Polish Righteous whose vaccines, smuggled into the Lwów and Warsaw Ghettos, saved countless Jewish lives.

Ethnic Poles assisted Jews by organized as well as by individual efforts. Food was offered to Polish Jews or left in places Jews would pass on their way to forced labor. Other Poles directed Jewish ghetto escapees to Poles who could help them. Some Poles sheltered Jews for only one or a few nights; others assumed full responsibility for their survival, fully aware that the Germans punished by summary execution those (as well as their families) who helped Jews.

A special role fell to Polish physicians who saved thousands of Jews. Dr. Eugeniusz Łazowski, known as the "Polish Schindler", saved 8,000 Polish Jews in Rozwadów from deportation to death camps by simulating a typhus epidemic. Dr. Tadeusz Pankiewicz gave out free medicines in the Kraków Ghetto, saving an unspecified number of Jews. Professor Rudolf Weigl, inventor of the first effective vaccine against epidemic typhus, employed and protected Jews in his Weigl Institute in Lwów; his vaccines were smuggled into the Lwów and Warsaw Ghettos, saving countless lives. Dr. Tadeusz Kosibowicz, director of the state hospital in Będzin, was sentenced to death for rescuing Jewish fugitives (but the sentence was commuted to camp imprisonment, and he survived the war).

=== Commemoration ===
Those who took full responsibility for Jews' survival, perhaps especially, merit recognition as Righteous among the Nations. 6,066 Poles have been recognized by Israel's Yad Vashem as Polish Righteous among the Nations for saving Jews during the Jewish Holocaust, making Poland the country with the highest number of such Righteous.

Commemoration of Polish rescuers became more common after Polish transition to democracy. By late 2010s, Poland had four museums with exhibitions dedicated to, or entirely focused on, commemorating rescuers (the Eagle Pharmacy, Żabiński Villa, POLIN Museum of the History of Polish Jews and the Markowa Ulma-Family Museum of Poles Who Saved Jews in World War II). The commemoration has also attracted criticism as being politicized and related to ethnonationalist agenda.

=== Statistics ===
The number of Poles who rescued Jews from the Nazi German persecution would be hard to determine in black-and-white terms and is still the subject of scholarly debate. According to Gunnar S. Paulsson, the number of rescuers that meet Yad Vashem's criteria is perhaps 100,000 and there may have been two or three times as many who offered minor help; the majority "were passively protective." In an article published in the Journal of Genocide Research, Hans G. Furth estimated that there may have been as many as 1,200,000 Polish rescuers. Władysław Bartoszewski estimated that between 1 and 3 percent of the Polish population was actively involved in rescue efforts; Marcin Urynowicz estimates that a minimum of from 500,000 to over a million Poles actively tried to help Jews. The lower number was proposed by Teresa Prekerowa who claimed that between 160,000 and 360,000 Poles assisted in hiding Jews, amounting to between 1% and 2.5% of the 15 million adult Poles she categorized as "those who could offer help." Her estimation counts only those who were involved in hiding Jews directly. It also assumes that each Jew who hid among the non-Jewish populace stayed throughout the war in only one hiding place and as such had only one set of helpers. However, other historians indicate that a much higher number was involved. Paulsson wrote that, according to his research, an average Jew in hiding stayed in seven different places throughout the war.

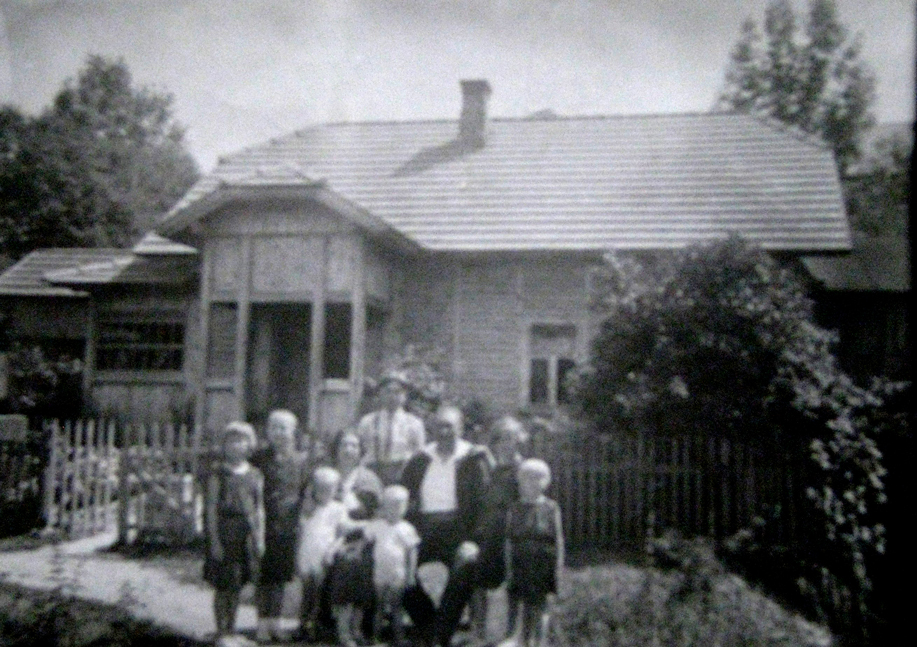
The Król family of Polish Righteous west of Nowy Sącz Ghetto hid Jewish friends in the attic for three years. In close proximity, the Germans carried out mass executions of civilians.

An average Jew who survived in occupied Poland depended on many acts of assistance and tolerance, wrote Paulsson. "Nearly every Jew that was rescued, was rescued by the cooperative efforts of dozen or more people," as confirmed also by the Polish-Jewish historian Szymon Datner. Paulsson notes that during the six years of wartime and occupation, the average Jew sheltered by the Poles had three or four sets of false documents and faced recognition as a Jew multiple times. Datner explains also that hiding a Jew lasted often for several years thus increasing the risk involved for each Christian family exponentially. Polish-Jewish writer and Holocaust survivor Hanna Krall has identified 45 Poles who helped to shelter her from the Nazis and Władysław Szpilman, the Jewish Polish musician whose wartime experiences were chronicled in his memoir The Pianist and the film of the same title identified 30 Poles who helped him to survive the Holocaust.

Meanwhile, Father John T. Pawlikowski from Chicago, referring to work by other historians, speculated that claims of hundreds of thousands of rescuers struck him as inflated. Likewise, Martin Gilbert has written that under Nazi regime, rescuers were an exception, albeit one that could be found in towns and villages throughout Poland.

=== Difficulties ===
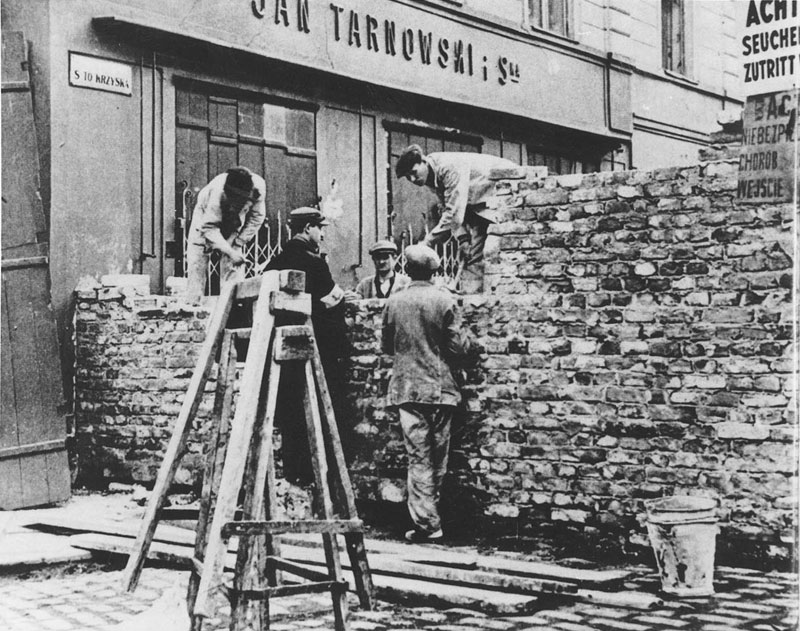
The wall of the ghetto in Warsaw, being constructed by Nazi German order in August 1940

Efforts at rescue were encumbered by several factors. The threat of the death penalty for aiding Jews and the limited ability to provide for the escapees were often responsible for the fact that many Poles were unwilling to provide direct help to a person of Jewish origin. This was exacerbated by the fact that the people who were in hiding did not have official ration cards and hence food for them had to be purchased on the black market at high prices. According to Emmanuel Ringelblum in most cases the money that Poles accepted from Jews they helped to hide, was taken not out of greed, but out of poverty which Poles had to endure during the German occupation. Israel Gutman has written that the majority of Jews who were sheltered by Poles paid for their own up-keep, but thousands of Polish protectors perished along with the people they were hiding.

Several scholars such as Richard C. Lukas and John Connelly have stated that, unlike in Western Europe, Polish collaboration with the Nazi Germans was insignificant. (This characterization is disputed.) Connelly nonetheless criticized the same population for its indifference to the Jewish plight. This occurred in the context of Nazi terror combined with the inadequacy of food rations, greed and corruption, which wrecked traditional values. Poles helping Jews faced unparalleled dangers not only from the German occupiers but also from their own ethnically diverse countrymen including Polish-German Volksdeutsche, and Polish Ukrainians, many of whom were anti-Semitic and morally disoriented by the war. There were people, the so-called szmalcownicy ("shmalts people" from shmalts or szmalec, slang term for money), who blackmailed the hiding Jews and Poles helping them, or who turned the Jews to the Germans for a reward. Outside the cities there were peasants of various ethnic backgrounds looking for Jews hiding in the forests, to demand money from them. There were also Jews turning in other Jews and ethnic Poles in order to alleviate hunger with the awarded prize. The vast majority of these individuals joined the criminal underworld after the German occupation and were responsible for the deaths of tens of thousands of people, both Jews and the Poles who were trying to save them.

According to one reviewer of Paulsson, with regard to the extortionists, "a single hooligan or blackmailer could wreak severe damage on Jews in hiding, but it took the silent passivity of a whole crowd to maintain their cover." He also notes that "hunters" were outnumbered by "helpers" by a ratio of one to 20 or 30.

Michael C. Steinlauf writes that not only the fear of the death penalty was an obstacle limiting Polish aid to Jews, but also antisemitism, which made many individuals uncertain of their neighbors' reaction to their attempts at rescue. Number of authors have noted the negative consequences of the hostility towards Jews by extremists advocating their eventual removal from Poland. Meanwhile, Alina Cala in her study of Jews in Polish folk culture argued also for the persistence of traditional religious antisemitism and anti-Jewish propaganda before and during the war both leading to indifference. Steinlauf however notes that despite these uncertainties, Jews were helped by countless thousands of individual Poles throughout the country. He writes that "not the informing or the indifference, but the existence of such individuals is one of the most remarkable features of Polish-Jewish relations during the Holocaust." Nechama Tec, who herself survived the war aided by a group of Catholic Poles, noted that Polish rescuers worked within an environment that was hostile to Jews and unfavorable to their protection, in which rescuers feared both the disapproval of their neighbors and reprisals that such disapproval might bring. Tec also noted that Jews, for many complex and practical reasons, were not always prepared to accept assistance that was available to them. Some Jews were pleasantly surprised to have been aided by people whom they thought to have expressed antisemitic attitudes before the invasion of Poland.

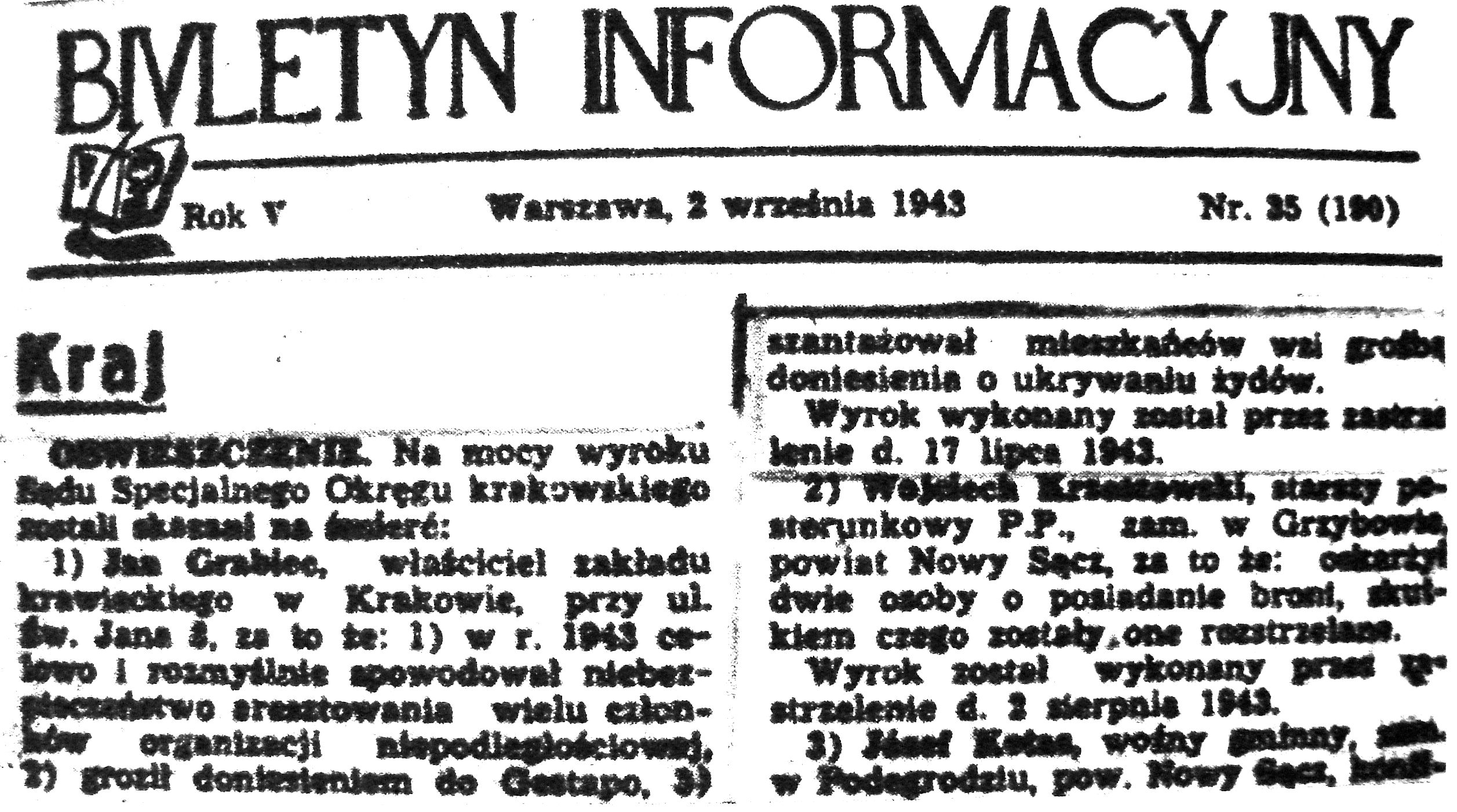
Underground Biuletyn Informacyjny announcing death sentence by Kedyw and the execution of named individuals who blackmailed Polish villagers hiding Jews, July 1943.

Former Director of the Department of the Righteous at Yad Vashem, Mordecai Paldiel, wrote that the widespread revulsion among the Polish people at the murders being committed by the Nazis was sometimes accompanied by an alleged feeling of relief at the disappearance of Jews. Israeli historian Joseph Kermish (born 1907) who left Poland in 1950, had claimed at the Yad Vashem conference in 1977, that the Polish researchers overstate the achievements of the Żegota organization (including members of Żegota themselves, along with venerable historians like Prof. Madajczyk), but his assertions are not supported by the listed evidence. Paulsson and Pawlikowski wrote that wartime attitudes among some of the populace were not a major factor impeding the survival of sheltered Jews, or the work of the Żegota organization.

The fact that the Polish Jewish community was destroyed during World War II, coupled with stories about Polish collaborators, has contributed, especially among Israelis and American Jews, to a lingering stereotype that the Polish population has been passive in regard to, or even supportive of, Jewish suffering. However, modern scholarship has not validated the claim that Polish antisemitism was irredeemable or different from contemporary Western antisemitism; it has also found that such claims are among the stereotypes that comprise anti-Polonism. The presenting of selective evidence in support of preconceived notions have led some popular press to draw overly simplistic and often misleading conclusions regarding the role played by Poles at the time of the Holocaust.

=== Punishment for aiding the Jews ===
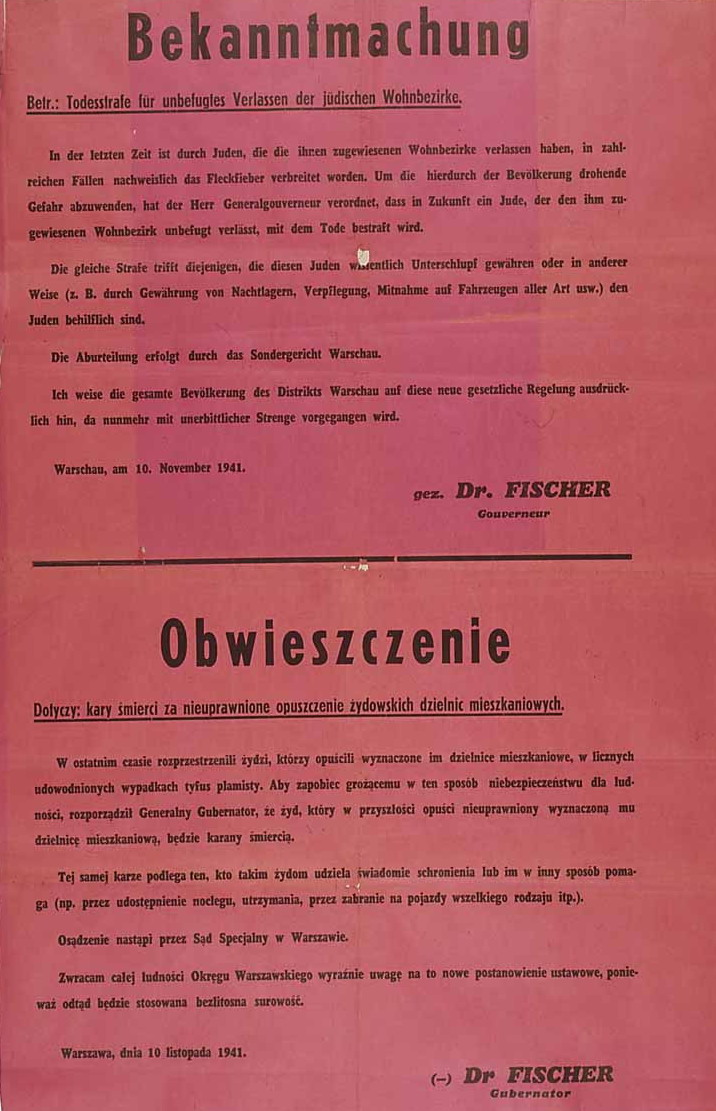
Announcement of death penalty for Jews captured outside the ghetto and for Poles helping Jews issued by the Governor of the Warsaw District – Dr Ludwig Fischer

In an attempt to discourage Poles from helping the Jews and to destroy any efforts of the resistance, the Germans applied a ruthless retaliation policy. On 15 October 1941, the death penalty was introduced by Hans Frank, governor of the General Government, to apply to Jews who attempted to leave the ghettos without proper authorization, and all those who "deliberately offer a hiding place to such Jews". The law was made public by posters distributed in all cities and towns, to instill fear. The death penalty was also imposed for helping Jews in Polish territories that became part of Reichskommisariat Ukraine and Reichskommisariat Ost, but without issuing any legal act. Similarly, in the territories incorporated directly into the German Reich, the death penalty for helping Jews was not introduced, but it was imposed locally during the liquidation of the ghettos.

Initially, the death penalty was imposed sporadically and only on Jews. Until the summer of 1942, Poles who helped them were fined or imprisoned. The situation changed during the liquidation of the ghettos, when the caught Jews were immediately killed, and the Poles who helped them were killed, sent to camps, punished with imprisonment or a fine, and sometimes released. There was no rule in punishing, and Poles who helped Jews were not sure whether the punishment would be only imprisonment or execution of them and their entire family, they had to assume the worst.

For example, the Ulma family (father, mother and six children) of the village of Markowa near Łańcut – where many families concealed their Jewish neighbors – were executed jointly by the Nazis with the eight Jews they hid. The entire Wołyniec family in Romaszkańce was massacred for sheltering three Jewish refugees from a ghetto. In Maciuńce, for hiding Jews, the Germans shot eight members of Józef Borowski's family along with him and four guests who happened to be there. Nazi death squads carried out mass executions of the entire villages that were discovered to be aiding Jews on a communal level.

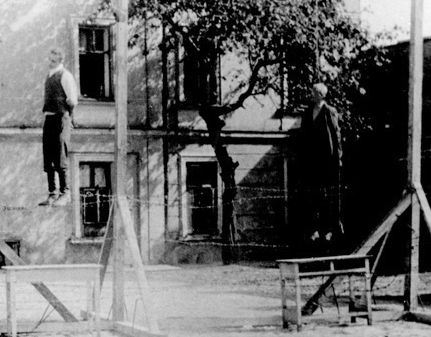
Public execution of Michał Kruk and several other ethnic Poles in Przemyśl as punishment for helping Jews, 1943

In November 1942, the Ukrainian Auxiliary Police executed 20 villagers from Berecz in Wołyń Voivodeship for giving aid to Jewish escapees from the ghetto in Povorsk. According to postwar investigations, 568 Poles and Ukrainians from the town Przemyśl and its environs were murdered for attempting to help Jews. For example, Michał Gierula from the village of Łodzinka Górna was hanged for offering shelter to three Jews and three partisans. In Przemyśl Michał Kruk and several other people in were executed on September 6, 1943 for the assistance they had rendered to the Jews. For helping Jews, Father Adam Sztark and the CSIC Maria Wołowska and Ewa Noiszewska were murdered on 19 December 1942 in a mass execution near Slonim. In Huta Stara near Buczacz, Polish Christians and the Jewish countrymen they protected were herded into a church by the Nazis and burned alive on 4 March 1944.

Entire communities that helped to shelter Jews were annihilated, such as the now-extinct village of Huta Werchobuska near Złoczów, Zahorze near Łachwa, Huta Pieniacka near Brody.

== Jews in Polish villages ==
A number of Polish villages in their entirety provided shelter from Nazi apprehension, offering protection for their Jewish neighbors as well as the aid for refugees from other villages and escapees from the ghettos. Postwar research has confirmed that communal protection occurred in Głuchów near Łańcut with everyone engaged, as well as in the villages of Główne, Ozorków, Borkowo near Sierpc, Dąbrowica near Ulanów, in Głupianka near Otwock, and Teresin near Chełm. In Cisie near Warsaw, 25 Poles were caught hiding Jews; all were killed and the village was burned to the ground as punishment.

The forms of protection varied from village to village. In Gołąbki, the farm of Jerzy and Irena Krępeć provided a hiding place for as many as 30 Jews; years after the war, the couple's son recalled in an interview with the Montreal Gazette that their actions were "an open secret in the village [that] everyone knew they had to keep quiet" and that the other villagers helped, "if only to provide a meal." Another farm couple, Alfreda and Bolesław Pietraszek, provided shelter for Jewish families consisting of 18 people in Ceranów near Sokołów Podlaski, and their neighbors brought food to those being rescued.

Two decades after the end of the war, a Jewish partisan named Gustaw Alef-Bolkowiak identified the following villages in the Parczew-Ostrów Lubelski area where "almost the entire population" assisted Jews: Rudka, Jedlanka, Makoszka, Tyśmienica, and Bójki. Historians have documented that a dozen villagers of Mętów near Głusk outside Lublin sheltered Polish Jews. In some well-confirmed cases, Polish Jews who were hidden, were circulated between homes in the village. Farmers in Zdziebórz near Wyszków sheltered two Jewish men by taking turns. Both of them later joined the Polish underground Home Army. The entire village of Mulawicze near Bielsk Podlaski took responsibility for the survival of an orphaned nine-year-old Jewish boy. Different families took turns hiding a Jewish girl at various homes in Wola Przybysławska near Lublin, and around Jabłoń near Parczew many Polish Jews successfully sought refuge.

Impoverished Polish Jews, unable to offer any money in return, were nonetheless provided with food, clothing, shelter and money by some small communities; historians have confirmed this took place in the villages of Czajków near Staszów as well as several villages near Łowicz, in Korzeniówka near Grójec, near Żyrardów, in Łaskarzew, and across Kielce Voivodship.

In tiny villages where there was no permanent Nazi military presence, such as Dąbrowa Rzeczycka, Kępa Rzeczycka and Wola Rzeczycka near Stalowa Wola, some Jews were able to openly participate in the lives of their communities. Olga Lilien, recalling her wartime experience in the 2000 book To Save a Life: Stories of Holocaust Rescue, was sheltered by a Polish family in a village near Tarnobrzeg, where she survived the war despite the posting of a 200 deutsche mark reward by the Nazi occupiers for information on Jews in hiding. Chava Grinberg-Brown from Gmina Wiskitki recalled in a postwar interview that some farmers used the threat of violence against a fellow villager who intimated the desire to betray her safety. Polish-born Israeli writer and Holocaust survivor Natan Gross, in his 2001 book Who Are You, Mr. Grymek?, told of a village near Warsaw where a local Nazi collaborator was forced to flee when it became known he reported the location of a hidden Jew.

Nonetheless, there were cases where Poles who saved Jews were met with a different response after the war. Antonina Wyrzykowska from Janczewko village near Jedwabne managed to successfully shelter seven Jews for twenty-six months from November 1942 until liberation. Sometime earlier, during the Jedwabne pogrom close by, a minimum of 300 Polish Jews were burned alive in a barn set on fire by a group of Polish men under the German command. Wyrzykowska was honored as Righteous Among the Nations for her heroism, but left her hometown after liberation for fear of retribution.

== Jews in Polish cities ==
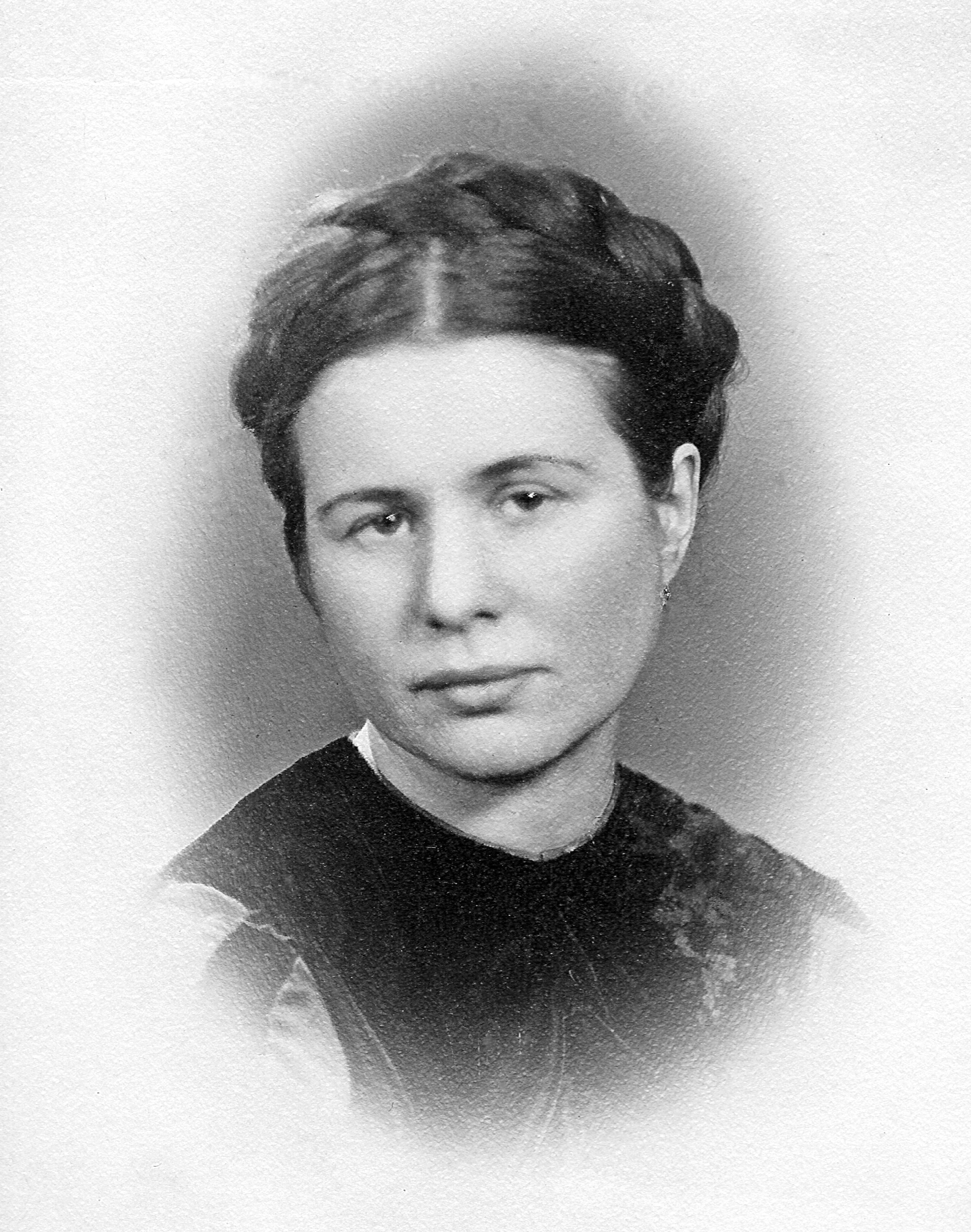
Irena Sendler smuggled 2,500 Jewish children out of the Warsaw Ghetto to safety.

In Poland's cities and larger towns, the Nazi occupiers created ghettos that were designed to imprison the local Jewish populations. The food rations allocated by the Germans to the ghettos condemned their inhabitants to starvation. Smuggling of food into the ghettos and smuggling of goods out of the ghettos, organized by Jews and Poles, was the only means of subsistence of the Jewish population in the ghettos. The price difference between the Aryan and Jewish sides was large, reaching as much as 100%, but the penalty for aiding Jews was death. Hundreds of Polish and Jewish smugglers would come in and out the ghettos, usually at night or at dawn, through openings in the walls, tunnels and sewers or through the guardposts by paying bribes.

The Polish Underground urged the Poles to support smuggling. The punishment for smuggling was death, carried out on the spot. Among the Jewish smuggler victims were scores of Jewish children aged five or six, whom the German shot at the ghetto exits and near the walls. While communal rescue was impossible under these circumstances, many Polish Christians concealed their Jewish neighbors. For example, Zofia Baniecka and her mother rescued over 50 Jews in their home between 1941 and 1944. Paulsson, in his research on the Jews of Warsaw, documented that Warsaw's Polish residents managed to support and conceal the same percentage of Jews as did residents in other European cities under Nazi occupation.

Ten percent of Warsaw's Polish population was actively engaged in sheltering their Jewish neighbors. It is estimated that the number of Jews living in hiding on the Aryan side of the capital city in 1944 was at least 15,000 to 30,000 and relied on the network of 50,000–60,000 Poles who provided shelter, and about half as many assisting in other ways.

== Jews outside Poland ==
Poles living in Lithuania supported Chiune Sugihara producing false Japanese visas. The refugees arriving to Japan were helped by Polish ambassador Tadeusz Romer. Henryk Sławik issued false Polish passports to about 5000 Jews in Hungary. He was killed by Germans in 1944.

=== Ładoś Group ===
The Ładoś Group also called the Bernese Group (Aleksander Ładoś, Konstanty Rokicki, Stefan Ryniewicz, Juliusz Kühl, Abraham Silberschein, Chaim Eiss) was a group of Polish diplomats and Jewish activists who elaborated in Switzerland a system of illegal production of Latin American passports aimed at saving European Jews from Holocaust. Ca 10.000 Jews received such passports, of which over 3000 have been saved. The group efforts are documented in the Eiss Archive.

== Organizations dedicated to saving Jews ==
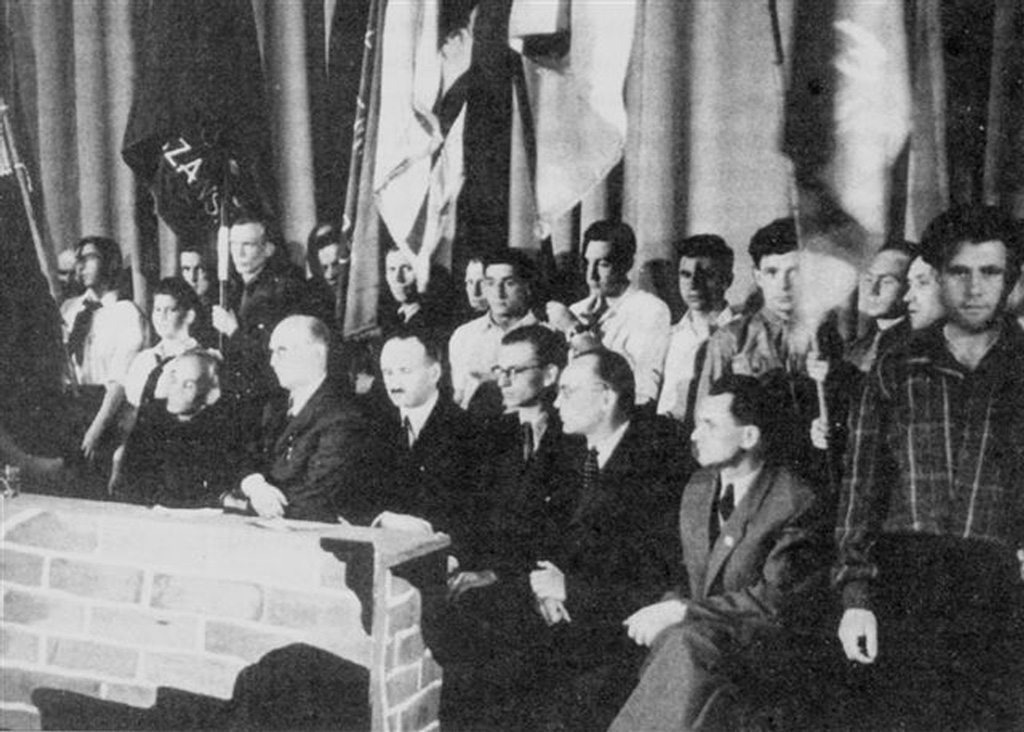
Żegota members at 3rd anniversary of Warsaw Ghetto Uprising, Poland

Several organizations dedicated to saving Jews were created and run by Christian Poles with the help of the Polish Jewish underground. Among those, Żegota, the Council to Aid Jews, was the most prominent. It was unique not only in Poland, but in all of Nazi-occupied Europe, as there was no other organization dedicated solely to that goal. Żegota concentrated its efforts on saving Jewish children toward whom the Germans were especially cruel. Tadeusz Piotrowski (1998) gives several wide-range estimates of a number of survivors including those who might have received assistance from Żegota in some form including financial, legal, medical, child care, and other help in times of trouble. The subject is shrouded in controversy according to Szymon Datner, but in Lukas' estimate about half of those who survived within the changing borders of Poland were helped by Żegota. The number of Jews receiving assistance who did not survive the Holocaust is not known.

Perhaps the most famous member of Żegota was Irena Sendler, who managed to successfully smuggle 2,500 Jewish children out of the Warsaw Ghetto. Żegota was granted over 5 million dollars or nearly 29 million zł by the government-in-exile (see below), for the relief payments to Jewish families in Poland. Besides Żegota, there were smaller organizations such as KZ-LNPŻ, ZSP, SOS and others (along the Polish Red Cross), whose action agendas included help to the Jews. Some were associated with Żegota.

== Jews and the Church ==
Mother Matylda Getter rescued between 250 and 550 Jewish children from the Warsaw Ghetto.

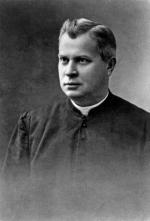
Polish priest Marceli Godlewski was recognized as Righteous among the Nations in 2009.

The Roman Catholic Church in Poland provided many persecuted Jews with food and shelter during the war, even though monasteries gave no immunity to Polish priests and monks against the death penalty. Nearly every Catholic institution in Poland looked after a few Jews, usually children with forged Christian birth certificates and an assumed or vague identity. In particular, convents of Catholic nuns in Poland (see Sister Bertranda), played a major role in the effort to rescue and shelter Polish Jews, with the Franciscan Sisters credited with the largest number of Jewish children saved. Two thirds of all nunneries in Poland took part in the rescue, in all likelihood with the support and encouragement of the church hierarchy. These efforts were supported by local Polish bishops and the Vatican itself. The convent leaders never disclosed the exact number of children saved in their institutions, and for security reasons the rescued children were never registered. Jewish institutions have no statistics that could clarify the matter. Systematic recording of testimonies did not begin until the early 1970s. In the villages of Ożarów, Ignaców, Szymanów, and Grodzisko near Leżajsk, the Jewish children were cared for by Catholic convents and by the surrounding communities. In these villages, Christian parents did not remove their children from schools where Jewish children were in attendance.

Irena Sendler head of children's section Żegota (the Council to Aid Jews) organisation cooperated very closely in saving Jewish children from the Warsaw Ghetto with social worker and Catholic nun, mother provincial of Franciscan Sisters of the Family of Mary - Matylda Getter. The children were placed with Polish families, the Warsaw orphanage of the Sisters of the Family of Mary, or Roman Catholic convents such as the Little Sister Servants of the Blessed Virgin Mary Conceived Immaculate at Turkowice and Chotomów. Sister Matylda Getter rescued between 250 and 550 Jewish children in different education and care facilities for children in Anin, Białołęka, Chotomów, Międzylesie, Płudy, Sejny, Vilnius and others. Getter's convent was located at the entrance to the Warsaw Ghetto. When the Nazis commenced the clearing of the ghetto in 1941, Getter took in many orphans and dispersed them among Family of Mary homes. As the Nazis began sending orphans to the gas chambers, Getter issued fake baptismal certificates, providing the children with false identities. The sisters lived in daily fear of the Germans. Michael Phayer credits Getter and the Family of Mary with rescuing more than 750 Jews.

Historians have shown that in numerous villages, Jewish families survived the Holocaust by living under assumed identities as Christians with full knowledge of the local inhabitants who did not betray their identities. This has been confirmed in the settlements of Bielsko (Upper Silesia), in Dziurków near Radom, in Olsztyn Village near Częstochowa, in Korzeniówka near Grójec, in Łaskarzew, Sobolew, and Wilga triangle, and in several villages near Łowicz.

Some officials in the senior Polish priesthood maintained the same theological attitude of hostility toward the Jews which was known from before the invasion of Poland. After the war ended, some convents were unwilling to return Jewish children to postwar institutions that asked for them, and at times refused to disclose the adoptive parents' identities, forcing government agencies and courts to intervene.

== Jews and the Polish government ==
The Mass Extermination of Jews in German Occupied Poland: the 1942 report by the Polish government-in-exile addressed to the wartime allies of the United Nations

Lack of international effort to aid Jews resulted in political uproar on the part of the Polish government-in-exile residing in Great Britain. The government often publicly expressed outrage at German mass murders of Jews. In 1942, the Directorate of Civil Resistance, part of the Polish Underground State, issued the following declaration based on reports by the Polish underground:

For nearly a year now, in addition to the tragedy of the Polish people, which is being slaughtered by the enemy, our country has been the scene of a terrible, planned massacre of the Jews. This mass murder has no parallel in the annals of mankind; compared to it, the most infamous atrocities known to history pale into insignificance. Unable to act against this situation, we, in the name of the entire Polish people, protest the crime being perpetrated against the Jews; all political and public organizations join in this protest.

The Polish government was the first to inform the Western Allies about the Holocaust, although early reports were often met with disbelief, even by Jewish leaders themselves, and then, for much longer, by Western powers.

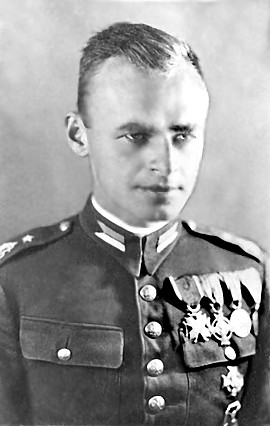
Witold Pilecki

Witold Pilecki was a member of the Polish Armia Krajowa (AK) resistance, and the only person who volunteered to be imprisoned in Auschwitz. As an agent of the underground intelligence, he began sending numerous reports about the camp and genocide to the Polish resistance headquarters in Warsaw through the resistance network he organized in Auschwitz. In March 1941, Pilecki's reports were being forwarded via the Polish resistance to the British government. These reports informed the Allies about the unfolding Holocaust and were the principal source of intelligence on Auschwitz for the Western Allies.

Similarly, in 1942, Jan Karski, who had been serving as a courier between the Polish underground and the Polish government in exile, was smuggled into the Warsaw Ghetto and reported to the Polish, British and American governments on the terrible situation of the Jews in Poland, in particular the destruction of the ghetto. He met with Polish politicians in exile, including the prime minister, as well as members of political parties such as the Polish Socialist Party, National Party, Labor Party, People's Party, Jewish Bund, and Poalei Zion. He also spoke to British Foreign Secretary Anthony Eden, and included a detailed statement on what he had seen in Warsaw and Bełżec.

In 1943 in London, Karski met the well-known journalist Arthur Koestler. He then traveled to the United States and reported to U.S. President Franklin D. Roosevelt. In July 1943, Jan Karski again personally reported to Roosevelt about the plight of Polish Jews, but the president "interrupted and asked the Polish emissary about the situation of... horses" in Poland. He also met with many other government and civic leaders in the United States, including Felix Frankfurter, Cordell Hull, William J. Donovan, and Stephen Wise. Karski also presented his report to the news media, bishops of various denominations (including Cardinal Samuel Stritch), members of the Hollywood film industry, and artists, but without success. Many of those he spoke to did not believe him and again supposed that his testimony was much exaggerated or was propaganda from the Polish government in exile.

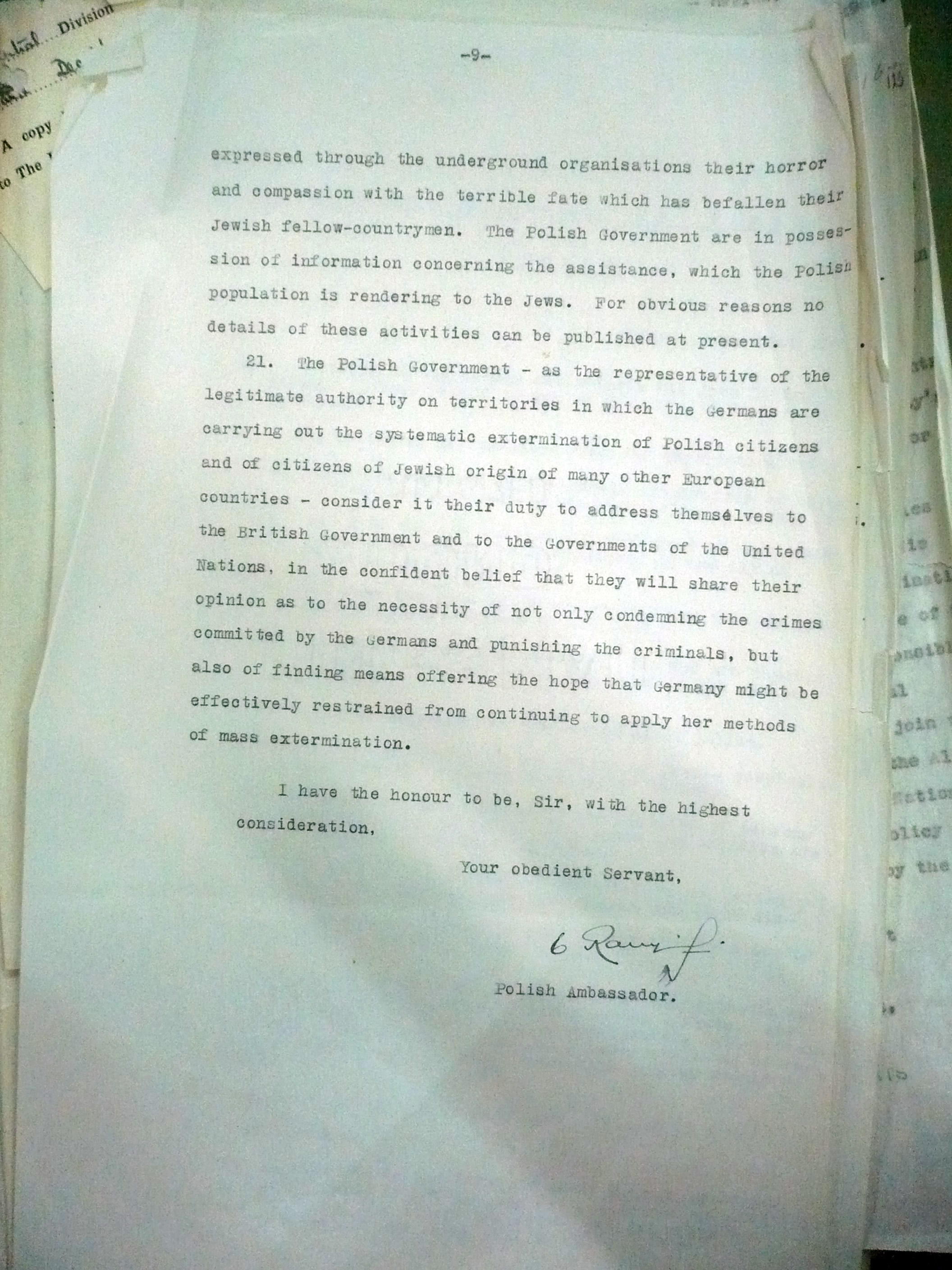
Last page "Raczyński's Note" - official note of Polish government-in-exile to Anthony Eden 10 December 1942.

The supreme political body of the underground government within Poland was the Delegatura. There were no Jewish representatives in it. Delegatura financed and sponsored Żegota, the organization for help to the Polish Jews – run jointly by Jews and non-Jews. Since 1942 Żegota was granted by Delegatura nearly 29 million zlotys (over $5 million; or, 13.56 times as much, in today's funds) for the relief payments to thousands of extended Jewish families in Poland. The Home Army also provided assistance including arms, explosives and other supplies to Jewish Combat Organization (ŻOB), particularly from 1942 onwards. The interim government transmitted messages to the West from the Jewish underground, and gave support to their requests for retaliation on German targets if the atrocities are not stopped – a request that was dismissed by the Allied governments. The Polish government also tried, without much success, to increase the chances of Polish refugees finding a safe haven in neutral countries and to prevent deportations of escaping Jews back to Nazi-occupied Poland.

Diplomat Henryk Sławik helped save Jews with false Polish passports.

Polish Delegate of the Government in Exile residing in Hungary, diplomat Henryk Sławik known as the Polish Wallenberg, helped rescue over 30,000 refugees including 5,000 Polish Jews in Budapest, by giving them false Polish passports as Christians. He founded an orphanage for Jewish children officially named School for Children of Polish Officers in Vác.

Polish Jews were represented, as the only minority, by two members on the National Council, a 20-30 member body that served as a quasi-parliament to the government in exile: Ignacy Schwarzbart and Szmul Zygielbojm. Also, in 1943 a Jewish affairs section of the Underground State was set up by the Government Delegation for Poland; it was headed by Witold Bieńkowski and Władysław Bartoszewski. Its purpose was to organize efforts concerning the Polish Jewish population, to coordinate with Żegota, and to prepare documentation about the fate of the Jews for the government in London. Regrettably, the great number of Polish Jews had been killed already even before the Government-in-exile fully realized the totality of the Final Solution. According to David Engel and Dariusz Stola, the government-in-exile concerned itself with the fate of Polish people in general, the re-recreation of the independent Polish state, and with establishing itself as an equal partner amongst the Allied forces. On top of its relative weakness, the government in exile was subject to the scrutiny of the West, in particular, American and British Jews reluctant to criticize their own governments for inaction in regard to saving their fellow Jews.

The Polish government and its underground representatives at home issued declarations that people acting against the Jews (blackmailers and others) would be punished by death. General Władysław Sikorski, the Prime Minister and Commander-in-Chief of the Polish Armed Forces, signed a decree calling upon the Polish population to extend aid to the persecuted Jews; including the following stern warning.

Any direct and indirect complicity in the German criminal actions is the most serious offence against Poland. Any Pole who collaborates in their acts of murder, whether by extortion, informing on Jews, or by exploiting their terrible plight or participating in acts of robbery, is committing a major crime against the laws of the Polish Republic.

— Warsaw, May 1943

According to Michael C. Steinlauf, before the Warsaw Ghetto Uprising in 1943, Sikorski's appeals to Poles to help Jews accompanied his communiques only on rare occasions. Steinlauf points out that in one speech made in London, he was promising equal rights for Jews after the war, but the promise was omitted from the printed version of the speech for no reason. According to David Engel, the loyalty of Polish Jews to Poland and Polish interests was held in doubt by some members of the exiled government, leading to political tensions. For example, the Jewish Agency refused to give support to Polish demand for the return of Lwów and Wilno to Poland. Overall, as Stola notes, Polish government was just as unprepared to deal with the Holocaust as were the other Allied governments, and that the government's hesitancy in appeals to the general population to aid the Jews diminished only after reports of the Holocaust became more wide spread.

Szmul Zygielbojm, a Jewish member of the National Council of the Polish government in exile, committed suicide in May 1943, in London, in protest against the indifference of the Allied governments toward the destruction of the Jewish people, and the failure of the Polish government to rouse public opinion commensurate with the scale of the tragedy befalling Polish Jews.

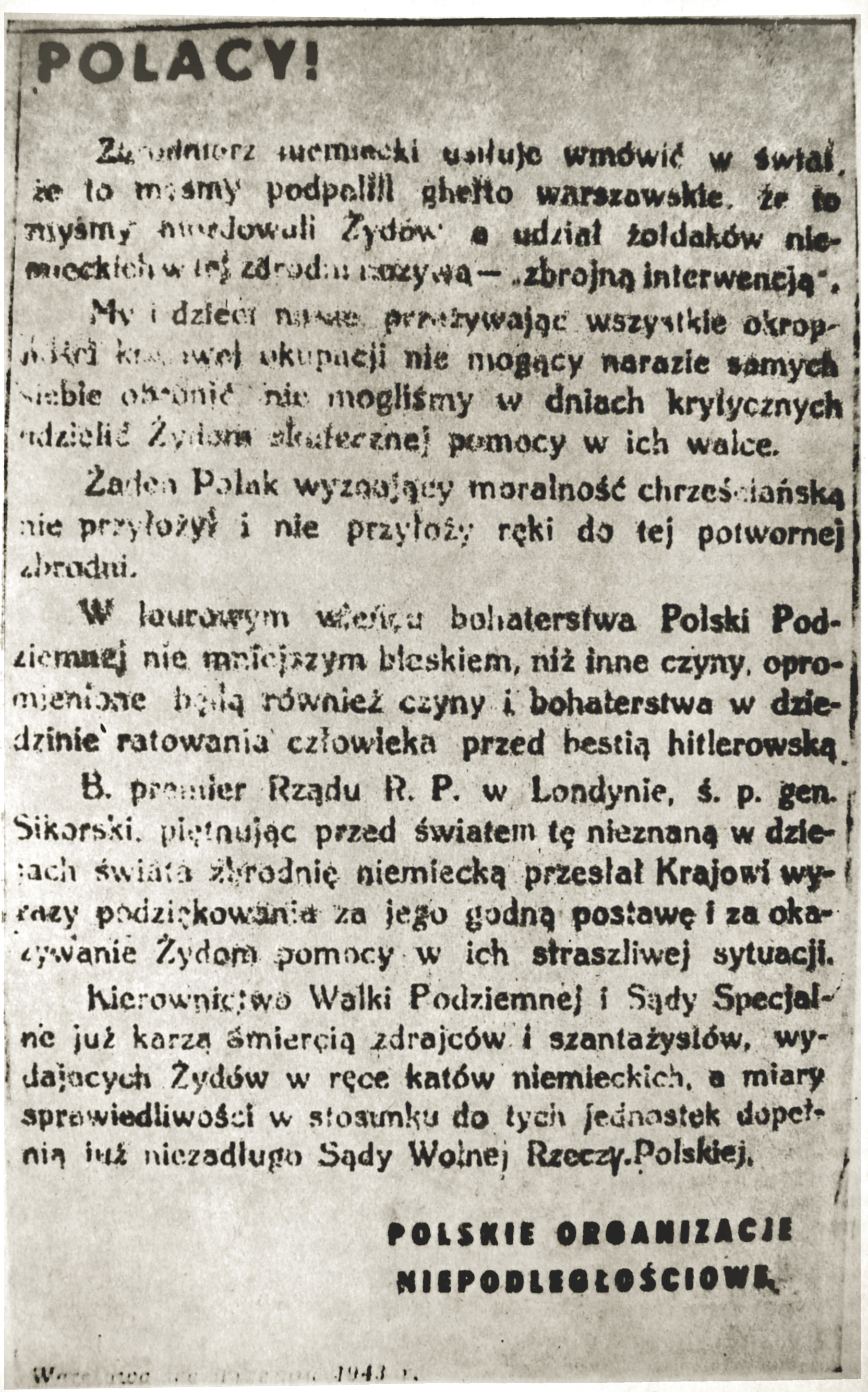
Clandestine poster warning of death penalty for blackmailing and turning in Jews, Żegota 1943.

Poland, with its unique underground state, was the only country in occupied Europe to have an extensive, underground justice system. These clandestine courts operated with attention to due process (although limited by circumstances), so it could take months to get a death sentence passed. However, Prekerowa notes that the death sentences by non-military courts only began to be issued in September 1943, which meant that blackmailers were able to operate for some time already since the first Nazi anti-Jewish measures of 1940. Overall, it took the Polish underground until late 1942 to legislate and organize non-military courts which were authorized to pass death sentences for civilian crimes, such as non-treasonous collaboration, extortion and blackmail. According to Joseph Kermish from Israel, among the thousands of collaborators sentenced to death by the underground courts and executed by the Polish resistance fighters who risked death carrying out these verdicts, few were explicitly blackmailers or informers who had persecuted Jews. This, according to Kermish, led to increasing boldness of some of the blackmailers in their criminal activities. Marek Jan Chodakiewicz writes that a number of Polish Jews were executed for denouncing other Jews. He notes that since Nazi informers often denounced members of the underground as well as Jews in hiding, the charge of collaboration was a general one and sentences passed were for cumulative crimes.

The Home Army units under the command of officers from left-wing Sanacja, the Polish Socialist Party as well as the centrist Democratic Party welcomed Jewish fighters to serve with Poles without problems stemming from their ethnic identity. (Note: As noted by Joshua D. Zimmerman, many negative stereotypes about the Home Army among the Jews came from reading postwar literature on the subject, and not from personal experience.) However, some rightist units of the Armia Krajowa excluded Jews. Similarly, some members of the Delegate's Bureau saw Jews and ethnic Poles as separate entities. Historian Israel Gutman has noted that AK leader Stefan Rowecki advocated the abandonment of the long-range considerations of the underground and the launch of an all-out uprising should the Germans undertake a campaign of extermination against ethnic Poles, but that no such plan existed while the extermination of Jewish Polish citizens was under way. On the other hand, the pre-war Polish government armed and trained Jewish paramilitary groups such as Lehi and – while in exile – accepted thousands of Polish Jewish fighters into Anders Army including leaders such as Menachem Begin. The policy of support continued throughout the war with the Jewish Combat Organization and the Jewish Military Union forming an integral part of the Polish resistance.

== See also ==
- List of individuals and groups assisting Jews during the Holocaust
- Rescue of Jews by Catholics during the Holocaust
- Kastner's Train of 1,684 Jews freed from Nazi-controlled Hungary
- Schindler's List biographical drama film about Oskar Schindler
- Ładoś Group that saved over 3,000 Jews

== Bibliography ==
- Cesarani, David; Kavanaugh, Sarah (2004). "Inside Nazi-dominated Europe". Holocaust: Critical Concepts in Historical Studies. Vol. V: Responses to the persecution and mass murder of the Jews. Psychology Press, Routledge. p. 64. ISBN 0415318718 – via Google Books, preview.
- Encyclopedia of Camps and Ghettos, 1933–1945. Vol. 2.
- Grądzka-Rejak, Martyna; Namysło, Aleksandra (2022). "Prawodawstwo niemieckie wobec Polaków i Żydów na terenie Generalnego Gubernatorstwa oraz ziem wcielonych do III Rzeszy. Analiza porównawcza" [German legislation towards Poles and Jews in the General Government and the lands incorporated into the Third Reich. Comparative analysis]. In Domański, Tomasz (ed.). Stan badań nad pomocą Żydom na ziemiach polskich pod okupacją niemiecką (in Polish). Warsaw: Institute of National Remembrance. ISBN 9788382294194. OCLC 1325606240.
- Friedrich, Klaus-Peter (2005). "Collaboration in a "Land without a Quisling": Patterns of Cooperation with the Nazi German Occupation Regime in Poland during World War II". Slavic Review. 64 (4): 711–746. doi:10.2307/3649910. ISSN 0037-6779. JSTOR 3649910. S2CID 163786298.
- Grabowski, Jan (2013). Hunt for the Jews: Betrayal and Murder in German-Occupied Poland. Bloomington: Indiana University Press. ISBN 9780253010742. OCLC 816563430.
- Grabowski, Jan (17 November 2016), The Polish Police Collaboration in the Holocaust (PDF), Ina Levine Annual Lecture, United States Holocaust Memorial Museum
- Gutman, Israel; Krakowski, Shmuel (1986). Unequal Victims: Poles and Jews during the Second World War. New York: Holocaust Publications.
- Kermish, Joseph (1977). "The Activities of the Council for Aid to Jews ("Żegota") in Occupied Poland" (PDF). Yad Vashem 1977 Conference Proceedings, Jerusalem. Shoah Resource Center. pp. 1–4, 14–17, 30–32. ASIN B00400ZEC0. Direct download, 139 KB.
- Lukas, Richard Conrad (1994). Did the Children Cry: Hitler's War Against Jewish and Polish Children, 1939–1945 (1st ed.). New York: Hippocrene. ISBN 9780781802420. OCLC 878669401.
- Lukas, Richard Conrad (2013). Forgotten Holocaust: The Poles under German Occupation, 1939–1944 (3rd revised ed.). New York: Hippocrene. ISBN 9780781809016. OCLC 868380881.
- Paldiel, Mordecai (1993). The Path of the Righteous: Gentile Rescuers of Jews during the Holocaust. New York: Ktav. ISBN 0-88125-376-6.
- Paulsson, Gunnar S. (20 April 2001). Roth, John K.; Maxwell, Elisabeth (eds.). Evading the Holocaust: The Unexplored Continent of Holocaust Historiography. Palgrave Macmillan. Three-Volume Set, p. 257. ISBN 0333804864. [Also in:] Age of Genocide (Houndmills, Basingstoke, Hampshire and New York: Palgrave, 2001), Volume 1, pp. 302–318.
- Paulsson, Gunnar Svante (2002). Secret City: The Hidden Jews of Warsaw, 1940–1945. Yale University Press. ISBN 9780300095463. OCLC 48965137.
- Paulsson, Gunnar S. (2003). Zimmerman, Joshua D. (ed.). Ringelblum Revisited: Polish-Jewish Relations in Occupied Warsaw, 1940–1945. New Brunswick, New Jersey and London: Rutgers University Press. pp. 173–192. ISBN 0813531586. No preview.
- Paulsson, Gunnar S. (2004). The Demography of Jews in Hiding in Warsaw, 1943–1945. Originally in Polin: Studies in Polish Jewry, volume 13 (2000), at pages 78–103; reprinted in: The Holocaust: Critical Concepts in Historical Studies. ISBN 041527513X.
- Rejak, Sebastian; Frister, Elżbieta (2012). Inferno of Choices: Poles and the Holocaust (PDF). RYTM, Warsaw 2011. ISBN 9788373995147. PDF file, direct download 1.64 MB.
- Pawlikowski, John T. (2003). "Polish Catholics and the Jews during the Holocaust". In Zimmerman, Joshua D. (ed.). Contested Memories: Poles and Jews During the Holocaust and Its Aftermath. Rutgers University Press. pp. 107–123. ISBN 0-8135-3158-6 – via Google Books.
- Piotrowski, Tadeusz (1998). "Assistance to Jews". Poland's Holocaust: Ethnic Strife, Collaboration with Occupying Forces and Genocide in the Second Republic, 1918–1947. Jefferson, N.C., London: McFarland & Company. pp. 112–128. ISBN 0786403713 – via Google Books.
- Tec, Nechama (1987). When Light Pierced the Darkness: Christian Rescue of Jews in Nazi-Occupied Poland. Oxford University Press. ISBN 0-19-505194-7 – via Internet Archive.
- Siekierka, Michał (2022). "Stan badań nad pomocą Żydom świadczoną przez ludność polską w okresie II wojny światowej na okupowanych terenach województwa tarnopolskiego" [The state of research on aid to Jews provided by the Polish population during World War II in the occupied territories of the Tarnopol Voivodeship]. In Domański, Tomasz (ed.). Stan badań nad pomocą Żydom na ziemiach polskich pod okupacją niemiecką (in Polish). Warsaw: Institute of National Remembrance. ISBN 9788382294194. OCLC 1325606240.
- Stola, Dariusz (2003). "The Polish government in exile and the Final Solution: What conditioned its actions and inactions?". In Zimmerman, Joshua D. (ed.). Contested Memories: Poles and Jews During the Holocaust and Its Aftermath. Rutgers University Press. pp. 107–123. ISBN 0-8135-3158-6 – via Google Books.
- Tec, Nechama (1986). When Light Pierced the Darkness: Christian Rescue of Jews in Nazi-Occupied Poland. Oxford University Press. ISBN 9780195051940.
- Tomaszewski, Irene; Werbowski, Tecia (1994). Zegota: The Rescue of Jews in Wartime Poland. Price-Patterson. ISBN 0-9695771-6-8.
- Zimmerman, Joshua D. (2015). The Polish Underground and the Jews, 1939-1945. Cambridge University Press. ISBN 978-1-316-31841-6. OCLC 910935082.
- Zimmerman, Joshua D. (2003). "Introduction: Changing Perceptions in the Historiography of Polish-Jewish Relations during the Second World War". In Zimmerman, Joshua D. (ed.). Contested Memories: Poles and Jews during the Holocaust and Its Aftermath. New Brunswick, New Jersey and London: Rutgers University Press. ISBN 0813531586.
