= Ignacy Kłopotowski =

Polish Roman Catholic priest

Blessed Ignacy Kłopotowski
- Born: 20 July 1866; Korzeniówka, Belsky Uyezd, Grodno Governorate
- Died: 7 September 1931 (aged 65); Warsaw, Second Polish Republic
- Venerated in: Roman Catholic Church
- Beatified: 19 June 2005, Pidluski Square, Warsaw, Poland by Cardinal Józef Glemp
- Feast: 7 September

Ignacy Kłopotowski (20 July 1866 – 7 September 1931) was a Polish Roman Catholic priest and the founder of the Sisters of the Blessed Virgin Mary of Loreto (1920); he founded this congregation with the assistance of the then-Apostolic Nuncio to Poland, Achille Ratti, the future Pope Pius XI. Kłopotowski served in Poland as a pastor towards those who were poor and orphaned. He is best known for his commitment to the Christian press in which he established a range of Christian publications for the faithful.

Cardinal Józef Glemp — on the behalf of Pope Benedict XVI — presided over the beatification on 19 June 2005 in Warsaw.

== Life ==
Ignacy Kłopotowski was born in Congress Poland on 26 July 1866 to his pious and patriotic parents Jan Kłopotowski and Isabella Dobrowolska. He received his baptism on the following 28 July.

He commenced his studies for the priesthood at the seminary in Lublin in 1883 and received his ordination as a priest on 5 July 1891 from Bishop Franciszek Jaczewski in the Lublin Cathedral. After four years of study for the priesthood he was sent to finish his studies in theology - which he graduated in - at Saint Petersburg in Russia. He was appointed as the parochial vicar of the "Conversion of Saint Paul" parish and was later made the chaplain to Saint Vincent's Hospital in 1892. It was at that same time he was made a professor at the major seminary of Saint Vincent's in which he taught sacred scripture and moral theology as well as canon law and catechism. He remained in that position until 1906.

Kłopotowski became the vicar of the Lublin Cathedral in 1892 and remained as such until 1894 when he was made the rector of the Greek Catholic Church of Saint Stanislaus. It was around this time that he founded a school for children and an employment center; both these facilities were established in Lublin. He founded a range of different orphanages and homes for elderly people while also founding a home for girls to escape prostitution.

He founded a series of rural schools - with the aid of the Congregation of the Handmaids of the Immaculate - but this brought him the persecution of the Russian authorities at the time. He began - as of 1905 - to publish a series of weekly and monthly newspapers known as "Polak-Katolik" (Polish-Catholic) despite not receiving Russian approval. However a decree a few years later by Tsar Nicholas II allowed him to continue to freely publish his works. Kłopotowski moved to Warsaw in 1908 with the permission of his superiors in order to increase the reach of his publications. In 1919 he was made the pastor of the parish of "Our Lady of Loreto" at Saint Florian's Church in the "Prague" district.

Kłopotowski established his own religious congregation - the Sisters of the Blessed Virgin Mary of Loreto - on 31 July 1920 with the aid and encouragement of the Apostolic Nuncio to Poland Achille Ratti - the future Pope Pius XI.

He died on 7 September 1931 and was interred at Powązki Cemetery. His remains were moved on 26 September 1932 to another cemetery and once again in 2000 into a chapel his institute ran. His religious congregation later became aggregated to the Order of Saint Benedict in 1940 and received the diocesan approval of Cardinal Stefan Wyszyński on 7 April 1949. The order received the papal approval of Pope Paul VI on 24 May 1971. As of 2008 there were 221 religious in a total of 24 houses of the institute.

== Beatification ==
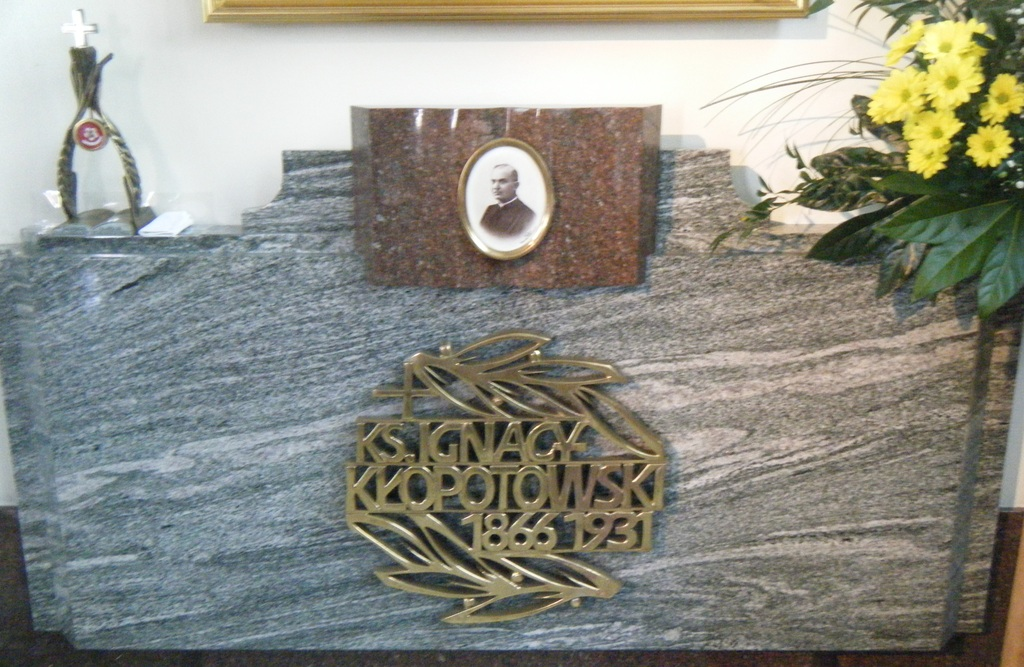
Tomb.

The beatification process commenced once the Congregation for the Causes of Saints (C.C.S.) granted the "nihil obstat" (nothing against) on 22 June 1988 in a simultaneous move that bestowed the title of Servant of God upon him. The diocesan process was then opened to evaluate his life and works and received the validation of the C.C.S. in Rome on 20 March 1993 after the closure of the process.

The Positio was submitted to the C.C.S. in 2000 which would allow for them to commence their own investigations into the cause. Theologians granted approval after deliberating on the contents of the dossier on 5 October 2004 while the C.C.S. also gave approval to it on 7 December 2004. The late priest was named Venerable on 20 December 2004 after Pope John Paul II confirmed that he had lived a life of heroic virtue.

The process for investigating an alleged miracle took place in Poland on 21 December 1995 and concluded not long after. The C.C.S. validated it on 9 April 1999 before passing it onto a medical board and theologians prior to the C.C.S. voting on the miracle. Pope Benedict XVI granted approval to it in 2005 and delegated Cardinal Józef Glemp to preside over the celebration in Warsaw on 19 June 2005.

The current postulator assigned to the cause is Marian Rola.
