= Battle of Błonie (1770) =

1770 battle of the War of the Bar Confederation

- Part of the War of the Bar Confederation
Date	12 February 1770
Location	Błonie, Polish–Lithuanian Commonwealth (now part of Poland)
Result	Russian victory

Belligerents
Bar Confederation	Tsardom of Russia

The Battle of Błonie, also known as the Battle of Zawady, was fought on 12 February 1770, during the War of the Bar Confederation, near the town of Błonie, near Warsaw. It was fought between forces of the Bar Confederation, and the Imperial Russian Army of the Tsardom of Russia. The Bar Confederates lost the battle against Russian forces, while heading towards Warsaw, from the Greater Poland. The defeat marked the end of major offensive operations of the Bar Confederation.
