= Płochocin railway station =

Railway station in Masovian Voivodeship, Poland

Płochocin
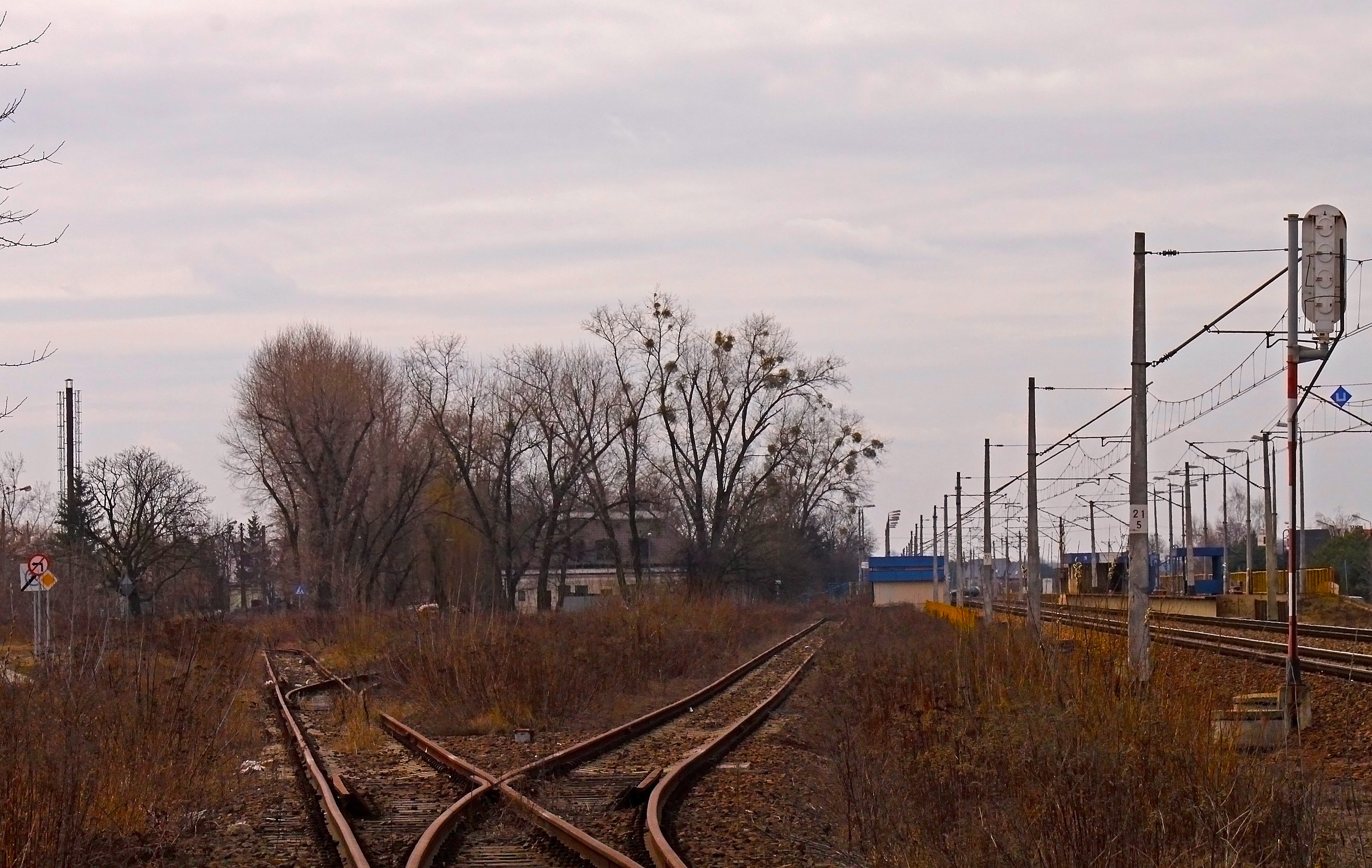
- Płochocin railway.jpg

General information
- Location: Płochocin, Masovian; Poland
- Coordinates: 52°12′00″N 20°42′10″E
- Owner: Polskie Koleje Państwowe S.A.
- Platforms: 2
- Tracks: 2

History
- Opened: 1902
- Former names: Plochocin

Services
Preceding station	Masovian Railways	Following station
Błonie towards Kutno	R3	Ożarów Mazowiecki towards Warszawa Wschodnia or Warszawa Główna
Location

Płochocin railway station is a railway station in Płochocin, Poland. The station is served by Masovian Railways, who run trains from Kutno to Warszawa Wschodnia.
