= Wilczopole =

- Village
- Location within Poland
- Coordinates: 51°10′N 22°39′E
- Country: Poland
- Voivodeship: Lublin
- County: Lublin
- Gmina: Głusk

Wilczopole [vilt͡ʂɔˈpɔlɛ] is a village in the administrative district of Gmina Głusk, within Lublin County, Lublin Voivodeship, in eastern Poland.
