= Ożarów Mazowiecki railway station =

Railway station in Ożarów Mazowiecki, Poland

Ożarów Mazowiecki
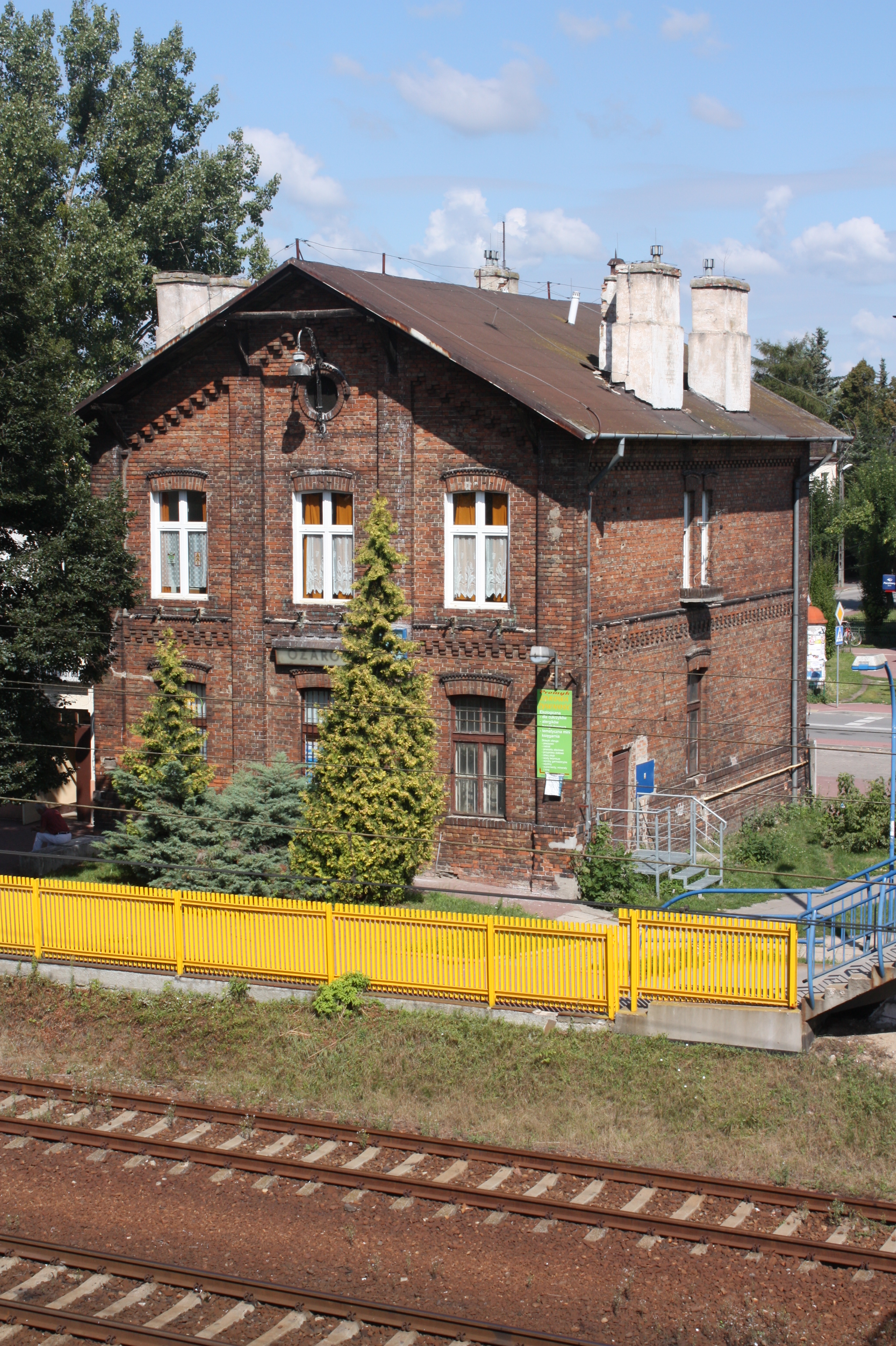

General information
- Location: Ożarów Mazowiecki, Masovian; Poland
- Coordinates: 52°12′26″N 20°47′49″E
- Owner: Polskie Koleje Państwowe S.A.
- Platforms: 2
- Tracks: 4

History
- Former names: Ozarow b. Warschau; Ożarów-Franciszków

Services
Preceding station	Masovian Railways	Following station
Płochocin towards Kutno	R3	Warszawa Gołąbki towards Warszawa Wschodnia or Warszawa Główna
Location

Ożarów Mazowiecki railway station is a railway station in Ożarów Mazowiecki, Poland. The station is served by Masovian Railways, who run trains from Kutno to Warszawa Wschodnia.
