= Mętów =

- Village
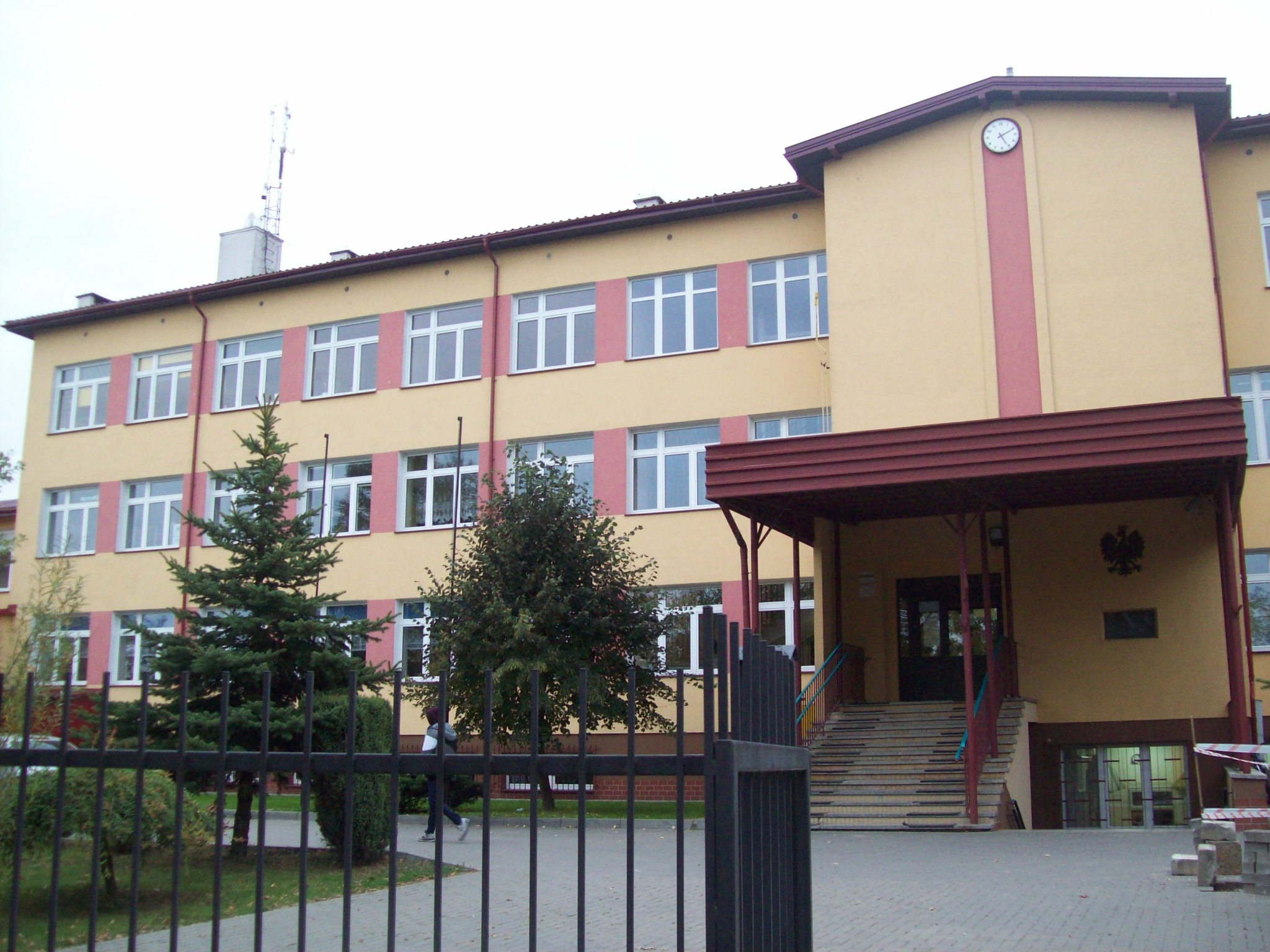
- School in Mętów

- Location within Poland
- Coordinates: 51°8′52″N 22°35′43″E
- Country: Poland
- Voivodeship: Lublin
- County: Lublin
- Gmina: Głusk

Population
  - Total: 890
- Time zone: UTC+1 (CET)
  - Summer (DST): UTC+2 (CEST)
- Vehicle registration: LUB

Mętów [ˈmɛntuf] is a village in the administrative district of Gmina Głusk, within Lublin County, Lublin Voivodeship, in eastern Poland.

== History ==
In 1827 Mętów had a population of 213.

Following the joint German-Soviet invasion of Poland, which started World War II in September 1939, the village was occupied by Germany. In October 1943, the German gendarmerie executed two local Poles for providing food for Jews hiding in the nearby forest (see Rescue of Jews by Poles during the Holocaust).
