= Prawiedniki-Kolonia =

- Village
- Location within Poland
- Coordinates: 51°08′24″N 22°32′30″E
- Country: Poland
- Voivodeship: Lublin
- County: Lublin
- Gmina: Głusk

Prawiedniki-Kolonia [pravjɛdˈniki kɔˈlɔɲa] is a village in the administrative district of Gmina Głusk, within Lublin County, Lublin Voivodeship, in eastern Poland.
