= Prawiedniki =

- Village
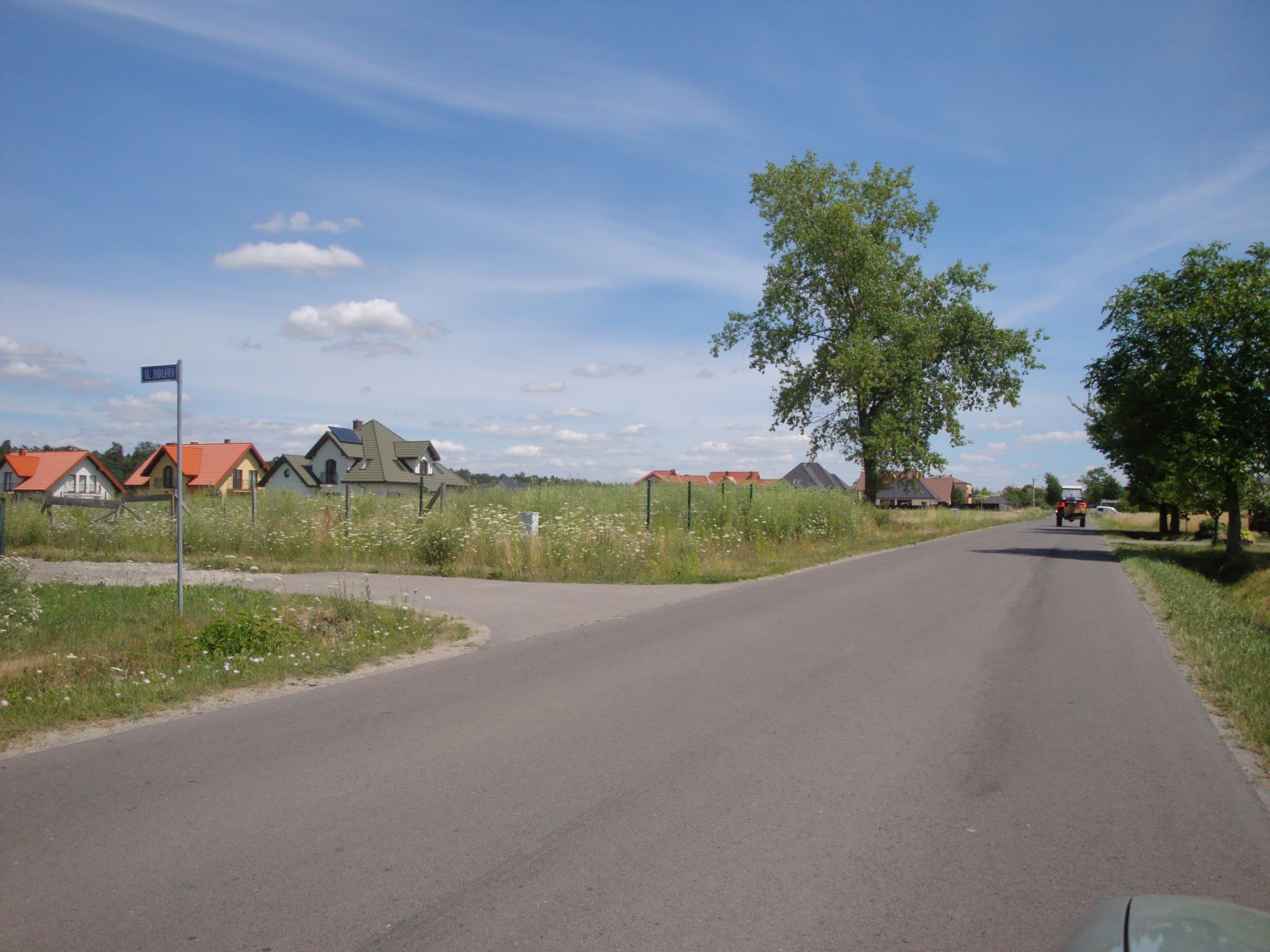

- Location within Poland
- Coordinates: 51°9′N 22°30′E
- Country: Poland
- Voivodeship: Lublin
- County: Lublin
- Gmina: Głusk
- Time zone: UTC+1 (CET)
  - Summer (DST): UTC+2 (CEST)

Prawiedniki [pravjɛdˈniki] is a village in the administrative district of Gmina Głusk, within Lublin County, Lublin Voivodeship, in eastern Poland.

== History ==
Four Polish citizens were murdered by Nazi Germany in the village during World War II.
