= Zofia Baniecka =

Polish resistance member (1917–1993)

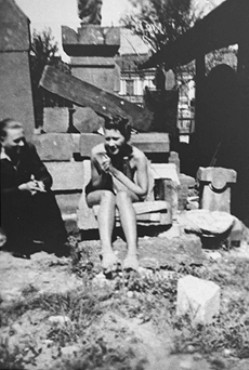
- Zofia Baniecka, 1939
- Born: May 12, 1917; Warsaw
- Died: June 2, 1993 (aged 76); Warsaw
- Resting place: Powązki Cemetery

Zofia Baniecka (12 May 1917 in Warsaw – 1993) was a Polish member of the Resistance during World War II. In addition to relaying guns and other materials to resistance fighters, Baniecka and her mother sheltered over 50 Jews in their home between 1941 and 1944. Later, Baniecka was an activist with the Intervention Bureau of the Polish Workers' Defence Committee (Polish: Komitet Obrony Robotników, KOR) in 1977. She and her husband were active participants in the Solidarity movement in the 1980s, distributing underground press. In her professional capacity, Baniecka was a long-time member of the Warsaw chapter of the Association of Polish Artists and Designers (ZPAP).

== Life ==
Born fifteen years after her parents' wedding, Zofia Baniecka was the only child of a sculptor father and a teacher mother from Warsaw. Her parents were not religious but she went to a Catholic school. She then studied at the Warsaw University, before the Nazi German and Soviet invasion of Poland. Zofia had many Jewish friends from assimilated homes just like her own intellectually inclined parents. In late 1940 the Nazi occupiers ordered the family to relocate when their home fell within the boundaries of the newly established Warsaw Ghetto.

All three family members began to work for the Polish underground. In Zofia's case, she became affiliated with the Bataliony Chłopskie. Zofia's inconspicuous grey-haired mother was transporting weapons in her shopping bag for the Resistance, while Zofia's father smuggled food and books to friends in the Ghetto. Thanks to help from their underground contacts, the family soon moved to a large apartment with four rooms and a kitchen — near the walls of the ghetto — and began taking in Jewish refugees. The apartment was divided by curtains with a different Jewish family behind each one. Nobody was ever refused: friends, strangers, acquaintances. Zofia got involved with the underground press and also, helped the Jewish Committee find hiding places for the children. As a courier, she distributed underground newspapers and relayed orders around the General Government.

Even though in 1941 Zofia's father was killed in a Soviet air-strike on Warsaw — from winter of 1941 till August 1944 (when the Warsaw Uprising started) — the two women managed to rescue at least fifty (50) Jews in their home, including a family of ten, escaping the Ghetto firestorm in April 1943 following the failed Ghetto Uprising. When their house was full, the Banieckis helped Jews find other places to hide.

After the Soviet takeover of Poland at the end of World War II, Zofia was arrested by the Communist authorities as a member of Resistance but she was ultimately released. She got married. Years later, with her husband, Baniecka got involved with the anti-communist Komitet Obrony Robotników (KOR), undeterred by the threat of repressions. Ultimately, she also became an active participant in the Polish Solidarity movement of the 1980s.

== Remembrance ==
She was recognized as a Righteous Among the Nations, posthumously, in 2016.

== See also ==
- Shoah
- Rescue of Jews by Poles during the Holocaust
- Żegota, the Polish Council to Aid Jews

== Further references ==
- Gay Block, and Malka Drucker, Rescuers: Portraits of Moral Courage in the Holocaust. Holmes & Meier, New York, 1992, pp. 163–4. Content available at USHMM website's time sensitive page #1, and #2
- Michael Harrington, Find A Grave: Zofia Baniecka
- Rochelle L. Millen, Jack Mann, Timothy Bennett, New Perspectives on the Holocaust Publisher NYU Press 1996, ISBN 0-8147-5540-2
