= Kliny, Lublin Voivodeship =

Kliny
- Village
- Location within Poland
- Coordinates: 51°11′N 22°41′E
- Country: Poland
- Voivodeship: Lublin
- County: Lublin
- Gmina: Głusk
- Time zone: UTC+1 (CET)
  - Summer (DST): UTC+2 (CEST)

Kliny [ˈklinɨ] is a village in the administrative district of Gmina Głusk, within Lublin County, Lublin Voivodeship, in eastern Poland.

== History ==
12 Polish citizens were murdered by Nazi Germany in the village during World War II.
