= Coreno Ausonio =

- Comune
- Comune di Coreno Ausonio
- Location within Italy Location within Lazio
- Coordinates: 41°21′N 13°47′E
- Country: Italy
- Region: Lazio
- Province: Frosinone (FR)

Government
  - Mayor: Domenico Corte

Area
  - Total: 26.38 km^{2} (10.19 sq mi)
- Elevation: 318 m (1,043 ft)

Population (28 February 2017)
  - Total: 1,624
  - Density: 61.56/km^{2} (159.4/sq mi)
- Demonym: Corenesi
- Time zone: UTC+1 (CET)
  - Summer (DST): UTC+2 (CEST)
- Postal code: 03040
- Dialing code: 0776
- Patron saint: St. Margaret
- Saint day: 20 July
- Website: Official website

Coreno Ausonio is a comune (municipality) in the Province of Frosinone in the Italian region Lazio, located about 120 kilometres (75 mi) southeast of Rome and about 50 kilometres (31 mi) southeast of Frosinone at the foot of Monte Maio, in the Monti Aurunci.

It includes an ancient carved grotto, the Grotta delle Fate ("Fairies' Grotto", 8th century BC), likely a tomb of one of the Osco-Sabellian tribes that lived here at the time.

== Twin towns ==
- Błonie, Poland
