= Ćmiłów =

- Village
- Location within Poland
- Coordinates: 51°10′N 22°35′E
- Country: Poland
- Voivodeship: Lublin
- County: Lublin
- Gmina: Głusk

Ćmiłów [ˈt͡ɕmiwuf] is a village in the administrative district of Gmina Głusk, within Lublin County, Lublin Voivodeship, in eastern Poland.
