= Wilczopole-Kolonia =

- Village
- Location within Poland
- Coordinates: 51°10′02″N 22°38′47″E
- Country: Poland
- Voivodeship: Lublin
- County: Lublin
- Gmina: Głusk

Wilczopole-Kolonia [vilt͡ʂɔˈpɔlɛ kɔˈlɔɲa] is a village in the administrative district of Gmina Głusk, within Lublin County, Lublin Voivodeship, in eastern Poland.
