= Kalinówka, Lublin County =

Kalinówka
- Village
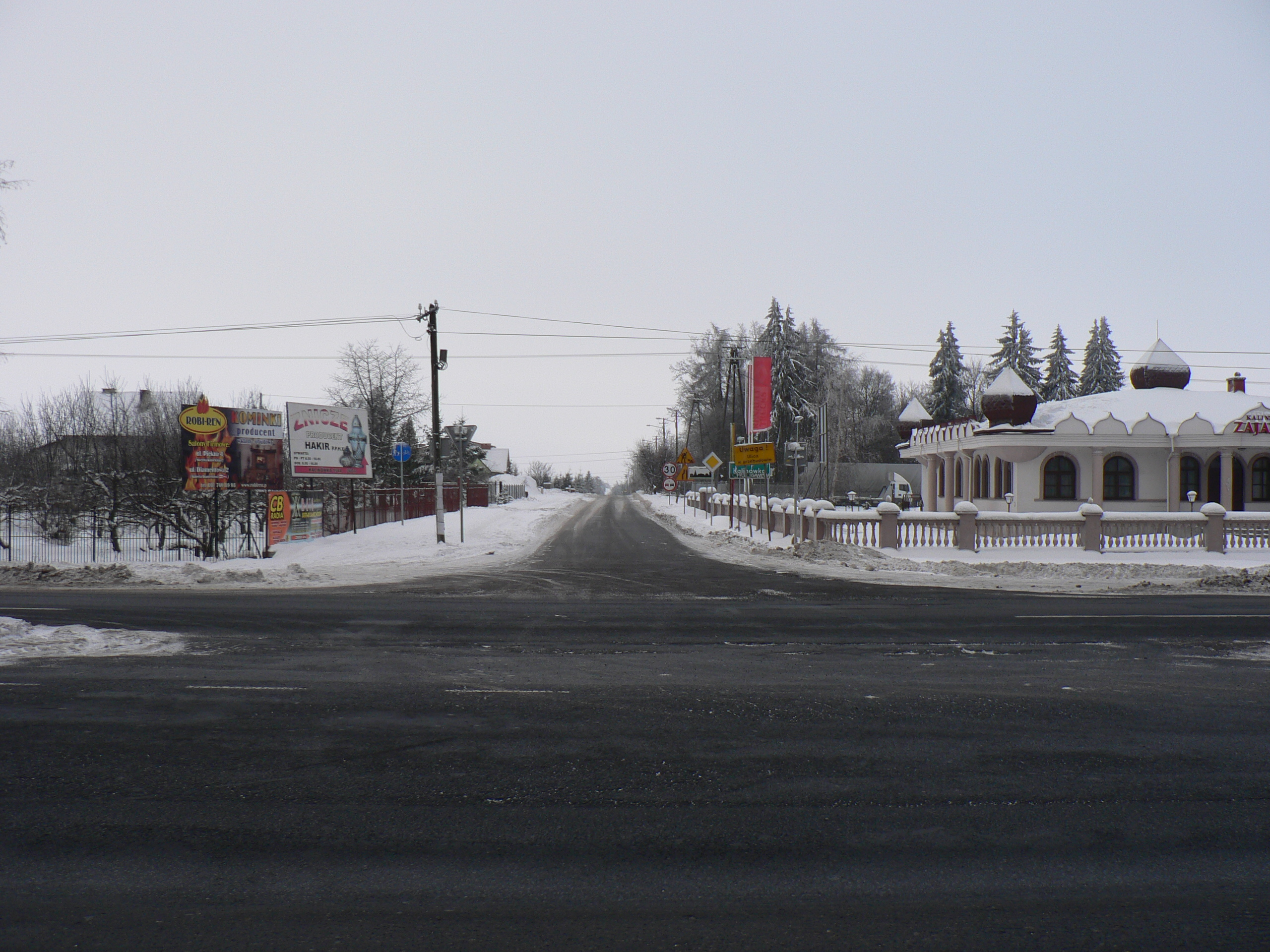
- Kalinowka during winter

- Location within Poland
- Coordinates: 51°12′15″N 22°39′34″E
- Country: Poland
- Voivodeship: Lublin
- County: Lublin
- Gmina: Głusk

Kalinówka [kaliˈnufka] is a village in the administrative district of Gmina Głusk, within Lublin County, Lublin Voivodeship, in eastern Poland.
