= Abramowice Prywatne =

- Village
- Location within Poland
- Coordinates: 51°12′20″N 22°36′50″E
- Country: Poland
- Voivodeship: Lublin
- County: Lublin
- Gmina: Głusk

Population
  - Total: 350

Abramowice Prywatne [abramɔˈvit͡sɛ prɨˈvatnɛ] is a village in the administrative district of Gmina Głusk, within Lublin County, Lublin Voivodeship, in eastern Poland.
