= Majdan Mętowski =

- Village
- Location within Poland
- Coordinates: 51°8′48″N 22°40′28″E
- Country: Poland
- Voivodeship: Lublin
- County: Lublin
- Gmina: Głusk

Population
  - Total: 124

Majdan Mętowski (Polish pronunciation: [ˈmajdan mɛnˈtɔfskʲi]) is a village in the administrative district of Gmina Głusk, within Lublin County, Lublin Voivodeship, in eastern Poland.
