= Dominów, Lublin County =

Dominów
- Village
- Location within Poland
- Coordinates: 51°10′53″N 22°26′4″E
- Country: Poland
- Voivodeship: Lublin
- County: Lublin
- Gmina: Głusk

Dominów [dɔˈminuf] is a village in the administrative district of Gmina Głusk, within Lublin County, Lublin Voivodeship, in eastern Poland.
