= Błonie railway station =

Railway station in Błonie, Poland

Błonie
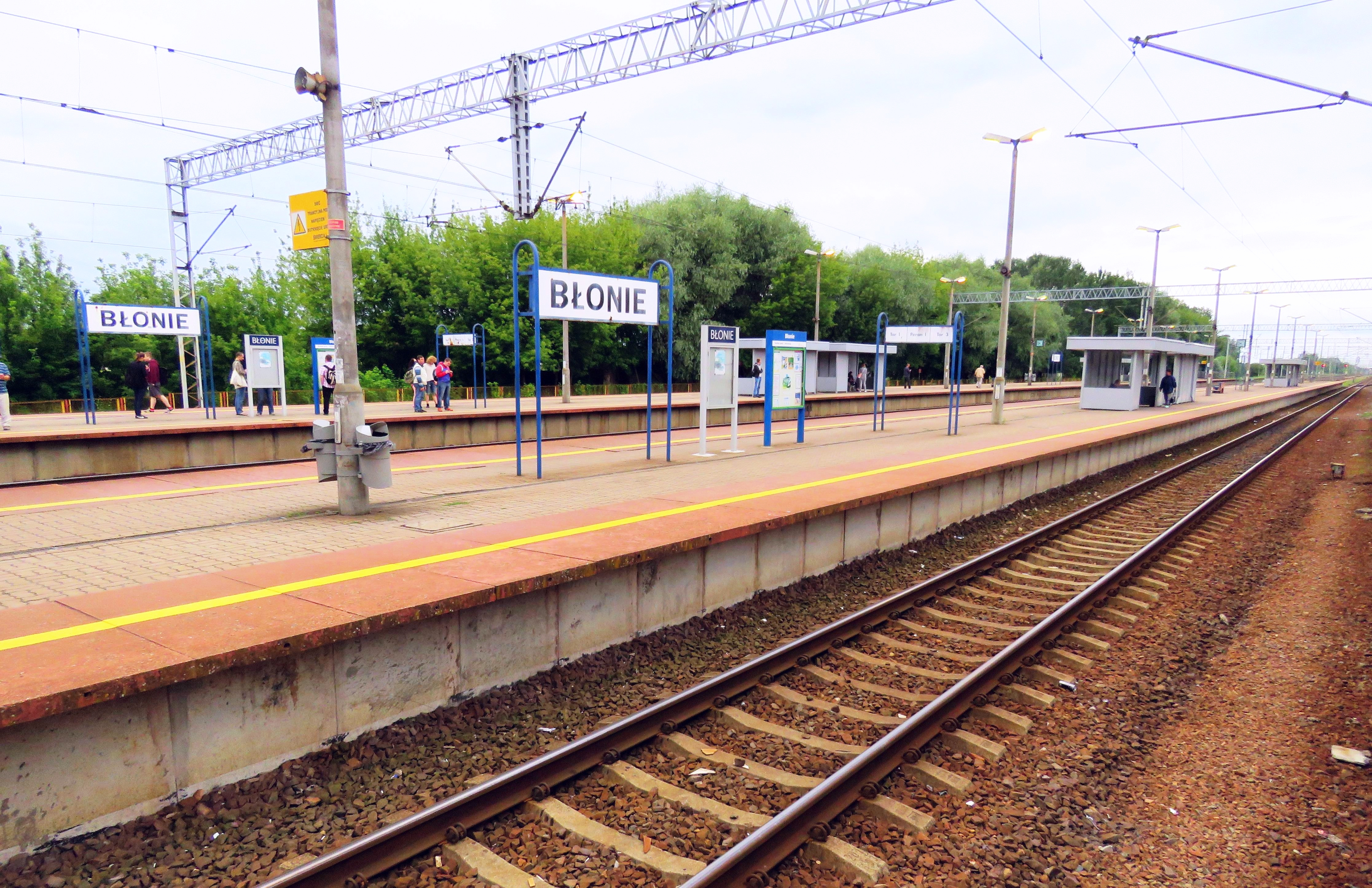

General information
- Location: Błonie, Masovian Voivodeship; Poland
- Coordinates: 52°11′11″N 20°36′36″E
- Owner: Polish State Railways
- Platforms: 2
- Tracks: 4

History
- Opened: 1902

Services
Preceding station	Masovian Railways	Following station
Witanów towards Kutno	R3	Płochocin towards Warszawa Wschodnia or Warszawa Główna
Location

Błonie is a railway station in Błonie, in central Poland. The station is served by Masovian Railways, who run trains from Kutno to Warszawa Wschodnia.
