= Głuszczyzna =

- Village
- Location within Poland
- Coordinates: 51°9′N 22°36′E
- Country: Poland
- Voivodeship: Lublin
- County: Lublin
- Gmina: Głusk

Głuszczyzna [ɡwuʂˈt͡ʂɨzna] is a village in the administrative district of Gmina Głusk, within Lublin County, Lublin Voivodeship, in eastern Poland.

The Czerniowka rivers flows through Głuszczyzna. There is a bus terminal of the city of Lublin in Głuszczyzna.
