= Kazimierzówka =

- Village
- Location within Poland
- Coordinates: 51°11′12″N 22°40′47″E
- Country: Poland
- Voivodeship: Lublin
- County: Lublin
- Gmina: Głusk

Kazimierzówka [kaʑimjɛˈʐufka] is a village in the administrative district of Gmina Głusk, within Lublin County, Lublin Voivodeship, in eastern Poland.
