= Nowiny, Lublin County =

Nowiny
- Village
- Location within Poland
- Coordinates: 51°8′25″N 22°29′40″E
- Country: Poland
- Voivodeship: Lublin
- County: Lublin
- Gmina: Głusk

Population
  - Total: 172

Nowiny [nɔˈvinɨ] is a village in the administrative district of Gmina Głusk, within Lublin County, Lublin Voivodeship, in eastern Poland.
