= Jerzy and Irena Krępeć =

Jerzy and Irena Krępeć, a Polish husband and wife, living in Gołąbki near Warsaw during Nazi German occupation of Poland in World War II, were the Righteous who rescued Polish Jews with families including refugees from the Ghetto in Warsaw during the Holocaust.

== The ceremonies ==
Jerzy and Irena Krępeć were bestowed the titles of Righteous among the Nations by Yad Vashem on April 18, 1994. Their medals of honor were presented to a widowed Irena Krępeć by the Israeli Consul General in Canada Daniel Gal, during the ceremony at the Israeli consulate in Montreal, on December 12, 1995 in the presence of the Polish Consul General Małgorzata Dzieduszycki, and the French and English press.

Daniel Gal explained in his speech that the Holocaust survivors pleaded on behalf of the entire Krępeć family with all its members and that Yad Vashem honored Jerzy and Irena first. Subsequently, their son, Tadeusz living in Montreal, and Jerzy’s two sisters, Eugenia Krępeć–Muszyński and Alina (Halina) Krępeć–Tyszka, were recognized as Righteous in May and November 2002, with more testimonies by their Jewish countrymen. The ceremony was written about in 12 newspaper articles in three languages. "My father never sought recognition or compensation for what he did," said André Krepec — the eldest son of Tadeusz Krepec — who attended the forum together with his widowed mother Halina, three brothers, sister, and their families. "For him, it was just a question of human values…"

== The rescuers and the rescued ==
Following the 1939 invasion of Poland, Jerzy Krępeć (1896–1981) and Irena née Adamus (1906–17.11.1999), were forced out by the Nazis from their estate near Płock. They moved to Gołąbki near Warsaw with their three children: Tadeusz (14), Krystyna (13) and Maria (9), and rented a farm called Osada not far from where Irena’s parents lived. Soon they began to take in Jews who escaped from Nazi persecution. Among them: Krystyna Izbicki, Anna Zofia and her son Jozef Ettinger, Krystyna Radziejewski and her foster-daughter Larissa Sztorchan, Czeslawa Konko (children's instructor), Zofia Sidor, her sisters, Eliza Temler and Dr. Tworkowski. More than 20 Jewish refugees joined in after the Warsaw Uprising. They all worked at the farm and in the fields to maintain food supplies and also, for their own cover. Children, both Christian and Jewish, attended classes at an underground school set up by the family.

Jerzy Krępeć rented a second farm nearby where he placed his two sisters: Alina Tyszka (with daughters, Marta and Stefa) and Eugenia Muszynski with her teenage daughter Olenka (14). Alina Tyszka was expelled from her estate near Bydgoszcz (which was incorporated into Nazi Germany). Her husband Feliks, a Polish officer, was executed by the Nazis with his two uncles. Alina escaped when threatened with arrest, because of her earlier assistance given to Jews at a forced labor camp in Bielin where she worked in 1941. Eugenia's husband was held as a Polish POW in Germany. The two sisters immediately began sheltering more Jews. They all worked together at the farm. Their older children, especially Tadeusz and Olenka helped. The Jews moved from one farm to the other in case of danger. Some received false identification cards thanks to Jerzy's underground contacts, which was good also for their morale.

The entire Krepec family helped everybody in need with shelter, food, clothing and moral support. People in the village knew about the numerous Jewish families living at both farms, but nobody betrayed them and all refugees survived. Indeed, Jerzy Krepec had many silent partners, including neighbors well aware of the succession of farmhands speaking Polish with an accent. Undeterred by the associated risk, Tadeusz Krepec used to sneak out at night and steal guns and grenades from the German Panzer division stationed nearby, then bury them at the farm for the Polish Underground.

After the war, the Krepec family kept in touch with the Jewish friends who had stayed with them during the occupation. They were receiving shipments of oranges from Israel; however, they would not accept the offer to help emigrate from their homeland. Their son, Tadeusz Krepec, who studied at the Warsaw Polytechnic eventually moved to Montreal in 1973 as an engineer.

== See also ==
- Rescue of Jews by Poles during the Holocaust

== Notes and references ==
- Peggy Curran, "Decent people: Polish couple honored for saving Jews from Nazis," Montreal Gazette, December 10, 1994. See also: Montreal Gazette, August 5, 2003.
- Janice Arnold, "Polish widow made Righteous Gentile," The Canadian Jewish News (Montreal edition), January 26, 1995.
- Irene Tomaszewski and Tecia Werbowski, Żegota: The Council for Aid to Jews in Occupied Poland, 1942–1945, Montreal: Price-Patterson, 1999, pp. 131–32.
