= Żabia Wola, Gmina Głusk =

Żabia Wola
- Village
- Location within Poland
- Coordinates: 51°09′51″N 22°35′17″E
- Country: Poland
- Voivodeship: Lublin
- County: Lublin
- Gmina: Głusk

Population
  - Total: 190
- Time zone: UTC+1 (CET)
  - Summer (DST): UTC+2 (CEST)

Żabia Wola [ˈʐabja ˈvɔla] is a village in the administrative district of Gmina Głusk, within Lublin County, Lublin Voivodeship, in eastern Poland.

== History ==
Six Polish citizens were murdered by Nazi Germany in the village during World War II.
