= Warszawa Gołąbki railway station =

Railway station in Warsaw, Poland

Warszawa Gołąbki
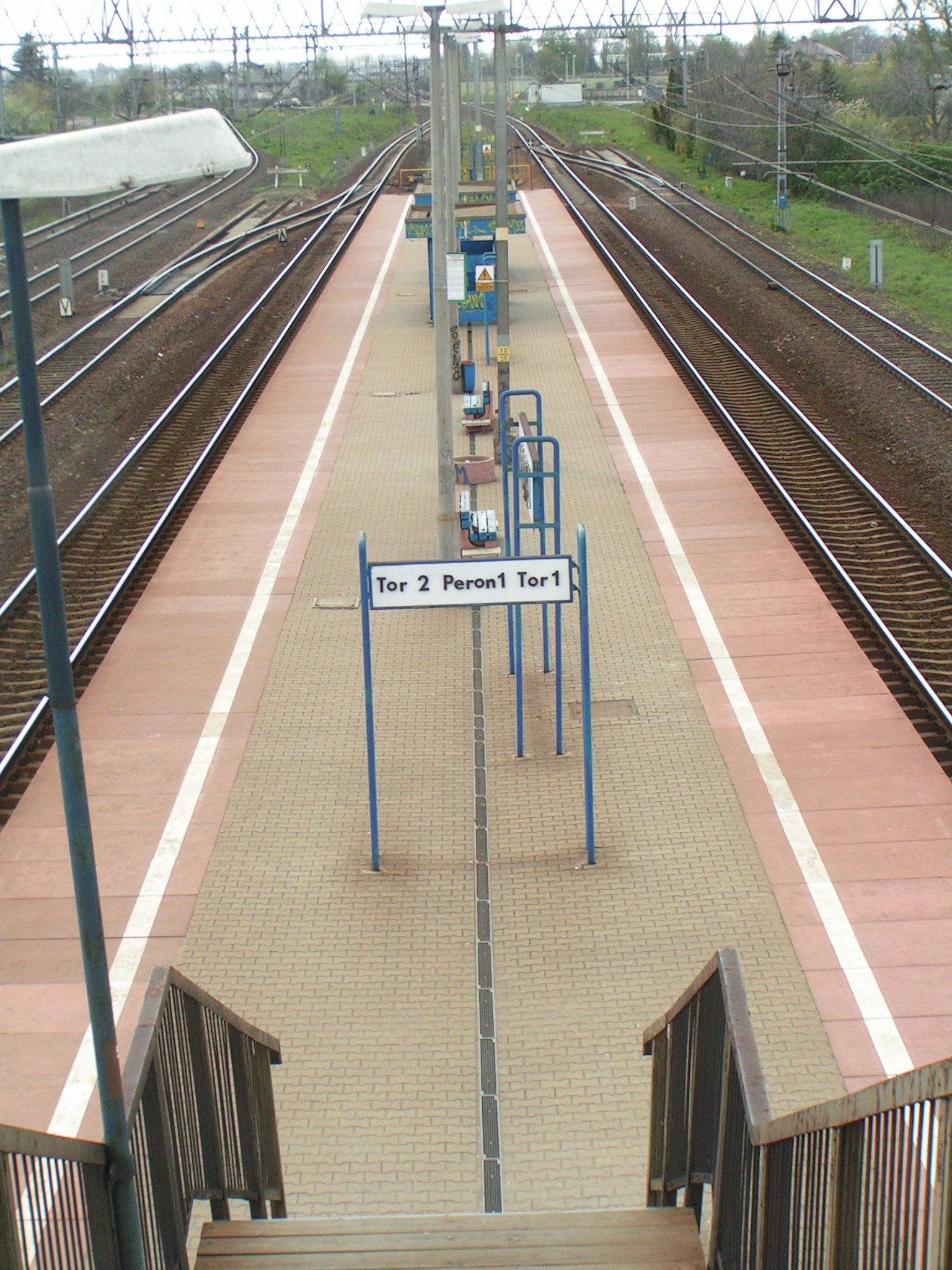

General information
- Location: Ursus, Warsaw, Masovian; Poland
- Coordinates: 52°12′29″N 20°51′45″E
- Owner: Polskie Koleje Państwowe S.A.
- Platforms: 1 centre platform
- Tracks: 2

Services
Preceding station	Masovian Railways	Following station
Ożarów Mazowiecki towards Kutno	R3	Warszawa Ursus Północny towards Warszawa Wschodnia or Warszawa Główna
Location
- Warszawa Gołąbki located on the Warsaw Railway Junction

Warszawa Gołąbki railway station is a railway station in the Ursus district of Warsaw, Poland. The station is served by Masovian Railways, who run trains from Kutno to Warszawa Wschodnia.

The neighbourhood of Gołąbki (pl) was nominally a village in the present-day Warsaw West County. It was incorporated into the town of Ursus in 1954, which became a district of Warsaw in 1977. Notable points of interest include the Church of St. John the Apostle and Evangelist pictured.

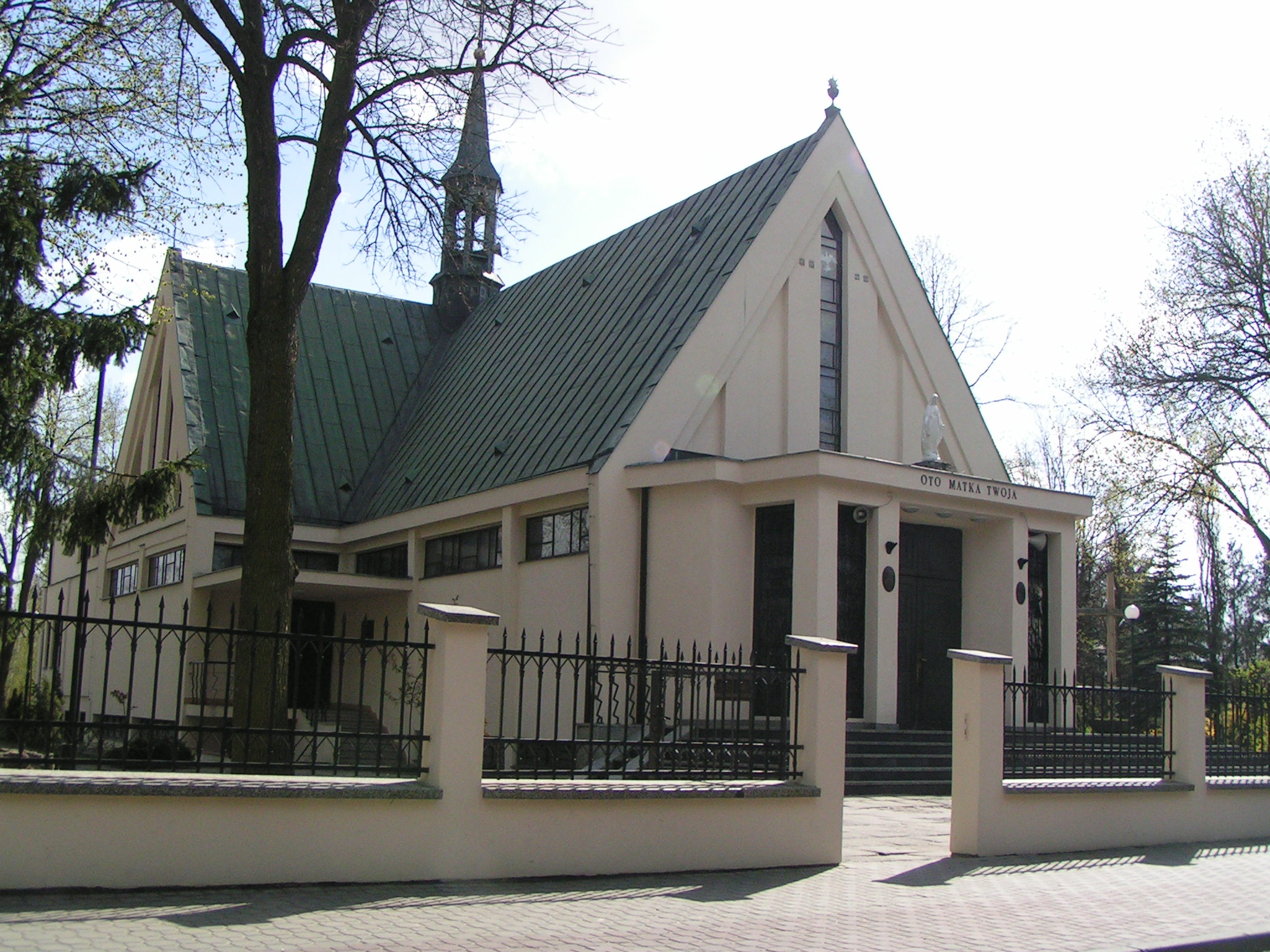
The Church of Św. Jana Apostoła i Ewangelisty, Gołąbki
