= Błonie =

Town in Masovian Voivodeship, Poland

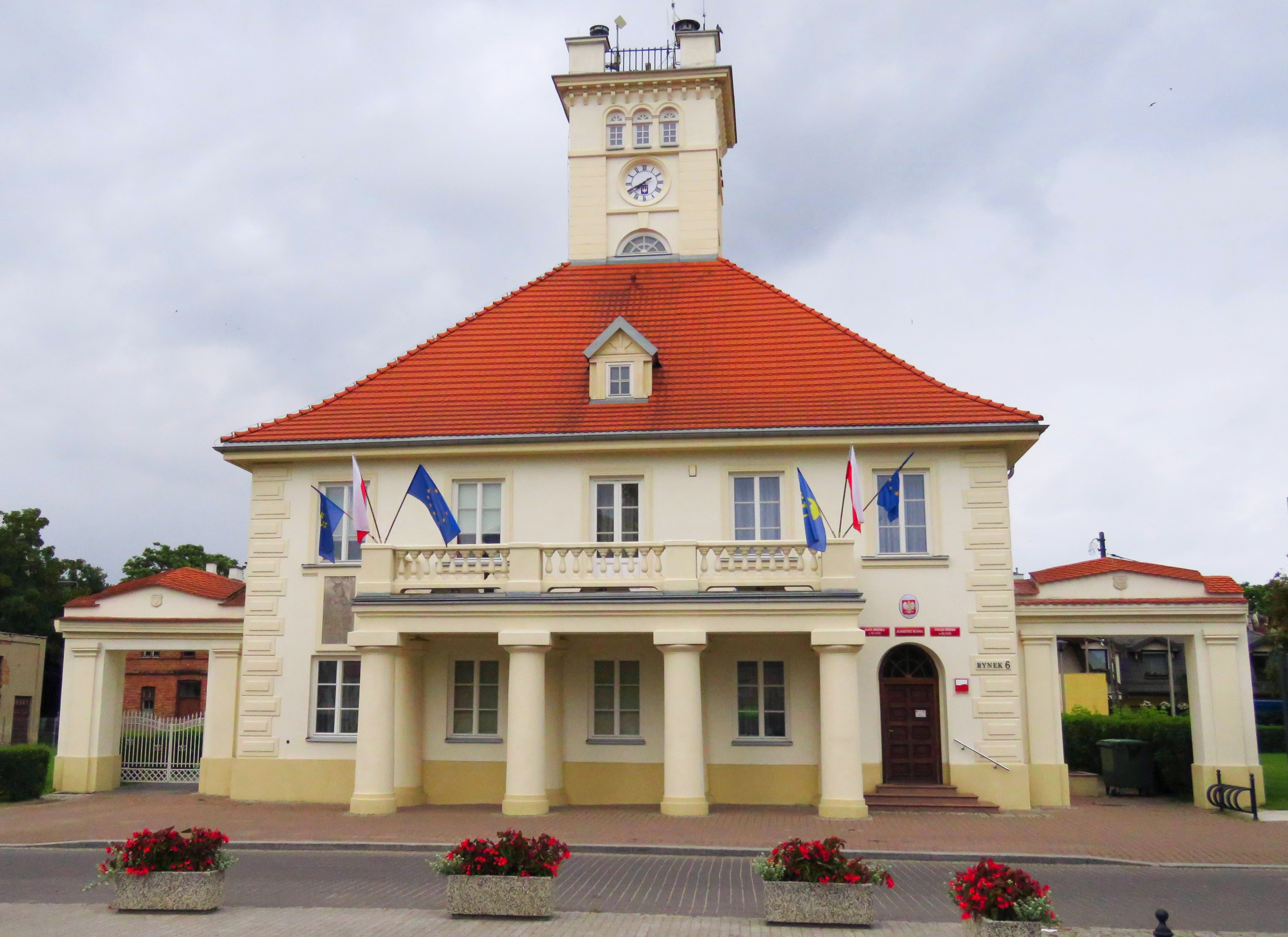
- Town hall designed by Enrico Marconi

- Coat of arms

- Location within Poland
- Coordinates: 52°12′N 20°37′E
- Country: Poland
- Voivodeship: Masovian
- County: Warsaw West
- Gmina: Błonie
- First mentioned: 11th century
- Town rights: 1337

Government
  - Mayor: Zenon Reszka

Area
  - Total: 9.09 km^{2} (3.51 sq mi)

Population (31 December 2021)
  - Total: 12,058
  - Density: 1,327/km^{2} (3,440/sq mi)
- Time zone: UTC+1 (CET)
  - Summer (DST): UTC+2 (CEST)
- Postal code: 05-870 to 05-872
- Area code: +48 22
- Car plates: WZ
- Website: http://www.blonie.pl/

Błonie [ˈbwɔɲɛ] is a town in Warsaw West County, Masovian Voivodeship, Poland.

== History ==
The settlement dates back to the 8th century. It was first mentioned in the 11th century, and already in the 12th century constituted a sizeable settlement with the first church founded in 1257 by Duke Konrad II of Masovia. The church built in the Early Gothic style exists to this day, although rebuilt several times. The town rights were granted to Błonie by Duke Władysław of Kraków on 2 May 1338. Błonie was a royal town of Poland and a county seat in the Masovian Voivodeship in the Greater Poland Province. In the 16th century Błonie was a prosperous town, especially known for shoemaking and brewing. Five annual fairs were held in the town. The town was granted new royal privileges in 1580 and 1688. One of two main routes connecting Warsaw and Dresden ran through the town in the 18th century and Kings Augustus II the Strong and Augustus III of Poland often traveled that route. In 1794, during the Kościuszko Uprising, Poles led by Stanisław Mokronowski won the Battle of Błonie against Prussia.

In the 1921 census, 91.3% of the population declared Polish nationality and 8.6% declared Jewish nationality.

=== World War II ===
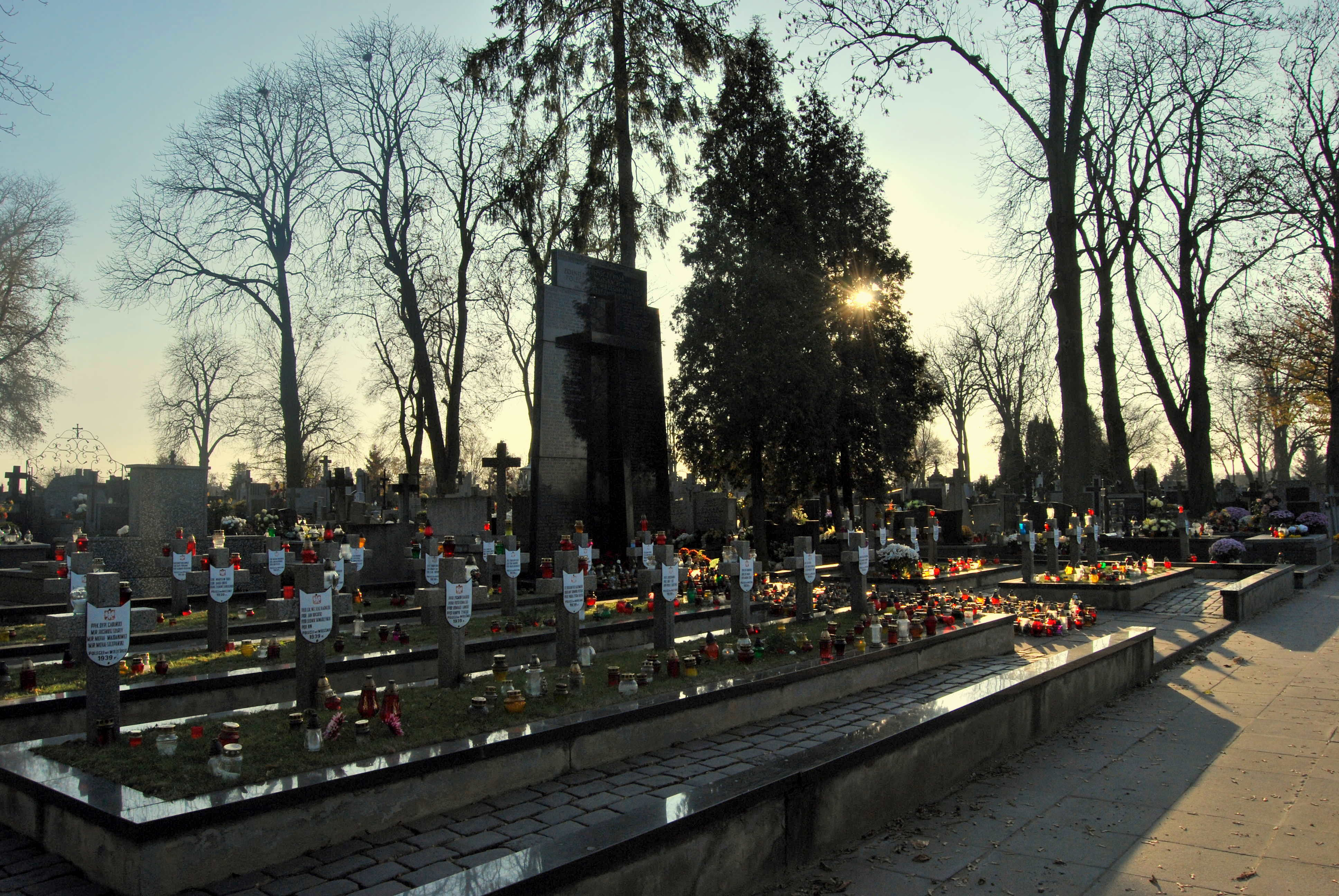
Military cemetery of Polish soldiers fallen in the 1939 defensive war

During the Nazi German invasion of Poland at the onset of World War II, the unit of Leibstandarte SS Adolf Hitler murdered 50 civilians (mostly Jews) on the outskirts of Błonie in a single mass execution, on 18 September 1939. In 1939, the Germans established a transit camp for Polish prisoners of war in the town, and later also a forced labour camp. The Polish resistance movement was active in the town's vicinity. In 1943, local Poles took in a number of kidnapped Polish children from the Zamość region, which were either bought out or secretly taken off German trains.

German authorities established a Jewish ghetto in Błonie in December 1940, in order to confine the Jewish population of the town for the purpose of persecution, terror, and exploitation. The ghetto was liquidated in February 1941, when all its remaining 2,100 Jewish inhabitants were transported aboard the Holocaust train to the Warsaw Ghetto, the largest ghetto in all of German-occupied Europe, with over 400,000 Jews crammed into an area of 1.3 square miles (3.4 km^{2}) (meaning that every person had less than an area 9 feet by 10 feet in which to sleep, eat and walk around the ghetto), or 7.2 persons per room. By the time Poland was liberated from German occupation, not a single Jewish ghetto remained.

== Transport ==
Błonie railway station, opened in 1902 on the Warsaw–Kalisz Railway, is served by Masovian Railways, who run services between Kutno and Warszawa Wschodnia.

== Sports ==
The local football club is Błonianka Błonie. It competes in the lower leagues.

== Twin towns and sister cities ==
Błonie is twinned with:

- Coreno Ausonio, Italy
