= Gmina Głusk =

Gmina Głusk Głusk Commune
- Gmina
- Flag Coat of arms
- Interactive map of Gmina Głusk
- Coordinates (Wilczopole): 51°10′N 22°39′E
- Country: Poland
- Voivodeship: Lublin
- County: Lublin County
- Seat: Głusk, Lublin

Area
  - Total: 64 km^{2} (25 sq mi)

Population (2019)
  - Total: 11,327
  - Density: 180/km^{2} (460/sq mi)
- Website: http://www.glusk.eurzad.eu/

Gmina Głusk is a rural gmina (administrative district) in Lublin County, Lublin Voivodeship, in eastern Poland. It takes its name from Głusk – this was formerly a village, but in 1988 was incorporated into the city of Lublin, and is therefore no longer a part of the territory of Gmina Głusk. Dominów serves as its administrative seat. The gmina lies to the south-east of the regional capital Lublin. It covers an area of 64 square kilometres (24.7 sq mi), and as of 2019 its total population is 11,327 (9,633 in 2013).

== Villages ==
Gmina Głusk contains the villages and settlements of Abramowice Prywatne, Ćmiłów, Dominów, Głuszczyzna, Kalinówka, Kazimierzówka, Kliny, Majdan Mętowski, Mętów, Nowiny, Prawiedniki, Prawiedniki-Kolonia, Wilczopole, Wilczopole-Kolonia, Wólka Abramowicka and Żabia Wola.

== Neighbouring gminas ==
Gmina Głusk is bordered by the towns of Lublin and Świdnik, and by the gminas of Jabłonna, Mełgiew, Niedrzwica Duża, Piaski and Strzyżewice.
