= Korzeniówka, Podlaskie Voivodeship =

Korzeniówka
- Village
- Location within Poland
- Coordinates: 52°33′34″N 22°53′18″E
- Country: Poland
- Voivodeship: Podlaskie
- County: Siemiatycze
- Gmina: Dziadkowice

Korzeniówka [kɔʐɛˈɲufka] is a village in the administrative district of Gmina Dziadkowice, within Siemiatycze County, Podlaskie Voivodeship, in north-eastern Poland.

According to the 1921 census, the village was inhabited by 138 people, among whom 135 were Roman Catholic, 1 Orthodox, and 2 Mosaic. At the same time, 136 inhabitants declared Polish nationality, 2 Jewish. There were 26 residential buildings in the village.
