= Kaisiepo =

Kaisiepo is a surname. Notable people with the surname include:

- Viktor Kaisiepo (1948–2010), Papauan activist
- Frans Kaisiepo (1921–1979), Papauan activist
