= Van Hulst =

van Hulst is a Dutch surname. Notable people with the surname include:

- Dominique Rijpma van Hulst (born 1981), Dutch singer known as Do
- Elly van Hulst (born 1959), Dutch runner
- Johan van Hulst (1911–2018), Dutch politician and professor
- Jan van Hulst (1903–1975), Dutch resistance fighter
- Wim van Hulst (1939–2018), Dutch business economist
