= Lucas Bolsius =

Dutch historian and politician

Bolsius at work, 2007

Lucas Bolsius (born 16 December 1958 in The Hague, South Holland) is a Dutch historian and politician of the Christian Democratic Appeal and since 31 August 2010 mayor of the city of Amersfoort.

Bolsius studied social history at Erasmus University Rotterdam. He was a member of the States of South Holland for the Christian Democratic Appeal between 1995 and 1998. In 1998 he became member of the municipal council of Rotterdam for the same party. He performed several jobs before becoming a full-time politician in 2002 when he became an alderman of the municipality of Rotterdam. His responsibilities included social affairs, quarters and public space. After the 2006 elections he continued as alderman. This time his responsibilities include financial affairs, sports and public space.
