= Koppelpoort =

Medieval gate in the Dutch city of Amersfoort

Coordinates: 52°09′32″N 5°23′07″E

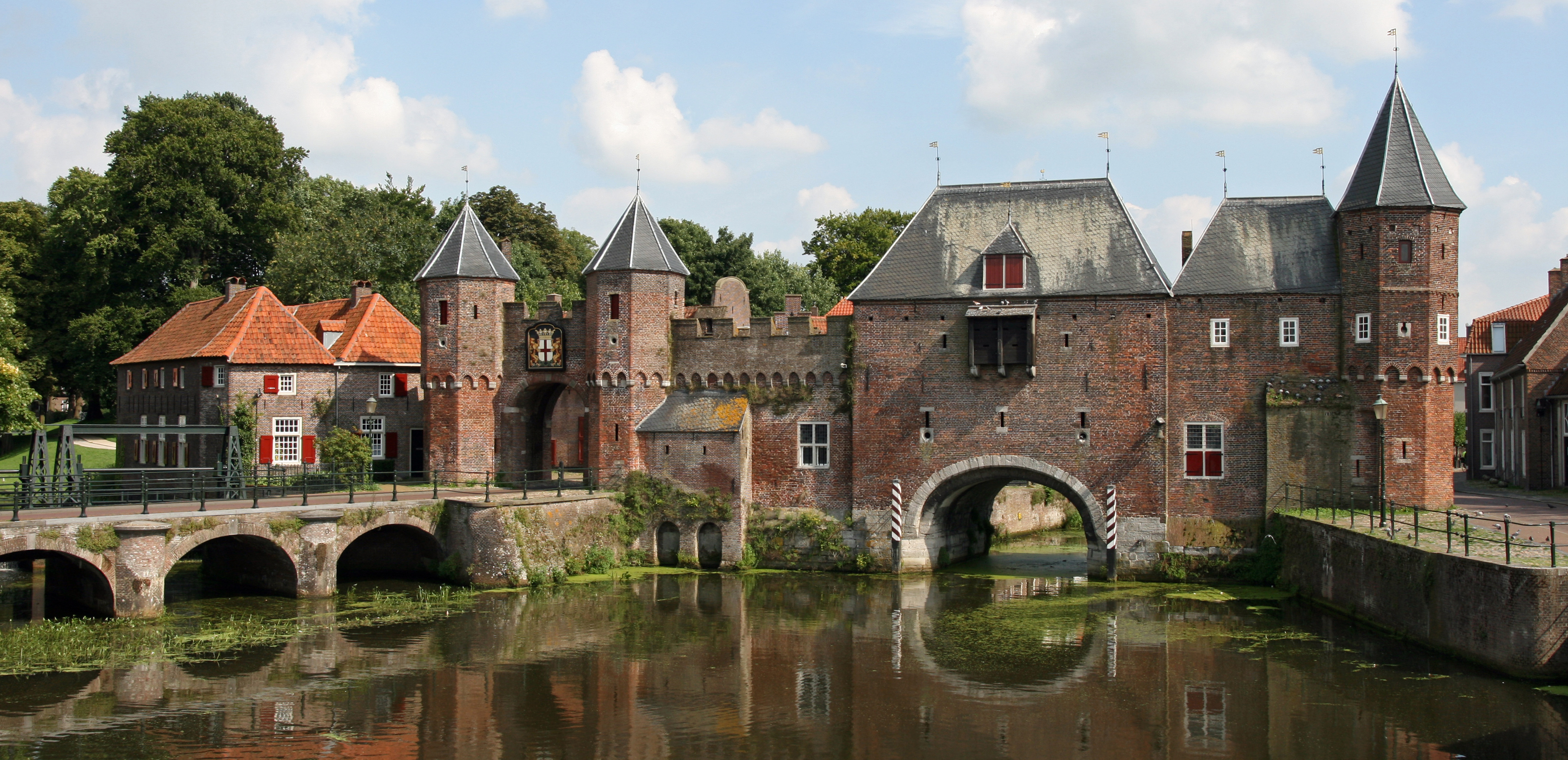
Northwestern facade

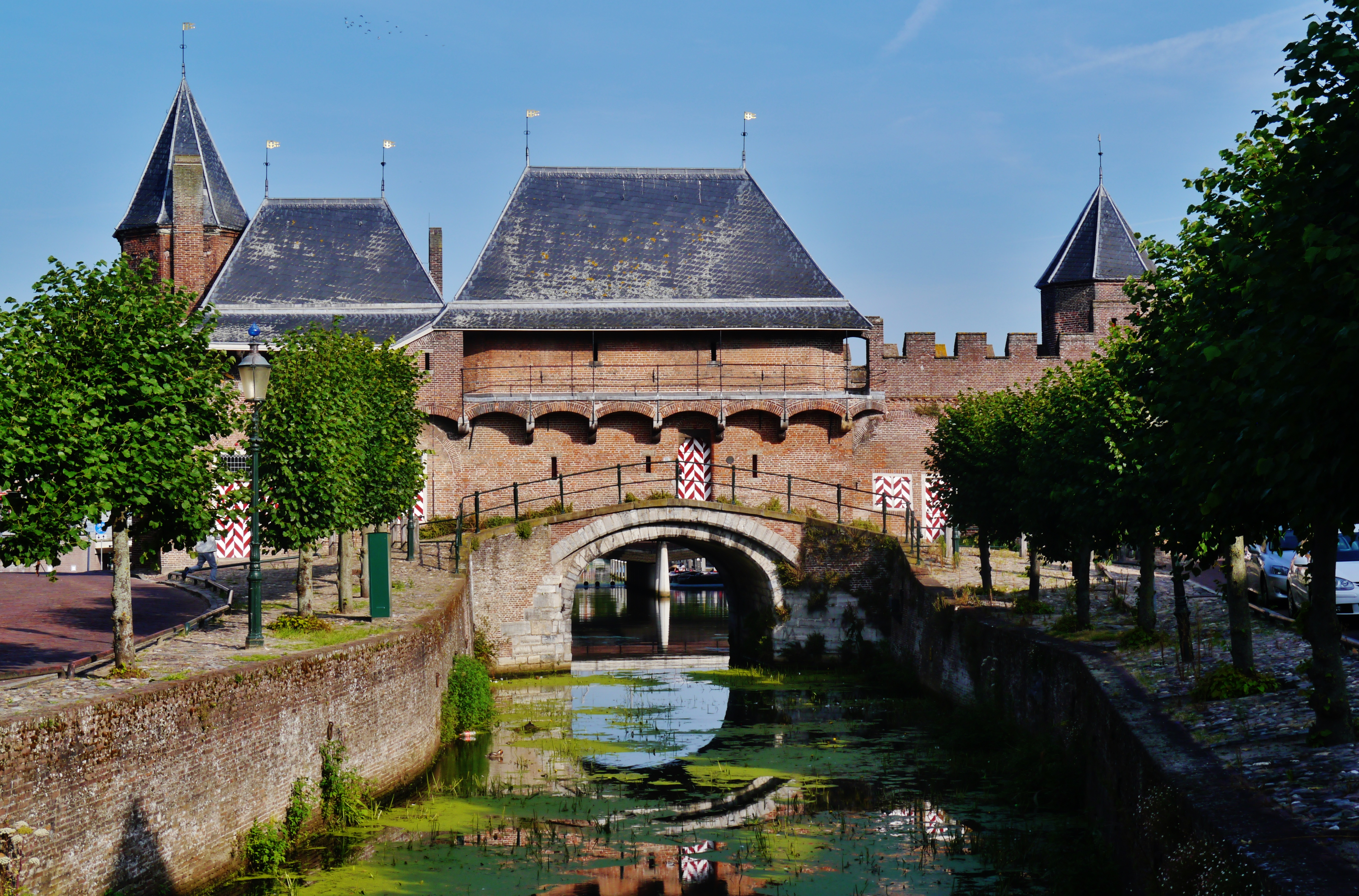
Southeastern facade

The Koppelpoort is a medieval gate in the Dutch city of Amersfoort, province of Utrecht. Completed around 1425, it combines land and water-gates, and is part of the second city wall of Amersfoort, which was constructed between 1380 and 1450.

== History ==
The gate was built between 1380 and 1425 as part of the second city wall. The whole wall was completed around 1450. The gate was attacked in 1427 during the siege of the city. This attack was repelled.

The gate was opened and closed every day by the appointed raddraaiers, "wheel-turners". A minimum of twelve wheel-turners were collected morning and evening by several guards. It was an extremely dangerous task; if they did not begin walking simultaneously, then one could fall, dragging the rest along with often fatal results. Before the gate could come down, it had to be raised, to pull out the iron pins that held it in place. Only then could it come down. While the gate was going down, walking in the wheel grew ever easier and faster, and many people stumbled and broke their limbs. The Koppelpoort was also never breached.

The Koppelpoort was given its current appearance during the restoration by Pierre Cuypers in 1885 and 1886. Among other things, Cuypers removed a step between the two gates and replaced it with a slope.

From 1969 to 1993 a puppet theater was situated in the gate.

The latest restoration was completed in 1996. It was carried out very cautiously, and with respect for the old building materials. For this the town of Amersfoort received the Europa Nostra Award.

== See also ==
- Medieval warfare
- Medieval architecture
