= Paul Cobben =

Dutch philosopher

Paul Gulian Cobben (born 5 June 1951 in Amersfoort) is a Dutch philosopher. His main contribution to philosophy is that he has given an immanent critique of G.W.F. Hegel's philosophy. His research specializes in Hegel's Phenomenology of Spirit (1807), Science of Logic (1812) and the Elements of the Philosophy of Right (1821). He taught at the universities of Amsterdam and Tilburg.

== Publications in English ==
- Value in Capitalist Society: Rethinking Marx's Criticism of Capitalism (2015)
- The Paradigm of Recognition: Freedom as Overcoming the Fear of Death (2012)
- Institutions of education: then and today: the legacy of German idealism (2010)
- The Nature of the Self: Recognition in the Form of Right and Morality (2009)
- How Natural is the Ethical Law? (1997)
