= Carolein Smit =

Dutch ceramic art sculptor (born 1960)

Carolein Smit (born 1960) is a Dutch ceramic art sculptor whose work often includes animals or skeletons.

== Life and education ==
Smit was born on 22 October 1960 in Amersfoort. She was educated at the AKV St. Joost in Breda from 1979 to 1984, studying graphics and lithography. For the next thirteen years she works as an illustration artist for various magazines and newspapers until a 3-months residency at the European Ceramic Work Center (ECWC) in Den Bosch in 1995 during which she falls in love with clay. As of this moment, she chooses ceramics as her favorite medium of expression and employs transgressive beauty that contradicts commonly held convictions about what makes something appealing. Her fascination with contrasts: the ugly but adorable, or the frightening but fragile, provides a reminder about the vulnerability and impermanence of life, and the inevitability of death.

== Career ==
Smit is known for figurative "enigmatic sculptures" depicting ceramic animals like dogs, hares or rats. Her sculptures satirically play with the emotions such as hate, love, exuberance, alienation and unresolved emotions, using highly imaginative representations of skeletons, cats or babies. She creates characters with over active sentiment, inspired by themes from classic mythology and biblical tales, such as greed, power and impotence, perishability and death. Her sculptures are rich in symbolism and she often uses elements familiar to vanities, such as skulls, skeletons, small bones of animals. Much like in the 16th and 17th century Dutch Golden Age Vanitas paintings, that were a type of symbolic artwork especially associated with still life painting in Flanders and the Netherlands, her work is meant to symbolise temporary presence but with a touch of irony.

Several of Smit's works are in the collection of the Victoria and Albert Museum in London. In 2003, she had a solo exhibition at the Keramion, a ceramics museum and center in Frechen, Germany. In 2010, over 60 of her sculptures were on display in a solo exhibition at the Kunsthal museum in Rotterdam. The exhibition lasted over three months and was the first major retrospective of her work. A review of the exhibition in Beelden Magazine stated that Smit produces "striking ceramic sculptures in which a bizarre baroque figuration results in contemporary, quirky images".

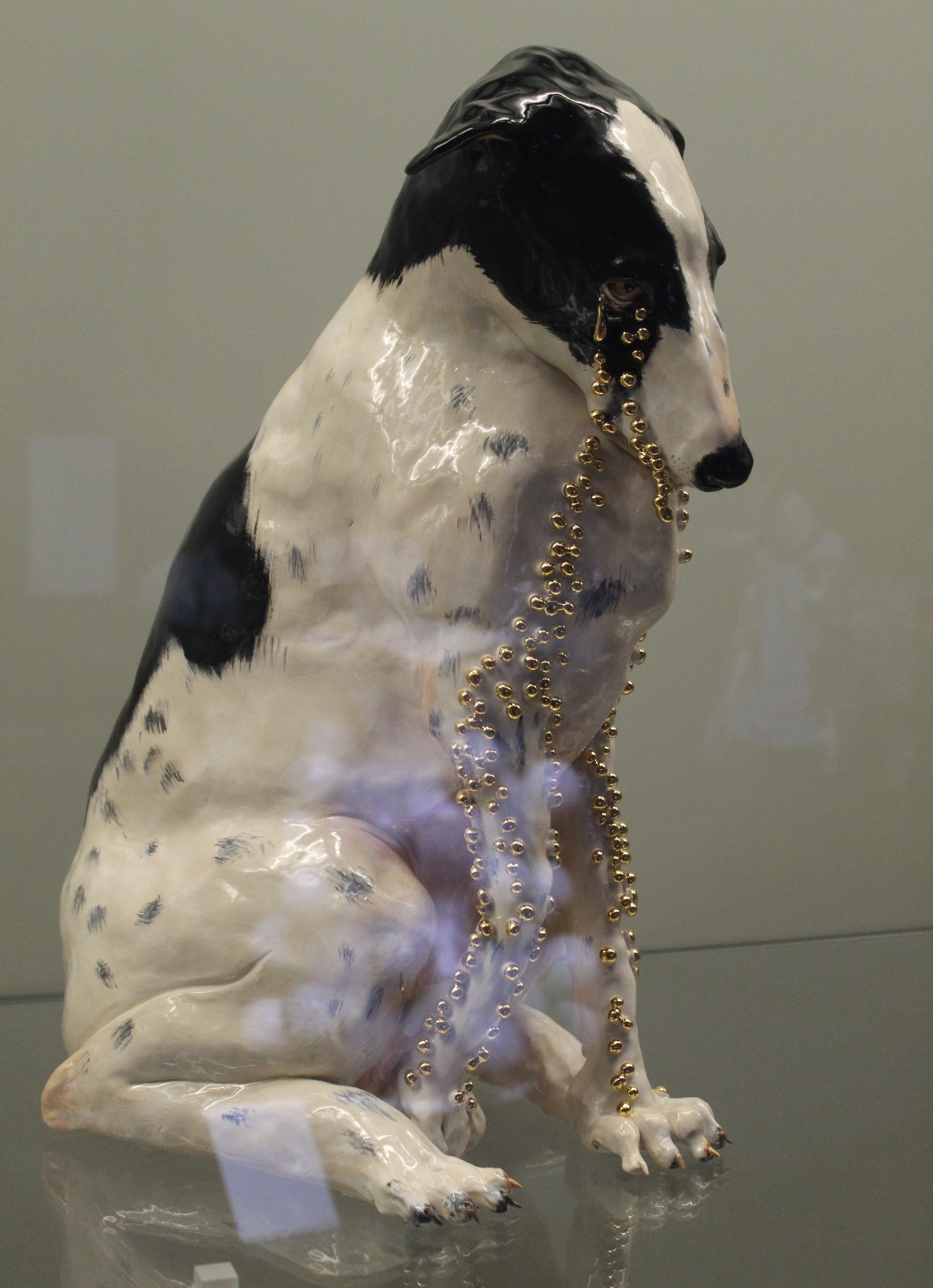
Rascal with Golden Tears, 2009, Victoria and Albert Museum, London

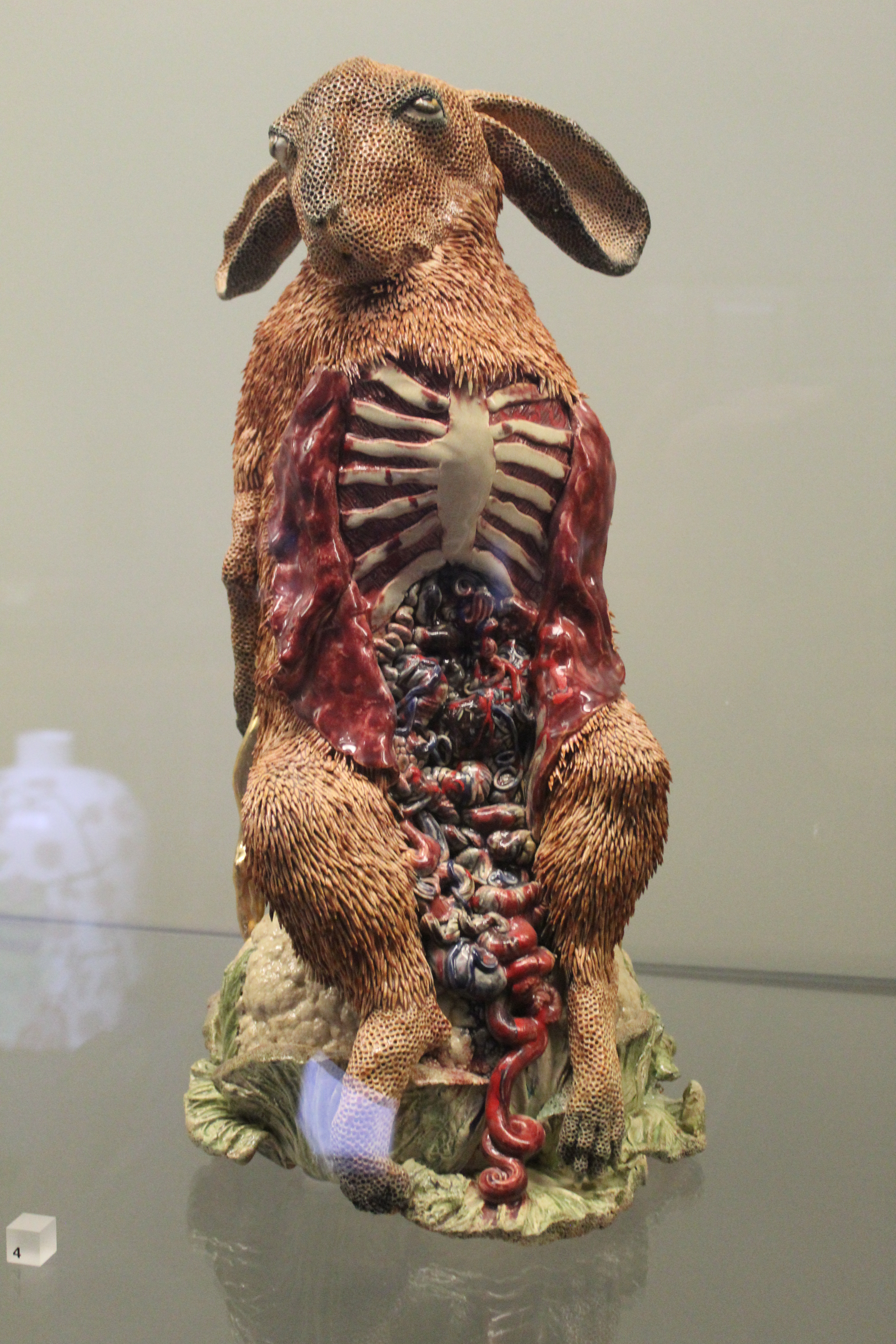
Hare on a Cauliflower with Knife and Fork, 2010, Victoria and Albert Museum, London

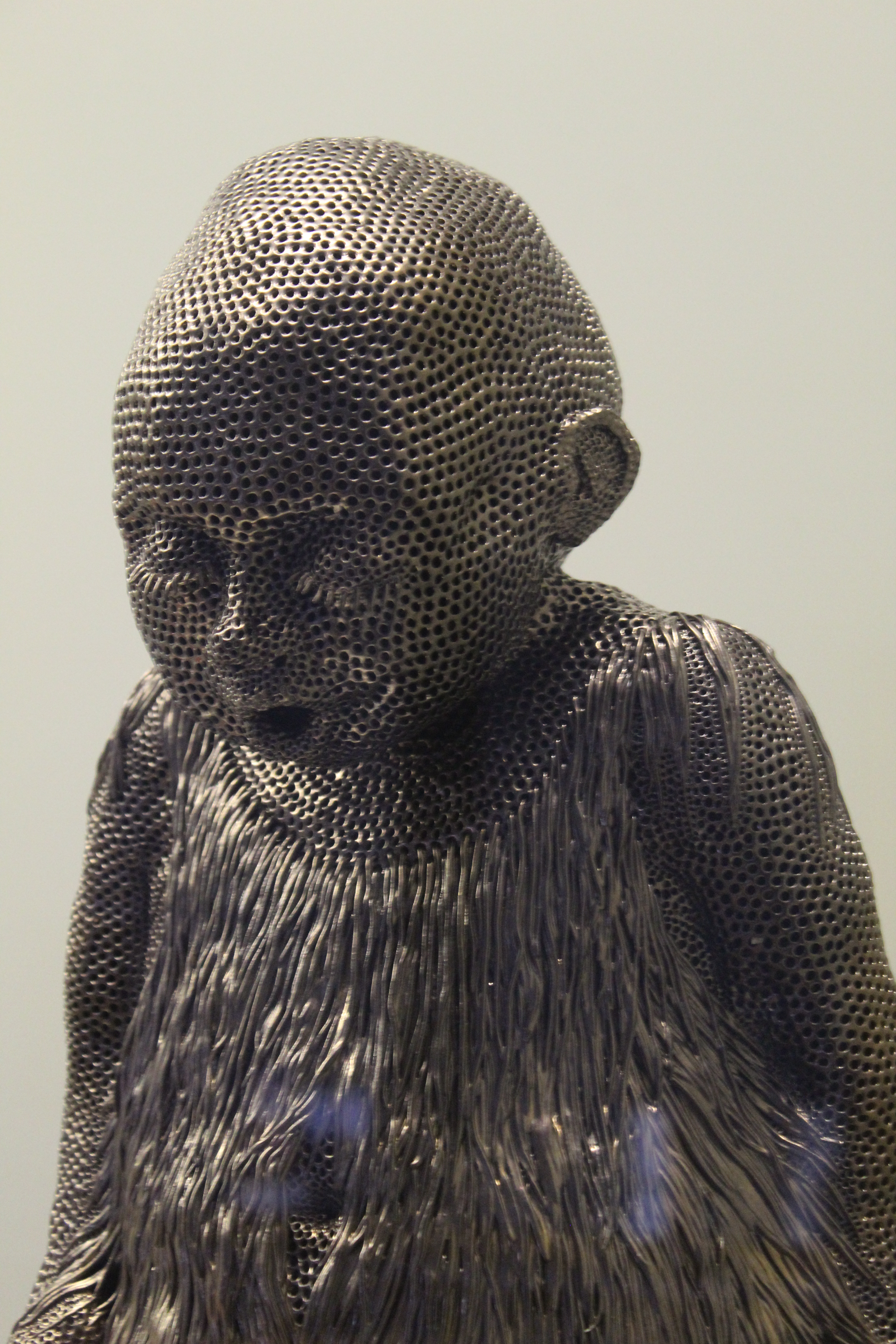
Child, 2007, Victoria and Albert Museum, London

== Technics ==
Smit uses white clay that contains very little chamotte in order to avoid having a granular material on the surface of her works. The sculptures are hollow, with slabs of clay, and hand-modeled. Pieces like the hare with an umbrella and animals that have hair are all made separately by hand and added one by one. The pieces are very fragile when not yet fired at 1020 degrees, but relatively strong when glazed, as everything sticks with the glaze in between.

=== Cabinet of curiosities ===
The cabinet of curiosities which has been considered as the first museum, was the place where the collectors showed their objects. The creation of Carolein Smit expresses her love for the cabinet of curiosities. She is involved with the multiple aspects shown in this type of collection which contains all images related to art but also to the scientific and other broader areas. Smit seeks to demonstrate in her ceramics this ambivalence that makes the viewer look with admire and disgust at the same time.

==== Bestiary ====
The bestiary is the theme that often occurs in Smit's artworks. The dogs, rabbits, sheep, monkeys, owls, etc. are all given a glittering skin which makes them the unreal and attractive. Smit works also carefully with the details, like the eyes and the fur of her raptors, rats and pugs. In her exhibition at Musée de la Chasse et de la Nature in Paris, Dents ! Crocs ! Griffes !, her animals are being gathered and thus the visitors can see and "read" the bestiary of Carolein Smit. The cabinet of curiosities often included medical oddities, tumors, anatomical and pathological specimens. Inspired by this way of collecting and showing objects, Smit creates numerous skeletons and skinned figures as a demonstration of the combination of art and science.

==== Biblical Scenes ====
Smit once said that not only she treated anatomical objects as source of her inspiration, but also she took regularly the devotion and biblical scenes as image for her ceramics. The figures can be monstrous and at the same time like someone coaxing and appealing. They are the talismans that keep us from misfortune and death.

== Exhibitions ==
Museum exhibitions

2022

- Dents ! Crocs ! Griffes !, Musée de la Chasse et de la Nature à Paris, Paris, France
- Secret Garden, with Gebroeders Miedema, Stedelijk Museum Kampen, Netherlands

2021

- Les Flammes : L'Âge de la Céramique, Musée d'Art Moderne de Paris, Paris, France

2020

- Bye Bye Future! L'art de voyager dans le temps, Musée royal de Mariemont, Belgium

2019

- Zarte Flügel, dicke Brummer, Museum Keramion, Frechen, Germany
- Raketstart, Stedelijk Museum Breda, Breda, Netherlands
- Drents Museum à Assen, Netherlands

2018

- L'amour fou, Grassi Museum, Leipzig, Germany
- Myth and Mortality, The fairytale world of Carolein Smit, Victoria and Albert museum, London, United Kingdom

2016

- Sexy Ceramics, Museum het Princessenhof, Leeuwarden, Netherlands
- Ceramix, Bonnefantenmuseum, Maastricht, Allemagne & La Maison Rouge, Paris, France

2015

- Skeletten, Museum Beelden aan Zee, Scheveningen, Netherlands
- Queensize - Female Artists from the Olbricht Collection, Arnhems Museum, Netherlands

Exhibitions

2022

- FRAGILES, Galerie Da-End, Paris, France
- Eden, James Freeman Gallery, Londres, United Kingdom
- Μέδουσα / Medusa, Galerie Da-End, Paris, France
- Bloodhound & Friends, Galerie Fontana, Amsterdam, Netherlands
- Cabinet de céramique contemporaine, Jonathan F. Kugel, Brussels, Belgium
- Cabinet Da-End XI - Asile in wonderland, Galerie Da-End, Paris, France

2021

- Nyctophilia, James Freeman Gallery, Londres, United Kingdom
- Cabinet Da-End X, Galerie Da-End, Paris, France

2020

- Beyond the vessel, Messums Wiltshire, Tisbury, United Kingdom
- Vanitas, Tiendschuur, Tegelen, Netherlands

2019

- Beyond the vessel, Mesher, Istanbul, Turkey
- The child in me, Istanbul Biennale, Turkey
- Vanitas, Tiendschuur, Tegelen, Netherlands
- Galeristes, with Galerie Da-End, Carreau du Temple, Paris, France

2018

- Carolein Smit and Ray Caesar, James Freeman Gallery, London, United Kingdom
- TEFAF, with Galerie Patrice Trigano de Paris (theme: The Body), Maastricht
- TEFAF, with Galerie Michael Haas de Berlin, Maastricht

2017

- Paizô, duo show with Mike MacKeldey, Galerie Da-End, Paris, France
- Galeristes, with Galerie Da-End, Carreau du Temple, Paris, France
- Cabinet Da-End VII, Galerie Da-End, Paris, France
- Art Paris, avec Flatland Gallery d'Amsterdam, Paris, France
- First Biennale of De heilige Driehoek, Oosterhout, Pays-Bas

2016

- Galeristes, with Galerie Da-End, Carreau du Temple, Paris, France
- Golem, Carolein Smit (Solo Show), Galerie Michèle Hayem, Paris, France
- Cabinet Da-End VI, Galerie Da-End, Paris, France
- Omnia vanitas, WCC-BF Gallery, Les Anciens Abattoirs, Mons, Belgique

2015

- Lʼamour fou (Solo Show), Flatland Gallery, Amsterdam, Pays-Bas
- Objectif Terre, Biennale internationale de Céramique de Châteauroux, Châteauroux, France

== Collections ==
- Grassimuseum, Leipzig, Germany
- Olbricht Collection, Germany
- Reydon Weiss Collection, Bremen, Germany
- Asante Collection, Basel, Switzerland
- Bouwfonds, Hoevelaken, Netherlands
- Knoll Design Nederland, Netherlands
- Interpolis, Tilburg, Netherlands
- FSGroep, Hilversum, Netherlands
- Collection Eneco Energie, Rotterdam, Netherlands
- Collection J. Schwartz, New York, USA
- Victoria and Albert Museum, London, United Kingdom
- Badisches Landesmuseum, Karlsruhe, Germany
- Scheringa Museum for Realism, Spanbroek, Netherlands
- Museum Beelden aan Zee, Scheveningen, Netherlands
- Fuled International Museum (FLICAM) Fuping, China
- Drents Museum, Assen, Netherlands
- Collection Ömer Koç, Istanbul, Turkey
