= Jan van Hulst =

Dutch resistance member (1903–1975)

- Jan and Paula van Hulst and their daughters (left to right) Myriam, Hannah, and Alexandra
- Born: 18 December 1903; Nijmegen, Netherlands
- Died: 1 August 1975 (aged 71); Amersfoort, Netherlands
- Occupation: Engineer
- Known for: World War II resistance member, helped Jews to safety, provided them with false identification

Jan van Hulst (18 December 1903 – 1 August 1975) was a Dutch engineer who was active in the Dutch resistance during the Second World War. He was instrumental in preventing Jews from being deported and killed during the Holocaust, and is recognized as Righteous Among the Nations.

== First actions ==
Van Hulst first became involved in this work when the parents of his Jewish wife, Paula, were arrested along with her aunt and held in Amsterdam as a temporary way station before being deported to a Nazi concentration camp in German-occupied Poland. Van Hulst convinced the Germans in command that his mother-in-law was a Belgian Catholic who had been expelled from Belgium to the Netherlands when World War I broke out, due to her husband having an Austrian passport. Van Hulst claimed that she had been accidentally registered as Jewish when she was granted Dutch citizenship. To convince the German commanders of his loyalty, he praised their efforts to deport Jews, but warned them against being overzealous and deporting non-Jews by mistake. When his mother-in-law confirmed his account, she and her husband (at that time, Jews with Gentile spouses were exempt from deportation) were released. In addition, this protected her relatives, and Paula van Hulst—now registered as a "half-Jew" married to a Gentile—was exempt from deportation.

== Falsification strategies ==
Van Hulst's involvement in preventing the deportation of Jews continued, providing them with shelter in his own house, and by falsifying identification papers for them, or using the expertise of the anthropologist Arie de Froe to call into question their racial background. Van Hulst presented this spurious evidence at the German government compound once or twice a week, wearing the long coat and wide-brimmed hat typically worn by Gestapo agents or Dutch collaborators. By presenting this evidence, Van Hulst would be then able to initiate an investigation into that Jew's racial background, delaying their deportation. For this falsification to remain convincing, Van Hulst occasionally let a Jew's actual identity be revealed, having previously made certain the person was hidden and safe from deportation.

=== The example of Emmy Elffers ===
One example of the sometimes complicated process needed to falsify identification papers involved Emmy Elffers, a photographer. To do this required falsified records to make it appear that her Jewish father was not her biological father. To achieve that, Van Hulst went to a doctor known for saving all his records, convinced him to show him his files, and stole the file containing Elffers’ father's medical records. Dick Elffers, Emmy's husband and an artist, forged records to show that Elffers’ father was unable to have children due to a severe case of the mumps. Disguised as a gas inspector, Van Hulst then returned the file to its place.

To also prove that Elffers' father was non-Jewish, Van Hulst went to Venlo and stole a ledger from a hotel there, modifying it to show that Elffers’ mother and a man with an obviously non-Jewish name had registered for a room forty years and nine months before. When Van Hulst found someone who agreed to identify himself as that man, Elffers was declared half-Jewish and was no longer in danger of deportation.

== Decoy hideout ==
To conceal people in his house, he smuggled in fourteen square meters of bricks, mortar, and boards, and built a second wall in the attic. He also built a decoy hideout, designed to be possible to find, but hidden well enough to be convincing. It contained chocolate, cognac, and cigarettes to distract searchers, as well as forged papers that would cost officials time investigating false information.

== House raid ==
During the Dutch famine of 1944, Paula van Hulst was hospitalized with a serious chronic kidney disease. In January 1945, Van Hulst learned that a Jewish colleague, Harry Romp, had been arrested. Van Hulst successfully recovered Romp's radio transmitter (used for contacting London) and brought it to his house, but he was seen and followed. On January 29, 1945, when Van Hulst was visiting his wife at the hospital, his house was raided by a soldier and a Dutch collaborator searching for the radio transmitter. His daughter Hannah (aged twelve in 1945) later described the incident:

I ran to the kitchen and turned the key to lock the back door. ‘Open the door,’ [the soldier] shouted, and I shouted back, ‘I can’t, the lock is rusty; the key is stuck.’ I fumbled a little with the key, feigning to do my best, and shouted: ‘Wait, somebody is ringing the front doorbell.’ However, instead of going to the front door, I went to the staircase and turned the light switch on and off, on and off … That particular switch, working on a hidden battery concocted by Papa, was connected to a buzzer in the room where Uncle Frits, aunt Kitty, and Anne lived. The doorbell kept ringing. My mind saw the Jews vanishing behind the double wall in the attic. I opened the front door. The German soldier ran to the kitchen door and he turned the key to let his pal in.

— --"The Righteous Among the Nations: Rescuers of Jews During the Holocaust"

The Dutch collaborator became suspicious about the large amount of food being cooked, and asked Hannah where her parents were, which she did not answer clearly. After locking her and her sister Myriam in the study, the soldier and collaborator searched the house, looking primarily for the radio transmitter. The two sisters attracted the attention of a passing neighbor and signaled him to warn Van Hulst by holding up two sheets of paper with "Warn Papa" written on them. However, the neighbor did not know Van Hulst's whereabouts. When Van Hulst's youngest daughter, Alexandria, returned home, she went to the passing neighbor's house and told him that Van Hulst was visiting his wife at the hospital, making it possible for the neighbor to contact and warn him. The false papers were found and had their intended effect by providing the searchers with misleading information. Following this incident, Van Hulst went into hiding, but emerged to attend his wife's funeral in February of that year.

== Post-war activity ==
Following World War II, Van Hulst returned to his previous engineering employment and refused honors for his wartime work. According to Rudy Reisel, one of his associates who later moved to Israel, he said, "I did not do what I did in order to have my name remembered. My work was an obligation in those days." Van Hulst was posthumously granted the title of Righteous Among the Nations by the Israeli organization Yad Vashem in 1997.
