= Viktor Kaisiepo =

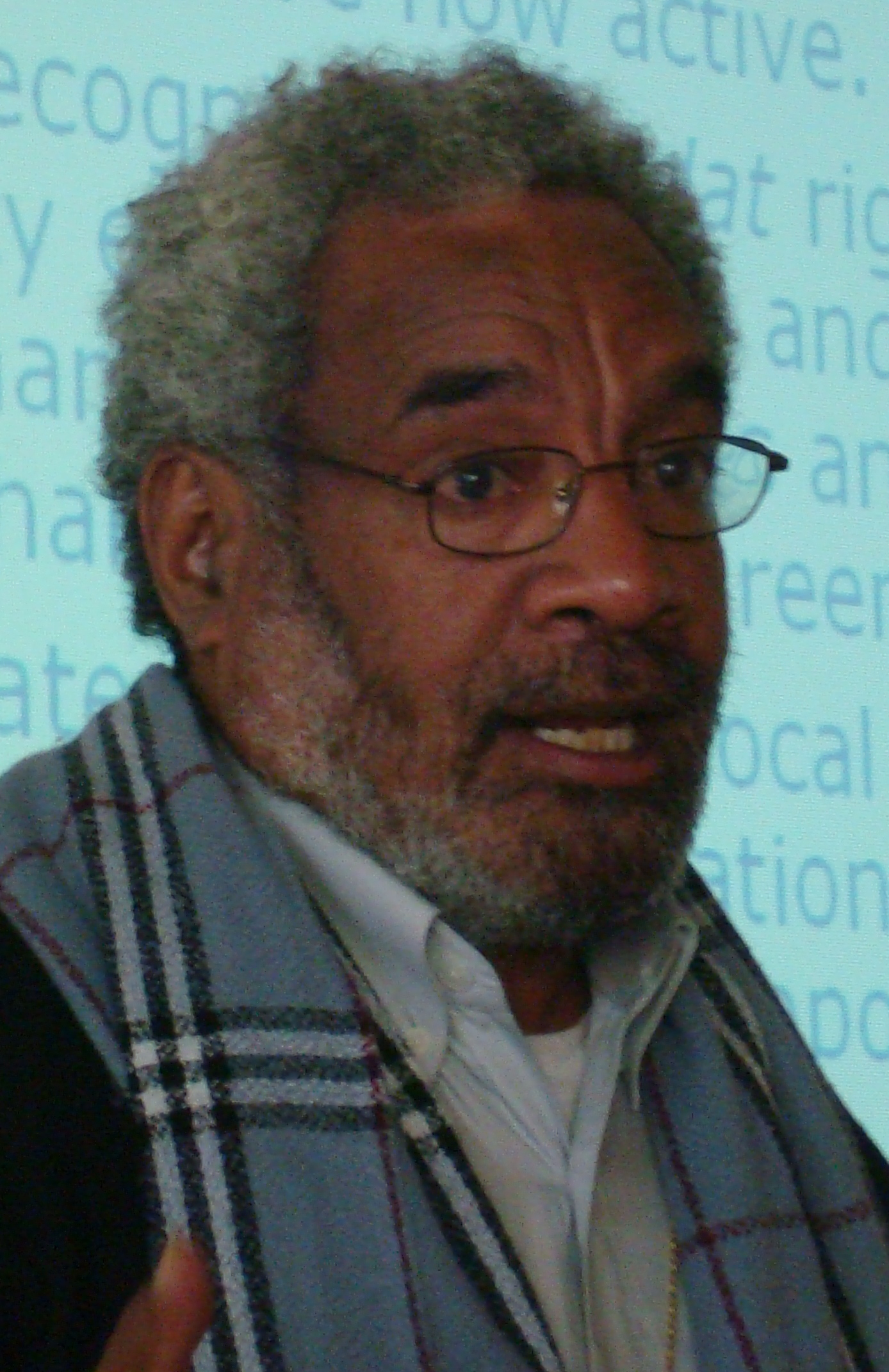
Viktor Kaisiepo at a conference in Iserlohn, Germany in autumn 2007

Viktor Kaisiepo (14 September 1948 – 31 January 2010), also spelled Victor Kaisiepo, was a Netherlands New Guinean-born Dutch activist for West Papuan independence and self-determination. His family fled West Papua when its administration was transferred to Indonesia, and he lived in the Netherlands thereafter.

== Biography ==
=== Early life ===
Kaisiepo was born in the Netherlands New Guinea in 1948. Kaisiepo's family, known as the Kaisiepo clan, was originally from Biak, an island in Cenderawasih Bay just north of New Guinea. His father, Markus Wonggor Kaisiepo (1913–2000), a minister and elementary school teacher for the Dutch Reformed Church Mission and former official in the Dutch New Guinea colonial government, was an advocate for West Papuan self-determination. His father's cousin, Frans Kaisiepo, was an advocate for Indonesian annexation of West New Guinea, and became a national hero of Indonesia.

The United Nations in 1948 had noted with satisfaction that Indonesia was an independent state, and that the Netherlands New Guinea (West New Guinea) was a separate Dutch colonial possession. From 1949 the Netherlands resisted Indonesian demands for the Netherlands New Guinea which the Netherlands asserted was Melanesian with predominate Christian and animist traditions separate from Indonesia.

Markus Kaisiepo won a seat on the New Guinea Council in the elections held in January 1961 and took office in April. The Dutch government under pressure from the United States in 1962 decided to transfer administration of the territory to the United Nations while Indonesia was petitioning the United Nations to appoint Indonesia as the administrator. Markus Kaisiepo moved his family, including Viktor, to the Netherlands soon after the hand-over was announced.

=== Advocate for Papuan self-determination ===
Once in the Netherlands, Markus Kaisiepo continued to advocate for the independence of West Papua. Viktor Kaisiepo took up his father's cause, becoming a leading international advocate for the sovereignty movement. Kaisiepo believed that there several ways to guarantee human rights for Papuans besides political independence for West Papua. He lobbied the United Nations for Papua's inclusion on the United Nations list of non-self-governing territories and served as a spokesperson for the West Papua People’s Front, a coalition of Papuan organizations in the Netherlands. He also advocated for the human rights of other indigenous people worldwide. Viktor was a founding member of the international Indigenous Peoples' rights organization Land is Life, which was founded at the historic World Conference of Indigenous Peoples on Territories, Environment and Development in May of 1992.

In May 2000, Viktor Kaisiepo made his first visit to West Papua since the family left in 1962. Indonesian President Abdurrahman Wahid, who was elected in 1999, had introduced a more open form of government in Indonesia since the fall of Suharto. Wahid had changed the name of Indonesian-controlled Western New Guinea from the Indonesian Irian Jaya to the previous name, Papua.

Kaisiepo saw an opportunity to travel back to West Papua during Wahid's presidency. In May 2000, Kaisiepo flew back to West Papua for the first time in thirty-eight years. Kaisiepo first flew from the Indonesian capital, Jakarta, to the island of Biak, the home of the Kaisiepo family.

He then travelled to Jayapura, the capital of Papua. He attended the Papuan Congress in Jayapura, which appointed Kaisiepo as a member of the Papuan Presidium, the executive governing body of the Free Papua Movement. In a speech before the Papuan Congress, Kaisiepo told the audience, "I dream not of the UN, I work there. The Decolonisation Committee of the UN has a list with seventeen regions eligible for independence. West Papua is not on that list. But the outcome of our struggle does not depend on a UN list. We can ensure that West Papua gets on that list and I can help you accomplish that."

Viktor Kaisiepo father, Markus, died in the Netherlands at the age of 87, while the younger Kaisiepo was travelling to West Papua. He returned to the Netherlands, where he maintained ties to Papuans and opened a dialogue with the government of Indonesia.

Kaisiepo was diagnosed with an incurable illness in 2009. He died in Amersfoort, Netherlands, on 31 January 2010, at the age of 61.
