= Theatre of Poland =

Overview of theatre in Poland

In common with other European countries, the most frequent and most popular form of theatre in Poland is dramatic theatre, based on the existence of stable artistic companies. It is above all a theatre of directors, who decide on the form of its productions and the appearance of individual scenes. There is no strict division in Poland between theatre and film directors and actors, therefore many stage artists are known to theatre goers from films of Andrzej Wajda, for example: Wojciech Pszoniak, Daniel Olbrychski, Krystyna Janda, Jerzy Radziwiłowicz, and from films of Krzysztof Kieślowski, actors such as Jerzy Stuhr, Janusz Gajos and others.

Alongside the many types of dramatic theatre whose basis is literature, there are in Poland historic forms of theatre in which spoken word is not the most important means of expression, e.g., visual theatre popular against state censorship, musical theatre, theatre of movement, etc. An equal popularity is being gained by theatres employing puppets, figures, or shadows; there is even a theatre of drawing as well as a theatre of fire.

== Tradition ==
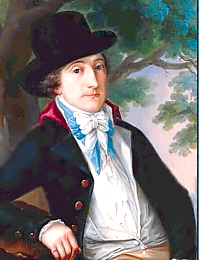
Wojciech Bogusławski (1757-1829) is regarded as the "Father of Polish theatre"

Polish dramatic theatre heavily relies on university trained actors. A tradition tracing back to 19th century players performers such as Helena Modrzejewska at its forefront, has been continued by successive generations of university trained artists. It may also be seen in the expansion of festival life and specialized publications, e.g., "Dialog", which covers international dramaturgy. Alongside the established institutions with seasoned professionals and centuries-old traditions, there are amateur theatres and travelling groups as well.

Among professional companies is the National Theatre in Warsaw. Its repertoire includes Polish and foreign dramas, which directors adapt to address contemporary topics. The theatre conducts experimental productions alongside standard stage performances. Notable are the productions of Jerzy Grzegorzewski (Theatre director between 1997 and 2002), who used stage equipment such as pantographs, large musical instruments, and props while adapting classic texts to examine their current relevance.

The National Old Theatre in Kraków is the second Polish theatre with national status and the only one in Poland belonging to the Union of European Theatres. The theatre produced works in the 1970s directed by Konrad Swinarski, Jerzy Jarocki, and Andrzej Wajda, and continues these traditions. The Old Theatre's current collaborator is Krystian Lupa. He produces the dramas and prose of German-language writers (T. Bernhardt, R.M. Rilke, R. Musil), including Broch's novel "The Sleepwalkers." He also stages Russian literature, including Dostoyevsky's "The Brothers Karamazov" and M. Bulgakov's "The Master and Margarita." Lupa's productions alter traditional action by extending tempos and focusing on situational poetic values rather than plot or conflict. This style emphasizes philosophical and existential reflection centred on the individual in a modern environment. Lupa's productions are regularly shown in Paris, where they receive attention from critics and audiences. Lupa also teaches directing at the Ludwik Solski Academy for the Dramatic Arts in Kraków, where his students include Krzysztof Warlikowski, Grzegorz Jarzyna, Maja Kleczewska, Anna Augustynowicz, Michal Zadara, and Jan Klata.

The Zbigniew Raszewski Theatre Institute is a state cultural institution in Warsaw, Poland, dedicated to documenting, organizing, and promoting Polish theatre life.

== Actors and directors ==
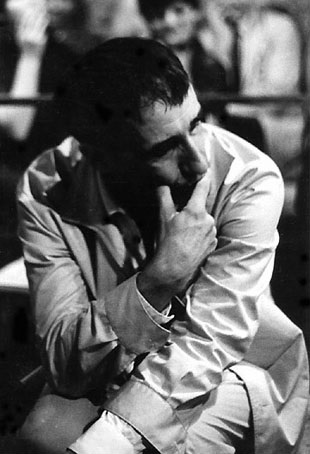
Tadeusz Kantor (1915-1990) is renowned for his revolutionary theatrical performances in Poland and abroad.

At present, the Polish theatre actor possibly best known outside the country is Andrzej Seweryn, who in the years 1984–1988 was a member of the international group formed by Peter Brook to work on the staging of the Mahabharata, and since 1993 has been linked with the Comédie Française. The most revered actor of the second half of the twentieth century in Poland is generally considered to be Tadeusz Łomnicki, who died in 1992 of a heart attack while rehearsing King Lear.

During the second half of the 1990s, there appeared in Polish dramatic theatre a new generation of young directors, who have attempted to create productions relevant to the experience and problems of a thirty-something generation brought up surrounded by mass culture, habituated to a fast-moving lifestyle, but at the same time ever more lost in the world of consumer capitalism. The leading theatre in this movement is Warsaw's TR, known as "the fastest theatre in town". Among its collaborating directors, Krzysztof Warlikowski and Grzegorz Jarzyna stand out. Warlikowski has gained international recognition with a series of innovative productions of Shakespeare, performed both at Polish theatres (The Taming of the Shrew, Hamlet) and abroad (Pericles at the Piccolo Teatro in Milan, Twelfth Night and The Tempest at the Stadt-Theater in Stuttgart). Looking for a way to present the complex existential situation of contemporary humanity, Jarzyna reaches both for contemporary drama (Witkiewicz's Tropical Madness, Gombrowicz's Princess Ivona, or Frazer's Unidentified Human Remains...) and classic European novels (Dostoyevsky's The Idiot, Mann's Doktor Faustus, directed at the Hebbel Theater in Berlin). Recently, both directors have taken an interest in the work of Sarah Kane, mounting startling productions: Cleansed (Warlikowski) and 4.48 Psychosis (Jarzyna).

=== Contemporary socio-political context ===
In the 2010s and 2020s, Polish theatre became a subject of public and political debate. Productions that critically examined the role of the Catholic Church in Poland or addressed controversial historical and social subjects occasionally faced public protests and scrutiny regarding the allocation of public funds. One notable example is the 2017 production of Klątwa (The Curse) directed by Oliver Frljić at the Powszechny Theatre in Warsaw, which generated discourse on the boundaries of artistic freedom and the responsibilities of state-subsidized cultural institutions.

The true rebirth, following the collapse of the Soviet empire, was experienced by the Ludowy Theatre in Nowa Huta district of Kraków taken over by an actor, director, and politician Jerzy Fedorowicz (1989–2005). Under his management, the theatre won considerable recognition, and numerous awards. It was twice invited to the Edinburgh International Festival: in 1996 with Macbeth directed by Jerzy Stuhr, and in 1997 with Antigone directed by Włodzimierz Nurkowski. Current director is Jacek Strama, an award-winning theatre and film producer.

== Venues ==
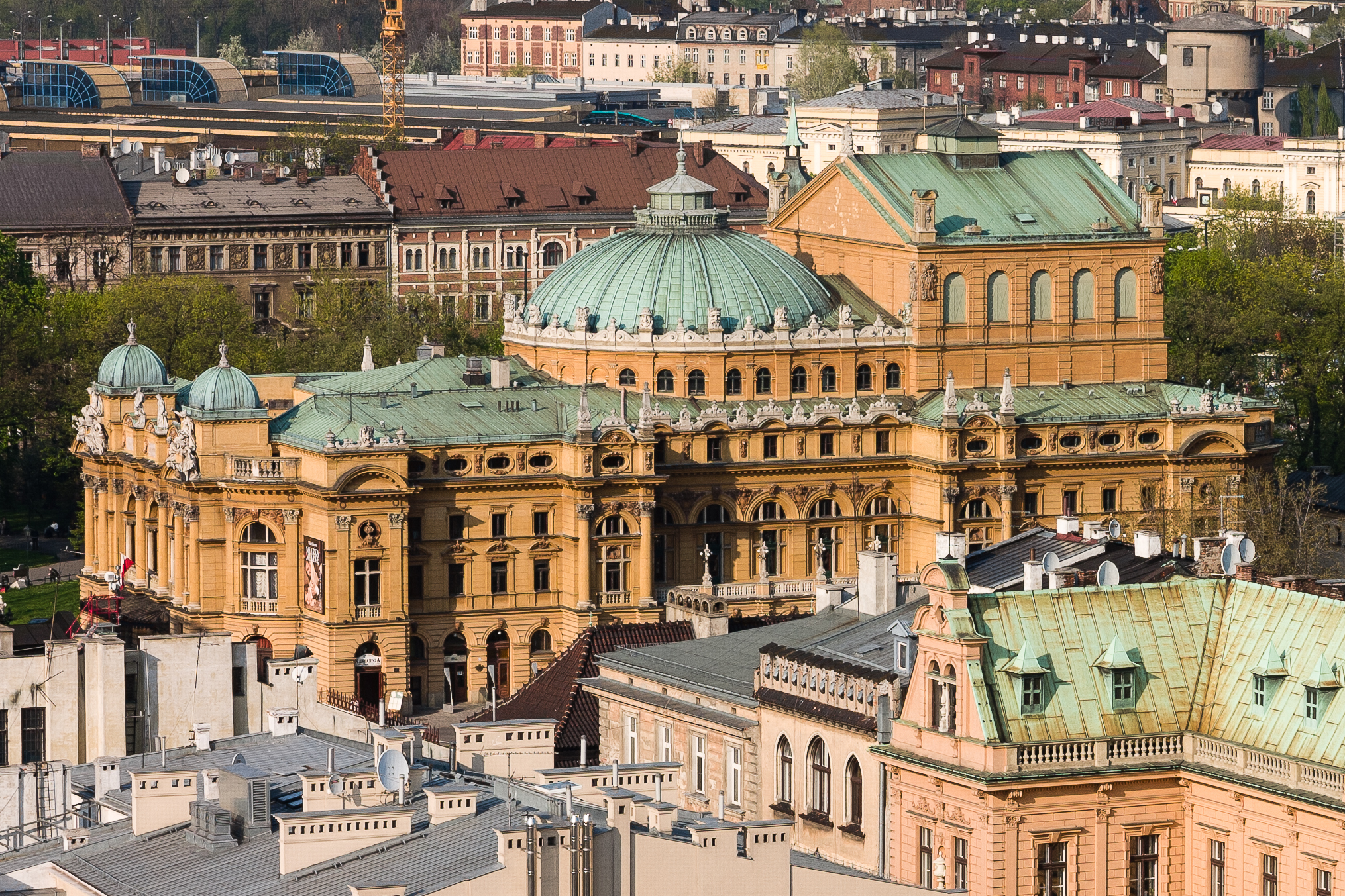
The Juliusz Słowacki Theatre in Kraków is one of Poland's premier theatre venues.

The theatrical map of Poland, on which for many years the most important points were Warsaw and Kraków, has undergone numerous changes over the last decade. The most recognized directors in Poland, such as Krzysztof Warlikowski, Grzegorz Jarzyna, Jan Klata, Michal Zadara or Maja Kleczewska work in Warsaw, but also travel to other cities. While it is true to say that the capital's position is safe, there is strong competition for second place between Kraków and Wrocław. Recognised masters (Jerzy Jarocki, Krystian Lupa) and a group of younger directors, with Piotr Cieplak and Paweł Miśkiewicz at the head, collaborate with Wrocław's theatres. Poznań, Gdańsk, and Łódź have similar ambitions. One of the more unanticipated surprises of recent seasons has been the blossoming of theatre in Legnica, a town which, until recent times, was the main Soviet military base in Poland, where the artistic director, Jacek Głomb, has been actively searching for new ways to reach the town's inhabitants. So he began putting on shows relating events in the lives of the local citizens, as well as siting classical dramas in surprising arenas (e.g., Shakespeare's Coriolanus in an old Prussian barracks). Since Pawel Lysak became the artistic director of the theatre in Bydgoszcz, this city in central Poland has been able to enjoy top-level theatre as well. This geographic expansion of theatrical activity has been supported by Ministry programs such as "Kultura w sieci" (Culture in the Network), which provide regional grants aimed at increasing the availability of professional theatre outside major metropolitan hubs.

There is no doubt that the greatest achievements of the 20th-century Polish theatre are thanks to those artists seeking new forms and functions for the theatrical arts. From the very beginning of the great European reform movement, Polish theatre people have undertaken courageous experiments in this area. The Polish stream of reform was characterised by the linking of theatre with metaphysics. The source of this type of search was the work and thinking of the Polish Romantics, with Adam Mickiewicz at the forefront. In his Forefathers' Eve, the most important work in Polish literature, there is a vision of theatre as phenomenon on the border between a show and a ceremony led by an actor. In succeeding years, the most important artists of the Polish stage referred to, and sometimes polemicized with, this vision, developing or modifying it.

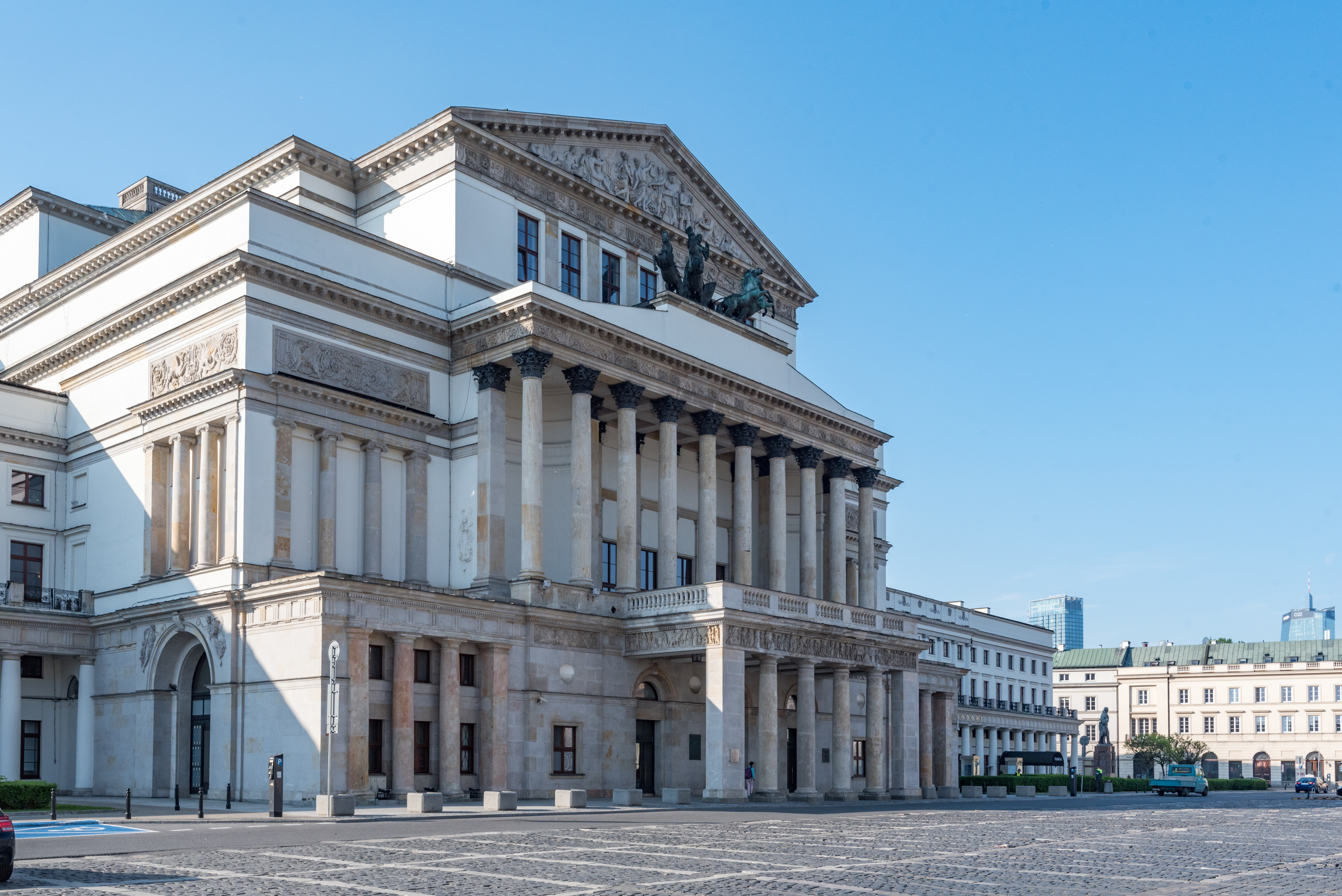
The Grand Theatre in Warsaw is among the largest theatres in Europe with a seating capacity of over 2000.

It was from this root that Stanisław Wyspiański's art arose. Poet, painter, visionary, working at the beginning of the twentieth century he influenced the development of theatre over the course of the following century. His works, born of Romantic and symbolic inspiration, conjoining Catholic, pagan, and classic traditions with the existential and political problems of the new century, has not been completely discovered and understood to this day, forming a vivid and fascinating heritage. It was to this tradition that the originators of Polish monumental theatre, Leon Schiller (Edward Gordon Craig's collaborator), Juliusz Osterwa, and Wilam Horzyca, harked back. Tadeusz Kantor, the avant-garde visual artist who became interested in theatre while trying to find new forms of expression, also alluded to it in his theatrical searches. After years of investigation (attempts to adapt the rules of Tachism and performance art to the needs of the theatre), Kantor created his own model, called the Theatre of Death. In his most famous productions - The Dead Class, Wielopole, Wielopole or I Shall Never Return - the artist presented a kind of spiritualist séance, calling pictures, words and sounds deformed by the passing of time. Referring to his memories and experiences, he portrayed a collective memory of the end of the tragic twentieth century - the century of the Holocaust.

== Jerzy Grotowski ==
Though arising from the same roots, a totally different attempt to renew theatre was undertaken by Jerzy Grotowski. Aiming for the creation of a performance as a selfless act of sacrifice, he carried out the second great reform, after Konstantin Stanisłavski's, of the actor's art, and his book Towards a Poor Theatre is still one of the most important textbooks in drama schools the world over. The productions put on by Grotowski's Theatre Laboratory, such as Acropolis (Wyspiański's drama, re-set in a concentration camp), The Constant Prince (after Calderon-Słowacki) or Apocalypsis cum figuris, are among twentieth-century world theatre's most important achievements, still points of reference for many artists. Among others, Peter Brook, Eugenio Barba, Marketa Kimbrell, Richard Schechner and Andre Gregory have derived inspiration from Grotowski's work. Over the last decade of his life, Grotowski had been investigating the possibility of creating a dramatic structure whose effect would be similar to that of a religious ceremony. After his death (1999), the work was continued by his students, Thomas Richards and Mario Biagini, leading the Workcenter, founded by Grotowski in Pontedera in Italy.

Grotowski's work has also influenced many Polish theatre artistes. Włodzimierz Staniewski, who, after some years of close collaboration with Grotowski, finally rebelled, founded the "Gardzienice" Centre for Theatrical Practice in 1977 in a small village near Lublin. Today, 25 years later, this centre is world-famous and Staniewski's method of acting, known as "theatre ecology," has been numbered among the most important of the twentieth century. The most characteristic aspect of "Gardzienice" is its treatment of theatre as one of many various cultural activities, including expeditions to areas inhabited by people holding onto folk traditions (e.g., the Eastern parts of Poland, Lemko villages or the Ukrainian Hucul region), and a strong link between art and the environment from which it arises. The productions themselves, unusually intense and filled with music, movement and dramatic singing - recall the fundamental myths of East and West. For several years, Staniewski has been particularly interested in Ancient Greece as a source of European culture and spirituality. After Apuleius' Metamorphoses (performed in Germany, the United States, the United Kingdom and Spain, among other countries) he brought into being, with "Gardzienice", a production of Eurypides' Elektra, blazing new trails in his theatrical search. From the ranks of Włodzimierz Staniewski's group have come the founders of many active and uncommonly interesting centres, and not just connected with theatre.

In Sejny, there is the Borderland Foundation, created by Krzysztof Czyżewski, a one-time Gardzienice collaborator. One of "Borderland's" forms of work is theatre (e.g., a production of S. An-sky's Dybbuk), and its aim is to raise the consciousness of the inhabitants of the borderlands regarding the unique richness of their cultural tradition, which has for centuries linked Polish, Jewish, Belarusian, Lithuanian, Ukrainian, and even Tatar influences. In common with Czyżewski, the founder of the "Music of the Eastern Lands" Foundation, Jan Bernad, also came from Gardzienice, and has devoted himself to gathering and reconstructing the rich multiethnic traditions of the ancient music from the Eastern Borders for years.

During the 1960s and 1970s, at the same time as Grotowski's work, the movement of social and politically engaged theatre was also developing in Poland. At first, it was, above all, a rebellious student theatre, later, during the period of martial law, the movement also accepted professionals, who organised productions for the underground Home Theatre. One specific form of political rebellion through theatre was promoted by Wrocław's Orange Alternative, an informal group which organised mass events poking fun at the symbols and ceremonies of officialdom. After the regaining of sovereignty in 1989, this movement weakened, but recently it has been reborn as an anticapitalist and antiwar movement. The most important centre for this kind of activity is Poznań, where, alongside the once famous and still active Theatre of the Eighth Day (the antiglobalist production Summit), the Travel Agency Theatre operates. One of its most important achievements is the open-air production Carmen Funebre, created under the influence of events in the former Yugoslavia and shown all over the world.

Another developing stream of theatre in Poland is so-called visual theatre, using pictures above all, and almost completely avoiding the spoken word. Its originator is considered to be Józef Szajna (1922), an artist whose collaboration with theatre began with stage design, went on to direction, and, since the 1970s, the creation of theatrical productions employing striking pictures referring to expressionist and surrealist aesthetics. The unique form of Szajna's theatre arose both from his artistic and personal experiences (during WWII he was a concentration camp prisoner). They were based on a vision of a deformed world in which battles are fought over the basic human values, which are constantly under threat. Szajna's most famous productions, also performed abroad, are Dante, Cervantes, and Replica, which directly relate to his traumatic wartime experiences.

During recent years in Poland, there has been a boom in musical theatre. Alongside the world-famous composers and singers, Polish directors of opera are rated ever more highly. The most important among this group has, for years, been Ryszard Peryt, collaborating with the Warsaw Chamber Opera (organising the annual Mozart Festival, among others) and the National Opera. His speciality is the production of oratorios, among which the theatrical version of Verdi's Requiem, which has been performed in Moscow's Red Square, stands out. Recent seasons have been a period of great operatic success for the film director Mariusz Treliński, who has aroused the interest of New York's Metropolitan Opera.

Critical acclaim has also been enjoyed by the opera stage designs of Andrzej Majewski. Growing popularity is also enjoyed by dance theatre. In addition to classical ballet, whose best groups have for years been linked with opera halls, contemporary dance groups have been appearing since the 1960s and 1970s. Among the most important are Poznań's Polish Theatre of Dance, founded by Conrad Drzewiecki and currently led by Ewa Wycichowska, and Wrocław's "Pantomima", founded by Henryk Tomaszewski (1919–2001). Since the 1990s, both Bytom (Silesian Dance Theatre) and Kraków have become important centres, hosting festivals which attract dancers from all over the world.

== Structural and economic model ==
Following the political transformation of 1989, the Polish theatre system underwent a structural shift. While major repertory theatres continue to receive institutional funding from the Ministry of Culture and National Heritage and local municipal governments, the post-1989 era saw the emergence of the independent theatre (teatr niezależny) sector. These ensembles typically operate without a permanent stage, relying on project-based grants from the Ministry and regional cultural centers.

== Television theatre ==
Teatr Telewizji is a program block of the public broadcaster TVP (Telewizja Polska) dedicated to broadcasting theatrical productions. Established in 1953, it airs adaptations of Polish and international drama, often featuring prominent stage and film actors.

== Festivals ==
International festivals are a particular element of Polish theatre life, occasions to allow the artistic achievements of East and West to confront each other. To this end, there are such festivals as "Contact," taking place annually in Toruń, and "Dialogue," organised biannually in autumn in Wrocław, in turn with Kraków's "Dedications" (October) and Warsaw's "Meetings" (November). Aside from these, the most interesting events are "Theatrical Confrontations" in Lublin (October), the open-air "Malta" festival in Poznań (June), Kraków's "Ballet in Spring" and the Puppet Theatre Biennial in Bielsko-Biała.

One world-famous person who had links with 20th-century Polish theatre and was Pope John Paul II. His interest in theatre dated back to his secondary school years in Wadowice, where the teenage Karol Wojtyła worked in the school theatre. During the Second World War, he co-founded, with his old teacher Mieczysław Kotlarczyk, the underground Rhapsodic Theatre, a group cultivating the Romantic tradition of live poetry. After the war, as a priest, he supported the group and was also its critic, publishing reviews of its performances. Within his literary work, John Paul II also has written a number of dramas, the best-known of which are Our God's Brother and The Jeweller's Shop.

== Witkacy Prize ==
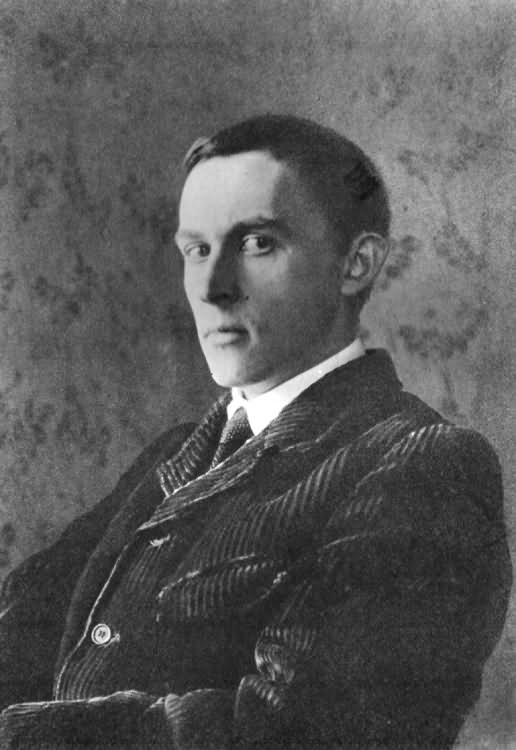
Stanisław Ignacy Witkiewicz (1885-1939)

The Stanisław Ignacy Witkiewicz (Witkacy) Prize (Polish: Nagroda im. Stanisława Ignacego Witkiewicza) is an annual award of the Polish Centre of the International Theatre Institute for the foreign (awarded by the Board of Polish Centre of the ITI) and Polish (awarded by the Critics' Circle) artists, scholars or critics for outstanding achievements in the promotion of Polish theatre throughout the world. The Prize has been given since 1983 on the occasion of the World Theatre Day.

The candidates are put up every year by the prominent people of Polish culture and the Laureates are chosen by a jury consisted of the Ministry of Culture and National Heritage representative, Zbigniew Raszewski Theatre Institute representative, Board of Polish Centre representatives and by Critics' Circle. Foreign recipient receives the original piece of art of a Polish artist and the invitation to Poland, where the stay is funded by the Ministry. During the visit, the Laureate takes part in series of meetings with Polish theatre community, organized by the Polish Centre of ITI. Usually the visit is combined with the international theatre festival in Poland.

=== Recipients ===
Some of foreign recipients:

- Daniel C. Gerould (1983)
- Roberto Bacci (1989)
- Bonnie Marranca (1990)
- Michelle Kokosowski (1991)
- Richard Demarco (1992)
- Hendrik Lindepuu (1997)
- Jacques Rosner (2002)
- Nina Kiraly (2005)
- Allen Kuharski (2006)
- Ellen Stewart (2008)
- Monique Stalens (2010)
- Manfred Beilharz (2013)
- Philip Arnoult (2014)
- Darja Dominkuš (2015)
- Richard Gough (2016).

Some of Polish recipients:

- Jerzy Jarocki (1984)
- Kazimierz Dejmek (1984)
- Jerzy Stuhr (1988)
- Tadeusz Kantor (1989)
- Józef Szajna (1992)
- Erwin Axer (1993)
- Andrzej Wajda (1995)
- Andrzej Seweryn (1996)
- Krystyna Meissner (1997)
- Krystian Lupa (2000)
- Jerzy Radziwiłowicz (2000)
- Tadeusz Bradecki (2001)
- Janusz Opryński (2002)
- Krzysztof Warlikowski (2003)
- Travel Agency Theatre (2004)
- Grzegorz Jarzyna (2005)
- Mariusz Treliński (2006)
- Ewa Wycichowska (2008)
- Song of the Goat Theatre (2010)
- Stefan Sutkowski (2013)
- Andrzej Wirth (2014)
- Janina Szarek (2015)
- Andrzej Szczytko (2016).
