= Wiesław Wójcik (actor) =

Polish actor (1946–2021)

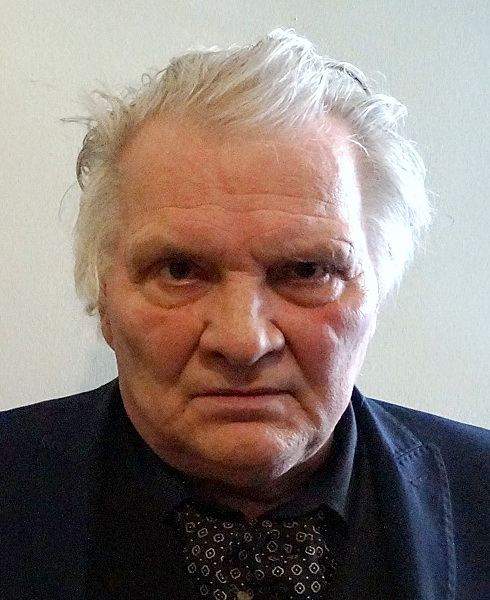
- Born: 1 October 1946; Kraków
- Died: 4 April 2021 (aged 74); Kraków
- Citizenship: Polish
- Occupation: Actor
- Years active: 1969–2019

Wiesław Wójcik (1 October 1946–4 April 2021) was a Polish theater, film and television actor.

== Biography ==
In 1969, he graduated from the State Higher School of Theatre in Kraków (PWST). He made his stage debut on 19 October 1969. He performed at the Zagłębie Theatre in Sosnowiec (1969–1970), the Rozmaitości Theatre in Kraków (1970–1971), and the Stary Theatre in Kraków (1977–1989). He has performaed in productions directed by, among others, Andrzej Wajda, Krystian Lupa and Jerzy Jarocki.

He appeared in Television Theatre productions directed by Agnieszka Holland, Kazimierz Kutz, and Andrzej Maj, among others, as well as in radio plays directed by Romana Bobrowska and Anna Polony, among others. He was buried at the Rakowicki Cemetery in Kraków.

== Filmography ==
=== Films ===
- 1974: Spacer pod psem as neighbour
- 1975: Dulscy as officer on the premises
- 1975: Znikąd donikąd
- 1975: Strach as a worker in a workers' hotel
- 1976: Man of Marble as Secretary Jodła
- 1976: The Calm as Gralak's colleague from prison met in the cinema (uncredited)
- 1977: Ciuciubabka as Piotr
- 1977: Pokój z widokiem na morze as lieutenant
- 1978: Pejzaż horyzontalny as Chrypulec
- 1978: Próba ognia i wody as Wiktor
- 1978: Seans (film) as Wiesiek
- 1978: Zielona ziemia
- 1979: Aria dla atlety as Max Braun
- 1979: Szansa (film) as warehouseman
- 1980: The Moth as Agata's friend
- 1980: Grzeszny żywot Franciszka Buły as man at the funeral of Buła's father
- 1980: Pałac as Człeczyna
- 1980: Party przy świecach as „Niuniek"
- 1981: Limuzyna Daimler-Benz as Zakapior (not credited)
- 1982: Coś się kończy as postman
- 1982: Do góry nogami as Gustlik, Gerard's father
- 1982: An Epitaph for Barbara Radziwill as a courtier mocking the dying Barbara
- 1984: Kobieta z prowincji as Tadek, Andzia's love
- 1984: Oko proroka
- 1985: Pobojowisko as Gradkowski
- 1985: Sam pośród swoich as secretary of the commune
- 1986: Komedianci z wczorajszej ulicy as Franek Zalewaja
- 1986: Pan Samochodzik i niesamowity dwór as Bigos
- 1987: Śmierć Johna L. as accordionist, husband of the barmaid Stenia
- 1988: And the Violins Stopped Playing as Bora Natkin, Zoya's father
- 1988: Kolory kochania as Jędrzej, brother-in-law of Franek Rakoczy
- 1988: Kornblumenblau as Wesołek
- 1989: Nocny gość as traveler
- 1994: Śmierć jak kromka chleba as miner
- 2003: Rzeźnik na czasie (short film)
- 2007: Katyń as postman
- 2007: Korowód as peasant
- 2007: Zamach as Wiktor

=== TV series ===
- 1976: Zaklęty dwór as butler Filip
- 1977–1978: Układ krążenia as head of the commune in Sokołówka (guest starring)
- 1978: Ślad na ziemi jako worker Dereniew, Turkawiec roommate (guest starring)
- 1979: Do krwi ostatniej as lieutenant Jerzy Raszeński (guest starring)
- 1980: Z biegiem lat, z biegiem dni… as Bronik
- 1984: Rozalka Olaboga as Jaś Mazurek's father
- 1985: Temida as police leader in Zabierzów
- 1986: Biała wizytówka as butler (guest starring)
- 1997: Złotopolscy as Leon Borowy, father of Różyczka
- 1999: Na dobre i na złe as bodyguard (guest starring)
- 2004–2008: Kryminalni as Kumor, ojciec Magdy (guest starring)
- 2008: Czas honoru as Winiarski, Roma's grandfather (guest starring)
- 2008: Giraffe and Rhino Hotel as Kulesza (guest starring)
- 2018: The Crown of the Kings as Władysław I Łokietek

=== Television Theatre ===
- 1972: Wielki testament (directed by Irena Wollen) as convict
- 1978: Lorenzaccio (directed by Laco Adamík, Agnieszka Holland) as officer
- 1980: Blisko serca (directed by Ryszard Bugajski) as Tomooy
- 1980: Żegnaj, Judaszu (directed by Jolanta Słobodzian) as Piotr
- 1981: Pustelnia (directed by Wojciech Solarz) as Bruno
- 1984: Granica (directed by Jan Błeszyński) as Borbocki
- 1985: Wesele (directed by Antoni Zajączkowski)
- 1987: Trąd w pałacu sprawiedliwości (directed by Andrzej Maj) as officer
- 1987: Kopciuszek (directed by Andrzej Maj) as Herald
- 1988: Makbet (directed by Krzysztof Nazar) as doorman
- 1889: Samobójca (directed by Kazimierz Kutz)
- 1989: Dzieci Arbatu (directed by Kazimierz Kutz)
- 1990: Minna von Barnhelm (directed by Andrzej Maj) as Just
- 1990: Spadkobiercy (directed by Andrzej Maj)
- 2006: Volpone (directed by Grzegorz Warchoł) as judge

Source.

== Theatre ==
- 1968: Klatka czyli Zabawa rodzinna (Ludwik Solski State Theatre School, directed by Jerzy Kaliszewski) as Staś
- 1969: Człowiek z budki suflera (Zagłębie Theatre in Sosnowiec, directed by Maryna Broniewska) as Henryk
- 1970: Spoza gór i rzek (Zagłębie Theatre in Sosnowiec, directed by Wiesław Mirecki) as Piekut
- 1970: Mistrz Pathelin (Zagłębie Theatre in Sosnowiec, directed by Wiesław Mirecki) as burgher
- 1970: Przedwiośnie (Rozmaitości Theatre in Kraków, directed by Józef Wyszomirski) as sailor, student III
- 1970: Królowa przedmieścia (Rozmaitości Theatre in Kraków, directed by Jerzy Ukleja) as Szymon, Smutny, Organ grinder, Student, Szymon
- 1971: Chłopi (Rozmaitości Theatre in Kraków, directed by Wanda Wróblewska) as Witek
- 1971: Barillon się żeni! (Rozmaitości Theatre in Kraków, directed by Halina Gryglaszewska) as Patryk Surcouf
- 1972: Żółta ciżemka (Rozmaitości Theatre in Kraków, directed by Maria Billiżanka) as Grzegorz Kuglarz, Journeyman Kacper
- 1973: Kariera Artura Ui (Rozmaitości Theatre in Kraków, directed by Mieczysław Górkiewicz) as announcer, accused Fish
- 1973: Szkoła żon (Bagatela Theatre in Kraków, directed by Mieczysław Górkiewicz) jako notary's assistant
- 1977: ...Państwo Ulianoff przybyli do Krakowa... (Stary Theatre in Kraków, directed by Jerzy Święch) as policeman
- 1978: Z biegiem lat, z biegiem dni... (Stary Theatre in Kraków, directed by Andrzej Wajda, Anna Polony)
- 1979: Sen o Bezgrzesznej (Stary Theatre in Kraków, directed by Jerzy Jarocki) as bricklayer, soldier
- 1980: Romans z wodewilu (Stary Theatre in Kraków, directed by Marta Stebnicka) as Franek
- 1980: Rewizor (Stary Theatre in Kraków, directed by Jerzy Jarocki) as Miszka
- 1981: Powrót Odysa (Stary Theatre in Kraków, directed by Krystian Lupa) as Ktesippos
- 1981: Aktorzy Teatru Starego w scenach i monologach z „Hamleta" (Stary Teatr im. Heleny Modrzejewskiej w Krakowie, directed by Andrzej Wajda) as Gravedigger II
- 1981: Tragiczna historia Hamleta księcia Danii (Stary Theatre in Kraków, directed by Andrzej Wajda) as Gravedigger I, Courtier
- 1982: Oresteja (Stary Theatre in Kraków, directed by Zygmunt Hübner) as One of the choir of the Elders of Argos
- 1983: Maria (Stary Theatre in Kraków, directed by Edward Lubaszenko) as Orłow
- 1984: Antygona (Stary Theatre in Kraków, directed by Andrzej Wajda) as Guardian
- 1985: Gyubal Wahazar, czyli na przełęczach bezsensu (Stary Theatre in Kraków, directed by Romana Próchnicka) as Baron Oskar van den Binden Gnumben
- 1985: Mistrz Piotr Pathelin (Stary Theatre in Kraków, directed by Jan Güntner) as Wilhelmina, Rajca-Ławnik
- 1986: Termopile Polskie (Stary Theatre in Kraków, directed by Krzysztof Babicki) as Lejba
- 1987: Legenda (Stary Theatre in Kraków, directed by Krystian Jankowski) as Aquarius
- 1988: Don Juan albo Kamienny Gość (Stary Theatre in Kraków, directed by Yves Goulais) as Guzman
- 1989: Słuchaj, Izraelu! (Stary Theatre in Kraków, directed by Jerzy Jarocki) as Tenor Słowik, Passerby II, Hassid
- 2001: Jak wam się podoba (Ludwik Solski State Theatre School, directed by Andrzej Wajda) as Adam

Source.

== Radio ==
- 1978: Z biegiem lat, z biegiem dni (Polish Radio Theatre, directed by Romana Bobrowska, Anna Polony), episodes 2, 3, 4, 6
- 1979: Ostatni lot Halifaxa (Polish Radio Theatre, directed by Romana Bobrowska, Anna Polony), episodes 3, 4
- 1980: Maratończycy (Polish Radio Theatre, directed by Aleksander Bednarz) as Proś
