= Krystyna Szczepańska =

Polish stage and costume designer (born 1950)

- Born: 18 August 1950 (age 75); Kraków
- Citizenship: Polish
- Education: Stage designer, costume designer

Krystyna Szczepańska (born 18 August 1950) is a Polish stage and costume designer.

== Biography ==
She was born in Kraków as a second child of Piotr Szczepański, a lawyer and graduate of Jan Kazimierz University, and Stanisława née Żółtańska, teacher of Russian language. Her parents came from Berezhany; they both acted as members of the Home Army. Krystyna's elder sister Alicja is a lawyer.

Szczepańska was married to director Andrzej Maj and she mainly designed sets and costumes for his performances.

Their daughter Magdalena is a costume and set designer active mostly in the advertising industry. Szczepańska's second daughter is Elizabeth.

Szczepańska emigrated to Vancouver.

== Filmography ==
Set designer

- 1981: My wciąż spieszący (TV play)
- 1981: Kocham cię za to, że cię kochać muszę (TV play)
- 1982: Znana nasza (TV play)
- 1982: Milczeć pogodnie (TV play)
- 1983: Droga do Czarnolasu (TV play)
- 1984: Wiersze i krajobrazy (TV performance)
- 1984: Piękność z Amherst (TV play)
- 1984: Obszar swobody (TV play)
- 1985: Nad wodą wielką i czystą (TV play)
- 1986: Twarze Witkacego czyli regulamin firmy portretowej (TV play)
- 1986: Dwie wigilie (TV film)
- 1987: Trąd w pałacu sprawiedliwości (TV play)
- 1987: Harnasie (TV film)
- 1988: Dzieje kultury polskiej (educational film)
- 1991: Koty? Koty! (TV play)

Costume designer

- 1985: Nad wodą wielką i czystą (TV play)
- 1987: Harnasie (TV film)

Interior decoration

- 1988: Kornblumenblau

== Theatre ==
Stage designer

- 1979: Niebezpieczne związki (directed by Andrzej Maj, Ludwik Solski Theatre, Tarnów)
- 1982: Jednorożec z gwiazd (directed by Andrzej Maj, Stefan Jaracz Theatre, Łódź)
- 1982: Historia, czyli tu wcale nie chodzi o Mozarta (directed by Andrzej Maj, Stefan Jaracz Theatre)

Decoration

- 1983: Ozimina (directed by Andrzej Maj, Stefan Jaracz Theatre)

Costume designer

- 1985: Pornografia (directed by Andrzej Maj, Stefan Jaracz Theatre)
