= Mariusz Treliński =

Polish opera, theatre and film director (born 1962)

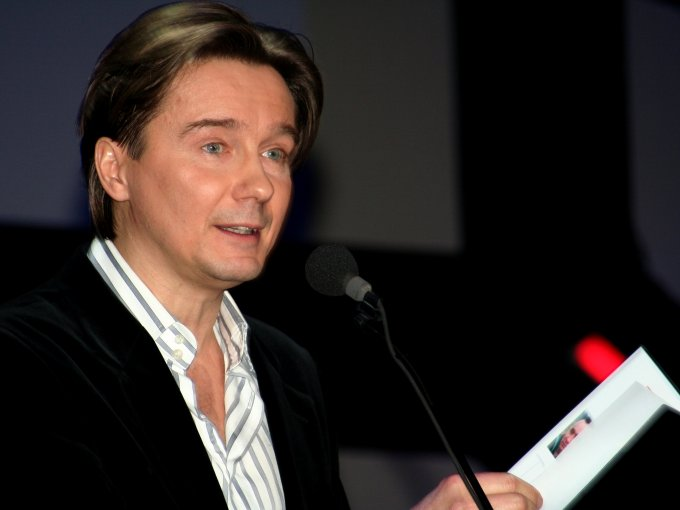
- Treliński in 2005
- Born: March 28, 1962 (age 63); Warsaw, Poland
- Education: National Film School, Łódź
- Occupations: opera director, theatre director, film director
- Years active: 1987-present
- Awards: International Opera Award (2018); Knight's Cross of the Order of Polonia Restituta (2013); Cyprian Kamil Norwid Award (2003); Witkacy Prize - Critics' Circle Award (2006); Paszport Polityki (2001)

Mariusz Treliński (born 28 March 1962, Warsaw) is a Polish opera, theatre and film director as well as the artistic director of the Grand Theatre in Warsaw.

== Life and career ==
He studied film direction at the National Film School in Łódź, which he graduated from in 1986. He made his film debut in 1987 by directing the film Zad wielkiego wieloryba based on the screenplay that he co-wrote with Janusz Wróblewski. His next feature film Pożegnanie jesieni ("Farewell To Autumn", 1990), which was an adaptation of the novel by Stanisław Ignacy Witkiewicz, was screened at the 47th Venice International Film Festival where he won an award for best debut. In 1995, he directed the film Łagodna for which he received the Journalists' Award at the 20th Gdynia Film Festival. In 2000, he directed the film Egoiści ("The Egoists").

In 1995, he made his opera debut by directing the opera Wyrywacz serc ("The Heartsnatcher") by Elżbieta Sikora based on the works of Boris Vian at the Warsaw Autumn Festival hosted by the Grand Theatre in Warsaw. In 1999, he directed Puccini's Madama Butterfly with the stage design by Boris Kudlička with whom he started his artistic cooperation. Since then, he has been regarded as one of the most original as well as controversial opera directors in Poland. In 2001, his production of Madama Butterfly was staged at the Washington Opera at the special request by Placido Domingo.

Treliński was awarded the 2006 Witkacy Prize - Critics' Circle Award. Since May 2005 to August 2006 he served as the artistic director of the Grand Theatre in Warsaw. In 2006, he directed there another opera by Puccini La bohème. In 2007, he directed Karol Szymanowski's King Roger at the Wrocław Opera. In March 2011, he was again appointed as the director of the Warsaw's Grand Theatre.

In 2013, he became the recipient of the Knight's Cross of the Order of Polonia Restituta for his achievements as an opera director. In 2016, his production of Tristan und Isolde by Wagner opened the Metropolitan Opera season in New York. In 2018, he won the International Opera Award.

== Personal life ==
He married and later divorced Monika Donner with whom he has a son Piotr. He was in a relationship with dancer and model Edyta Herbuś.

In 2010 and 2015, he became one of members of the committee supporting Bronisław Komorowski in Poland's presidential elections.

== Selected works ==
=== Films ===
- Film o pankach (1983)
- Zad wielkiego wieloryba (1987)
- Farewell to Autumn (Pożegnanie jesieni, 1990)
- Łagodna (1995)
- Egoiści (2000)

=== Operas ===
- Wyrywacz serc by Elżbieta Sikora – Grand Theatre, Warsaw, (1995)
- Madama Butterfly by Giacomo Puccini – Grand Theatre, Warsaw (1999), Washington National Opera (2001), Mariinsky Theatre, Sankt Petersburg (2005), Israel Opera (2008)
- King Roger by Karol Szymanowski – Grand Theatre, Warsaw (2000)
- Otello by Giuseppe Verdi – Grand Theatre, Warsaw (2001)
- Eugene Onegin by Peter Tchaikovsky – Grand Theatre, Warsaw (2002)
- Don Giovanni by Wolfgang Amadeus Mozart – Grand Theatre, Warsaw (2002), Los Angeles Opera (2003), Wrocław Opera (2011)
- The Queen of Spades by Peter Tchaikovsky – Berlin State Opera (2003), Grand Theatre, Warsaw (2004), Łódź Grand Theatre (2010), Israel Opera (2010)
- Andrea Chénier by Umberto Giordano – Poznań Grand Theatre (2004), Washington National Opera (2004), Grand Theatre, Warsaw (2005)
- La bohème by Giacomo Puccini – Grand Theatre, Warsaw (2006)
- King Roger by Karol Szymanowski (new version) – Wrocław Opera (2007)
- Orfeo ed Euridice by Christoph Willibald Gluck – Slovak National Theater, Bratislava (2008), Grand theatre, Warsaw (2009), Israel Opera (2012)
- Aleko by Sergei Rachmaninoff and Iolanta by Peter Tchaikovsky – Mariinsky Theatre in Sankt Petersburg co-produced with Baden-Baden Opera (2009)
- La Traviata by Giuseppe Verdi – Grand Theatre, Warsaw (2010)
- Turandot by Giacomo Puccini – Grand Theatre, Warsaw (2010)
- The Flying Dutchman by Richard Wagner – Grand Theatre, Warsaw (2012)
- Manon Lescaut by Giacomo Puccini – Grand Theatre, Warsaw co-produced with La Monnaie in Brussels and Welsh National Opera in Cardiff (2012)
- Boris Godunov by Modest Mussorgsky – Lithuanian National Opera and Ballet Theatre, Vilnius (2013)
- Eugene Onegin by Peter Tchaikovsky – Teatro Comunale di Bologna, Bologna (2014)
- Salome by Richard Strauss – Prague State Opera, Prague (2015)
- Tristan und Isolde by Richard Wagner – Metropolitan Opera, New York City (2016)
- Tristan und Isolde by Richard Wagner – National Centre for the Performing Arts, Beijing (2017)
- Halka by Stanisław Moniuszko – Theater an der Wien, Vienna (2019)

=== Theatre productions ===
- Lautréamont-Sny based on Les Chants de Maldoror – Teatr Studio in Warsaw (1992)
- Natalia by Fyodor Dostoevsky – Teatr Telewizji (1995)
- The Spider by Hans Everest – Teatr Telewizji (1995)
- Macbeth by William Shakespeare – Teatr Powszechny in Warsaw (1996)
- Adrianne Lecouvreur by Augustina E. Scribe and Ernest Legouvé – Teatr Telewizji (1997)

== See also ==
- Polish opera
- International Opera Awards
