= Piotr Skiba (actor) =

Polish actor and costume designer (born 1954)

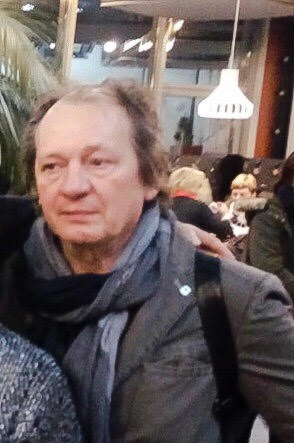
- Piotr Skiba, 2018
- Born: 4 May 1954 (age 72); Kalisz
- Citizenship: Polish
- Occupation: Actor
- Partner: Krystian Lupa

Piotr Skiba (born 4 May 1954) is an actor and costume designer.

== Biography ==
In 1978 he graduated in acting from the Łódź Film School.

After graduating, he joined the Cyprian Kamil Norwid Theatre in Jelenia Góra. From 1980 to 1998, he was a member of the ensemble of the Stary Theatre in Kraków. From 1998 to 2012, he was an actor at the Dramatyczny Theatre in Warsaw, and from 2013 to 2016, he was an actor at the Polish Theatre in Wrocław.

His life partner has been Krystian Lupa. Twice he won award for best actor at the Boska Komedia Festival.

== Filmography ==
- Zielona miłość (1978), TV series, as Wojtek, hospital's patient
- Kornblumenblau (1988) as Włodek
- Historia niemoralna (1990) as Krzyś
- Farewell to Autumn (1990) as Zelisław Smorski
- Odwiedź mnie we śnie (1996) as chief in heaven
- The Lure (2015)
- Fuga (2018) as Michał
- Dziura w głowie (2018) as pop
- Algorytmika (2022) as father of the boy
