= Strašice (Strakonice District) =

- Municipality
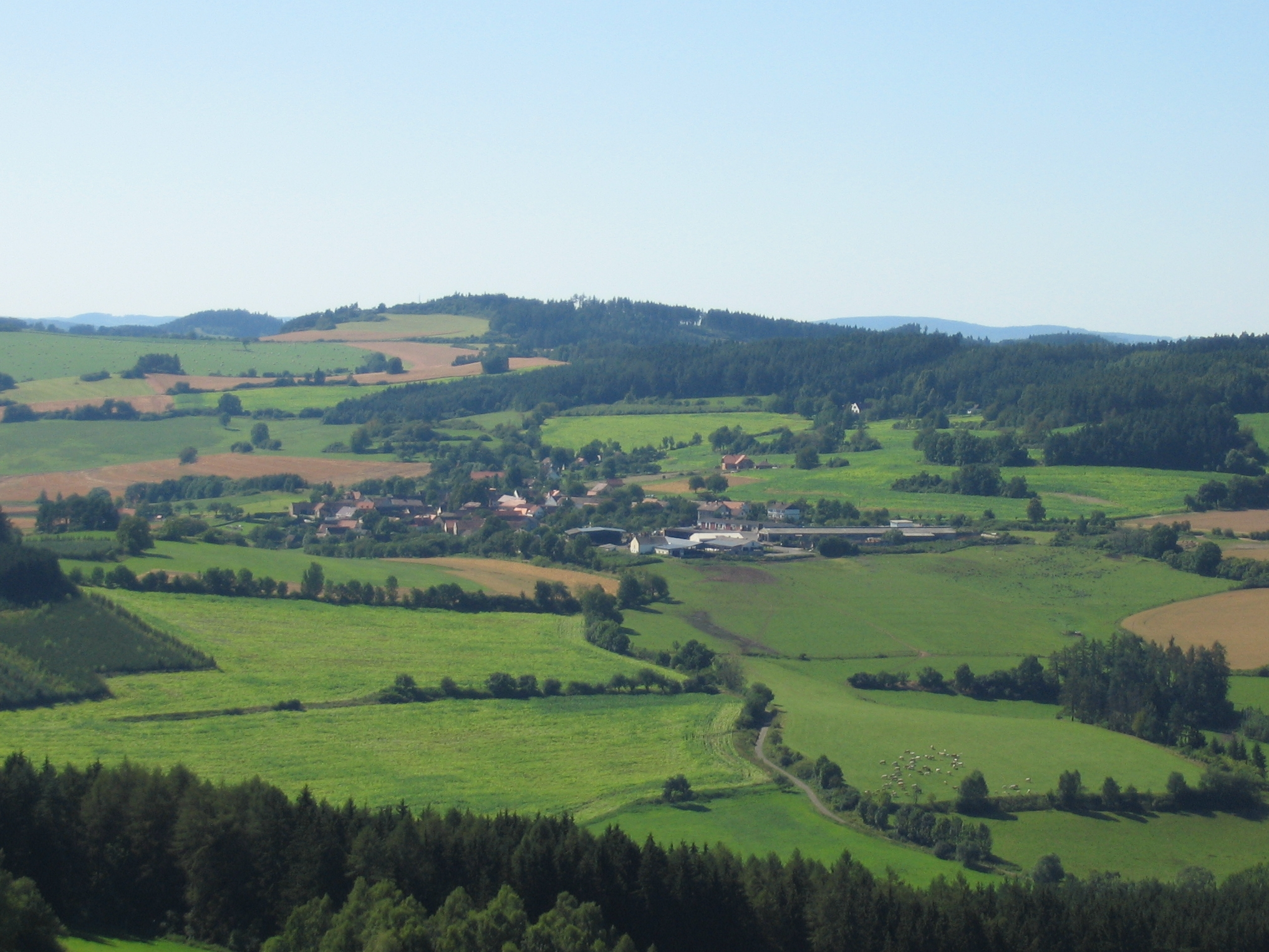
- View from the southeast

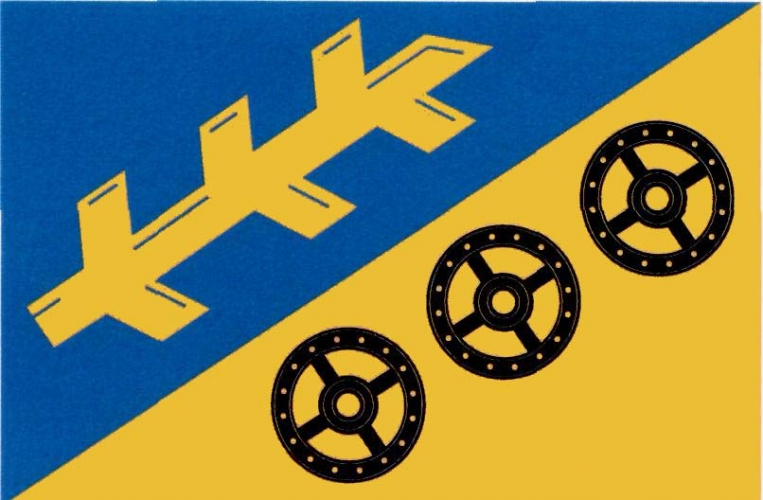
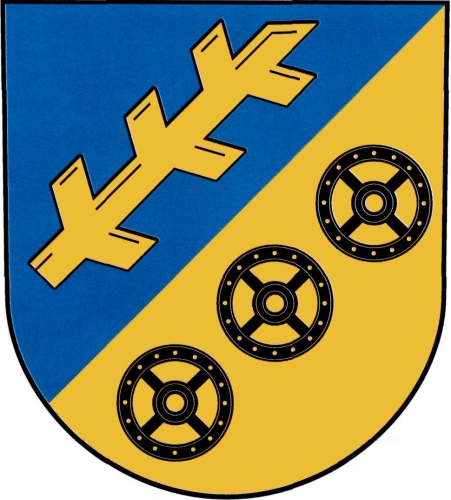
- Flag Coat of arms

- Location in the Czech Republic
- Coordinates: 49°12′9″N 13°43′47″E
- Country: Czech Republic
- Region: South Bohemian
- District: Strakonice
- First mentioned: 1365

Area
  - Total: 8.13 km^{2} (3.14 sq mi)
- Elevation: 585 m (1,919 ft)

Population (2026-01-01)
  - Total: 174
  - Density: 21.4/km^{2} (55.4/sq mi)
- Time zone: UTC+1 (CET)
  - Summer (DST): UTC+2 (CEST)
- Postal code: 387 16
- Website: obecstrasice.cz

Strašice is a municipality and village in Strakonice District in the South Bohemian Region of the Czech Republic. It has about 200 inhabitants.

Strašice lies approximately 14 kilometres (9 mi) south-west of Strakonice, 60 km (37 mi) north-west of České Budějovice, and 110 km (68 mi) south-west of Prague.

== Administrative division ==
Strašice consists of two municipal parts (in brackets population according to the 2021 census):

- Strašice (114)
- Škůdra (52)

== Etymology ==
The name is derived from the personal name Strach, meaning "the village of Strach's people".

== Demographics ==
Historical population
Year	Pop.	±%
1869	621	—
1880	682	+9.8%
1890	632	−7.3%
1900	633	+0.2%
1910	597	−5.7%
1921	615	+3.0%
1930	524	−14.8%
1950	377	−28.1%
1961	367	−2.7%
1970	311	−15.3%
1980	246	−20.9%
1991	221	−10.2%
2001	201	−9.0%
2011	188	−6.5%
2021	166	−11.7%
Source: Censuses
