= Things I Didn't Throw Out =

2017 memoir by Marcin Wicha

Things I Didn't Throw Out (Polish: Rzeczy, których nie wyrzuciłem) is a 2017 Polish memoir by Polish writer and graphic designer Marcin Wicha. The book won the Nike Literary Award in 2018 and the 2018 Paszport Polityki for literature.
