= Alina Obidniak =

Polish theatre director and actress (1931–2021)

- Born: 29 June 1931; Krosno, Poland
- Died: 29 October 2021 (aged 90); Jelenia Góra, Poland
- Education: Ludwik Solski Academy of Dramatic Art; Gerasimov Institute of Cinematography; National Film School in Łódź
- Occupations: stage director, actress
- Years active: 1961-2010
- Honours: Order of Polonia Restituta Gold Cross of Merit (Poland) Gold Medal for Merit to Culture – Gloria Artis Medal of Commission of National Education

Alina Obidniak (29 June 1931 – 29 October 2021) was a Polish theatre director and actress.

== Life ==
Graduate of acting at the Ludwik Solski Academy of Dramatic Arts in Kraków, and film directing at the National Film School in Łódź and Gerasimov Institute of Cinematography in Moscow in the class of Alexander Dovzhenko.

Obidniak was an artistic director of the Wojciech Bogusławski Theatre in Kalisz (1964-1970) and Cyprian Kamil Norwid Theatre in Jelenia Góra (1973-1988, 2000), where she invited many renowned theatre directors including Krystian Lupa, Henryk Tomaszewski, Adam Hanuszkiewicz and Jean-Marie Pradier. In 1978 theatre critics awarded the Norwid Theatre at Théâtre des Nations Festival in Caracas. In 1983 she organised an early Festival of Street Theatre in Jelenia Góra.

Since the 1950s, she has been a close friend and confidant of fellow theatre director Jerzy Grotowski. In 1995, Obidniak received the title of Polish "Woman of Europe" from European Commission.
