= The Calm (film) =

- Theatrical release poster
- Directed by: Krzysztof Kieślowski
- Screenplay by: Krzysztof Kieślowski; Jerzy Stuhr
- Story by: Lech Borski
- Produced by: Zbigniew Romatowski
- Starring: Jerzy Stuhr; Izabella Olszewska; Jerzy Trela
- Cinematography: Jacek Petrycki
- Edited by: Maria Szymańska
- Music by: Piotr Figiel
- Distributed by: Polish Television
- Release date: 19 September 1980 (Poland)
- Running time: 70 minutes
- Country: Poland
- Language: Polish

The Calm (Polish: Spokój) is a film by Polish director Krzysztof Kieślowski made in 1976 but not exhibited until broadcast on Polish television in 1980. It starred Jerzy Stuhr, Izabella Olszewska, and Jerzy Trela. Based on a story by Lech Borski and a screenplay by Kieślowski and Jerzy Stuhr, the film is about a young man who leaves prison after a three-year sentence seeking to start a new life. His dreams of a better life are broken, however, when he is forced into a conflict between a corrupt construction company boss and his fellow workers who go on strike. The Calm was filmed on location in Kraków and completed in 1976, but was banned by the state because of its subject matter—strikes were illegal in Poland during that time. (Note: Kieślowski claimed that the film "had nothing to do with politics. It simply tells the story of a man who wants very little and can't get it.") The film was finally shown on Polish television for the first time on 19 September 1980. In 1981, The Calm received the Polish Film Festival Special Jury Prize.

== Plot ==
A young man in Poland, Antek Gralak (Jerzy Stuhr), is released from prison after serving a three-year sentence. Leaving his home town of Kraków, Antek heads for a construction site in Silesia where he is not known. He dreams of living a simple life, with a job, a wife, and home. In Silesia he is anxious to avoid trouble and is friendly with his colleagues and grateful to his employer for hiring him.

Antek meets a nice young woman, falls in love, and gets married. His joyful new life is soon interrupted, however, when he becomes involved in a conflict at work. Construction materials have disappeared and Antek's boss, who is involved in the theft, deducts the loss from the workers' wages. Thinking he can trust Antek, the boss tries to get him involved in his underhanded deals.

Soon a strike breaks out among the workers. Torn between his boss and his coworkers, Antek, who is only interested in finding peace, shows up for work. Believing Antek to be in league with their corrupt boss, the striking workers beat him up as he mutters, "Calm ... calm ..."

== Cast ==
- Jerzy Stuhr as Antek Gralak
- Izabella Olszewska
- Jerzy Trela
- Jan Adamski
- Marian Cebulski
- Edward Dobrzanski
- Ryszard Dreger
- Jerzy Fedorowicz
- Wiesław Wójcik
- Stanislaw Gronkowski
- Elzbieta Karkoszka
- Stanislaw Marczewski
- Stefan Mienicki
- Jan Nizinski
- Ryszard Palik
- Danuta Ruksza
- Janusz Sykutera
- Feliks Szajnert
- Michal Szulkiewicz
- Grzegorz Warchol
- Ferdynand Wójcik
- Michal Zarnecki

== Reception ==
=== Awards and nominations ===
- 1981 Polish Film Festival Special Jury Prize (Krzysztof Kieslowski) Won
