= Teatr Biuro Podróży =

Polish theatre company

Teatr Biuro Podróży (Travel Agency Theatre) is an alternative theatre company based in Poznań, Poland. Founded by Paweł Szkotak in 1988. This Polish theatre ensemble creates and performs large-scale, outdoor theatre on social and political themes, using gestures, physical actions, visual spectacles, music, and minimal texts. The company tours regularly and has performed in fifty countries.

== Projects ==
- Theatre without Boundaries – a theatre project whose aim is to present the work of Teatr Biuro Podróży in areas of heightened political and social tensions. 2008: work with Palestinian refugees in Bourj el Barajneh camp in southern Beirut and the presentation of "Carmen Funebre". 2008: research journey to Cuba and the presentation of "Pigs". 2009: tour in the West Bank: Bethlehem, Ramallah, Jenin with the performance of "Carmen Funebre". Meetings and barters with local communities.
- "Maski" Theater Festival, annually from 1997. Because of its social-political profile it promotes the "engaged theatre" and the performances that diagnose the condition of the contemporary human being concerning the reality and facts.
- International Theatre Project "Facing the Zone" dedicated to the Chernobyl disaster, created in collaboration with Belarusian and Ukrainian partners. A journey across the contaminated zone in Belarus and Ukraine. Meetings with people who still live in the radioactive areas. A visit in Chernobyl nuclear plant and deserted city of Pripyat. Premiered in November/December 2006. Supported by the European Cultural Foundation.
- Theatre workshops and master classes are inseparable parts of the company's activity and are run by the actors of Teatr Biuro Podróży. This strictly theatrical education project consists is mainly in demonstration and teaching of different acting techniques. Teatr Biuro Podróży's workshops were organized in the United States, the United Kingdom, Ireland, Iran, Germany, Russia, Belarus, Ukraine, Poland and Lebanon.

The group's most famous piece, Carmen Funebre (Funeral Song), is based on interviews with victims of the Balkan wars. Developed in 1993–1994, Carmen Funebre continues to tour internationally, including performances in the United States in 2002 and in the United Kingdom in 2007. Carmen Funebre was awarded Fringe First (1995), the Critic's Award (1995) and the Hamada Award (1996) at the Edinburgh Fringe Festival.

The ensemble's production, HofD (Heart of Darkness) premiered in London in the summer of 2007 at the National Theatre's outdoor festival, Watch This Space.

They have a strong relationship with the National Theatre in London, performing there every summer as part of the National's summer festival 2004–2010.

== Productions (1989–2007) ==
- Einmal ist keinmal, 1989
- The Gentle End of Death, 1990
- Giordano, 1992
- Carmen Funebre, 1993–1994
- Not of Us, 1997
- Drink Vinegar Gentlemen, 1998
- Moonsailors, 1999
- Millennium Mysteries, 2000
- Manuscript by Alfonso van Worden, 2001
- Eclypse, 2003
- Pigs, 2003
- MacBeth: Who is that Bloodied Man?, 2005
- Facing the Zone, in collaboration with EcodomArt (Belarus) and Arabeski Teatr (Ukraine), 2006
- HofD (Heart of Darkness), 2007

== Awards ==
- Fringe First (Carmen Funebre, Edinburgh 1995)
- Critics` Award (Carmen Funebre, Edinburgh 1995)
- Hamada Award (Carmen Funebre, Edinburgh 1996)
- Medal of Young Art (Poznan, 1995)
- The Public Award (Carmen Funebre, Erlangen 1996)
- The-Best-Director Award (Drink Vinegar, Gentlemen Tarnow 1998)
- The-Best-Scenography Award (Carmen Funebre, Cairo, 2001)
- The Ministry of Foreign Affairs Award (Warsaw, 2002)
- The Ministry of Culture Award (Warsaw, 2002)
- Witkacy Prize - Critics' Circle Award (Poland 2004)
- Paszport Polityki for Pawel Szkotak (Warsaw 2005)
- "Theatre For All" Award at 23 Fadjr Theatre Festival (Tehran, 2005)
- The-Best-Script Award for Pawel Szkotak for Pigs (Tarnów, 2005)
- The-Best-Director Award for Paweł Szkotak for Macbeth (Tehran 2008)
- Paweł Szkotak, Marta Strzałko, Jaroslaw Siejkowski awarded "Gloria Artis" Medals by Ministry of Culture and National Heritage (Warsaw, 2008)
- Grand Prix at the International Street Theatre Festival in Athens for Carmen Funebre (Athens 2009)

== Paweł Szkotak, founder ==
Born in 1965, Szkotak was educated at Adam Mickiewicz University (Poznan, Poland). In addition to leading Teatr Biuro Podróży, he is also the artistic director of Polski Teatr in Poznan, which was named one of the best repertory theatres in Poland by Teatr magazine in 2004. He is also director of the Maski Festival of experimental theatre in Poznan. He has been granted over a dozen awards for his work, including the prestigious Passport award from Polityka magazine (2004), presented to outstanding Polish artists that represent Poland abroad.
