= Dominika Słowik =

Polish writer

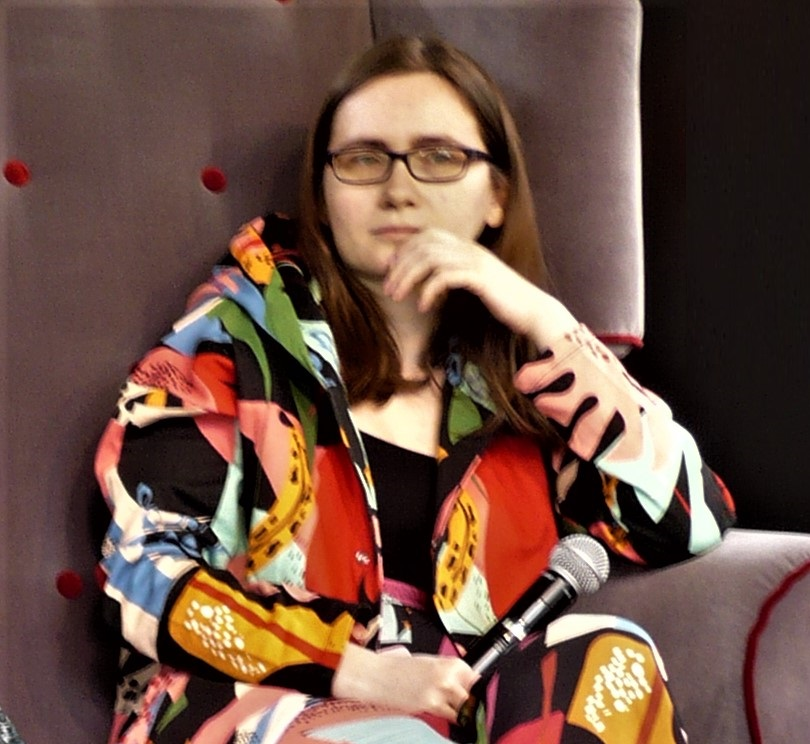
- Born: 10 September 1988 (age 37) Jaworzno, Poland
- Occupation: Fiction writer
- Citizenship: Poland
- Notable works: Zimowla

Dominika Słowik (born 1988) is a Polish writer. Her novel Zimowla brought her the Paszport Polityki 2019 award.

== Early life and education ==
Dominika Słowik was born on 10 September 1988, in Jaworzno, where she completed her primary and secondary education. She then studied Spanish philology at the College of Interdisciplinary Individual Studies in Humanities and Social Sciences of Jagiellonian University.

== Career ==
Słowik debuted in 2015 with a novel Atlas: Doppelganger. The book tells the story of a childhood set during the post-1989 transformation era Poland, where the crumbling apartment blocks form a mythical literary scenery. Literary critic Justyna Sobolewska wrote in a review that the opening of the novel contained "one of the best depictions of apartment blocks ever written". Atlas: Doppelganger was shortlisted for the Gdynia Literary Prize.

In 2019, Słowik published her second novel, Zimowla: a multilayered coming-of-age story set in a fictitious, small provincial Polish town. Its narrative core is set in 2005, but the history of various characters and the region itself is key to the story which reflects the complex past of Poland. Słowik borrows from a variety of literary conventions, using elements of young adult adventure novels, thrillers, grotesque and magic realism to give nuance to her storytelling. She worked on the book, in part, during a Prague City of Literature creative residency program. The novel brought Słowik the Paszport Polityki award and the Odkrycie roku ("breakthrough of the year") prize awarded by Onet.pl. Zimowla was also named the Kraków Book of the Month in January 2020.

In 2021, Słowik published her first collection of short stories, Samosiejki, characterized by the elements of the unknown or bizarre interwoven into otherwise common settings. In 2023, an excerpt of the collection appeared in English translation by Jess Jensen Mitchell in Two Lines Journal.

Słowik lives in Kraków.

== Works ==
=== Novels ===
- Atlas: Doppelganger, 2015
- Zimowla, 2019
- Rybie oko, 2024

=== Short stories ===
- Sanatorium, short story for O_KA literary project, 2016
- Samosiejki, short story collection, 2021
