= Stefan Jaracz Theatre =

Theatre in Łódz, Poland

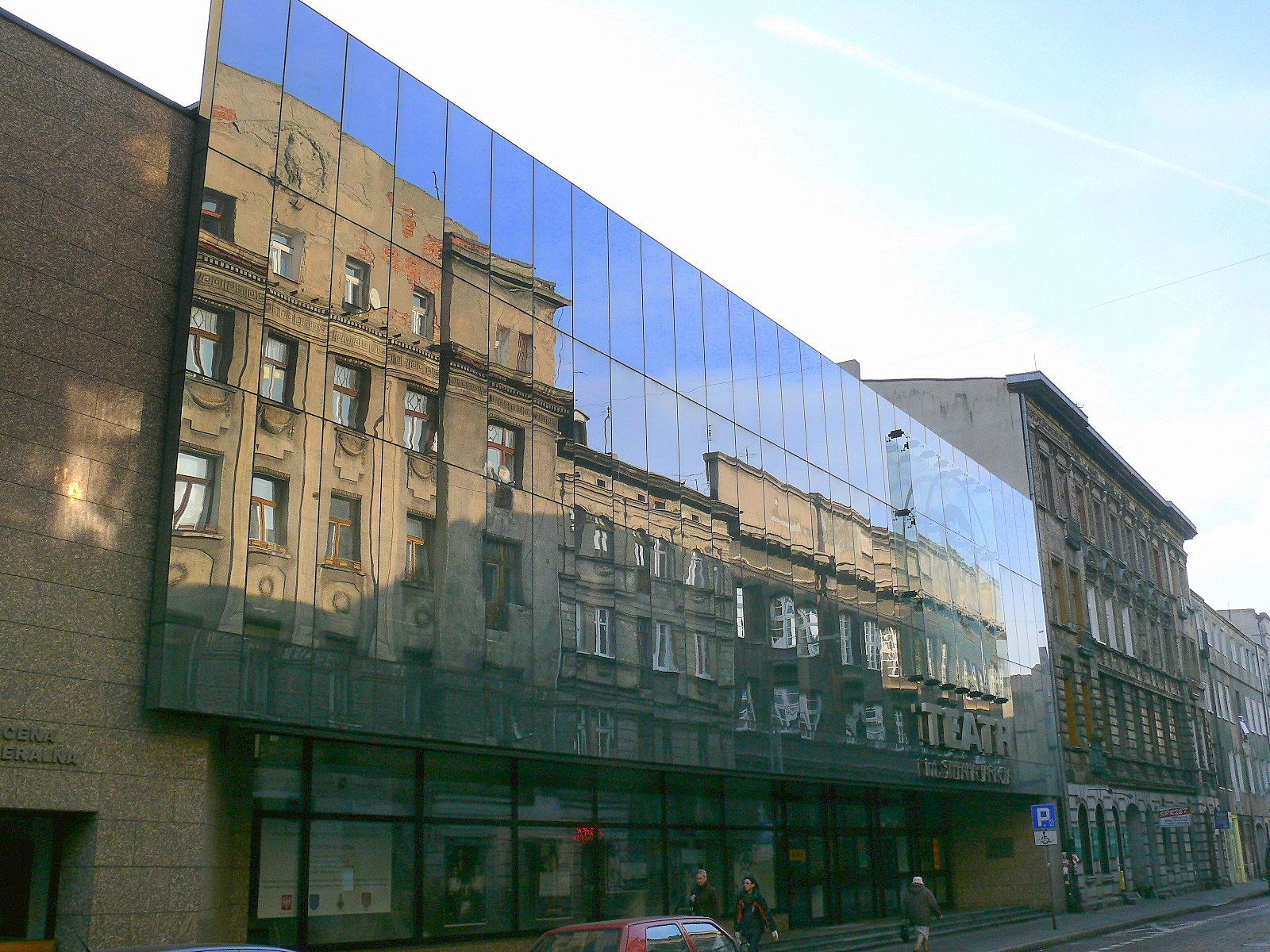
An image of Stefan Jaracz Theatre

The Stefan Jaracz Theatre in Łódź, Poland is the oldest theatre in the region. It is a repertory theatre subordinate to the Marshall Office of the Łódź Voivodeship. During the years 1888-1949 (when the theatre chose Stefan Jaracz as its patron) it was known as the Polish Theatre and the City Theatre.

== Beginnings (1888–1918) ==
The theatre opened on November 6, 1888 in the "Victoria" Building (currently a cinema). One Lucjan Kościelecki made notable efforts to bring the theatre to life. The first premiere was a staging of Kazimierz Zalewski's Apfels' Matrimony. The building situated at Piotrkowska Street served as the theatre's base till May 5, 1909 - when it completely burned down in a fire. The theatre's director - Aleksander Zelwerowicz (who ran the theatre between 1909 and 1911) - moved the company and crew to a structure at Jaracza Street (then named Cegielniana Street) where it resides to this day.

During Zelwerowicz's directorship Łódź as the first city of Congress Poland watched the now classic works of Stanisław Wyspiański - The Curse and The Wedding. The theatre continued to perform national drama, including Adam Mickiewicz's The Forefather's Eve, Juliusz Słowacki's Fantazy, The Silver Dream of Salome and Samuel Zborowski and Zygmunt Krasiński's Irydion.

== The interwar period (1918–1939) ==
Amongst the directors who managed the theatre in the interwar period were Bolesław Gorczyński, Karol Adwentowicz, Karol Borowski, Stanisława Wysocka and Kazimierz Wroczyński. But it was thanks to the works of Leon Schiller, who was persistent in forming his political theatre manifestos, that Łódź continued to be noticed on Poland's theatrical map. His most prominent performances of the period were Jaroslav Hašekś The Good Soldier Švejk, Friedrich Wolf's Cyankali, Sergei Tretyakov's Roar China!, Zygmunt Krasiński The Un-Divine Comedy and Juliusz Słowacki's Kordian.

== The war period (1939–1945) ==
During the Nazi occupation the theatre (then by the name of City Theatre) was converted into the German Theater zum Litzmannstadt. It was closed down in 1944 when the German army began their retreat from Poland.

== The post-war years (1945–1949) ==
In January 1945 the company of the Polish People's Army Theatre under the command of Władysław Krasnowiecki arrived to Łódź. They chose the building at Cegielniana Street as their seat. The theatre opened on March 22 with a staging of Stanisław Wyspiański's The Wedding. It assembled acclaimed actors, directors and stage designers, to name Aleksander Zelwerowicz, Jan Kreczmar, Juliusz Osterwa, Henryk Szletyński, Edmund Wierciński, Józef Węgrzyn, Jacek Woszczerowicz, Jadwiga Chojnacka, Jan Świderski and Czesław Wołłejko.

In the years 1946-1949 the stage was managed by Leon Schiller, whose output was of great significance. He personally prepared ten performances during three theatrical seasons. The most distinguished ones were Wojciech Bogusławski's Krakovians and Highlanders, Fernando de Rojas' La Celestina, William Shakespeare's The Tempest, Jan Drda's Playing with the Devil and the Song Stall. These works continued Schiller's line of political theatre while allowing the director to experiment with the form of folklore theatre at the same time. They merged local tradition with contemporary themes.

In 1949 the company of the Polish Army Theatre together with Schiller moved to Warsaw and Iwo Gall became the stage's new leading director. The theatre took the name of Stefan Jaracz as its patron.

== From Gall to Zukowski (1950–1971) ==
Iwo Gall successor, Feliks Żukowski followed in Schiller's steps and was greatly influenced by his predecessors understanding of theatre. The most memorable performance made in the early 1950s was Friedrich Schiller's The Robbers directed by Czesław Staszewski.

Żukowski left the office in 1956 and he was followed by Emil Chaberski (1956–57), Aleksander Bardini and Konrad Laszewski (1957–58), then Karol Borowski (1958–60). In 1961 returned to his former position and remained the theatre's director till 1971, favoring political plays in his repertoire: Nikolai Pogodin's The third: Pathetic, Bertolt Brecht's Fear and Misery of the Third Reich, Albert Camus' Caligula. Alongside this line Żukowski commenced a cycle entitled Contemporary Classics inaugurated with Jean Giraudoux's Ondine and Luigi Pirandello's Six Characters in Search of an Author. In November 1965 the theatre opened a second stage - the 7.15 Theatre. The stage was used to present comedies, farce, music-based entertainment and crime fiction.

== Maciejowski and Hussakowski (1971–1992) ==
In 1971 Żukowski was succeeded by Jan Maciejowski (1971–78), whose main interest was in reflecting upon contemporary reality as well as understanding the classics in terms of existentialism. The most interesting performances of his period included William Shakespeare's Hamlet and Henry IV, Part 1 and Part 2, Fritz Hochwälder's The Public Prosecutor, Zygmunt Krasiński's The Un-Divine Comedy, Stanisław Wyspiański's Varsovian Anthem, Mikhail Schatrov's The Bolsheviks, Mikhail Bulgakov's The Days of the Turbins, Jerzy Andrzejewski's Ashes and Diamonds. In the midst of the 1960s Jerzy Grzegorzewski began cooperating with the theatre and directed Bertolt Brecht's The Caucasian Chalk Circle, Stanisław Wyspiański The Wedding, Sophocles' Antigone, Jean Genet's The Balcony and Witkacy's The Shoemakers.

1971 is also the time when the theatre opened its Small Stage. More intimate, chamber performances were held there in order to create a new quality of reaching the audience. The first performances included Eric Westphal's Those Clouds of Yours, Ted Whitehead's Alpha Beta, Tom Stoppard's Rosencrantz and Guildenstern are Dead and David Storey's Home. In 1988 however the theatre lost the 7.15 Stage to the Philharmonic Orchestra of Łódź.

Between 1979 and 1992 the Stefan Jaracz Theatre was governed by Bogdan Hussakowski, who favoured a repertoire that would mix the aesthetics of high and low drama. Amongst the notable premieres of his directorship are to be named Witold Gombrowicz's Trans-Atlantic, Henryk Rzewuski's The Memoirs of Soplica, Tadeusz Słobodzianek's Citizen Pekosiewicz (all directed by Mikolaj Grabowski), Aleksander Fredro's Mr. Jovial (dir. by Tadeusz Bradecki), Adam Mickiewicz's The Forefather's Eve (dir. by Maciej Prus) alongside of Hussakowski's own works - Bolesław Leśmian's Savagery of Posthumous Habits, August Strindberg's Easter and Eugène Scribe's and Ernest Legouvé's Adrienne Lecouvreur.

== Recent history (1992–present) ==
In 1992 Waldemar Zawodziński, both a director and a stage designer, became the theatre's artistic director and is handling its stages to this day. His works include Fernando de Rojas' La Celestina, Georg Büchner's, Woyzeck, William Shakespeare's A Midsummer Night's Dream, Christopher Marlowe's The Tragical History of Doctor Faustus, Friedrich Schiller's Intrigue and Love, Nijinsky (a solo play based on the life of danseur and choreographer Vaslav Nijinsky) and Witold Gombrowicz The Marriage.

In 1995 a third stage was added to the theatre, the Chamber Stage. Sabina Nowacka, who had been a general director of the theatre for quite a number of years, was the initiator of the project. The stage was dedicated to the memory of Leon Schiller and it opened with a staging of Stanisław Wyspiański's The Curse to commemorate the title Aleksander Zelwerowicz chose when commencing his directorship of the theatre.

The theatre's current aim is to discuss topics that concern the modern world. It is doing so through stagings of both Polish and international classics, but the theatre is also eager to explore contemporary drama.

In the year 2008 the theatre added four more stages. Through an EU-funded project infrastructures were restored in Sieradz, Skierniewice, Piotrków Trybunalski and Radomsko. The project, meant to make theatre more accessible to milieus that are located away from major cultural and entertainment centers, thus allows the theatre to operate not only within city limits, but also on its four regional stages.
