= Małgorzata Rejmer =

Polish novelist and short story writer (born 1985)

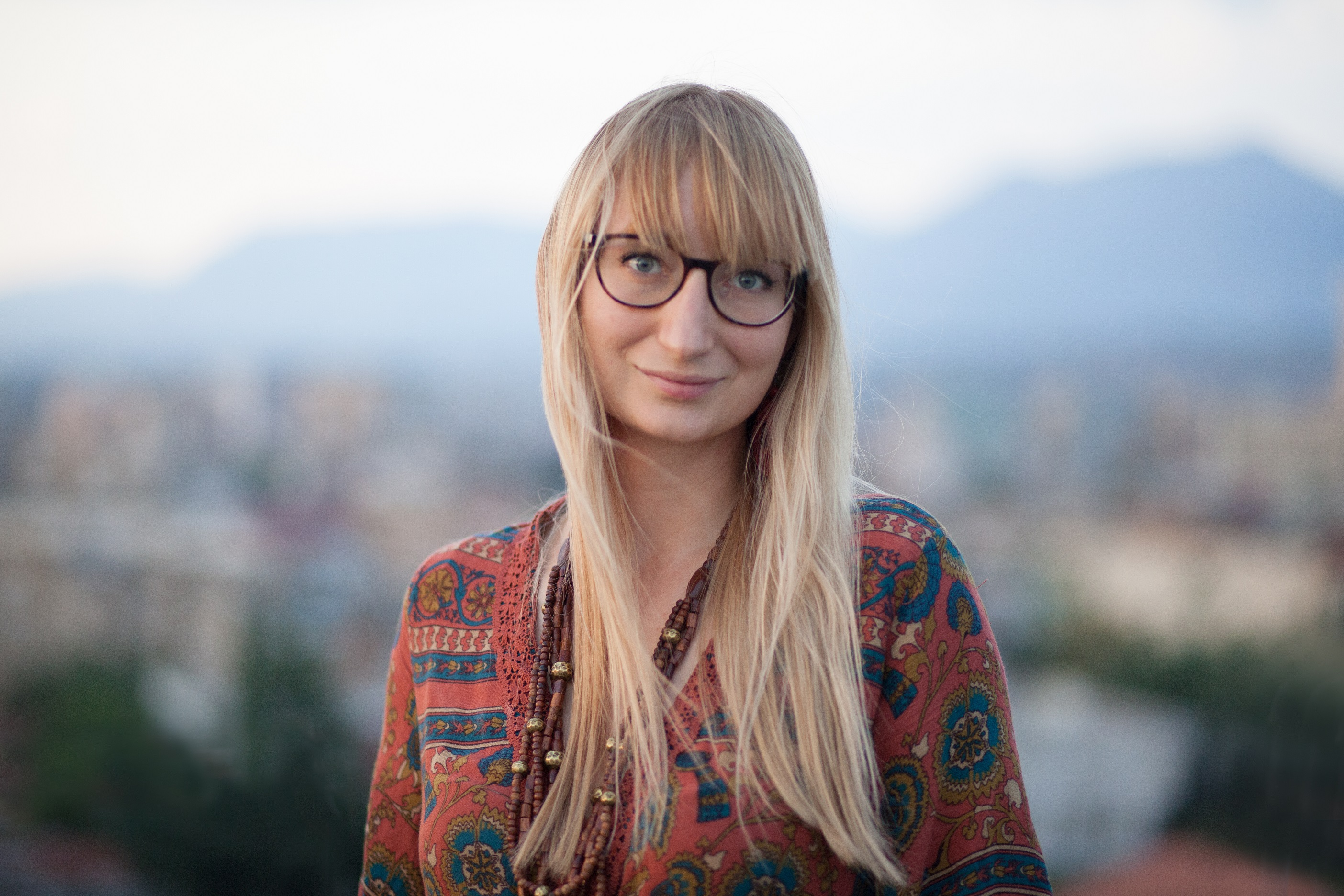
- Born: 6 September 1985 (age 40); Warsaw, Poland
- Occupations: writer, journalist
- Awards: Paszport Polityki; Nike Award, nomination

Małgorzata Zofia (Margo) Rejmer, born in 1985 in Warsaw, is a Polish novelist, reporter, and writer of short stories.

Her books, which have been translated into eight languages, include the novel Toximia (2009) and two works of nonfiction: Bucharest: Dust and Blood, which won the Newsweek Award for best book of 2014, the Gryfia Literary Award (2014), and the TVP Kultura Award (2014); and Mud Sweeter than Honey, for which she was awarded the Polityka Passport, the most prestigious prize in Poland for emerging artists, as well as the Arkady Fiedler Award. She holds the title of the Young Ambassador of the Polish Language.

== Works ==
- 2009: Toksymia. Warsaw, Lampa i Iskra Boża
- 2013: Bukareszt. Kurz i krew, Warsaw, Wydawnictwo Czarne
- 2018: Błoto słodsze niż miód, Głosy komunistycznej Albanii, Warsaw, Wydawnictwo Czarne
