= Paszport Polityki =

Polish cultural award

- Awarded for: Achievements in various fields of culture
- Location: Warsaw
- Country: Poland
- Presented by: Polityka magazine
- First award: 1993
- Website: polityka.pl/tygodnikpolityka/kultura/paszporty

Paszport Polityki (Polityka's Passport) is an annual Polish cultural award presented by the weekly magazine Polityka since 1993.

It is presented in six major categories: literature, film, theatre, classical music, popular music, visual arts (and entertainment up until 2005). In 2002 a new, seventh category was added: creator of culture while in 2016 the eighth category added was digital culture.

According to the editorial declaration, the award is a distinction for creators who make the fastest progress, surprise with new achievements, their activities bode well in the future and thus deserve care, support and promotion in the world. The award's name was conceived as a symbolic passport to the world's art. It is usually given to relatively young creators, often for outstanding debuts.

== List of laureates ==
2025

- Film: Emi Buchwald
- Stage: Katarzyna Minkowska
- Book: Stanisław Łubieński
- Classical music: Aleksandra Słyż
- Popular music: Sw@da x Niczos
- Visual arts: Ant Łakomsk
- Digital culture: Tomasz Kisilewicz (11 Bit Studios)
- Creator of culture: Tomasz Lipiński
- Readers' Passport: Yehuda Prokopowicz

2024

- Film: Kamila Tarabura
- Stage: Wojciech Grudziński
- Book: Jul Łyskawa
- Classical music: Gabriela Legun
- Popular music: Kuba Więcek
- Visual arts: Monika Drożyńska
- Digital culture: Kamil Dyszewski (NAFO)
- Creator of culture: Marek Koterski
- Readers' Passport: Sandra Drzymalska

2023

- Film: Paweł Maślona
- Theatre: Katarzyna Szyngiera
- Book: Jacek Świdziński
- Classical music: Karolina Mikołajczyk and Iwo Jedencki
- Popular music: Hania Rani
- Visual arts: Marta Nadolle
- Digital culture: Starward Industries
- Creator of culture: Józef Hen
- Readers' Passport: Łona

2022

- Literature: Grzegorz Piątek
- Film: Jan Holoubek
- Theatre: Jakub Skrzywanek
- Classical music: Anna Sułkowska–Migoń
- Popular music: 1988, or Przemysław Jankowiak
- Visual arts: Agata Słowak
- Digital culture: Anna and Jakub Górniccy (Outriders)
- Creator of culture: Dorota Masłowska, Ryszard Poznakowski, Wilhelm Sasnal

2021

- Literature: Łukasz Barys
- Film: Aleksandra Terpińska
- Theatre: Dominik Strycharski
- Classical music: Teoniki Rożynek
- Popular music: Ralph Kaminski
- Visual arts: Jana Shostak
- Digital culture: Tomasz Konrad Ostafin
- Creator of culture: Kasia Nosowska

2020

- Literature: Mira Marcinów
- Film: Piotr Domalewski
- Theatre: Teatr 21
- Classical music: Ania Karpowicz
- Popular music: Siksa
- Visual arts: Małgorzata Mirga-Tas
- Digital culture: Marta Malinowska
- Creator of culture: Lech Janerka and Bożena Janerka

2019

- Literature: Dominika Słowik
- Film: Bartosz Bielenia
- Theatre: Weronika Szczawińska
- Classical music: Jakub Józef Orliński
- Popular music: Błażej Król
- Visual arts: Weronika Gęsicka
- Digital culture: Dawid Ciślak
- Creator of culture: Olga Tokarczuk

2018

- Literature: Małgorzata Rejmer
- Film: Joanna Kulig
- Theatre: Marta Górnicka
- Classical music: Aleksander Nowak
- Popular music: Dawid Podsiadło
- Visual arts: Diana Leonek
- Digital culture: Piotr Barszczewski, Krzysztof Cybulski, Krzysztof Goliński, Jakub Koźniewski
- Creator of culture: Krystyna Janda

2017

- Literature: Marcin Wicha
- Film: Jagoda Szelc
- Theatre: Michał Borczuch
- Classical music: Joanna Freszel
- Popular music: Hańba!
- Visual arts: Norman Leto
- Digital culture: Studio Bloober Team

2016

- Literature: Natalia Fiedorczuk-Cieślak
- Film: Jan P. Matuszyński
- Theatre: Anna Smolar
- Classical music: Marzena Diakun
- Popular music: Wacław Zimpel
- Visual arts: Daniel Rycharski
- Digital culture: Michał Staniszewski (Studio Plastic)
- Creator of culture: Jan Ptaszyn Wróblewski

2015

- Literature: Łukasz Orbitowski
- Film: Magnus von Horn
- Theatre: Ewelina Marciniak
- Classical music: Marcin Świątkiewicz
- Popular music: Kuba Ziołek
- Visual arts: Tymek Borowski
- Creator of culture: CD Projekt

2014

- Literature: Zygmunt Miłoszewski
- Film: Jan Komasa
- Theatre: Radosław Rychcik
- Classical music: Kwadrofonik
- Popular music: Pablopavo
- Visual arts: Jakub Woynarowski
- Creator of culture: Agnieszka Holland

2013

- Literature: Ziemowit Szczerek
- Film: Dawid Ogrodnik
- Theatre: Jolanta Janiczak and Wiktor Rubin
- Popular music: Marcin Masecki
- Visual arts: Aneta Grzeszykowska
- Creator of culture: Tomasz Stańko

2012

- Literature: Szczepan Twardoch
- Film: Marcin Dorociński
- Theatre: Iwan Wyrypajew
- Classical music: Magdalena Bojanowicz and Maciej Frąckiewicz
- Popular music: Très.b
- Visual arts: Julita Wójcik
- Creator of culture: Krzysztof Penderecki and Elżbieta Penderecka

2011

- Literature: Mikołaj Łoziński
- Film: Rafael Lewandowski
- Theatre: Krzysztof Garbaczewski
- Classical music: Aleksandra Kuls
- Popular music: Julia Marcell and Maciej Szajkowski
- Visual arts: Nicolas Grospierre
- Creator of culture: Jerzy Jarocki

2010

- Literature: Ignacy Karpowicz
- Film: Paweł Sala
- Theatre: Paweł Demirski and Monika Strzępka
- Classical music: Wioletta Chodowicz
- Popular music: Macio Moretti
- Visual arts: Wojciech Bąkowski

2009

- Literature: Piotr Paziński
- Film: Borys Lankosz and Xawery Żuławski
- Theatre: Sandra Korzeniak
- Classical music: Barbara Wysocka
- Popular music: L.U.C.
- Visual arts: Karol Radziszewski
- Creator of culture: Paweł Althamer

2008

- Literature: Sylwia Chutnik
- Film: Małgorzata Szumowska
- Theatre: Paweł Łysak
- Classical music: Artur Ruciński
- Popular music: Maria Peszek
- Visual arts: Maciej Kurak
- Creator of culture: Krystian Lupa

2007

- Literature: Michał Witkowski
- Film: Łukasz Palkowski
- Theatre: Michał Zadara
- Classical music: Łukasz Bobrowicz
- Popular music: Krzysztof Grabowski
- Visual arts: Joanna Rajkowska
- Creator of culture: Andrzej Wajda

2006

- Literature: Jacek Dehnel
- Film: Sławomir Fabicki
- Theatre: Maja Kleczewska
- Music: Agata Szymczewska
- Popular music: Fisz and Emade
- Visual arts: Grupa Twożywo
- Creator of culture: Maria Janion

2005

- Literature: Marek Krajewski
- Film: Przemysław Wojcieszek
- Theatre: Jan Klata
- Classical music: Rafał Blechacz
- Visual arts: Robert Kuśmirowski
- Entertainment: Skalpel
- Creator of culture: Paweł Dunin-Wąsowicz

2004

- Literature: Sławomir Shuty
- Film: Wojtek Smarzowski
- Theatre: Paweł Szkotak
- Classical music: Agata Zubel
- Visual arts: Cezary Bodzianowski
- Entertainment: Leszek Możdżer
- Creator of culture: Wojciech Trzciński

2003

- Literature – Wojciech Kuczok
- Film – Andrzej Jakimowski
- Theatre – Danuta Stenka
- Music – Kuba Jakowicz
- Visual arts – Monika Sosnowska
- Entertainment – Andrzej Smolik
- Creator of culture – Marek Żydowicz

2002

- Literature – Dorota Masłowska
- Film – Piotr Trzaskalski
- Theatre – Krzysztof Warlikowski
- Music – Dominik Połoński
- Visual arts – Marcin Maciejowski
- Entertainment – Anna Maria Jopek
- Creator of culture – Roman Gutek

2001

- Literature – Paweł Huelle
- Film – Robert Gliński
- Music – Mariusz Treliński
- Theatre – Piotr Cieplak
- Visual arts – Katarzyna Józefowicz
- Entertainment – Agnieszka Chylińska

2000

- Literature – Marzanna Bogumiła Kielar
- Film – Maja Ostaszewska
- Theatre – Paweł Miśkiewicz
- Music – Stanisław Drzewiecki
- Visual arts – Dominik Lejman
- Entertainment – Ryszard Tymon Tymański

1999

- Literature – Marek Bieńczyk
- Film – Krzysztof Krauze
- Theatre – Agnieszka Glińska
- Music – Paweł Mykietyn
- Visual arts – Leon Tarasewicz
- Entertainment – Myslovitz

1998

- Literature – Jerzy Pilch
- Film – Dorota Kędzierzawska
- Theatre – Grzegorz Jarzyna
- Music – Rafał Kwiatkowski
- Visual arts – Jarosław Modzelewski
- Entertainment – Kazik Staszewski

1997

- Literature – Andrzej Sapkowski
- Film – Jerzy Stuhr
- Theatre – Anna Augustynowicz
- Music – Dariusz Paradowski
- Visual arts – Katarzyna Kozyra
- Entertainment – Kayah

1996

- Literature – Olga Tokarczuk
- Film – Łukasz Kośmicki
- Theatre – Krzysztof Rau
- Music – Olga Pasiecznik
- Visual arts – Zofia Kulik
- Entertainment – Grzegorz Ciechowski

1995

- Literature – Stefan Chwin
- Film – Marcel Łoziński
- Theatre – Jolanta Ptaszyńska
- Music – Stefan Sutkowski
- Visual arts – Mirosław Bałka
- Entertainment – Wojciech Waglewski

1994

- Literature – Marcin Świetlicki (declined the award)
- Film – Jan Jakub Kolski
- Theatre – Krystyna Meissner
- Music – Piotr Anderszewski
- Visual arts – Ryszard Górecki
- Entertainment – Edyta Bartosiewicz

1993

- Literature – Teodor Parnicki
- Film – Jacek Bławut
- Theatre – Tadeusz Słobodzianek
- Music – Stanisław Leszczyński
- Visual arts – Stasys Eidrigevičius
- Entertainment – Kasia Nosowska

== See also ==
- List of European art awards
- Nike Award
- Silesius Poetry Award
- Angelus Award
- Wisława Szymborska Award
- Polish literature
