= Zbigniew Raszewski Theatre Institute =

Cultural institution in Warsaw, Poland

Coordinates: 52.218848°N 21.028254°E

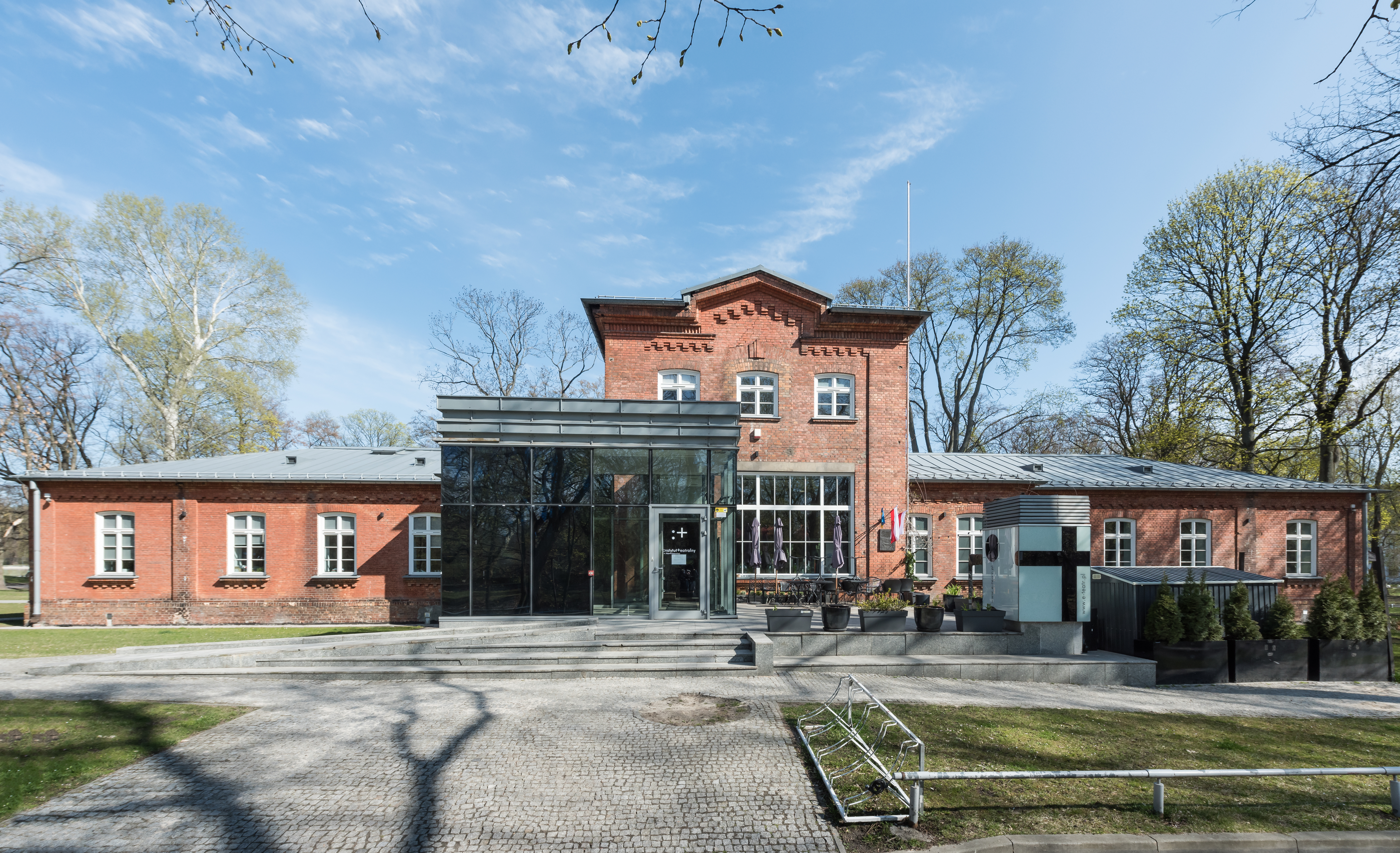
Zbigniew Raszewski Theatre Institute

The Zbigniew Raszewski Theatre Institute is a state cultural institution in Warsaw, Poland, dedicated to documenting, organizing, and promoting Polish theatre life.

In was established on July 1, 2003 and named after Zbigniew Raszewski, Polish writer and theatre historian. Its first director was Maciej Nowak (2014–2018).

The institute maintains an online Encyclopedia of Polish Theatre, Poland's only online theatre television www.e-teatr.tv and the theatre portal e-teatr.pl.

In 2024, Justyna Czarnota-Misztal was appointed director.
