= Tadeusz Słobodzianek =

Polish playwright

Tadeusz Słobodzianek (born 26 April 1955) is a Polish playwright, theatre director and critic.

== Life ==
Słobodzianek was born on 26 April 1955 in Yeniseysk, Soviet Union. He graduated from the Jagiellonian University in Kraków with a degree in theatre studies. Between 1978 and 1981, he wrote theatre reviews under the alias Jan Koniecpolski. First in student journals, and later in a popular weekly journal “Polityka.” He has worked as a literary manager, director, and dramaturge with various theatres in Warsaw, Kraków, Łódź, Poznań, Gdańsk, Kalisz and Białystok. In 1991, he co-founded Teatr Wierszalin. In 2003, he founded Laboratorium Dramatu (Drama Laboratory) in Warsaw, Drama School as well as The Art of Dialogue Foundation, which mentored and supported many emerging playwrights, directors, and actors.

Between 2010 and 2012, he served as the executive and artistic director in Teatr na Woli im. Tadeusza Łomnickiego, and from 2012 till 2022, he was the executive and artistic director of the Dramatyczny Theatre in Warsaw (Teatr Dramatyczny m. st. Warszawy).

== Playwrighting ==
His playwrighting draws upon Baroque theatre, Polish Romanticism, and the history of 20th century. He is also often inspired by myths and folk tales, specifically pertaining to the eastern Polish border region.

He made his debut in 1980 with Historia o żebraku i osiołku (The Story of the Beggar and the Donkey, written in 1977). His most notable plays include Car Mikołaj (Tsar Nikolai, premiered in 1987), Obywatel Pekosiewicz (Citizen Pekosiewicz, premiered in 1989), Prorok Ilja (Prophet Ilya, premiered in 1994), and his best known play: Nasza klasa (Our Class, premiered in 2008).

Our Class has been awarded the prestigious Nike Award in 2010, being the only play in the history of the award to be selected. Also in 2010 it was selected as one of the best plays of the season by the European Theatre Convention. The play depicts the story of 10 students of the same class in a small Polish village. It begins in 1925 and ends at the end of the 20th century. Our class is an attempt to understand how violence comes to be, and the play does this by depicting the lives of the victims and oppressors of the Jedwabne Pogrom in 1941. The play had its premiere in 2009 at the National Theatre in London. Since then it has been staged multiple times all over the world, being one of the most often staged abroad Polish play. In January 2024 it had its Off-Broadway premiere by Arlekin Players Theatre at Brooklyn Academy of Music.

Most recently he has written and published a collection of plays for four actors, called Kwartety Otwockie (Otwock Quartets) in which he portrays and distorts the history of the 20th century theatre.

His plays have been translated and staged in many languages, including English, German, Hebrew, French, Italian, Spanish, Portuguese, Swedish, Norwegian, Danish, Czech, Slovak, Slovenian, Serbian, Macedonian, Romanian, Hungarian, Russian, Ukrainian, Belarusian, Lithuanian, Latvian, Estonian, Persian, Kazakh, Mongolian, Korean, Japanese, and Chinese.

== List of plays ==
- Historia o żebraku i osiołku, 1980
- Baśń jesienna, 1981
- Pułapka, 1982
- Car Mikołaj, 1985
- Obywatel Pekosiewicz, 1986
- Turlajgroszek, co-authored with Piotr Tomaszuk, 1990
- Prorok Ilja, 1991
- Jaskółeczka, 1992
- Merlin – inna historia, 1993
- Kowal Malambo, 1993
- Obywatel Pekoś, 1997
- Sen pluskwy, czyli towarzysz Chrystus, 2000
- Nasza klasa. Historia w XIV lekcjach, 2008
- Śmierć proroka i inne historie o końcu świata, 2012
- Młody Stalin, 2013
- Historia Jakuba, 2015
- Niedźwiedź Wojtek, 2016
- Fatalista, 2019
- Cerber z Beaubourg, 2020
- Geniusz, 2020
- Helsinki, 2020
- Krzew gorejący, 2020
- Powrót Orfeusza, 2020
- Sztuka intonacji, 2020

== Awards ==
- 1983 – Award from the Minister of Culture and Art for Best Staging of Polish Play – for directing Osmędeusze and Kabaret Kici-Koci written by Miron Białoszewski and Ludwik Hering from the Stefan Jaracz Theatre in Łódź, granted at the 18th Small Theatre Forms Festival in Szczecin;
- 1985 – 3rd place at the Modern Drama Competition in Wrocław for Car Mikołaj / Tsar Nikolai;
- 1986 – 2nd place for the drama Obywatel Pekosiewicz / Citizen Pekosiewiczat the Modern Drama Competition in Warsaw; a special distinction for the drama Car Mikołaj / Tsar Nikolai in the drama text competition;
- 1988 – Literary Fund Award in the Drama Category for best play for Car Mikołaj / Tsar Nikolai; the Award of the Białystok Voivodship Marshall for playwright achievements, especially for Car Mikołaj / Tsar Nikolai and Obywatel Pekosiewicz / Citizen Pekosiewicz;
- 1989 – award for the best drama at the 27th Modern Dramas Festival in Wrocław for Obywatel Pekosiewicz / Citizen Pekosiewicz from the Stefan Jaracz Theatre in Łódź;
- 1991 – 1st place for the best drama for Turlajgroszek / Rolling Peas(together with Piotr Tomaszuk) at the 29th Polish Contemporary Plays Festival; the award of the Gdańsk Voivodship Marshal for Turlajgroszek / Rolling Peas from Miniatura Theatre in Gdańsk; Main Award for Turlajgroszek / Rolling Peas from the Wierszalin Theatre at the 15th Puppet Theatre Festival in Opole;
- 1992 – Grand Prix for Prorok Ilja / Prophet Ilya at the Contemporary Plays Competition in Wrocław; the Jan Dorman ASITEJ Asocciation Award for Turlajgroszek / Rolling Peas from the Wierszalin Theatre;
- 1994 – Paszport Polityki in category of theatre in 1993 for his playwrighting and for the achievements of Towarzystwo Wierszalin; Literary Award of the Kościelski Foundation for lifetime achievements; Special Award of the Television Playhouse director for directing Prorok Ilja / Prophet Ilya;
- 1995 – Fringe Firste for Merlin - inna historia/ Merlin, The Secret Historyfrom the Wierszalin Theatre at the International Theatre Festival in Edinburgh; the Friedrich Luft German Critics' Award for Prorok Ilja / Prophet Ilya from the Teatr Kreatur in Berlin;
- 1997 – Special Distinction for Sen pluskwy / Bedbug's Dream of the Minister of Culture and National Heritage Competition for a play for an adult audience;
- 1998 – an award for the best drama for Obywatel Pekoś / Citizen Pekoś of the Polish Contemporary Play Staging Competition;
- 2000 – Audience Award and Journalists Award of the 18th Gorzów Theatre Meetings; Main Award of the 6th Competition of the Ministry of Culture and National Heritage for the Best Staging of Polish Contemporary Drama for Prorok Ilja / Prophet Ilya from the Nowy Theatre in Łódź;
- 2002 – Srebrna Łódka / Silver Boat Award for Sen pluskwy / Bedbug's Dream from the Nowy Theatre in Łódź for the best play of the season 2001/2002; the Golden Mask Award for Sen pluskwy / Bedbug's Dream from the Nowy Theatre in Łódź for the best play of the season 2001/2002; Main Award of the 8th Competition of the Ministry of Culture and National Heritage for the Best Staging of Polish Contemporary Drama for the play Sen pluskwy / Bedbug's Dream from the Nowy Theatre in Łódź; the Stanisław Bieniasz Medal for Sen pluskwy / Bedbug's Dream from the Nowy Theatre in Łódź at the 2. Contemporary Drama Festival "Rzeczywistość przedstawiona" in Zabrze;
- 2007 – Special distinction of the 9th PRO PUBLICO BONO Competition for the best activity among citizens in the education category for creating and managing the Laboratorium Dramatu / Drama Laboratory;
- 2010 – Nike Literary Award for a drama Nasza klasa / Our Class;
- 2011 – Medal of the Warsaw Ghetto Uprising granted by the Association of Jewish War Veterans and Wronged During World War II.
