= Farewell to Autumn =

1990 Polish film

- Directed by: Mariusz Trelinski
- Written by: Wojciech Nowak; Mariusz Trelinski; Janusz Wróblewski
- Starring: Jan Frycz
- Cinematography: Jaroslaw Zamojda
- Edited by: Teresa Miziolek
- Music by: Michał Urbaniak
- Release date: 1990
- Language: Polish

Farewell to Autumn (Polish: Pożegnanie jesieni) is a 1990 Polish drama film co-written and directed by Mariusz Trelinski. It was entered into the main competition at the 47th edition of the Venice Film Festival.

== Plot ==
Atanazy Bazakbal, a disillusioned young writer, is obsessed with Hela Bertz, the daughter of a wealthy industrialist. Hela marries Prince Prepudrech while Atanazy weds Zofia Osłabędzka, but their double wedding is shattered by a violent communist uprising. Hela flees to Switzerland and takes Atanazy with her, but jealousy and betrayal follow: Atanazy kills Hela’s lover in a duel, and Zofia, neglected and pregnant, takes her own life.

== Cast ==
- Jan Frycz as Atanazy Bazakbal
- Maria Pakulnis as Hela Bertz
- Grazyna Trela as Zofia Oslabedzka
- Henryk Bista as Belzebub Bertz
- Jan Peszek as Conte Lohoyski
- Leszek Abrahamowicz as Principer Prepudrech
- Maciej Prus as Don Wyprztyk
- Piotr Skiba as Zelislaw Smorski
- Wojcie as Baron Chwazdrygiel

== Reception ==
The film received numerous awards, including the Award of the Minister of Culture and Art and the awards for Best Production Design and Best Costume Design at the 1990 Polish Film Festival. It has been described as "the first postmodern Polish film that captivates with its visual opulence and profound interpretation of literary material and its use of the grotesque".
