= Marcin Wicha =

Polish artist and writer (1972–2025)

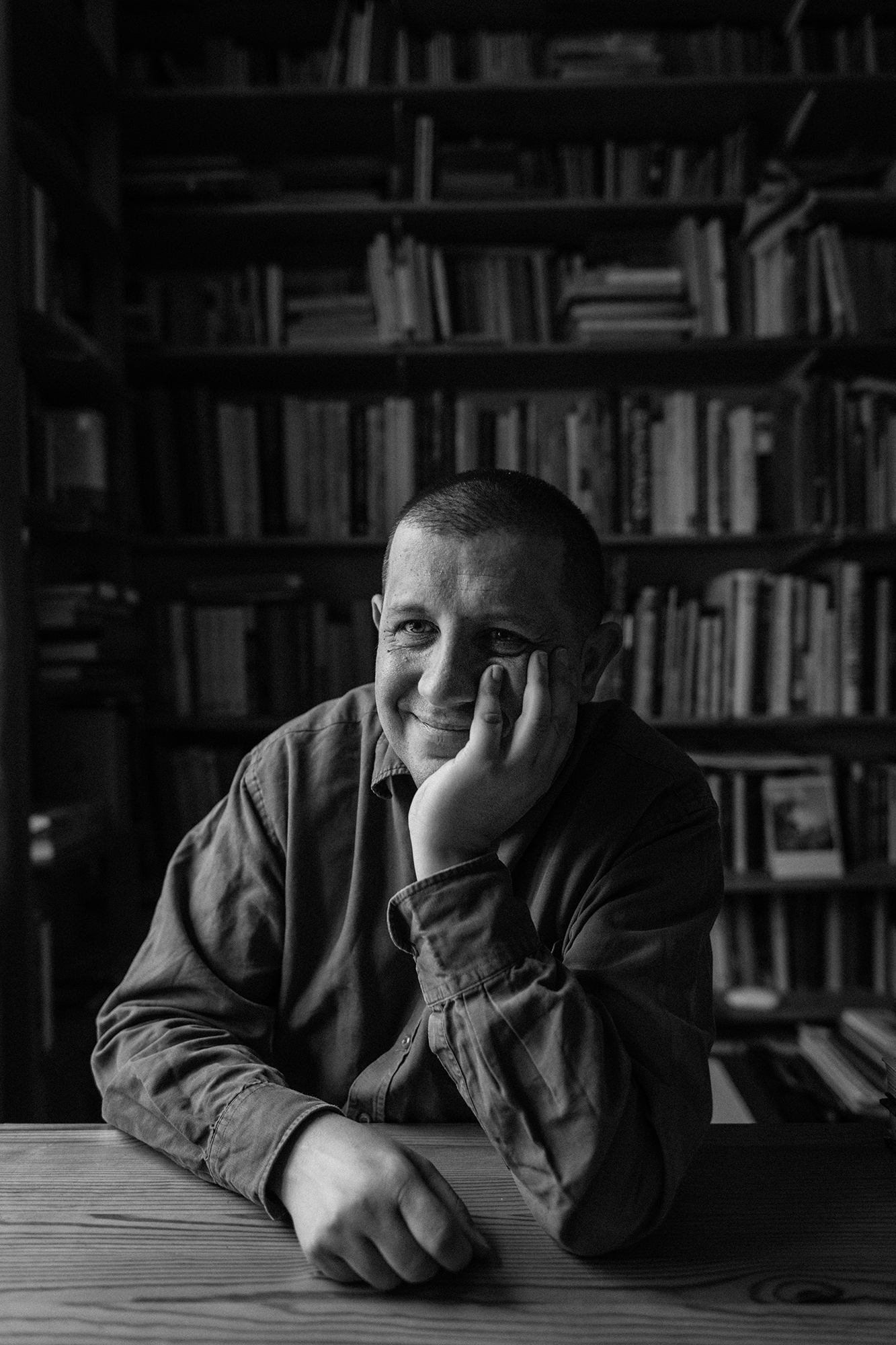
- Born: 1972; Warsaw, Poland
- Died: 24 January 2025 (aged 52)
- Occupations: Writer, essayist, graphic designer

Marcin Wicha (1972 – 24 January 2025) was a Polish graphic designer, children's author, and essayist.

== Background ==
Wicha was born in Warsaw, Poland in 1972, to a family of Jewish origin. He was the son of Piotr Wicha (1946–2006), an architect, and his wife, Joanna Rabanowska-Wicha (1946–2015); the grandson of Jan Rabanowski from his mother's side, a politician and minister of communications of Poland during the Communist period, and of Władysław Wicha from his father's side, who served as Minister of Interior. Wicha died on 24 January 2025, at the age of 52.

== Career ==
Wicha was a cartoonist for the Catholic weekly magazine Tygodnik Powszechny, and contributed cartoons to the monthly magazine Charaktery and the daily newspaper Gazeta Wyborcza. He wrote a number of children's books.

His 2017 book Rzeczy, których nie wyrzuciłem received the 2017 Polityka Passport for literature, the 2018 Nike Literary Award, and the Witold Gombrowicz Literary Award, and was shortlisted for the Gdynia Literary Prize. It was translated into English and published in 2021 under the title Things I Didn't Throw Out. It is partly an autobiographical novel and partly a meditation on the loss of loved ones. In translation it was awarded a PEN Translates Award by English PEN in 2021.

== Works (in English translation) ==
- Things I Didn't Throw Out (2021: Daunt Books, translated by Marta Dziurosz), ISBN 978-1-914198-02-1
- How I Stopped Loving Design (online excerpt, Public Seminar, translated by Marta Dziurosz)
