= Iwo Gall =

Polish theater director (1890–1959)

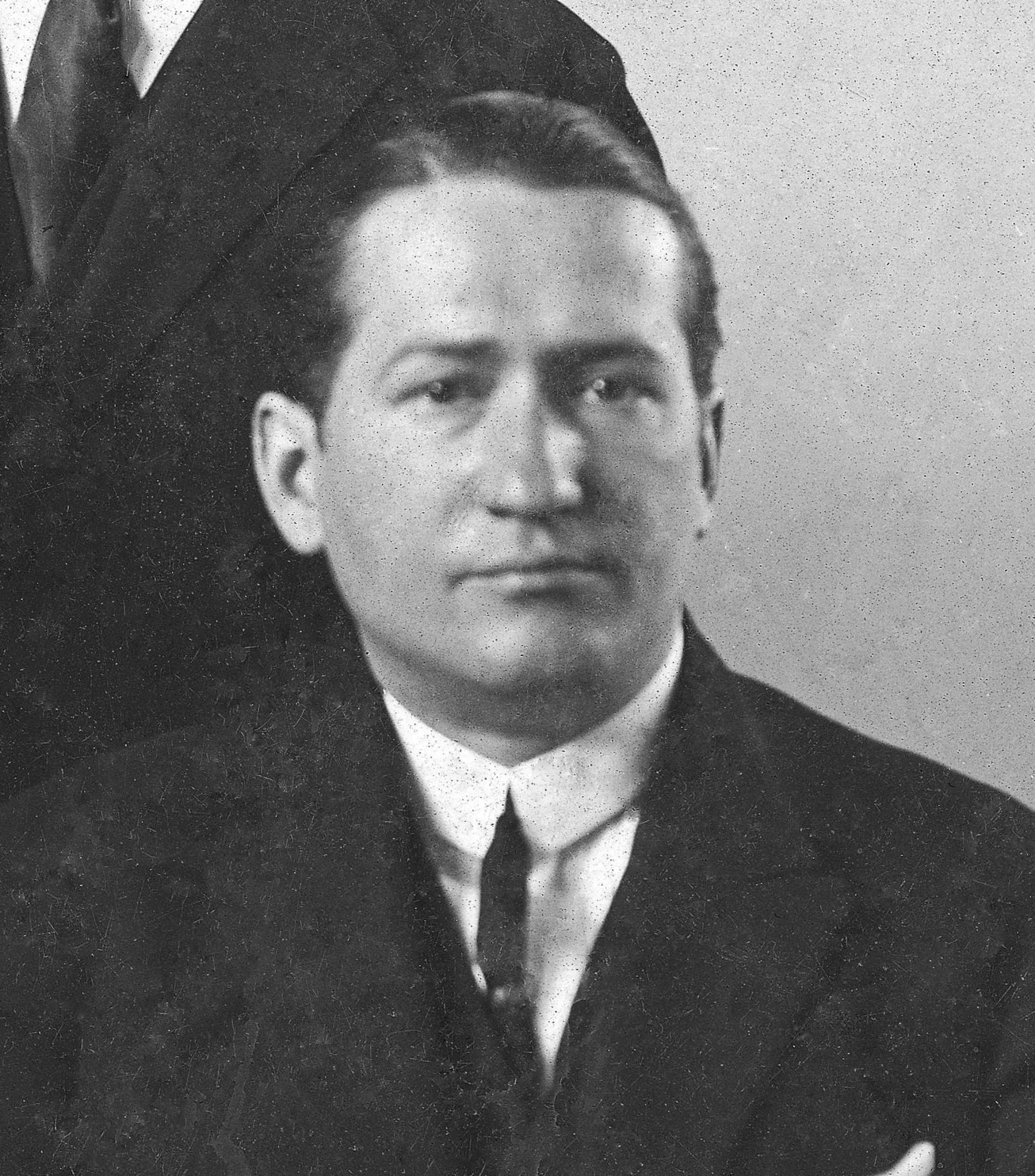
Iwo Gall (1925)

Iwo Gall (born 1 April 1890 in Krakow; died 12 February 1959) was a Polish theater director, stage designer and pedagogue.

== Biography ==
He graduated from the Academy of Fine Arts in Cracow, then studied in Berlin and Vienna, where during World War I he worked with the Polish theater. After the war he worked at the Teatrze im. Juliusza Słowackiego w Krakowie, and then collaborated with Juliusz Osterwa's "Reduta " (mainly as a stage designer). He was the director of the Chamber Theater in Czestochowa (1932-1935). During the Nazi occupation he ran a secret drama studio, which was functioning until the outbreak of the Warsaw Uprising and from April 1945 resumed operations in Cracow.

== Decorations ==
- Order of the Labor Standard II (1949)
- Officer's Cross of the Order of Polonia Restituta (1957)
