= Andrzej Maj =

Polish director (1950–2005)

- Born: September 1, 1950; Kraków
- Died: June 16, 2005 (aged 54)
- Citizenship: Polish
- Education: film director theatre director
- Years active: 1978–1998

Andrzej Maj (1 September 1950 – 16 June 2005) was a Polish film and theatre director active in Kraków, who directed several TV plays.

== Biography ==
He was the son of pharmacologist Jerzy Maj.

He began working as assistant director on the documentary film Druga cisza (The Second Silence) directed by Tadeusz Lis and Maciej Szumowski. In the mid-1970s, he became involved with the Piwnica pod Baranami ensemble. In 1978, he performed in the radio play of the Polish Radio Theater, Doktor Piotr based on Stefan Żeromski's prose, directed by Romana Mater. After leaving Piwnica pod Baranami, he started working at TV Kraków, initially as an assistant, later as a director. From 1979, he started directing plays for the Television Theater. In total, he directed over thirty television performances, which starred, among others, Jerzy Trela, Krystyna Feldman, Anna Dymna, Stanisława Celińska, Dorota Segda, Krzysztof Globisz, Zbigniew Zamachowski, Edward Linde-Lubaszenko, Anna Polony and Danuta Szaflarska. In 1988 he received the Individual Award of the Chairman of the Committee for Radio and TV "for creative director search for new forms in the television theater for children and youth and for directing the performance Torrents of Spring". He was the author of documentary films about Piotr Skrzynecki (1981) and Jerzy Trela (1998). Among authors that inspired him were Witkacy, Witold Gombrowicz and Władysław Hasior.

In the 1980s he was active as a theater director. He directed plays in Ludwik Solski Theatre in Tarnów, Stefan Jaracz Theatre and Nowy Theatre in Łódź.

He died on June 16, 2005. In the last years of his life he was addicted to alcohol. He was buried in the family grave at the Rakowicki Cemetery in Krakow.

He was married to the set designer Krystyna Szczepańska, with whom he collaborated on most of his productions in the 1980s, and later with the actress Aleksandra Konieczna, whom he cast in several of his TV plays. He had two daughters: one of the first, one of the second marriage.

== Filmography ==
- 1979: Cathlen, córka Houlihana (TV play)
- 1981: Zawsze w sobotę czyli pamiętnik Piotra S. (documentary film) about Piotr Skrzynecki
- 1981: My wciąż spieszący (TV play)
- 1981: Kocham cię za to, że cię kochać muszę (TV play)
- 1982: Znana nasza (TV play)
- 1982: Milczeć pogodnie (TV play)
- 1983: Droga do Czarnolasu (TV play)
- 1984: Wiersze i krajobrazy (TV performance)
- 1984: Piękność z Amherst (TV play)
- 1984: Obszar swobody (TV play)
- 1985: Nad wodą wielką i czystą (TV play)
- 1986: Twarze Witkacego, czyli Regulamin Firmy Portretowej (TV play)
- 1986: Koty? Koty! (TV play)
- 1987: Wiosenne wody (TV play)
- 1987: Trąd w pałacu sprawiedliwości (TV play)
- 1987: Kopciuszek (TV play)
- 1988: Tunel (TV play)
- 1989: Idę łąko ku tobie czyli Iłżecki romans Bolesława Leśmiana (TV play)
- 1989: Historia Witolda Gombrowicza (TV play)
- 1990: Spadkobiercy (TV play)
- 1990: Przerwa w podróży (TV play)
- 1990: Minna von Barnhelm (TV play)
- 1991: Przeprowadź mnie przez samotność, starość i śmierć (TV play)
- 1991: Polowanie na kaczki (TV play)
- 1992: Nieporównany Crichton (TV play)
- 1992: Giacomo Joyce (TV play)
- 1993: Obrazki z wystawy (TV play)
- 1994: Abbadon. Anioł zagłady (TV play)
- 1994: Księżniczka na ziarnku grochu (TV play)
- 1995: Anioł (TV play)
- 1996: Nieposłuszna mama (TV play)
- 1996: Biała (TV play)
- 1997: Julian Tuwim - moje słowa (TV play)
- 1998: Jest taki człowiek (documentary film) about Jerzy Trela

== Theatre ==
- 1979: Niebezpieczne związki (Ludwik Solski Theatre, Tarnów)
- 1982: Jednorożec z gwiazd (Stefan Jaracz Theatre, Łódź)
- 1982: Historia, czyli tu wcale nie chodzi o Mozarta (Stefan Jaracz Theatre)
- 1983: Ozimina (Stefan Jaracz Theatre)
- 1984: Legenda (Nowy Theatre, Łódź)
- 1985: Pornografia (Stefan Jaracz Theatre)
