= Karol Radziszewski =

Visual artist (born 1980)

- Born: 1980 (age 45–46); Białystok
- Occupation: Visual artist

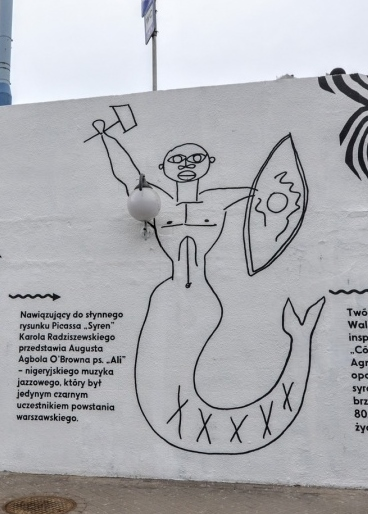
Karol Radziszewski, Syren, 2017, mural, Warszawa

Karol Radziszewski (born 1980) is a contemporary visual artist based in Warsaw.

== Biography ==
He graduated from the Faculty of Painting at the Academy of Fine Arts in Warsaw, in the studio of Jarosław Modzelewski. He is active in the fields of painting, performance art, photography and video art. He founded DIK Fagazine and Queer Archives Institute. He was a member of jury at the Nowe Horyzonty festival, in the art films competition (2013).

== Exhibitions ==
- Biuro, Zachęta, 2005.
- Backstage, 2011, Bunkier Sztuki.
- Potęga sekretów, Ujazdowski, 2019–2020.

== Awards ==
In 2010 he obtained Paszport Polityki. In 2025 he was nominated to Korony Równości, awarded by Kampania Przeciw Homofobii.
