= Zbigniew Raszewski =

Polish writer, including historian (1925–1982)

Zbigniew Raszewski (5 April 1925, Poznań – 7 August 1992) was a Polish writer and theatre historian. The Zbigniew Raszewski Theatre Institute was named in his honor.

Shortly after his birth, his family moved to Bydgoszcz, where he spent his childhood and youth. He wrote one of the best books on the town, and more broadly on Polish–German relations there, in the form of Pamiętnik gapia. Bydgoszcz, jaką pamiętam z lat 1930–1945 Wyd. Pomorze Bydgoszcz., a compendium of memoirs.

From 1945 to 1949, he studied Polish at the University of Poznań (now Adam Mickiewicz University in Poznań, later becoming an assistant at the university.

In 1953 he moved to Warsaw and was involved with the Institute of Art at the Polish Academy of Sciences, as well as becoming a professor at the Zelwerowicz Warsaw Theater School (now Aleksander Zelwerowicz National Academy of Dramatic Art).

== Works ==
- Z tradycji teatralnych Pomorza, Wielkopolski i Śląska 1955
- Teatr ogromny 1961
- Staroświecczyzna i postęp czasu 1963
- Raptularz 1965–1967
- Raptularz 1965–1992
- Raptularz 1968–1969
- Słownik biograficzny teatru polskiego 1973
- Krótka historia Teatru Polskiego 1977
- Bilet do teatru: Szkice
- Bogusławski
- Teatr w świecie widowisk
- Trudny rebus: Studia i szkice z historii teatru
- Weryfikacja czarodzieja i inne szkice o teatrze
- Listy do Małgorzaty Musierowicz
- Mój świat
- Pamiętnik gapia. Bydgoszcz, jaką pamiętam z lat 1930–1945
- Teatr na Placu Krasińskich

== Awards and recognition ==
- 1964: Knight's Cross of the Order of Polonia Restituta
- Bronze Cross of Merit with Swords (1944), Cross of Merit (1955), Cross of the Home Army (1987)

He was also recipient of multiple literary awards.

A documentary, Profesor was released about him posthumously, in 1993.
