= Piotr Cieplak =

Polish stage director (1960–2025)

- Born: 9 May 1960; Częstochowa, Poland
- Died: 7 December 2025 (aged 65); Warsaw, Poland
- Education: National Higher School of Theatre
- Occupation: Stage director

Piotr Andrzej Cieplak (9 May 1960 – 7 December 2025) was a Polish stage director.

Cieplak notably studied at the National Higher School of Theatre and was a longtime member of the Teatr im. Wilama Horzycy w Toruniu.

Cieplak died in Warsaw on 7 December 2025, at the age of 65.

== Awards ==
- Paszport Polityki for Theatre (2001)
- Konrad Swinarski Award (2005, 2012)
- Boy-Żeleński Award (2022)

== Decorations ==
- Gloria Artis Medal for Merit to Culture
  - Silver (2016)
  - Gold (2024)
