= Cyprian Kamil Norwid Theatre =

Coordinates: 52.4086°N 16.9237°E

Norwid Theatre in Jelenia Góra
- Teatr im. Cypriana Kamila Noriwda w Jeleniej Górze
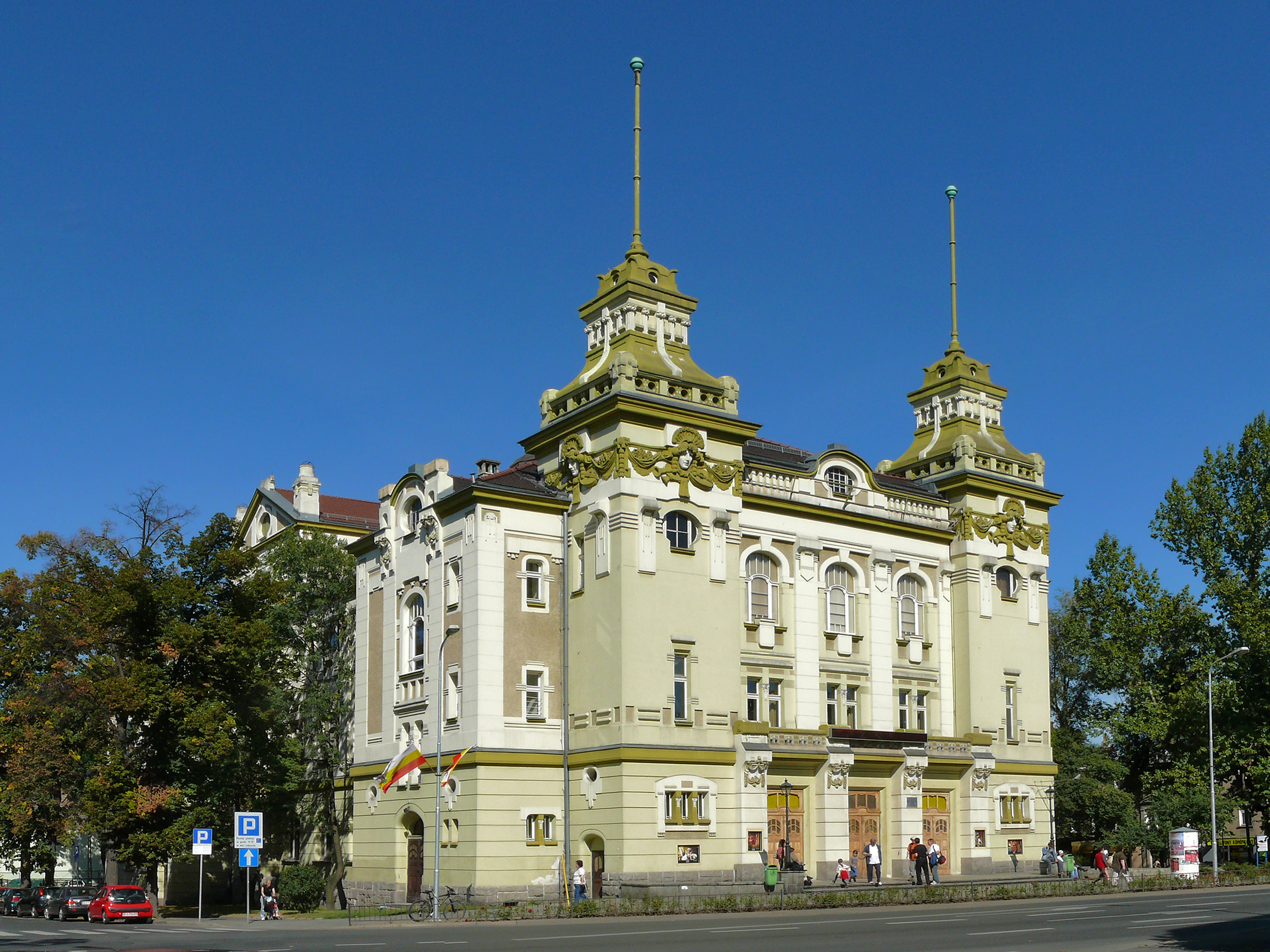
- Entrance to the Cyprian Norwid Theatre
- Interactive map of Norwid Theatre in Jelenia Góra
- Address: Wojska Polskiego St. 36; Jelenia Góra; Poland
- Type: repertory theatre

Construction
- Opened: 1905
- Architect: Alfred Daehmel

Website
- Theatre website

The Cyprian Norwid Theatre in Jelenia Góra (Polish: Teatr im. Cypriana Kamila Norwida w Jeleniej Górze) is a Polish repertory theatre founded in 1945. The Norwid Theatre in Jelenia Góra has two stages: Main Stage (540 seats) and Studio Stage (100 seats). The theatre is named after Cyprian Norwid.

Polish actress and stage director Alina Obidniak was an intendant of the Cyprian Norwid Theatre between 1973 and 1988, as well as in year 2000. Obidniak invited many renowned theatre directors to Jelenia Góra, particularly Krystian Lupa, where he began his directing career with the production of Dainty Shapes and Hairy Apes by Witkacy (1978). She travelled with the theatre's productions across Europe and South America. In 1983, the Cyprian Norwid Theatre co-organised early Festival of Street Theatre in Jelenia Góra.
