= Boris F. Kudlička =

Slovakian designer (born 1972)

Boris F. Kudlička (born 5 December 1972 in Ružomberok, Slovakia) is a theatre, opera, film set, and interior designer. He started his career in Warsaw, Poland and has since gained worldwide renown, foremost for his opera set designs. His "original style" has been characterized as minimalistic and "unconventional, built on contrasts and open to various interpretations".

He has created set designs for the San Francisco Opera, Tokyo's Nikikai Opera, Semperoper Dresden, Vienna State Opera, The Royal Opera London, and Metropolitan Opera News York City, among others. He has also co-developed interior design for Hotel Europejski and the Belvedere restaurant in Warsaw.

Kudlička studied set design at the Faculty of Stage and Costume Design at the Academy of Performing Arts in Bratislava from 1990 to 1996. He also studied at the Minerva Academy of Fine Arts in Groningen, the Netherlands.
