= Kornblumenblau =

1989 Polish film

- Directed by: Leszek Wosiewicz
- Written by: Leszek Wosiewicz
- Starring: Adam Kamień
- Release date: 9 October 1989
- Running time: 88 minutes
- Country: Poland
- Language: Polish

Kornblumenblau is a 1989 Polish drama film directed by Leszek Wosiewicz. The film was selected as the Polish entry for the Best Foreign Language Film at the 62nd Academy Awards, but was not accepted as a nominee.

== Cast ==
- Adam Kamień as Tadeusz
- Marcin Troński as Moskwa
- Piotr Skiba as Włodek
- Krzysztof Kolberger as Blokowy
- Wiesław Wójcik as Blokowy
- Marek Chodorowski as Szef
- Zygmunt Bielawski as Blokowy
- Ewa Błaszczyk as Komendantowa
- Erwin Nowiaszek as Szef
- Jerzy Rogulski as Strażnik

== See also ==
- List of submissions to the 62nd Academy Awards for Best Foreign Language Film
- List of Polish submissions for the Academy Award for Best Foreign Language Film
