= Strach =

Strach is a Czech surname meaning 'fear'. It could have originated from the fearful behaviour of the bearer, but also as a shortened form of the name Strachota. Notable people with the surname include:

- Jiří Strach (born 1973), Czech film director and actor
- Šárka Strachová (born 1985), Czech alpine ski racer
