= Krystian Lupa =

Polish theatre director (born 1943)

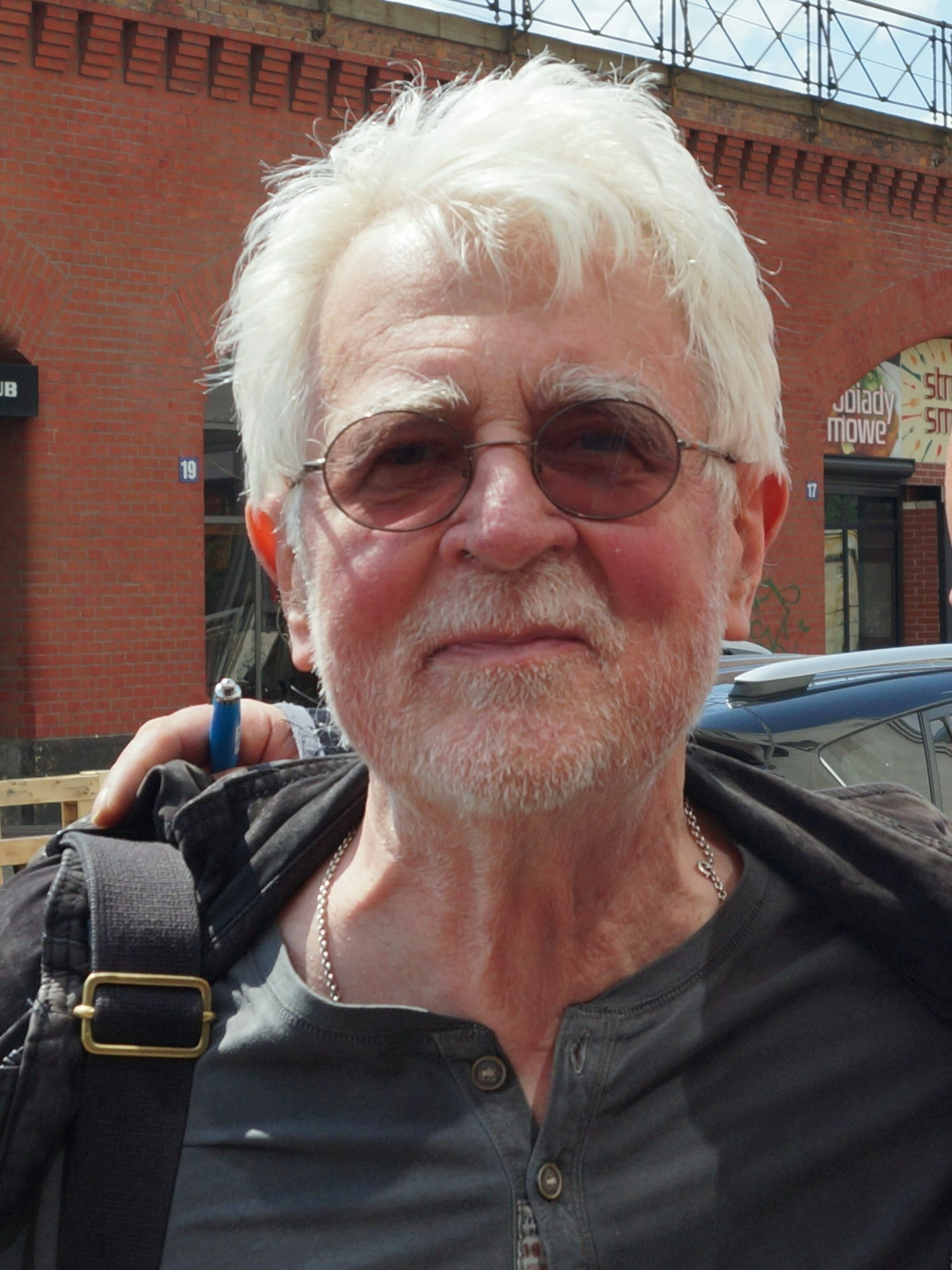
- Lupa in 2016
- Born: 7 November 1943 (age 82); Jastrzębie-Zdrój, Poland
- Education: Ludwik Solski Academy for the Dramatic Arts
- Occupation: stage director
- Years active: 1977–present
- Partner: Piotr Skiba
- Awards: Swinarski Award (1988); Leon Schiller Award (1992); Witkacy Prize – Critics' Circle Award (2000); Europe Theatre Prize (2009); Nestroy Theatre Prize (2014)
- Honours: Order of Polonia Restituta; Gloria Artis Medal for Merit to Culture; Ordre des Arts et des Lettres; Austrian Decoration for Science and Art

Krystian Lupa (Polish pronunciation: [ˈkrɨstjan ˈlupa]; born 7 November 1943) is a Polish theatre director, set designer, playwright, translator and pedagogue. He has been called "the greatest living European theatre director".

He is the recipient of many national and international honours including the Austrian Decoration for Science and Art (2001), Ordre des Arts et des Lettres (2002), and the Commander's Cross of the Order of Polonia Restituta (2017).

== Life and work ==
He studied physics at the Jagiellonian University in Kraków, between 1963 and 1969 he studied graphics at the Kraków Academy of Fine Arts, also film directing at the National Higher School of Film in Łódź and finally, theatre directing at the Ludwik Solski Academy for the Dramatic Arts. After graduation, he worked at the Cyprian Kamil Norwid Theatre in Jelenia Góra. In Łódź, he started to collaborate with Konrad Swinarski, and was influenced by the works of Tadeusz Kantor. In 1976, he made his debut as a director by staging Sławomir Mrożek's play The Slaughterhouse at the Juliusz Słowacki Theatre in Kraków where he worked for many years. In this period, he explored in his works the spiritual condition of man in the era of deep cultural transformation. In 1986, he became the director of the National Stary Theatre in Kraków.

Lupa is renowned for his specific methods of working with the text and actors in a very organic way also known as "laboratory rehearsals". He is known to translate and adapt the texts which he stages, at the same time designing the scenery and directing these productions. Occasionally, he appears on stage himself as the narrator.

During his career he made a lot of notable productions based on texts of Robert Musil, Thomas Bernhard, Fyodor Dostoyevsky, Rainer Maria Rilke, Stanisław Ignacy Witkiewicz, Maxim Gorky or Witold Gombrowicz.

He was awarded with numerous prominent awards which include Witkacy Prize – Critics' Circle Award, Gold Gloria Artis Medal, Order of Polonia Restituta, Ordre des Arts et des Lettres, Europe Theatre Prize and Austrian Decoration for Science and Art. In 2014, he received the Nestroy Theatre Prize for the staging of Thomas Bernhard's 1986 novel Woodcutters. He also received two nominations to Poland's top literary prize, the Nike Award, in 2002 for Labirynt and in 2004 for Podglądania.

In 2016, he received the Golden Cross of the Stage Award in Lithuanina for staging Thomas Bernhard's play 'Heldenplatz' (Heroes' Square) in Lithuanian National Drama Theatre. In 2017, he became a member of the Polish Academy of Arts and Sciences. The same year, he created an adapted stage play, Mo Fei, combining several works by author Shi Tiesheng. Mo Fei premiered as the original play in the Tianjin Grand Theatre during the Lin Zhaohua Theatre Invitational Exhibition.

=== Controversy ===
In June 2023, his play The Emigrants, based on the novel by W.G. Sebald, was cancelled by the Comédie de Genève and Festival d'Avignon as the director faced allegations of verbally abusing a number of team members involved in the project. The reason behind the cancellation was cited as "differences over the work philosophy". Lupa later apologized for his behaviour but at the same time noted the lack of efforts to discuss the matter and reach a compromise.

== Europe Theatre Prize ==
In 2009, he was awarded the XIII Europe Theatre Prize, in Wrocław. The prize organization stated:

The awarding of the 13th Europe Theatre Prize to Krystian Lupa, confirms Poland's pivotal role on the European theatre scene. A pupil of Tadeusz Kantor, and himself a teacher of many artists – among whom we should mention Krzysztof Warlikowski, 10th Europe Prize Theatrical Realities – Krystian Lupa combines an academic training with an inexhaustible creative vein that has always been present in and distinguished his work, and has enabled him in the course of his career to take on and ingeniously adapt for the theatre the works of classic literary authors such as Robert Musil, Feyodor Dostoevsky, Rainer Maria Rilke, Thomas Bernhardt, Anton Cechov, Werner Schwab, Mikhail Bulgakov, Friedrich Nietzsche.

== Personal life ==
In 2008, he publicly came out as gay in an interview for Film magazine. His life partner is actor Piotr Skiba. In the 1960s, he was a member of the hippie movement and was in a relationship with painter Zbysław Marek Maciejewski (1946–1999).

== See also ==
- Theatre of Poland
- Jerzy Grotowski
