= Juliusz Osterwa =

Polish actor, thatre director and art theoretician

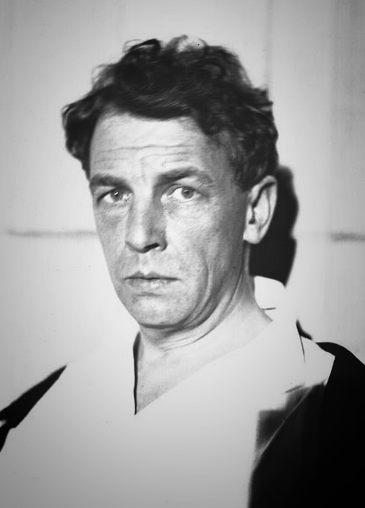
- Juliusz Osterwa in his 1931 role of Konrad from the play by Stanisław Wyspiański
- Born: Julian Andrzej Maluszek; 23 June 1885; Kraków
- Died: 10 May 1947 (aged 61); Warsaw, Poland
- Occupations: Actor, theatre director
- Years active: 1918–1946

Juliusz Osterwa, born Julian Andrzej Maluszek (23 June 1885 – 10 May 1947), was a renowned Polish actor, theatre director and art theoretician active in the interwar period. He was the founder of Theatre Reduta, the first experimental stage in Warsaw following Poland's return to independence at the end of World War One. Osterwa began his Warsaw career at the age of 33 by staging the works of Poland's revolutionary dramatists including Juliusz Słowacki, Stanisław Wyspiański, Stefan Żeromski, Jerzy Szaniawski, Kazimierz Przerwa-Tetmajer, and Cyprian Norwid. This team was commonly known as the actor's commune, resembling an ascetic monastery devoted to spiritual practice.

== Career ==
Osterwa began his theatre career in 1904 in Kraków, at the Ludowy Theatre run by actor Stefan Jaracz during the Partitions. He was performing at the Zielony Balonik literary cabaret. Osterwa travelled extensively in the 1920s with his Reduta troupe. In mere 900 days they performed over 1,500 times in 173 Polish cities. In 1925, the Reduta Theatre visited Latvia. In 1931 Osterwa settled back in Warsaw and a year later, assumed the role of a director at the grand Juliusz Słowacki Theatre in Kraków. He went back to touring with Reduta across the country in 1935. Following the 1939 invasion of Poland by Nazi Germany and the Soviet Union, Osterwa was active in the underground education but also became ill. He performed for the last time in 1946 following the Soviet takeover, in the title role of Fanatazy by Słowacki in his Kraków theatre. He died a year later in Warsaw.
