= Iain Tuckett =

Iain Tuckett MBE is a regeneration and community housing pioneer in London, England.

== Early life ==
Iain Tuckett was a pupil at Bryanston School in Dorset, and then studied at the University of Bristol.

== Career ==
Tuckett is Executive Director of Coin Street Community Builders (CSCB). He has been very active in the redevelopment of the South Bank of the River Thames in central London, in a 13-acre (53,000 m^{2}) area between Waterloo Bridge and Blackfriars Bridge. He is deputy chairman of the South Bank Employers’ Group and honorary secretary of Thames Festival Trust, Coin Street Centre Trust, Colombo Street Community & Sports Centre, and Coin Street Secondary Housing Co-operative. He is also a board member of the Young Vic Theatre and the North Lambeth & North Southwark Sports Action Zone.

Iain Tuckett was awarded an Honorary Fellowship at London South Bank University in 2004 for his service to the local community. He was awarded an MBE in the January 2013 New Years Honours List.
