= Leeds Playhouse =

Theatre in Leeds, England

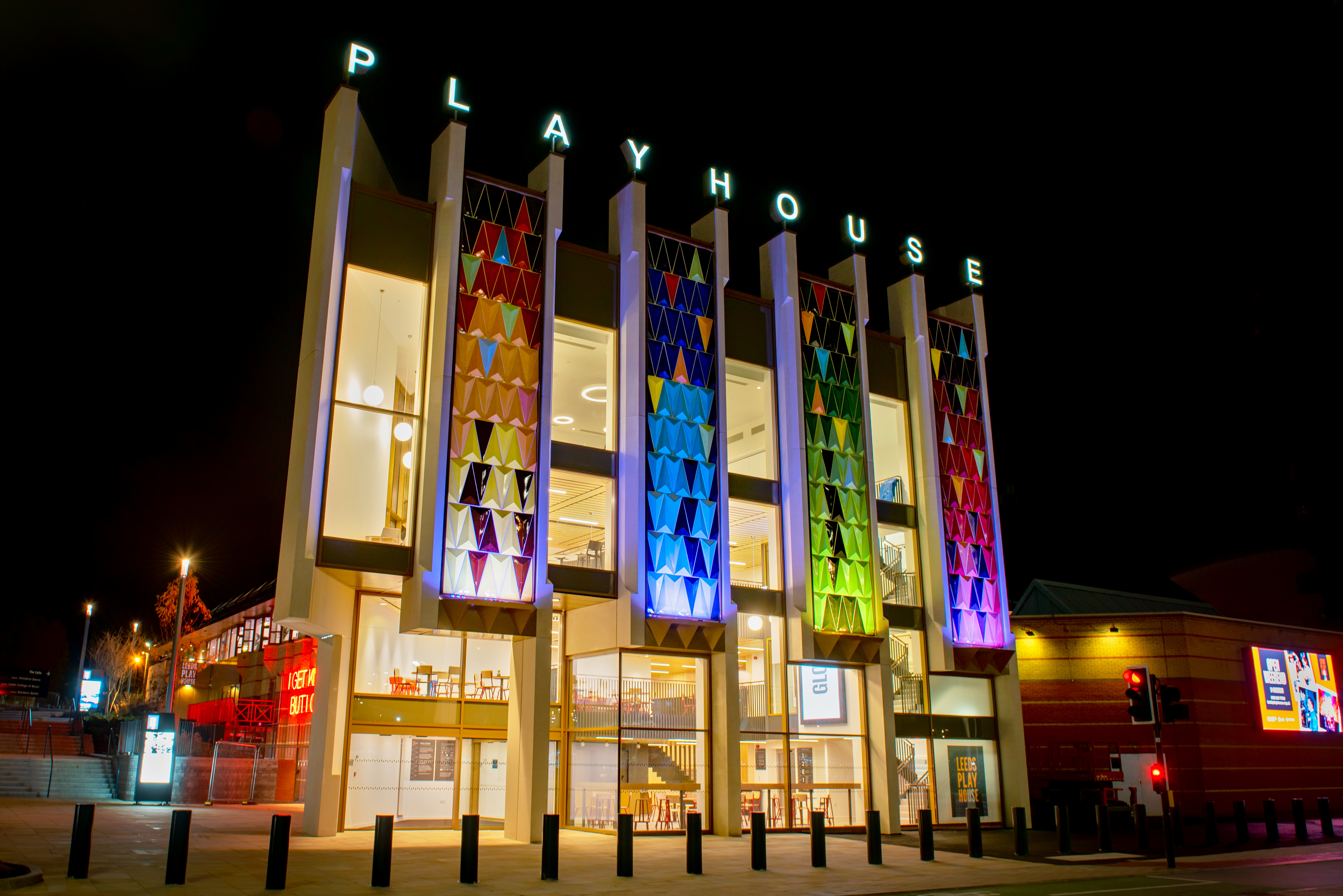
- Interactive map of Leeds Playhouse
- Address: Playhouse Square, Quarry Hill, Leeds; LS2 7UP; West Yorkshire; England
- Coordinates: 53.79819°N 1.53428°W
- Owner: Leeds Theatre Trust Ltd (Registered charity 255460)
- Capacity: Quarry Theatre 750; Courtyard Theatre 350

Construction
- Opened: March 1990

Website
- www.leedsplayhouse.org.uk

Leeds Playhouse is a theatre in the city centre of Leeds, West Yorkshire, England. It opened in 1990 in the Quarry Hill area of the city as the West Yorkshire Playhouse, successor to the original Leeds Playhouse, and was rebranded in June 2018 to revert to the title "Leeds Playhouse". It has two auditoria and a studio space, hosts a wide range of productions, and engages in outreach work in the local community.

== History ==
The origins of Leeds Playhouse lie in the Leeds Playgoers' Society, founded in 1907 as an off-shoot of the Leeds Arts Club, to stage contemporary drama by writers such as Shaw, Ibsen and Chekhov, and hold lectures and discussions on contemporary drama. The idea of creating a Leeds Playhouse dates from 1964, when a campaign was started for a permanent home for modern and contemporary theatre in Leeds. Despite some opposition from the local council on the grounds that Leeds already had a theatre (the Grand Theatre), a public appeal was launched to raise funds at a mass meeting in Leeds Town Hall on 5 May 1968. The meeting was addressed by Peter O'Toole, Keith Waterhouse, and the actor and joint artistic director of Nottingham Playhouse, John Neville, amongst others. £20,000 was raised by public subscription, but the project still needed support from Leeds City Council. The Council eventually promised £25,000, and £5,000 annually if necessary. This, along with grants from the Arts Council and the Gulbenkian Foundation, meant that the project could go ahead and the Leeds Playhouse opened in 1970 in premises loaned to the Leeds Theatre Trust by the University of Leeds. The first performance was held on Wednesday 16 September 1970 with Tony Robinson, who later went on to play Baldrick in the television series Blackadder, starring as Simon in Alan Plater's play Simon Says, directed by Bill Hays. The following month Robinson also appeared in The Merry Wives of Windsor by William Shakespeare, where he played Abraham Slender.

The Leeds Playhouse turned into the West Yorkshire Playhouse in March 1990 when it relocated to the Quarry Hill area of the city as part of a major regeneration scheme. In June 2018, it rebranded as Leeds Playhouse once again in response to the development and growth of Leeds City region and also Leeds City Council's longstanding support for the theatre in Leeds.

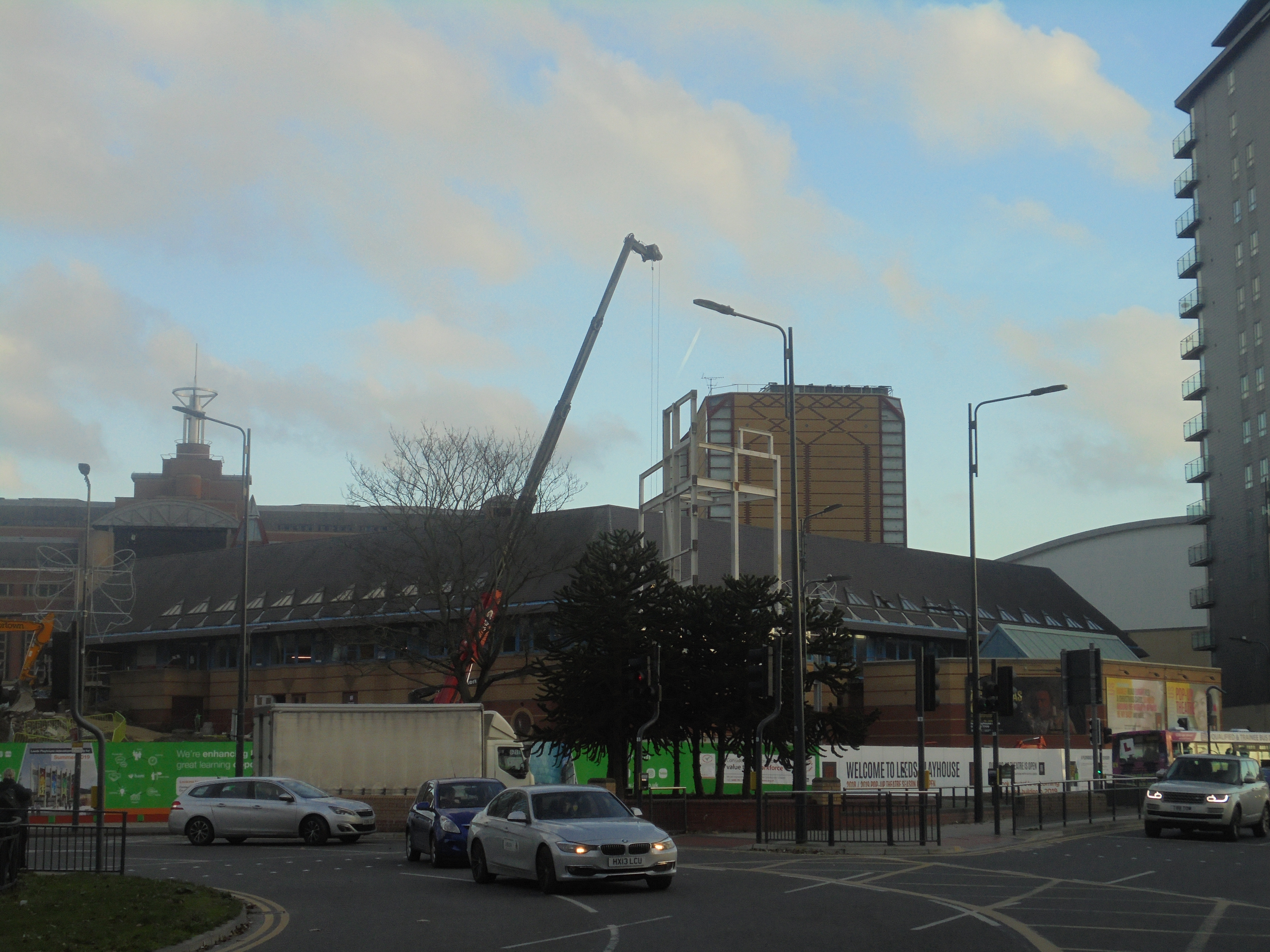
Redevelopment at Leeds Playhouse (13 December 2018)

== Building ==
Leeds Playhouse was designed by The Appleton Partnership architects of Edinburgh. The complex comprises: The Quarry Theatre (750 seats), The Courtyard Theatre (350 seats), a CAMRA award-winning bar, a restaurant, the Newlyn Gallery, two function rooms (the Congreve Room and the Priestley Room), three rehearsal spaces, a recording studio, extensive technical workshops, dressing rooms, a costume hire department and offices for production, administrative and artistic teams. The foundation stone was laid by Judi Dench in 1989, and on completion it was opened by Diana Rigg. The theatre was completed at a cost of £13 million.

The building underwent a £16.8 million redevelopment in 2019: creating a new foyer, improving access throughout the building, moving the front of the building to face the city and creating the Bramall Rock Void studio space (130 seats).

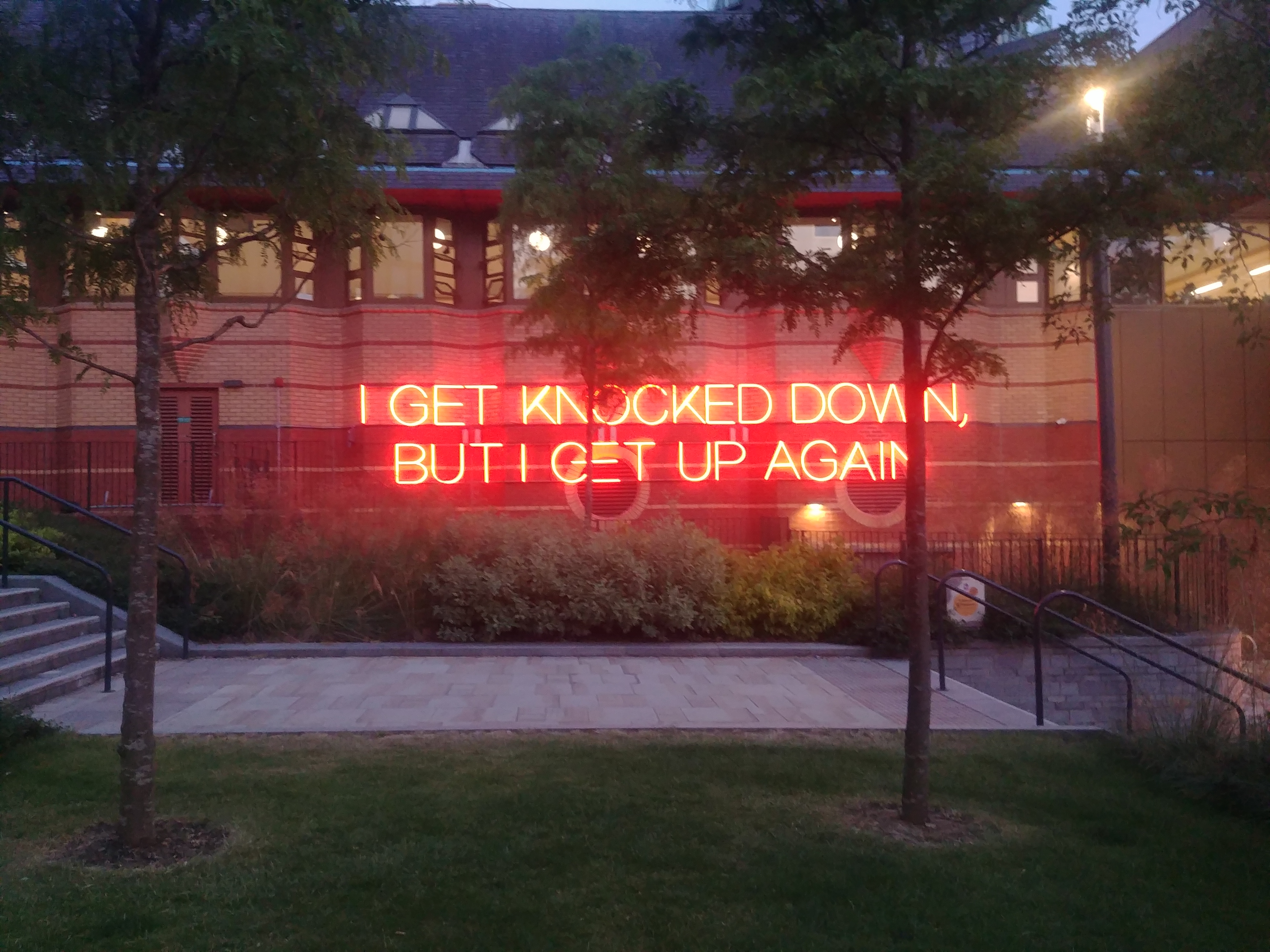
"I get knocked down but I get up again."

The playhouse has a large neon sculpture on its exterior which spells out the lyric from the song "Tubthumping" by Chumbawamba: "I get knocked down but I get up again".

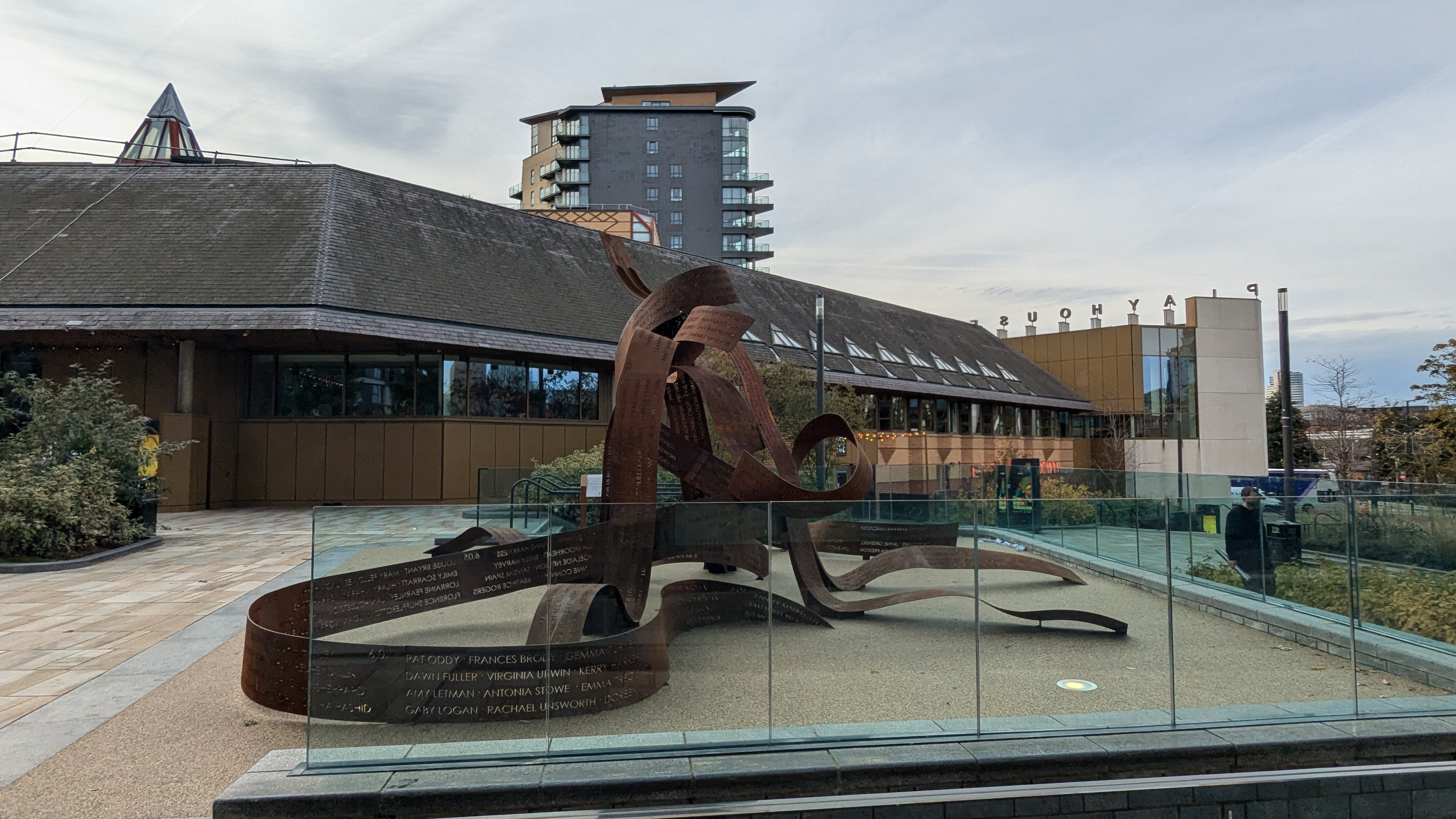
Ribbons by Pippa Hale, with Playhouse behind

The sculpture Ribbons by artist Pippa Hale is next to the theatre, which was a partner in the development of the work, which commemorates women of Leeds.

== Productions ==
According to the Leeds Playhouse website it has established a reputation both nationally and internationally as one of Britain's most exciting producing theatres, winning awards for everything from its productions to its customer service, and it is "the largest regional repertory theatre in the UK outside London and Stratford". The theatre's first artistic director was Jude Kelly (1990–2002). Her successor was Ian Brown who ran the theatre until passing the baton to James Brining in the autumn of 2012.

Productions cover a wide range from classic drama to modern European theatre and children's shows. There is an emphasis on new writing, especially from the north of England. There are many coproductions with other regional theatres, some of which go on to tour or transfer to London theatres. Visiting companies include Northern Broadsides, Kneehigh Theatre and Peepolykus.

The theatre was home to the original version of the musical Spend Spend Spend, the story of the life of Viv Nicholson, the 1961 famous Pools winner and author of the book of the same name. The original, starring Rosemary Ashe appeared at the Playhouse before it went on to West End success starring Barbara Dickson.

A typical season includes four or five major productions which run for three or four weeks, and a number of one-week or shorter runs which may be by visiting companies. A typical recent season (Autumn-Winter 2007) included: Casanova by Carol Ann Duffy and Told By An Idiot, with Lyric Hammersmith; a stage adaptation of Don Quixote; Brief Encounter with Kneehigh Theatre and Birmingham Repertory Theatre; Rough Crossings adapted by Caryl Phillips from Simon Schama's book; Salonika, first performed at the Royal Court Theatre in 1982. There were 6 plays with shorter runs, a visiting production by Northern Ballet Theatre, and two Christmas shows, one for small children and a revived co-production with Birmingham Repertory Company of Adrian Mitchell's dramatisation of The Lion, the Witch and the Wardrobe. Tony Harrison's satyr play The Trackers of Oxyrhynchus was performed at the theatre in 1998. The playhouse has a strong record of supporting new writers, like Zodwa Nyoni, whose first play Boi Boi Is Dead they commissioned.

== Financial support ==
The theatre receives funding from Arts Council England (£1,500,000) and Leeds City Council (£670,000). It also encourages corporate sponsorship. The theatre is a member of the European Theatre Convention.
