= Sea Containers House =

Building in London

Coordinates: 51.5085°N 0.1070°W

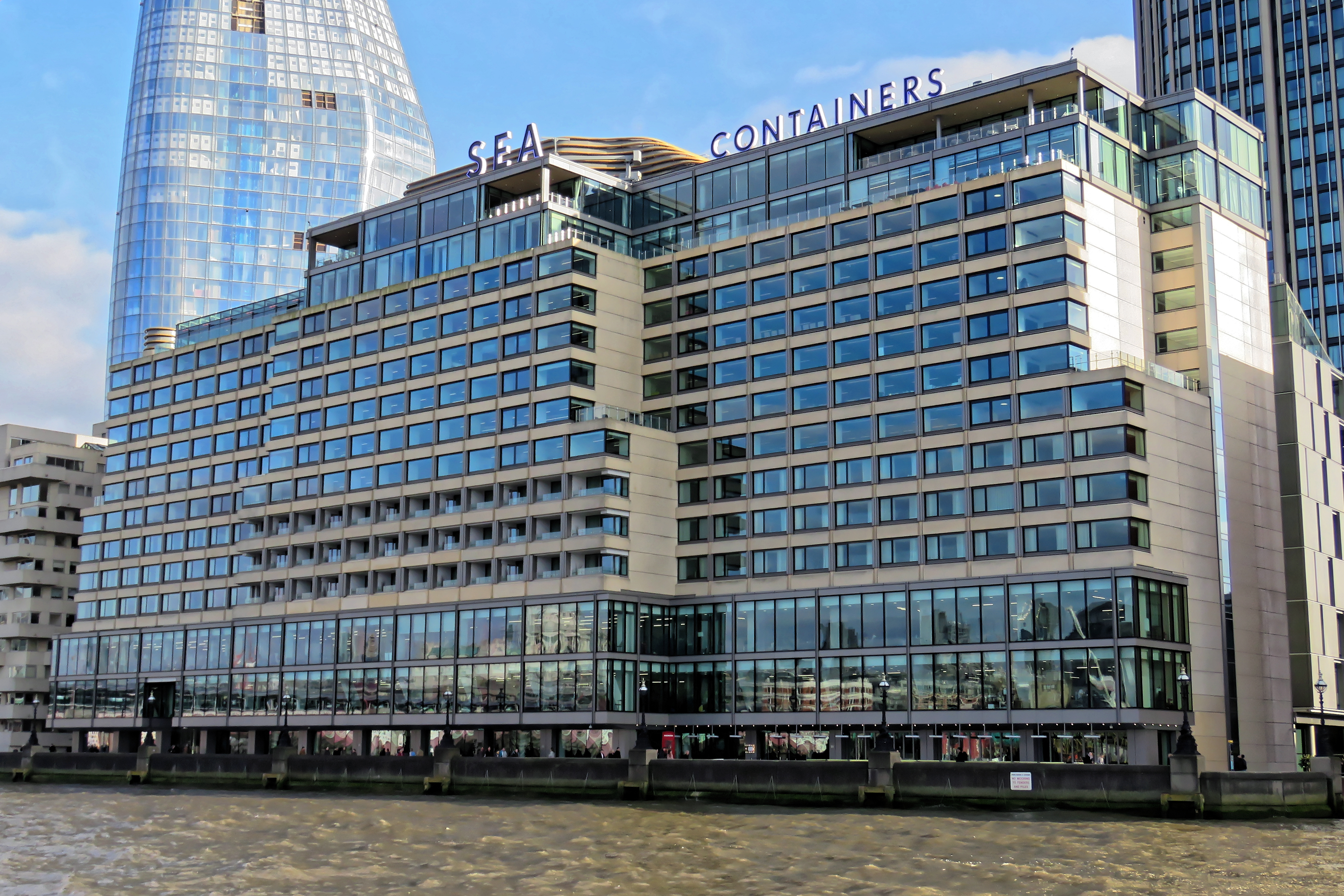
Sea Containers House on the River Thames, in 2018

Sea Containers House is a prominent building on the south bank of the River Thames, west of Blackfriars Bridge, in London.

== Location ==
Sea Containers House is located towards the eastern end of London's South Bank cultural area, and is within the London Borough of Southwark. A continuous river-side walkway, actually part of the Thames Path, passes in front of and below the building, and links it with near river-side attractions such as the Festival Hall, the National Theatre, the Tate Modern, the Globe Theatre and the adjacent Oxo Tower.

== History ==
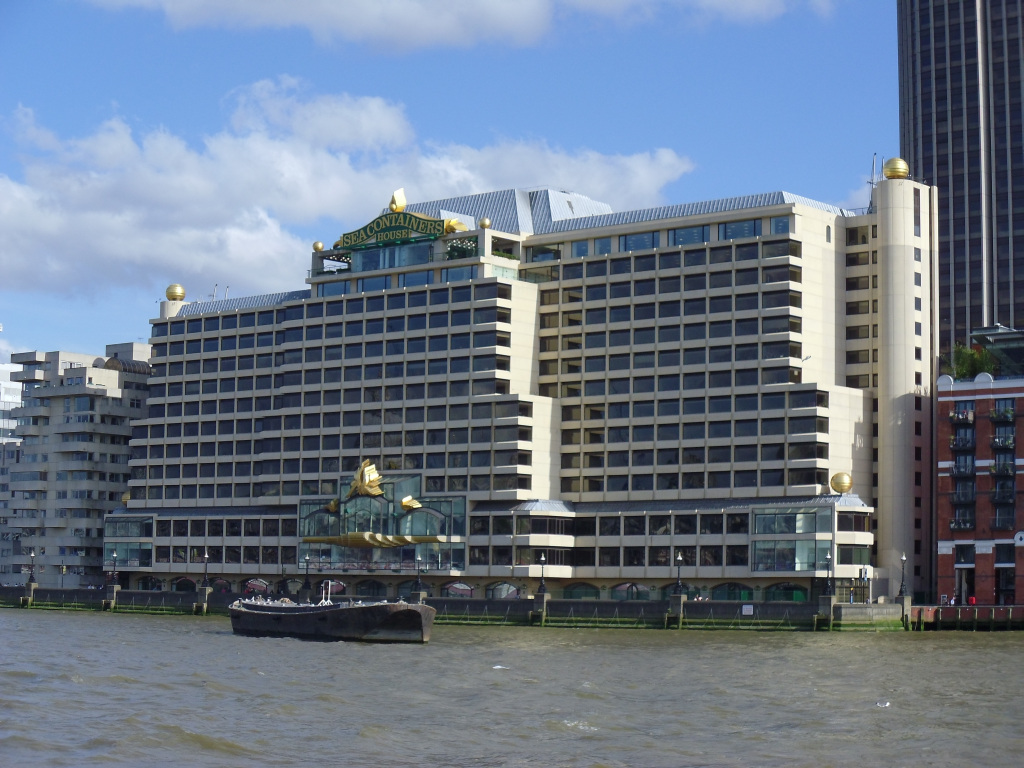
Sea Containers House in 2011, prior to redevelopment

Sea Containers House was designed by noted American Modernist architect Warren Platner in 1974 as a luxury hotel. During construction, however, its location near the City of London led to the decision to complete it instead as office space. It opened in 1978 and took its name from the former long-term tenant, Sea Containers.

In Spring 2011, a process began to gain planning permission for an extensive internal and external refurbishment of Sea Containers House. The east and west wings, which face the Thames, remained offices, with companies within global communications group WPP moving in February 2016. The south wing was renovated as the Mondrian Hotel London, which opened on 30 September 2014, bringing at least part of the building back to its original intended use. The hotel became independent and was renamed Sea Containers London Hotel on 15 January 2019.

== Cultural influence ==
In October 2009, three-piece music band Gyratory System released the album The Sound-Board Breathes with a track named "Sea Containers House".

== Sea Containers London ==
In January 2019, Mondrian London became Sea Containers London, an independent hotel managed by the Lore Group.

The hotel has 354 rooms and suites with a 1920s cruise liner design.

On-site are the agua Spa, the 56-seat Curzom Cinema and three restaurants and bars. These are the Sea Containers Restaurant, Lyaness and 12th Knot.

=== Hotel Design ===
The hotel's design was done by Creative Director, Jacu Strauss who used a nautical theme with Art Deco elements and designer furnitures by Tom Dixon.

The hotel lobby has a contemporary sculpture that is a collaboration of Jan Hendzel, Maya Laud and Jacu Strauss.

In April 2025, the hotel launched four new cabin suites that focus on sustainability with recycled plastic tabletops and counters and vintage furniture from Vinterior.

=== Lyaness ===
The hotel's cocktail bar, Lyaness is part of Ryan Chetiyawardana's, aka Mr. Lyan's portfolio. It won the Best International Hotel Bar category at the 16th Annual Spirited Awards® in 2022.

=== Awards & Recognition ===
In 2019, the hotel won at the Blue Badge Access Awards for their designer approach to accessibility.

In 2024, Lore Group that operates the hotel joined the Global Hotel Alliances.

In 2025, Sea Containers London was voted one of the top hotels in London at the Conté Nest Reader's Choice Awards.
