= Belarus Free Theatre =

Belarusian underground theatre group

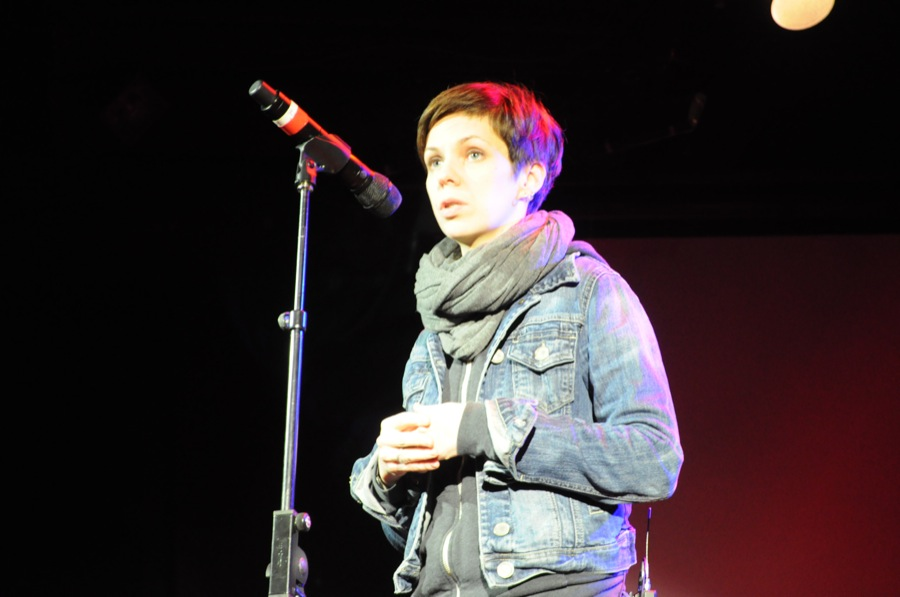
- Natalia Koliada at a benefit in New York City, January 2011.
- Formation: March 2005
- Type: Theatre group
- Location: Belarus
- Website: belarusfreetheatre.com

The Belarus Free Theatre (Belarusian: Свабодны тэатр, Svabodny teatr) is a Belarusian underground theatre group.

Following the 2020–2021 Belarusian protests, the BFT no longer has any presence in Belarus, with the remaining members leaving in October 2020 to join artistic directors Khalezin and Koliada (living in exile since 2011) in London. As of 2023, under the current political system in Belarus the Belarus Free Theatre has no official registration, no premises, nor any other facilities. When the theater was still in Belarus, rehearsals and performances (always free of charge for the public) were normally held secretly in small private apartments, which, due to security and the risk of persecution, had to be changed constantly. On several occasions, performances were given in street cafes and in the countryside, in the woods. Staff members have been repeatedly harassed by the authorities. The stage director and other people were sacked from their jobs at state-run theatres.

== History ==
The group was established in March 2005 by human rights activists Nikolai Khalezin, playwright and journalist, and Natalia Koliada, a theatre producer and Khalezin's wife. The theatre was meant to be an artistic form of resisting the pressure and censorship of the authoritarian regime of president Alexander Lukashenko in Belarus.

In May 2005 the team was joined by stage director Vladimir Shcherban, who has produced the majority of Free Theatre performances. Currently the theatre's staff consists of ten professional actors, one professional dramatist, four managers and two technical assistants.

The troupe's first production was 4.48 Psychosis, by the late British playwright Sarah Kane (1971–1999), which deals with "depression and suicide –– two themes that are taboo in state-controlled Belarusian art." The performance was directed by Vladimir Shcherban, and the premiere took place on 28 May 2005 in one of Minsk clubs.

According to the website of the European Theatre Convention, "Since May 2005 the Free Theatre has produced seven performances based on thirteen plays. About 5,000 people attended performances of the Free Theatre in Belarus and more than 4,000 abroad during the first two years of existence. Free Theatre attracts other representatives of Belarusian underground culture in the variety of fields, such as independent music, art, photography, cinematography."

On 8 February 2006, Steven Lee Myers reported in The New York Times that "The theater ... performs in private apartments and in places that are not openly advertised –– and, increasingly, abroad, where it is drawing international attention and support from prominent playwrights, including Tom Stoppard and Václav Havel."

The Free Theatre performed its original theatrical work Being Harold Pinter at the mid-April 2007 conference "Artist and Citizen: 50 Years of Performing Pinter, in Leeds, England, during which British playwright and 2005 Nobel Laureate Harold Pinter participated in the after-performance discussion. During the conference, there were scheduled screenings for conferees of the video of Square (Ploshcha), a documentary film about the situation in Belarus. Michael Billington — Pinter's official biographer and theatre critic of The Guardian — wrote a laudatory account of the performance of Being Harold Pinter and the Free Theatre in his Guardian Online "Theatre Blog" on 16 April 2007, from the conference, observing that "A new production by the Belarus Free Theatre reinforces the global resonance of the British playwright's political works."

Afterward, the Free Theatre went on to the European Theatre Convention (ETC) in Thessaloniki, Greece, site of the 11th Europe Theatre Prize conference (26–29 April 2007), and, the ETC invited the Free Theatre to join it, waiving membership fees: "In April 2007, Belarus Free Theatre became a full member of the European Theatre Convention," according to the ETC website, and in May 2007 "a member of [the] international network Trans European Halls."

Fewer than three weeks after meeting with former Czech President Václav Havel on 4 August 2007, at his country cottage in the Czech Republic on 22 August 2007, during the Free Theatre's première of Edward Bond's theatrical piece Eleven Vests, "special forces from the Belarusian police stormed the performance by the Belarus 'Free Theatre' in a private apartment in Minsk," and "Actors, directors, and audience members," including its director Khalezin, "were arrested"; though subsequently released, "the theatre's founder Nikolai Khalezin is still pretty shaken up," having stated: "'Police used to burst into our performances with machine guns but they disappeared just as fast. A mass arrest like this is a first.'" According to Petz, "Khalezin thinks that this is a concerted effort on the part of the police, the special forces OMON and the secret service KGB 'to exert pressure'." Though Khalezin himself "is used to" such harassment in the past, he stated (as qtd. by Petz), "'But now it's affecting those who have never been arrested before. I'm afraid that some of them won't come back.'" Regardless of all the intentions of special forces to stop the premiere, the performance took place the next day in one of the private houses outside of Minsk. Police were taking video of the event from the forest.

On 19 December 2010, fifty thousand people went into the streets to protest what they believed to be the rigged election of Alexander Lukashenko. More than a thousand of those were beaten and arrested, including Artistic Director Natalia Koliada, other members of the theatre, and prominent artists and poets. At the Belarus Embassy in London, dozens of leaders from the artistic community, including Ian McKellen, protested the arrests, bringing international attention. Natalia Koliada was released, while Nikolai Khalezin went into hiding, where he remains.

== Aims ==
Khalezin, who is also a dramatist himself, having become "famous with his piece 'Ja prishel' (Here I am) which gleaned many international awards," observes that "'All theatres in Belarus are state-owned ... The directors and creative directors are appointed by the Ministry of Culture. The performances are censored, the programs are old and musty. We want to offer an alternative, a modern theatre that discusses social problems with a degree of creative freedom.'"

According to its website, "the main aim" of the performances of the Free Theatre is to "break through stereotypes of the Belarusian population that are imposed by the ideological system of Belarusian dictatorial regime."

"Belarus Free Theatre will exist as long as it is creatively alive", says Nikolai Khalezin.

Members of the Belarus Free Theatre and other Belarusian dissidents cite Václav Havel and the 1989 Velvet Revolution in the former Czechoslovakia, Polish theatre, and other Eastern European protest movements of the 1960s and '70s as inspirations and models for their artistic resistance as part of the status quo in Belarus.

== Activities ==
- "implementation of educational master-classes by the leading theatrical figures of Europe, USA and Russia for the young Belarusian dramaturges and scenarists";
- "organizing the International Contest of modern dramaturgy 'Free Theatre' and publishing the almanac of laureate plays";
- "underground performances of the Belarusian prohibited playwrights and best European and American plays that reflect modern life in all its aspects";
- "public readings of plays of the Belarusian dramatists in Belarus, Russia, Ukraine and the Baltic states, as well as at the leading European theatrical festivals";
- "publishing of collection of the Contemporary Belarusian Dramaturgy";
- "translating the plays of the young Belarusian dramatists into the foreign languages"; and
- "participation in theatre festivals in Europe and the USA." (Official website)

Speaking about the Free Theatre's first production, Sarah Kane's 4.48 Psychosis, its founder Nikolai Khalezin observes that Kane's play "'is about a woman's psychological decay, homosexuality and suicide," and that, while "There's no politics in the play," in it "there is something that is threatening to a dictatorship –– open conversation. The dictatorship says: "We have no suicide, no alcoholism, no drug abuse." And we say: we have to talk if we want to solve problems.'"

Claire Bigg asks: "If the Free Theater has no political agenda, then what makes it so subversive in the eyes of the authorities?" In response, founder "Khalezin says [that] Lukashenka's [sic] authoritarian regime, which he describes as 'collective farm-like,' has failed, unlike the Soviets and the Nazis, to establish an aesthetic platform to promote its doctrines. ... The Belarusian leadership, he says, therefore feels threatened by any form of individual artistic expression that illustrates present-day dilemmas. ... Despite the pressure and obstacles, the Free Theater manages to deliver cutting-edge, effervescent performances –– and Khalezin says the troupe is determined to fight for its right to do so until Lukashenka's [sic] regime comes to an end.

Although also observing that "The project is often referred to as 'political theatre'," Petz stresses that Khalezin himself "definitely does not consider his art political. He says that would be too boring and adds, 'We don't have a single classically political play in our repertoire.' For him, "uprightness" is more important than the classic political play."

== Consequences ==
Such "uprightness", Petz cautions, "comes at a price in Belarus", as "Almost all the members of the ensemble have served time behind bars." Director Vladimir Scherban was "fired by his state employer for being involved with the 'Free Theatre,' as were other actors." Andrei Kolyada, a renowned Belarusian professor and specialist in scenic speech, was fired from Belarusian Academy of Arts for his collaboration with the Belarus Free Theatre.

== Educational project ==
In late 2008 thanks to the financial support of the British Embassy in Belarus the Belarus Free Theatre launched an educational project named "Studio Fortinbras", destined to young Belarusians without theatre experience. In the framework of this project Natalia Koliada and Nikolai Khalezin are themselves lecturers in marketing, management and dramaturgy. The declared aim of the studio is the "forming of universal creator: a person who will know how to do everything – write, stage, perform – and will be able to propose the realization of his artistic product in any country of the world". It is specified that "the Belarusian "Free theatre" is only interested in education of personnel who will work exclusively inside its own collective". In December 2009 the managers of the theatre announced a new recruitment in the studio, having declared, that out of 30 students admitted from the beginning of the project "Fortinbras" almost all of them were "eliminated". International professionals in theatre marketing, management and dramaturgy come to Minsk with workshops. Apart from that Belarus Free Theatre holds educational workshops on contemporary theatre abroad.

== International support ==
Famous playwrights like Tom Stoppard, Harold Pinter, Václav Havel, and Arthur Kopit have supported the Free Theatre, with "Pinter himself ... so enthusiastic about the collage [Being Harold Pinter] that [the Free Theatre] ... assembled from his Nobel Prize for Literature speech, plays and letters from political prisoners in Belarus, that he gave the 'Free Theater' [sic] the rights to his plays for free." Stoppard, who "gave a course in Minsk" two years earlier, stated: "'I wish that all my plays would be performed by a theatre like this,'" becoming "one of the theatre's patrons," along with former Czech President Havel, whom a couple of them visited on 4 August 2007, prior to being "under attack" by the authorities again. On 30 July 2007, before going to the Czech Republic to meet with former President Havel, "The group ... met Rolling Stones singer Mick Jagger in Warsaw," another sponsor. In 2009 Belarus Free Theatre met with Steven Spielberg in DreamWorks Headquarters in LA, USA. Not only do "such famous sponsors bring glamour" to the Free Theatre, according to Petz, but they also afford "protection against even more drastic repressive measures" from the Belarusian authorities. The theatre has also received moral support from free expression charity Index on Censorship, who have lobbied British MPs on the situation in Belarus. In late 2011, the Free Theatre conducted a highly successful crowdfunding campaign on UK-based platform Sponsume to help them continue their activity, banned in Belarus, through their London office. A number of artists, including actor Kevin Spacey supported the Free Theatre's Sponsume campaign.

== Dangerous Acts Starring the Unstable Elements of Belarus ==
The Belarus Free Theatre was the subject of the 2012 documentary Dangerous Acts Starring the Unstable Elements of Belarus. The film was directed and produced by American filmmaker Madeleine Sackler.

== Awards ==
- In April 2008, for the 12th Edition of the Europe Theatre Prize, "a special mention" was "awarded, proposed by Václav Havel, Harold Pinter and Tom Stoppard, to Belarus Free Theatre for their opposition against the oppression of Belarusian Government."
- In 2008, the Belarus Free Theatre received second place for the ArtVenture Freedom to Create Prize.
- The French Republic Award in Defence of Human Rights 2007
- I Love Belarus (2010)

== Europe Theatre Prize ==
In 2008, a Special Mention was awarded to Belarus Free Theatre by the Jury of the X Europe Prize Theatrical Realities, in Thessaloniki, with the following motivation:

We Europeans, over-indulged in culture, have got into the habit of applying a slightly pejorative description to those forms of theatre which do not exclusively conform to what we are used to call ‘art theatre’, for the simple reason that they have a pressing relationship with reality. I have often noticed this in Africa, in connection with what we call ‘action theatre’. And yet this is what our friends from Minsk are practising, with an exceptional determination and an acute sense of what art in a democracy ought to be. And the most extraordinary thing about their adventure is that they should have succeeded in so short a time in creating with each ensuing production a high-quality repertory in the image of their country and their language. They are making art theatre, urgent theatre and survival theatre (which theatre ought in the end to be for all of us) in the middle of the action. For them, the practice of their art, in conditions bordering on the impossible, is as important as breathing. And we know that it is often at the price of their liberty that they enable their fellow-citizens to breathe with them.

Seeing the productions of the Belarus Free Theatre, and coming into contact with their actors, directors, writers and musicians, represents for me a unique experience of theatre as a necessity. In the midst of our lavish and not always dishonourable productions, their arrival on the European landscape comes as a breath of fresh air. May their practice of the essential crafts of theatre be there to make us question our uncertainties for a long time to come!

Jean-Claude Berutti - President, European Theatre Convention, (An Aesthetic of Resistance)

== International support and press reviews ==
- Financial Times: Being Harold Pinter (4****)
- The Daily Telegraph: Being Harold Pinter (5*****)
- The Observer: interview by Stephanie Merritt
- The Sunday Times: Being Harold Pinter (5*****)
- Irish Times: Fiona McCann on Belarus Free Theatre
- The Times: Benedict Nightingale on Belarus Free Theatre
- New York Times: Wilborn Hampton on Belarus Free Theatre
- The Guardian: Mark Ravenhill on Belarus Free Theatre
- Time Out London: Being Harold Pinter/Generation Jeans (4****)
- Thomas Nordanstad: video "A day in the life of Belarus Free Theatre"
- The Guardian: Being Harold Pinter/Generation Jeans (5*****)
- The Guardian: Being Harold Pinter (5*****)
- The Guardian: Michael Billington on Belarus Free Theatre
- The Sunday Times: Being Harold Pinter/Generation Jeans at Soho Theatre (4****)
- WORLD MUSICIANS FOR SOLIDARITY WITH BELARUS: European musicians supported Belarus. Solidarity party in Minsk
- Radio FREEDOM/FREE EUROPE: interview with Nikolai Khalezin
- Appeal in the support of Belarus Free Theatre signed up by more than 100 world-known theatre figures

On 10 February 2008, there was a benefit performance of Being Harold Pinter as part of a Gala Evening at Soho Theatre, in London, staged in Russian with English surtitles, along with Generation Jeans, which Harold Pinter attended; the committee for this Gala Evening was chaired by Sir Tom Stoppard, and the event was "To raise vital funds for the UK presentation of The Belarus Free Theatre and associated contextual events including workshops and platform discussions on censorship and freedom of speech." The production, which was performed from 11 to 23 February 2008, received appreciative press reviews, including 5 stars from Pinter's official authorised biographer Michael Billington, in his Guardian review, and 4 stars from The Times reviewer Sam Marlowe, who observed that "Drama doesn't come more urgently political than in the work of the Belarus Free Theatre."

Being Harold Pinter premiered in Sydney, Australia, at the Belvoir Street Theatre, in Surry Hills, on 6 January 2009, playing there from 6 through 11 and 28 through 31 January and 1 February and at Q Theatre, Penrith, from 14 through 17 January 2009. The production, a part of the Sydney Festival (10–31 January), took on "a particular poignancy" after Pinter's death occurred on 24 December 2008.

== International festivals and tours ==
- Adelaide Festival, Adelaide,
- Christian Benedetti's Theatre-Studio, Paris
- Globe-to-Globe Season, Shakespeare's Globe Theatre, London (King Lear 2012, 2013)
- Hong Kong Art Festival
- Internationale Keuze festival at the Centre for the Performing Arts in Rotterdam, the Netherlands
- Meyerhold Centre, Moscow
- Passages Festival, Nancy
- Soho Theatre, London
- Swedish Royal Theatre, Stockholm
- Theatre-Studio Alfortville, Paris
- Under The Radar, New York

== See also ==
- Belarusian democracy movement
- Censorship in Belarus
- Jeans Revolution
- Polish theatre
- Velvet Revolution
