= CSCB =

CSCB may refer to:

- Coin Street Community Builders, a development trust and social enterprise based in London, England
- The Syndicalist Confederation of Intercultural Communities of Bolivia, a Bolivian farmers' union formerly known as the Syndicalist Confederation of Colonizers of Bolivia
