= Haworth Tompkins =

British architectural firm

Haworth Tompkins Architects

Practice information
- Key architects: Graham Haworth; Steve Tompkins; Toby Johnson
- Founded: 1991
- Location: London

Significant works and honors
- Buildings: Coin Street Neighbourhood Centre (2007); National Theatre Studio (2007); Young Vic Theatre (2006); Royal Court Theatre (2000); Iroko Housing, Coin Street (2001)
- Awards: Stirling Prize (2014); Evening Standard Special Award for Innovative Theatre Architecture (2007); Building Awards, Young Architect of The Year (2001)

Haworth Tompkins is a British architecture studio, formed in 1991 by architects Graham Haworth (b. 1960) and Steve Tompkins (b. 1959).

Based in London, the studio works throughout the public, private and subsidised sectors at a wide spectrum, focusing on theatrical and culturally oriented buildings, and even schools, galleries, housing, offices, shops and factories. The practice employs circa 80 people.

Steve Tompkins is a founder member of Architects Declare, a group of architecture practices pledging to take action on climate change.

In 2024 the founding directors Graham Haworth and Steve Tompkins stood down having transitioned to an employee ownership trust and the business is run by Toby Johnson, managing director, with directors Lucy Picardo, Roger Watts, Joanna Sutherland and Chris Fellner.

== Selected works ==
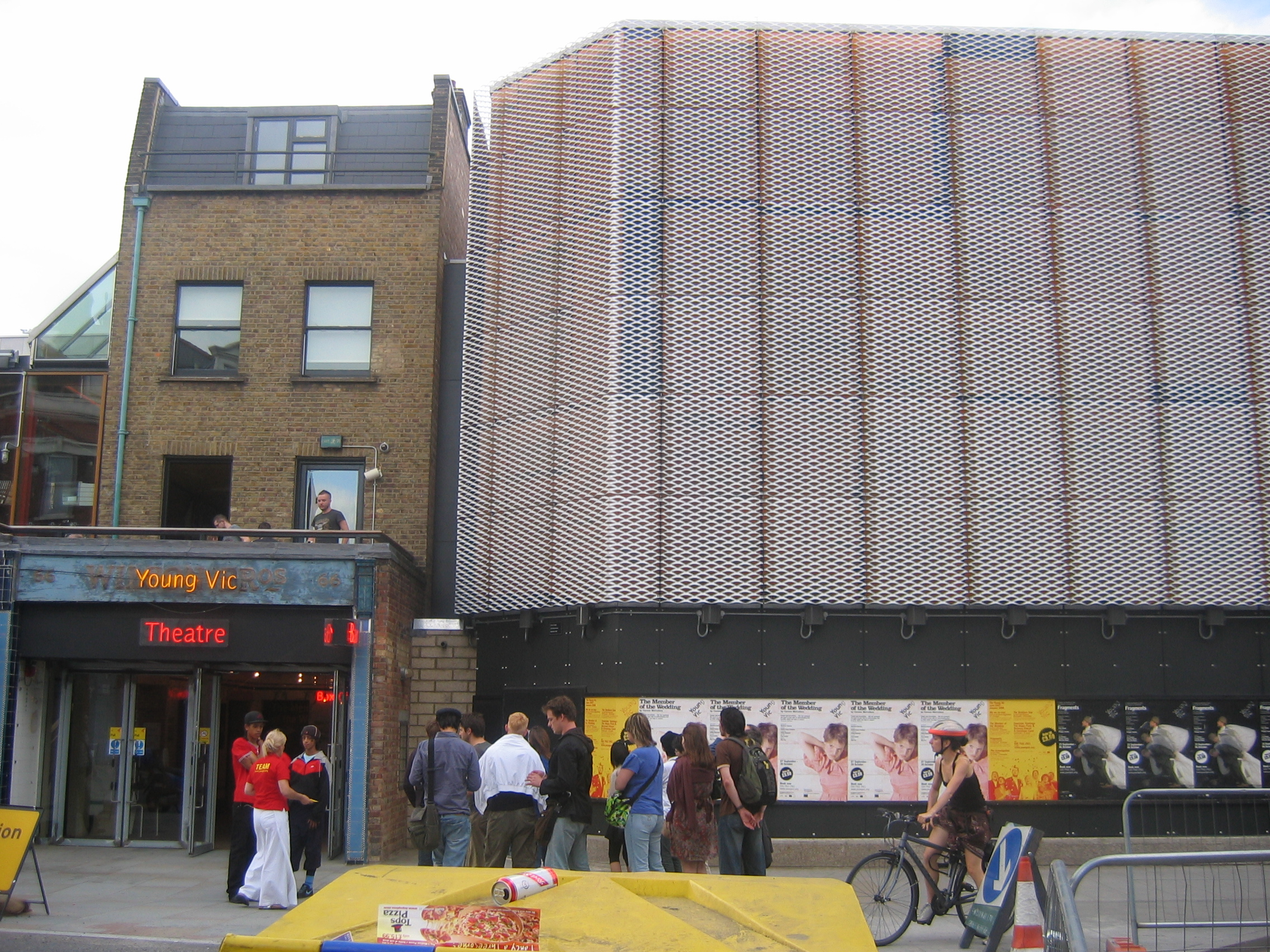
The Young Vic

Guildhall of St George, King's Lynn, Norfolk
Appointed 2023 to lead on redevelopment of England's oldest theatre. Work due to complete 2026.
Kingston School of Art, London.
Refurbished creative space for Kingston University. Completed 2019.

Lambeth Archives completed February 2024

Battersea Arts Centre, London.
12 year collaboration with the theatre to reimagine and transform their spaces, including the Great Hall. Completed 2018.
Everyman Theatre, Liverpool
Complete rebuilding of the Everyman Theatre. Completed 2014.
The Shed, London
Temporary auditorium for the National Theatre on the South Bank. 2013–2014 only.
North Wall, Oxford
New theatre for St Edward's School. Completed 2006.
Young Vic Theatre, London
Refurbishment of Bill Howell's 1970s auditorium with new studios, foyer and back-of-house facilities for the Young Vic theatre. Completed 2006.
The Egg, Bath
Children's Theatre for the Theatre Royal, in an existing Grade II listed building in the heart of Bath, Somerset. Completed 2005.
Student Housing, Newington Green, London
Accommodation for students in land-locked site in Newington Green, London. Transformation of the old headquarters building of the China Inland Mission. Completed 2004.
Extension to Hayward Gallery, London
Extension and refurbishment of the Hayward Gallery including new pavilion structure with artist Dan Graham. Completed 2004.
Herbert Art Gallery and Museum, Coventry
Extension and refurbishment for Coventry City Council adjacent to Coventry Cathedral. Completed 2004.
Loch Promenade, Douglas, Isle of Man
High-quality offices in the centre of Douglas with new landscaped square. Most recent phase completed 2002.
Iroko Housing, London
New terraced housing development with central courtyard for Coin Street Community Builders on London's South Bank. Completed 2001.
Royal Court Theatre, London
Rebuilding of existing Royal Court Theatre in Sloane Square with new front of house facilities, offices, dressing rooms and technical facilities. Completed 2000.
