= European theatre =

European theatre (or theater) may refer to:

== Military theatres ==
- European theater of the Seven Years' War
- European theatre of World War I
- European theatre of World War II
  - European Theater of Operations, United States Army

== Other uses ==
- European Theatre Convention
- Theatre § Early modern and modern theatre in the West
