= European Theatre Convention =

European theatre association

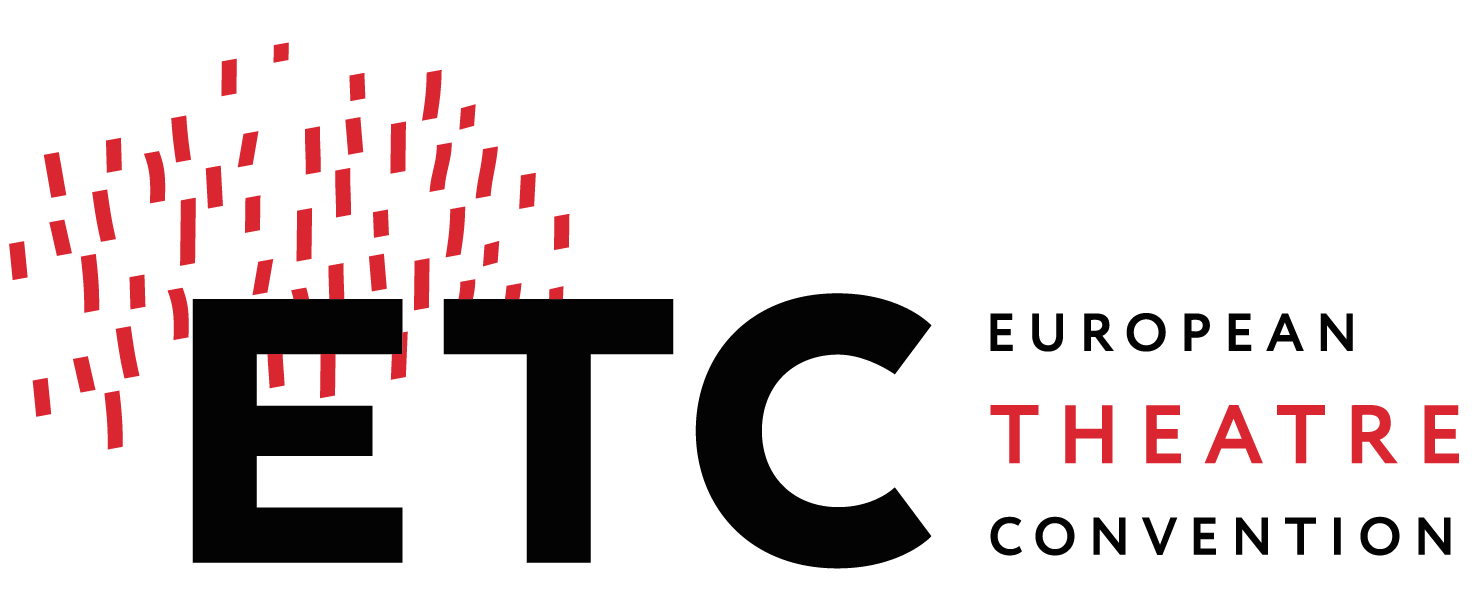
- Formation: 1988
- Location: Berlin, Germany
- Leader: Heidi Wiley
- Website: Official website

The European Theatre Convention (ETC) is a European theatre association founded in 1988.

The ETC is funded partly by the Creative Europe programme of its strategic partner, the European Commission. It is based in Berlin. As a "network of public theatres in Europe", it has 63 members in 31 European countries (As of November 2023). The ETC organizes projects which promote European theatre as a "platform for dialogue, democracy and interaction", and offers the possibility of international networking for theatre professionals. The executive director is Heidi Wiley.

== History ==
Daniel Benoin, Jean-Claude Drouot and Heribert Sasse founded the ETC in 1988. The statutes were laid down in November 1987. Initially three theatres in France, Belgium and Germany collaborated.

It aims at promoting contemporary theatrical creation, supporting the mobility of emerging artists, and the exchange of activities, ideas and artistic concepts in Europe.

== Projects ==
The ETC has organised annual conferences on a variety of topics for theatre professionals, and has provided financial and organizational support for international artistic exchange. It has hosted a range of programmes.

"ENGAGE – Empowering today's audience through challenging theatre" was a four-year programme from 2017 to 2021, focused on the topics of participatory theatre, youth theatre and theatre in the digital age.

"Theatre is Dialogue – Dialogue of Cultures" is a program that has supported theatre makers in Ukraine and other Eastern European countries since 2014. The focus is on the exchange of the theatre makers, such as artist residencies, guest performances and getting to know each other in the theatre scene.

Young Europe is a project of artistic cooperation, in which ETC member theatres have staged new theatre texts on the subjects of identity and integration, aiming at a young international audience. In 2015, Young Europe was recognized as a "European Success Story" by the EU.

Nadia is an international theatre project, funded by the German Federal Cultural Foundation, that investigates reasons for the radicalization of young people in Europe, using artistic means, in exchange with young people.

European Theatre Lab: Drama goes Digital was a project, between 2016 and 2018, to researched the future of theatre in the digital age. It won the Pearle award "Spotlight on Heritage in Culture and the Arts".

The Art of Ageing was a project highlighting in four productions the challenges of a demographically changing society.

Renaissance was a 2021 programme which produced an original series of 22 short drama films.

Trans-Formations is a project to energize and revive European theatres and audiences in a post-COVID world. The activities include conferences, artistic programmes and workshops from 2021 to 2024.

In 2023, the European Theatre Convention curated the second edition of the European Theatre Forum organised by the European Commission, which led to the publication of the policy document, the Opole Recommendations.

== Member theatres ==
As of 2023:

- Albania: National Theatre of Albania (Tirana)
- Austria: Landestheater Linz, Schauspielhaus Graz, Volkstheater Wien (Vienna), Schauspielhaus Salzburg, Tiroler Landestheater und Orchester Innsbruck
- Belgium: Théâtre de Liège
- Bulgaria: Theatre and Music Center Kardjali (Kardjali), Ivan Vazov National Theatre (Sofia)
- Croatia: Croatian National Theater (Zagreb)
- Cyprus: Theatrical Organization of Cyprus (Cyprus)
- Czech Republic: Národní divadlo/National Theatre (Prague)
- France: Théâtre National de Bretagne (Rennes)
- Georgia: Tbilisi International Festival of Theatre
- Germany: Deutsches Theater (Berlin), Staatstheater Braunschweig, Staatsschauspiel Dresden, Theater Dortmund, Theater & Orchester Heidelberg, Badisches Staatstheater Karlsruhe, Theater Magdeburg
- Greece: National Theatre of Greece (Athens)
- Hungary: Pesti Magyar Színház (Budapest)
- Italy: Teatro Stabile di Torino (Turin), Fondazione Teatro Due (Parma), PAV (Rome)
- Kosovo: National Theatre of Kosovo (Pristina)
- Latvia: Dailes Teatris (Riga)
- Lithuania: State Small Theatre of Vilnius
- Luxembourg: Théâtre d'Esch (Esch-sur-Alzette), Les Théâtres de la Ville de Luxembourg (Luxembourg City)
- Malta: Teatru Malta (Valletta)
- Montenegro: Montenegrin National Theatre (Podgorica), Royal Theatre "Zetski dom" (Cetinje)
- Netherlands: De Toneelmakerij (Amsterdam), Het Zuidelijk Toneel (Tilburg)
- Norway: Det Norske Teatret (Oslo)
- Poland: JK Opole Theatre
- Portugal: Teatro Nacional D. Maria II (Lisbon), Teatro Municipal Sá de Miranda (Viana do Castelo), Centro Cultural de Belém (Lisbon), São Luiz Teatro Municipal (Lisbon)
- Romania: Teatrul National Marin Sorescu (Craiova), Teatrul National Timisoara, Teatrul Național "Lucian Blaga" Cluj-Napoca
- Serbia: National Theatre in Belgrade
- Slovakia: Slovak National Theatre (Bratislava), Divadlo Jána Palárika v Trnave
- Slovenia: Slovensko narodno gledališče Nova Gorica, Prešernovo gledališče Kranj
- Spain: Teatro Arriaga (Bilbao)
- Sweden: Gothenburg City Theatre – Backa Teater (Gothenburg), Folkteatern Göteborg, Malmö City Theatre
- Ukraine: Kyiv National Academic Molodyy Theatre (Kyiv), Dakh Contemporary Arts Center (Kyiv), Left Bank Theatre (Kyiv), Lesia Ukrainka Academic Professional Theatre (Lviv)
- United Kingdom: Belarus Free Theatre (London), Young Vic (London), Royal Lyceum Theatre (Edinburgh)
