= Kyiv National Academic Molodyy Theatre =

Youth theatre in Kyiv, Ukraine

- Київський національний академічний Молодий театр
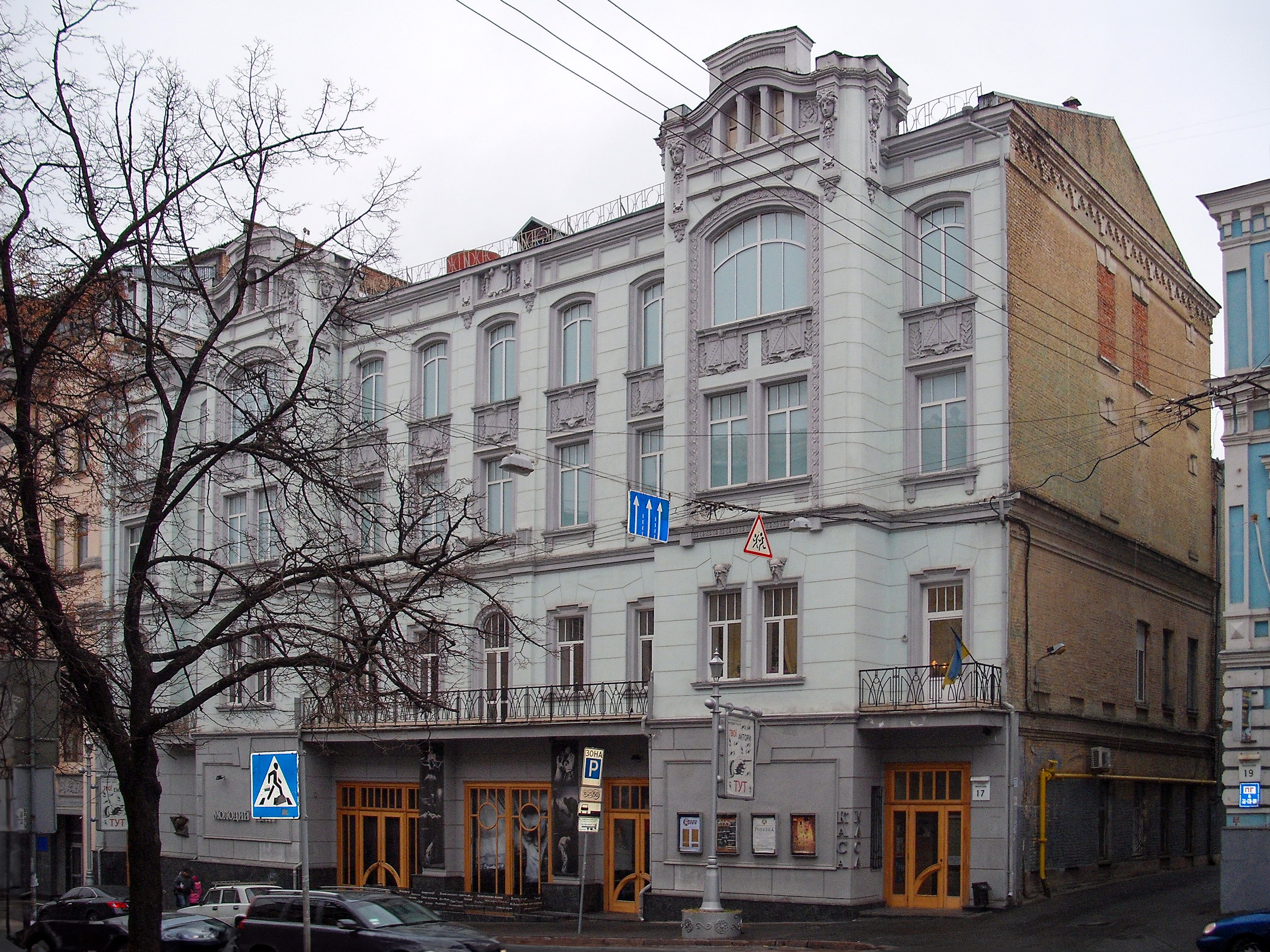
- Interactive map of Kyiv National Academic Molodyy Theatre
- Address: Prorizna Street 17; Kyiv; Ukraine
- Coordinates: 50°26′54″N 30°31′01″E

Construction
- Opened: 14 December 1979

Website
- molodyytheatre.com

Immovable Monument of Local Significance of Ukraine
- Official name: Будинок прибутковий М. Григоровича Барського, в якому у 1918-1919 рр. містився «Молодий Театр» Л.Курбаса (Profitable house of M. Hryhorovych Barskyi, the site of the Molodyi Theatre of L. Kurbas in 1918–1919)
- Type: Architecture, History, Monumental Art
- Reference no.: 3104-Кв

The Kyiv National Academic Molodyy Theatre (Ukrainian: Київський національний академічний Молодий театр) is a theatre in Kyiv, Ukraine. It was founded in 1979 and first played on 26 April 1980, with a focus on progressive productions. It is also known simply as Molodyy Theatre (Young Theatre). It is a member of the European Theatre Convention, and became a national institution in 2019.

== History ==
A first Molodyi Theatr (Young Theatre) was founded in Kyiv in 1917 by Les Kurbas, an innovative Ukrainian director, actor and playwright. He wanted to connect new Ukrainian theatre to international theatre. It was closed by the government after two years.

The present theatre was founded on 14 December 1979, when the first meeting of the theater troupe took place. It was then named Molodijniy Theatre. The first stage director was Alexander Zabolotnyi. The first performance was held on 26 April 1980, playing ... I will come back to you with spring!. The first performances showed the troupe's characteristics: unusual artistic style of theatrical performance, openness to problems, and a "fresh look on life and art". The theatre staged the first performances in Ukraine of Boris Zakhoder's Alice's Adventures in Wonderland after Lewis Carroll, the comedy Cylinder by E. de Philippo, and Y. Scherbak's Little Soccer Team. A signature production is After Two Hares, presented more than 800 times in 30 years. Stage directors at the theatre included Nikolay Merzlikin, Les Tanyuk, Vladimir Ogloblin, Viktor Shulakov, Valentin Kozmenko-Delinde, Valeriy Bilchenko, Mark Nestantiner, Dmitriy Bogomazov, Vitaliy Malahov and Dmitriy Lazorko.

The theatre was renamed Molodyy Theatre in 1995, in memory of the first theatre by Les Kurbas in the same building, and with the intention to live up to his ideas. The following year, Stanislav Moiseev became stage director. With a renewed repertoire, the theatre began to tour internationally. Moiseev collaborated with composer Yuriy Shevchenko, costume designer Elena Bogatireva, playwright Yanush Glovatskiy, and scene-designers Sergei Masloboyschikov and Andrey Aleksandrovich-Dochevskiy. A new production, Alexei Vertinskiy's Blue automobile, was awarded several European theatrical prizes. The theatre staged adaptions of works by Ukrainian Yuriy Andruhovich, including Perversion and Moskoviada.

In 2012, Andrii Bilous became artistic director. He introduced more productions per season, also on tours and at festivals, and continued the pursuit of a connection to the international scene.

The theatre began its own studio, the MolodyyStudio, in 2018. Typically three performances per season are staged by studio graduates. The theatre became a national institution in 2019. It is a member of the European Theatre Convention, with a focus on international projects and contacts, integrating "Ukrainian theatre into the European cultural space".

== Stages and program ==
From 1985 to the present day, the theatre is based at a mansion on Prorizna Street, which formerly served as an apartment building, an officers' club, the Young Theater of Les Kurbas, and the cinema "Komsomolets of Ukraine". The theatre has three stages, a large hall seating 374, a chamber hall for 80 people, and a small hall (micro) seating 50. The usual number of new productions per year is 10–12.

The broad repertoire includes works by international playwrights such as Chekhov, Ibsen, Shakespeare, Vasily Sigarev and Eduard Volodarsky. The focus is the creation of advanced, progressive projects, including unusual performance spaces and open-air, addressing people "young in mind".
