= The Egg, Bath =

English theatre hall

Coordinates: 51°22′54″N 2°21′49″W

The Egg
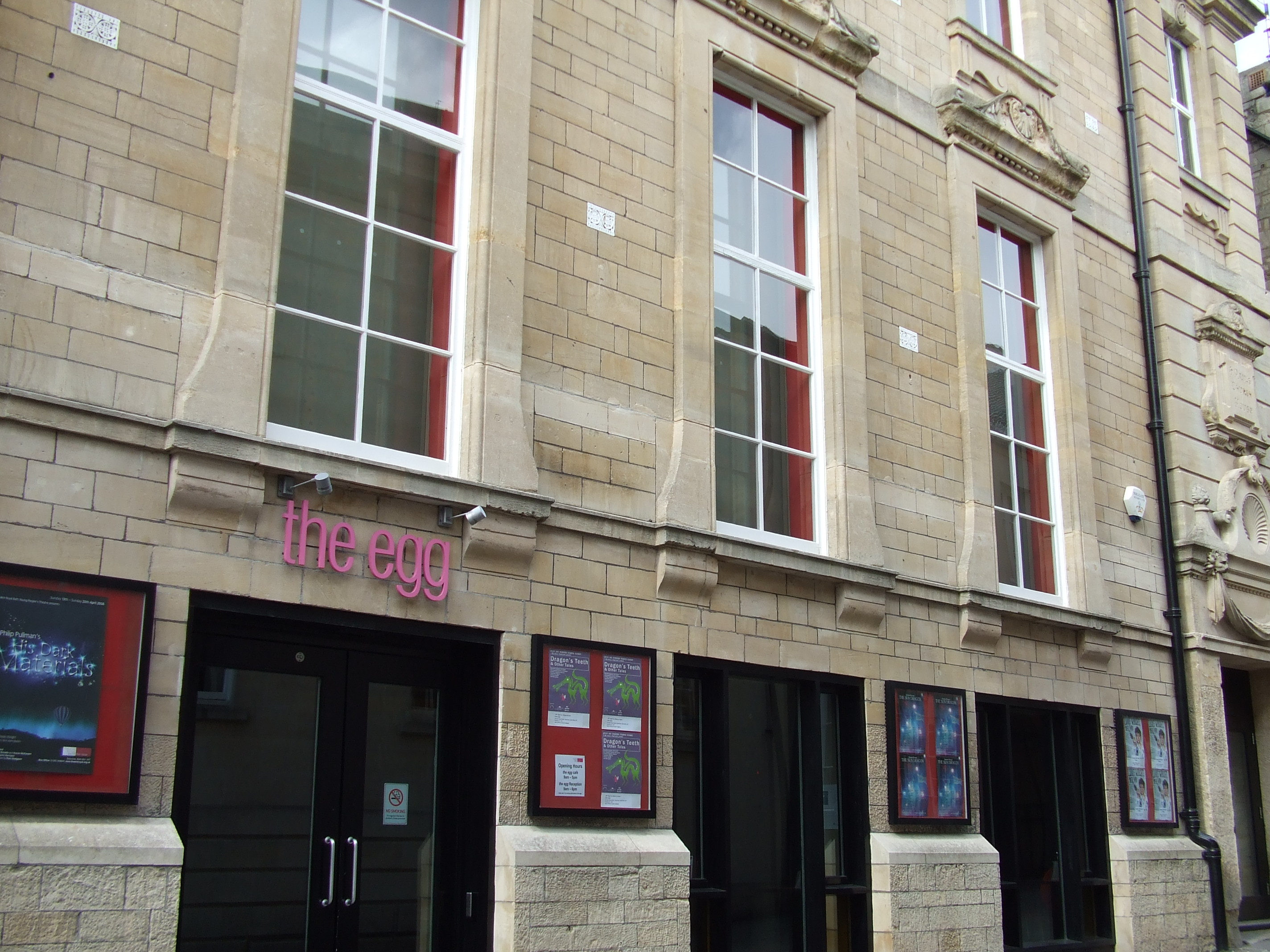
- Interactive map of The Egg
- Address: Bath; England
- Designation: Listed Building Grade II

Construction
- Opened: 2005
- Architect: Haworth Tompkins

Website
- www.theatreroyal.org.uk/the-egg

The Egg (styled as the egg) is a theatre in Bath, built specifically for the use of young people. It was converted from a former cinema and church hall by architects Haworth Tompkins. The Grade II listed Victorian building houses the eponymous 'egg'-shaped auditorium, around which an arts cafe, rooftop rehearsal space and basement technical workshop are arranged. The idea was supported by the children's author Bel Mooney. It opened in October 2005. In 2007, the Peter Hall Company made use of the space in order to stage a production of George Orwell's Animal Farm.

The auditorium is flexible in enabling both fully day-lit or blacked out theatre and is usable end-on, in the round, flat floor and traverse.

== See also ==
- Theatre Royal, Bath
- Ustinov Studio
