= Young Vic =

Theatre in Waterloo, London

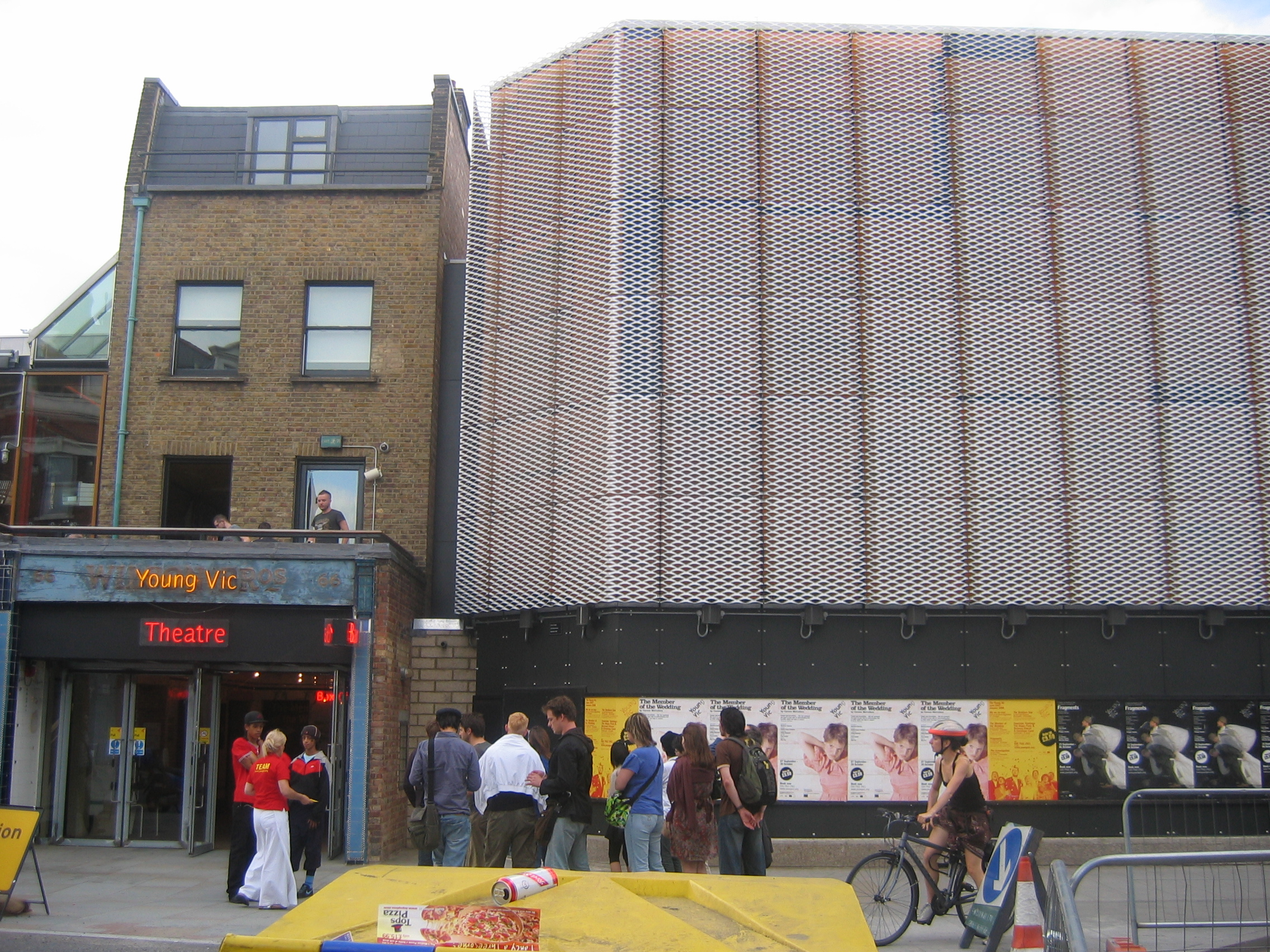
- Interactive map of Young Vic
- Address: The Cut; London, SE1; England, U.K.
- Coordinates: 51.50323°N 0.10748°W
- Owner: The Young Vic Company
- Capacity: 420 Main house 150 Maria (studio); 70 Clare (studio)
- Type: Non-commercial resident company
- Production: Repertory seasons
- Public transit: Waterloo; Southwark; Waterloo; Waterloo East

Construction
- Opened: 1970 (56 years ago)
- Rebuilt: 2006 (20 years ago): Haworth Tompkins
- Architect: Haworth Tompkins

Website
- youngvic.org

The Young Vic Theatre is a performing-arts venue located on The Cut, near the South Bank, in the London Borough of Lambeth, United Kingdom.

The Young Vic was established by Frank Dunlop in 1970. Nadia Fall has been artistic director since 2025, succeeding Kwame Kwei-Armah, and David Lan before him.

== History ==
In the period after World War II, a Young Vic Company was formed in 1946 by director George Devine as an offshoot of the Old Vic Theatre School for the purpose of performing classic plays for audiences aged nine to fifteen.

This was discontinued in 1948, when Devine and the entire faculty resigned from the Old Vic, but in 1969 Dunlop became founder-director of The Young Vic theatre with Scapino, his free adaptation of Molière's The Cheats of Scapin, presented at the new venue as a National Theatre production. It opened on 10 September 1970 and starred Jim Dale in the title role, with designs by Carl Toms (decor) and Maria Björnson (costumes).

Initially part of the National Theatre, the Young Vic Theatre became an independent body in 1974.

In the words of Laurence Olivier, then-director of the National Theatre: "Here we think to develop plays for young audiences, an experimental workshop for authors, actors and producers." The aim was to create an accessible theatre which offered high quality at low cost in an informal environment. The aim was to appeal to young audiences, but this time not specifically to children.

== Young Vic Theatre ==
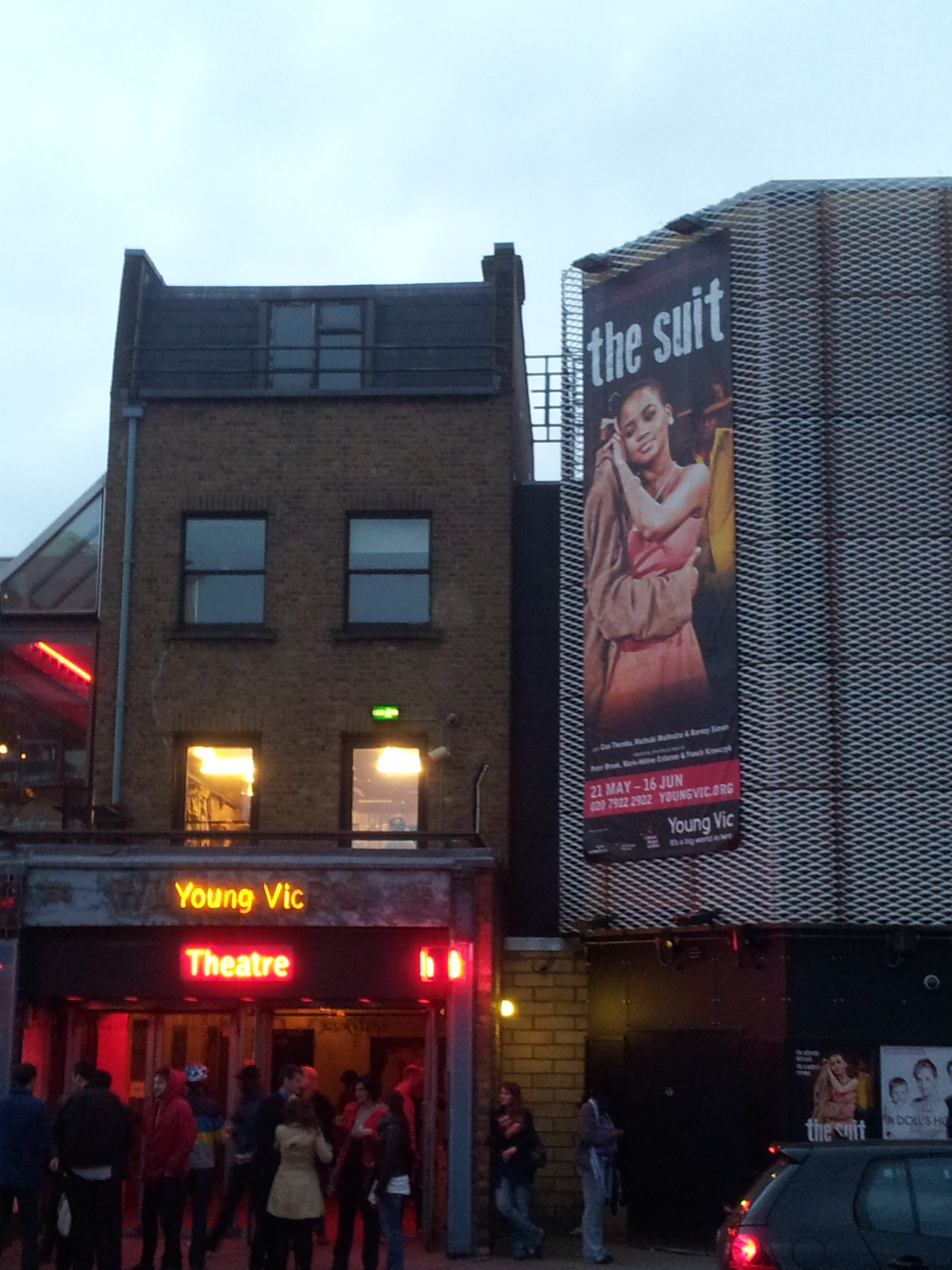
Young Vic Theatre, Southwark

Dunlop completed creation of the theatre venue in 1970, a breeze-block building constructed out of a former butcher's shop and an adjacent bomb-site with a red wooden slat auditorium bench seating. The structure was intended to last for five years, but has become permanent.

The auditorium, with a thrust stage, has an approximate capacity of 420, although the configuration and capacity can vary depending on the design of each production.

The theatre undertook a significant rebuilding and renewal project in the 2000s, designed by architects Haworth Tompkins, boosting its visibility on The Cut. In addition to the Young Vic's main house, there are now two smaller theatre spaces. The Maria, named after theatre designer Maria Björnson, is the larger of the two with a capacity of 150. The Clare, named after Clare Venables, a former artistic director of the Young Vic and Sheffield Crucible, seats 70. Like the main house, both smaller theatres have flexible seating configurations which can be arranged to suit the production design. In the two smaller auditoria, seating is usually unreserved, with the actors performing in close proximity to the audience.

The Young Vic performs both new writing and classic plays, the latter often in innovative productions. Despite its small size, like the Almeida Theatre, the Young Vic has attracted well-known actors since its creation. These have included Ian Charleson, who made his professional debut with the Young Vic 1972–74, and who played Jimmy Porter in Look Back in Anger and Hamlet in the first revival of Tom Stoppard's Rosencrantz and Guildenstern Are Dead in 1973, as well as Vanessa Redgrave, Helen Mirren, Judi Dench, Timothy Dalton, Robert Lindsay, Willard White, John Malkovich, Michael Sheen and Arthur Lowe.

The rock band The Who held free, weekly concerts at the Young Vic in early 1971, in order to rehearse what would become their album, Who's Next. One of these shows was released on the Deluxe edition of this album.

A memorial at the theatre's south-east corner commemorates the fifty-four people killed in 1941 while sheltering in the cellars of the former building during the Blitz of World War II.

In 1982, the theatre hosted a Poetry Olympics, where comedian Pat Condell took part.

Virginia Woolf taught at Morley College from 1905, a precursor of the Young Vic's education and community engagement programme. The latter now runs an office which accommodates and houses the "homeless" Belarus Free Theatre, of Nikolai Khalezin, Natalia Kaliada, with Sarah Kane's play 4.48 Psychosis performed underground, illegally in Minsk and Farringdon, in the cold cells of Clerkenwell House of Detention, a secret location in London.

Echoing the words of Woolf and mirroring her suicide, Kane's play was sponsored by another feminist, Sue Emmas, who since the year 1993 has been associate director of the social engagement programme, working closely with Kwame Kwei-Armah and leads the Directors Program which provides initiatives for emerging directors, with emphasis on seeking out and nurturing artists from under-represented backgrounds.

== Artistic directors ==
- Frank Dunlop (1968–1971, also administrative director)
- Michael Bogdanov (1971–1973)
- David Thacker
- Julia Bardsley and Tim Supple (jointly) (1991–1994)
- Tim Supple (1994–2000)
- David Lan (2000–2018)
- Kwame Kwei-Armah (2018–2024)
- Nadia Fall (since 2025)

== Awards ==
- 2004 – Laurence Olivier Award for Outstanding Achievement in an Affiliate Theatre
- 2008 – Laurence Olivier Award for Best Musical Revival – The Magic Flute
- 2013 – Critics' Circle Theatre Award for Best Musical – The Scottsboro Boys
- 2016 – Laurence Olivier Award for Best Revival – Yerma
- 2017 – Critics' Circle Theatre Special Award for Commendation for artistic direction at the Young Vic – David Lan
- 2018 – Critics' Circle Theatre Award for Best New Play – The Inheritance
- 2018 – Evening Standard Theatre Award for Best Play – The Inheritance
- 2019 – Screen Nation Film and TV Diversity in Drama Award – Soon Gone: A Windrush Chronicle
- 2019 – Laurence Olivier Award for Best New Play – The Inheritance

== Refurbishment 2004–2006 ==
In 2003, the Young Vic launched a campaign to raise £12.5 million for a major reconstruction of its building and closed in 2004 for work to start.

Designed by architects Haworth Tompkins – also known for their refurbishment of the Royal Court Theatre, Regent's Park Open Air Theatre, and two temporary venues for the Almeida – and with Jane Wernick Associates as the structural engineers, and consulting engineers Max Fordham LLP designing the building services, the refurbishment was completed in October 2006.

The main auditorium has been left intact, but refurbished and technically enhanced. The butcher's shop has also been retained as the main entrance to the building and also the box office.

The remainder of the 1970s structure has been rebuilt to provide new foyers, dressing rooms, two studio theatres, and workshop spaces. An award of £5 million was received from the Arts Council of England.

The Young Vic re-opened on 11 October 2006, with a production of the community opera Tobias and the Angel; with music by Jonathan Dove and a libretto by David Lan.

On 16 May 2007, the refurbished Young Vic won the RIBA London Building of the Year Award, presented by the Royal Institute of British Architects. Following this award, the Young Vic was also shortlisted for the RIBA Stirling Prize on 27 July 2007.

A rebranding exercise by Sense Worldwide in 2010 resulted in the abandonment of the theatre's thirty-year-old "sit anywhere" policy and a new strapline, "It's a big world in here".

== Digital Theatre ==
The Young Vic was one of the launch theatres for Digital Theatre, a project that makes theatre productions available in video download form. The first performances that were filmed were Kafka's Monkey and The Container.

== See also ==
- List of London venues
- Theatre of the United Kingdom
- English drama
