= Mikalai Khalezin =

Belarusian playwright

Mikalai Khalezin MBE
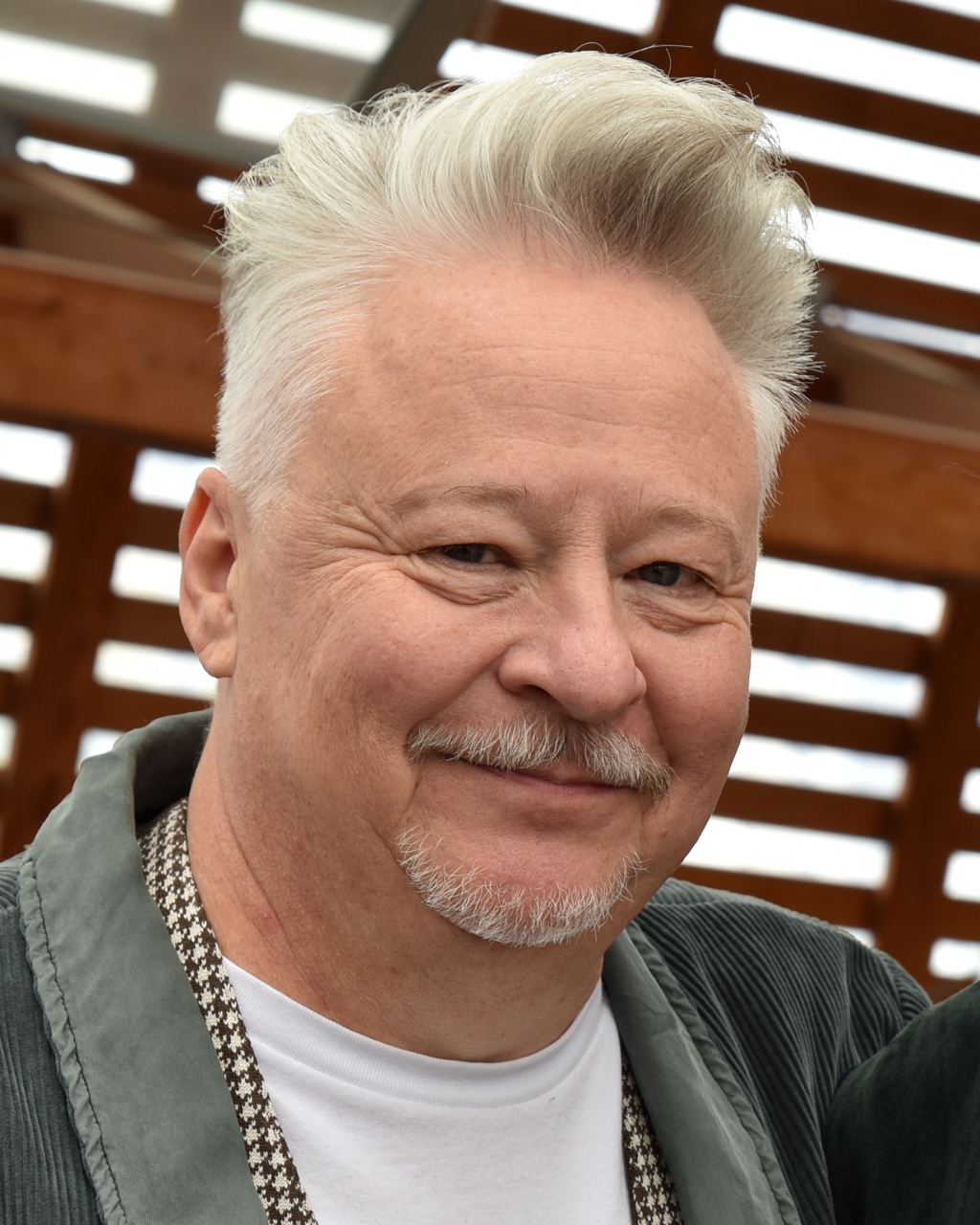
- Mikalaj Chalezin (2025)
- Born: Mikalai Mikalayevič Khalezin; March 30, 1964 (age 62); Minsk, Belarusian SSR, USSR
- Occupations: playwright, dissident, journalist
- Spouse: Natalia Koliada

Mikalai Mikalayevič Khalezin (Belarusian: Мікалай Мікалаевіч Халезін; Russian: Николай Николаевич Халезин, romanized: Nikolay Nikolayevich Khalezin; born 30 March 1964, Minsk, Belarusian SSR, USSR) is a Belarusian-British playwright and journalist, co-founder and art-director of the underground Belarus Free Theatre, dissident and a longtime critic of Belarusian president Alexander Lukashenko.

== Biography ==
Khalezin was born in Minsk in 1964. His father was a singer in the Belarusian State Philharmonic. In 1984, he entered Institute for National Economy in Minsk but quit after 2.5 or 3 years. In 1987–1991, he worked as a scenographer in the Alternative theatre in Minsk. In 1990, he created "Vita Nova" gallery of contemporary art. In 1994–2000, he worked in 3 non-government newspapers which were later forcibly closed for political reasons. For his activities he was detained 4 times and imprisoned once.

In 2005, Khalezin and his wife Natalia Koliada founded deliberately underground Belarus Free Theatre, and soon a stage director Uladzimir Shcherban joined them. In 2007, the whole troupe with the audience were arrested by Belarusian police during the play. According to Khalezin, former head of the presidential administration Vladimir Makei tried to discredit his theatre for Khalezin's anti-Lukashenko activities. In 2011, the United Kingdom granted political asylum to Khalezin and his wife.

In 2020, Khalezin became an active lobbyist of sanctions against the Belarusian regime. As of December 2020, Khalezin was an executive director of the Creative Politics Hub and lobbied the imposition of sanctions against supporters and close associates of Lukashenko. On 27 December 2020, Belarusian government newspaper Sovetskaya Belorussiya published an uncovered death threat to Khalezin and his wife ("We will definitely find you... and we will hang you, side-by-side"). A British foreign office spokeswoman condemned that threat. Khalezin and Kaliada expressed fears about possible assassination attempts but refused to stop their anti-Lukashenko activity. In 2021, Khalezin continued to collaborate with the Belarusian leader-in-exile Sviatlana Tsikhanouskaya participating in her visit to the United States of America in July 2021.

As of 2013, he had 12 plays and over 200 publications in Belarus and abroad. As of 2021, he is a strategic development manager in the Belarusian Council for Culture (BY_CULTURE). He currently lives in London.

Khalezin and Kaliada were both appointed Member of the Order of the British Empire (MBE) in the 2023 Birthday Honours for services to theatre.
