= Natalia Kaliada =

Belarusian theatre producer

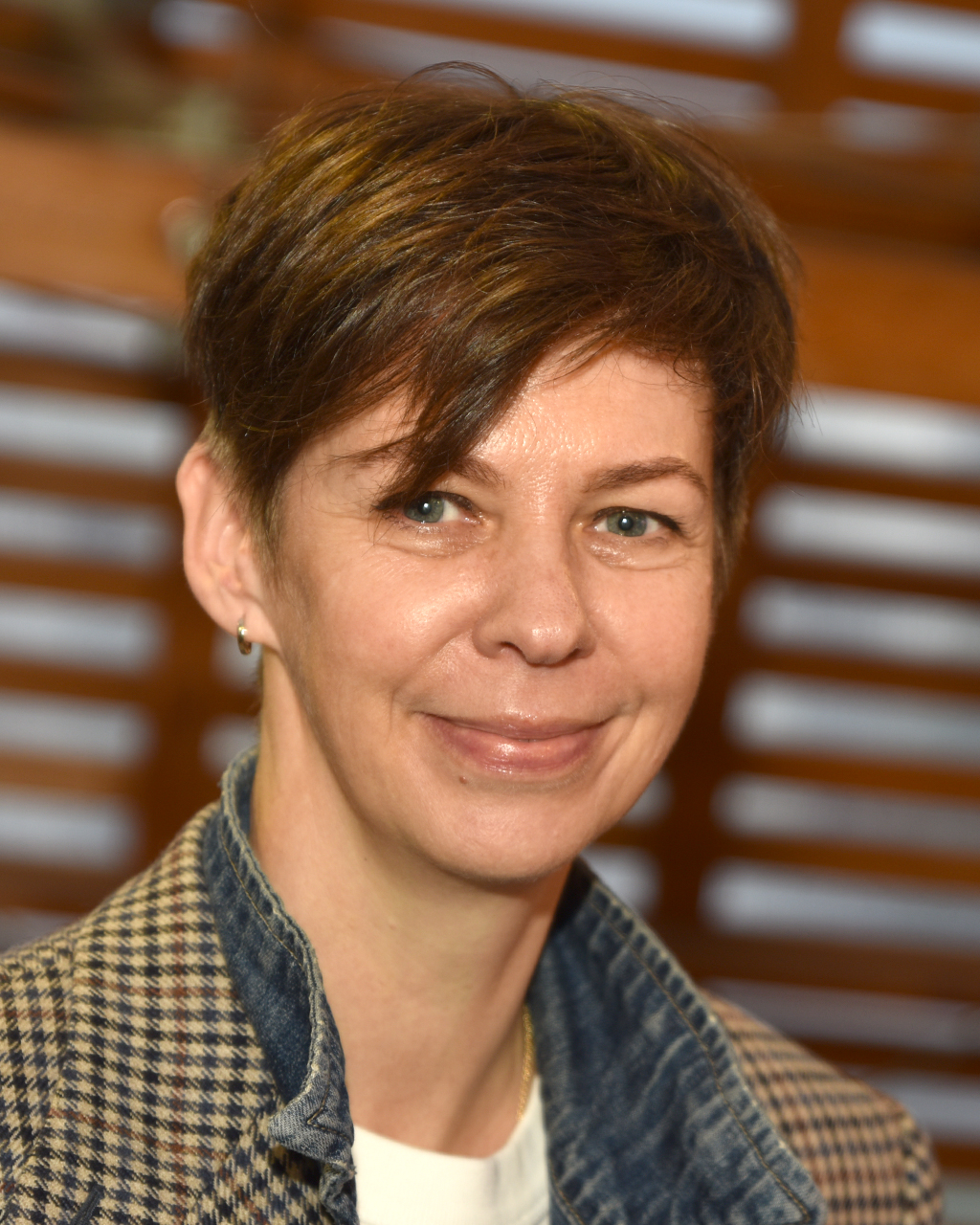
Natália Kaljada (2025)

Natalia Koliada is a Belarusian theatre producer. She is the cofounder of the Belarus Free Theatre with her husband Nikolai Khalezin.
