= Théâtre d'Esch =

Coordinates: 49°29′33.86″N 5°58′38.89″E

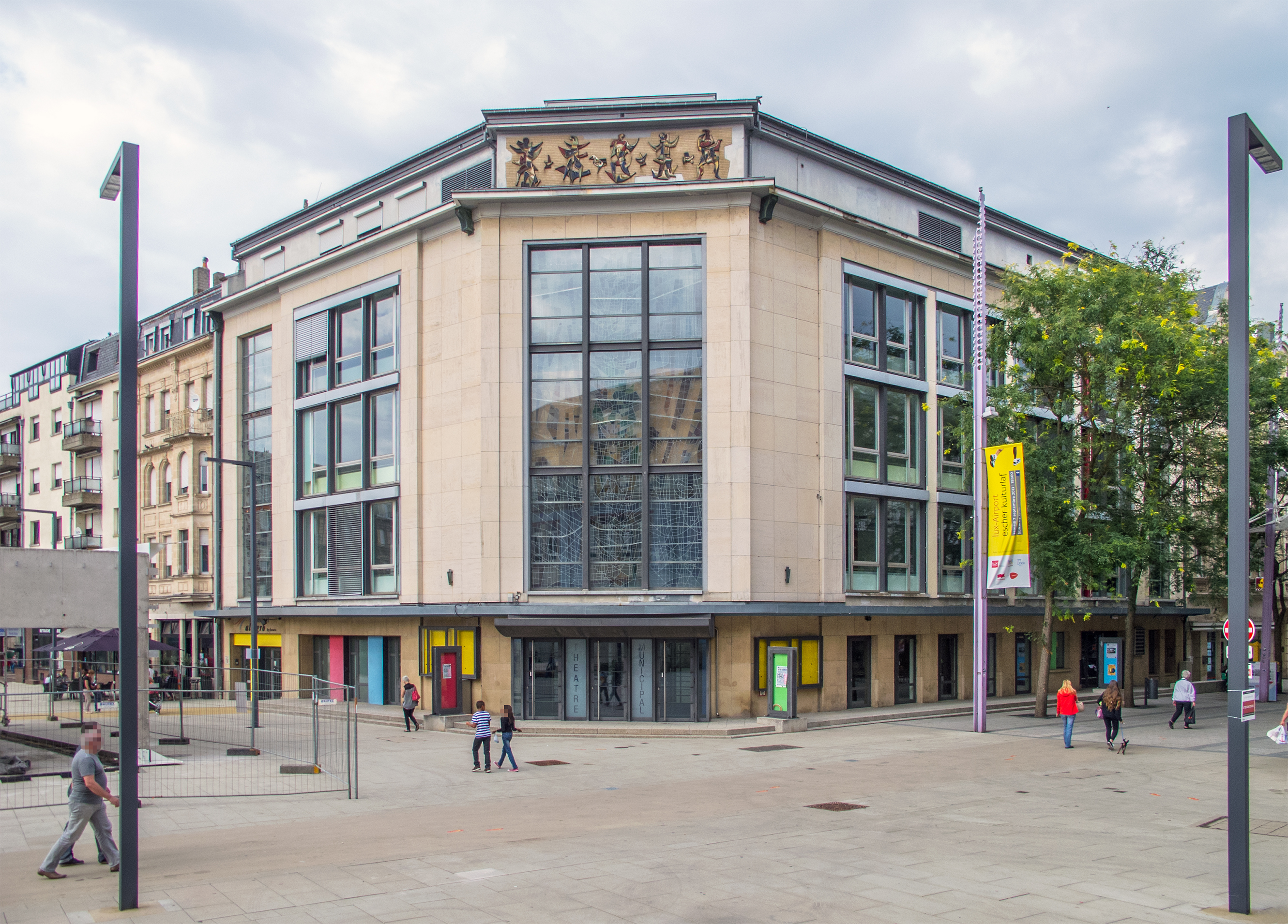
An Image of Théâtre d'Esch

Théâtre d’Esch is a theatre in Esch-sur-Alzette, Luxembourg. Directed by Carole Lorang, the main auditorium has 517 numbered seats. The theatre puts on performances of operas, operettas, concerts, dance performances, variety, jazz, songs, musicals and other entertainment.

The smaller hall, with 100 seats is commonly used for intimate jazz performances and poetry recitals and conferences. The building is also used for the presentation of art exhibitions.
