= Coin Street Community Builders =

Trust and social enterprise in London

- Company type: Trust
- Industry: Housebuilding
- Founded: 1984
- Headquarters: London, England, United Kingdom
- Key people: Dr Scott Rice, (Chairman); Iain Tuckett, (Executive Director)
- Website: www.coinstreet.org

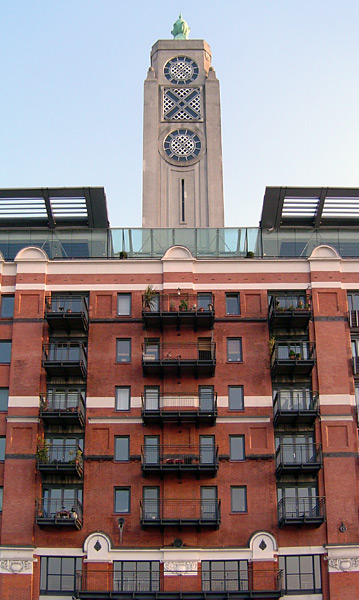
Oxo Tower Wharf

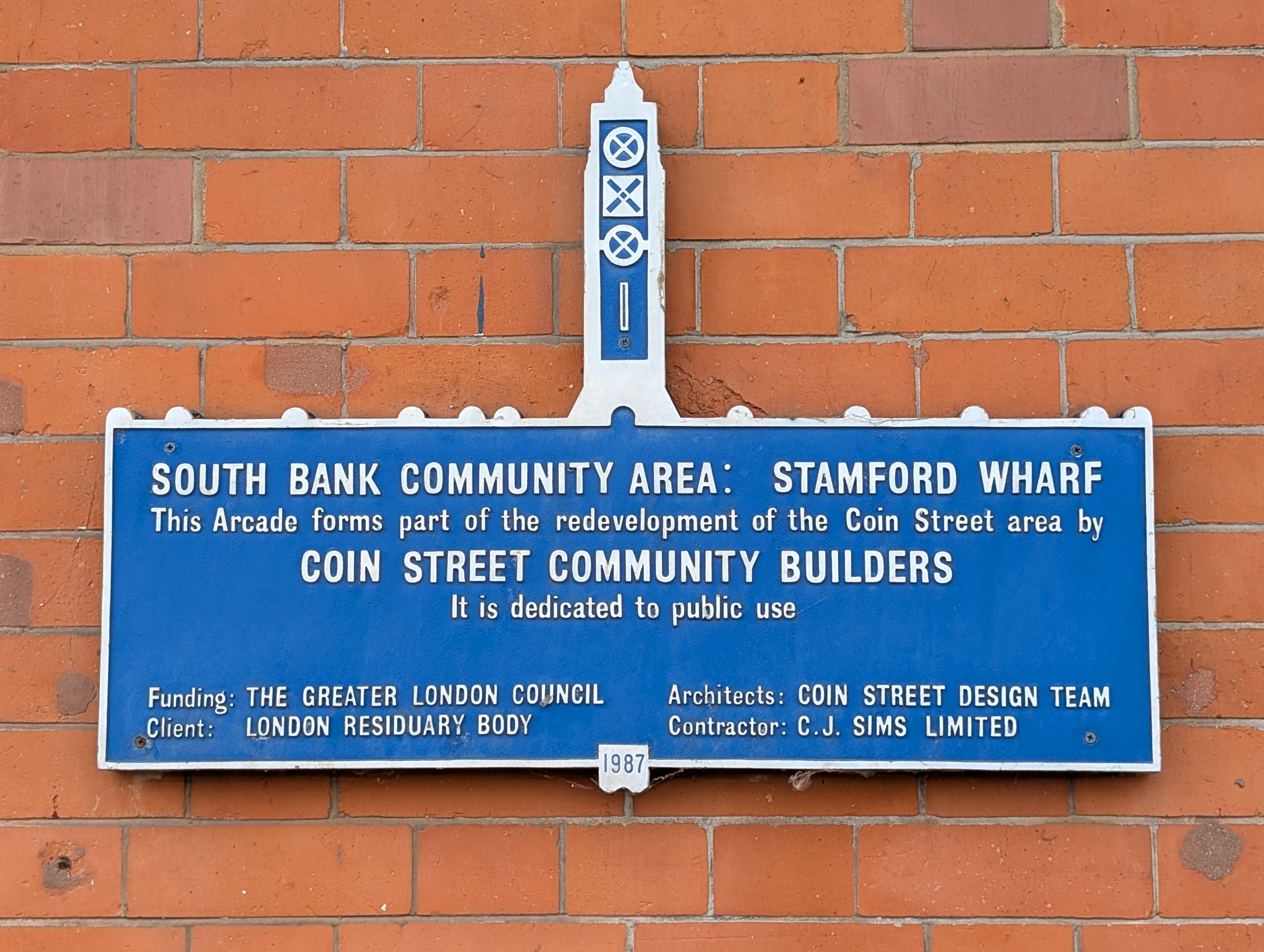
Coin Street Community Builders plaque on OXO Tower Wharf

Coin Street Community Builders (CSCB) is a development trust and social enterprise which seeks to make London's South Bank a better place in which to live, to work, to visit and to study. Since 1984 CSCB has transformed a largely derelict 13-acre site into a thriving mixed-use neighbourhood.

== History ==
Since its creation in 1984, CSCB redeveloped the Oxo Tower Wharf, Gabriel's Wharf, Bernie Spain Gardens and set up four housing co-operatives (Mulberry, Palm, Redwood and Iroko). The housing co-operatives are housed in new buildings commissioned by CSCB. Palm (also known as Broadwall) was designed by Lifschutz Davidson (now Lifschutz Davidson Sandilands) completed in 1994. Iroko was designed by architects Haworth Tompkins and was completed in 2001.

In 2007, CSCB occupied new offices at the Coin Street neighbourhood centre, also designed by Haworth Tompkins. As well as offices the building includes a day nursery and crèche, conference and meeting facilities.

CSCB also offers a variety of community programmes for people of all ages including youth clubs, sports and dance sessions and family and children's activities.

CSCB opposed the Garden Bridge project which would have been partially built on their land.

== Management ==
The Group Chairman is Dr Scott Rice. The Group Director is Iain Tuckett.
