= Sponsume =

- Website type: Crowdfunding
- Available in: English
- Website: http://www.sponsume.com
- Commercial: Yes
- Launched: August 2010

Sponsume was an online multicurrency crowdfunding platform founded by French entrepreneur Gregory Vincent in 2010. However, it ceased its crowdfunding services in 2014.

== History ==
During his time as a doctoral student at Oxford University, Vincent developed a strong interest in the works of Muhammad Yunus, a pioneering figure in the world of microfinance. Vincent recognised the potential of peer-to-peer microfinance as an alternative method for funding innovative ideas. In 2009, the financial crisis and subsequent cuts to subsidies in the UK arts scene highlighted the need for a community-led approach to fundraising for artists and innovators. This prompted Vincent to establish Sponsume.

== Model ==
The site used the power of social networks and the wisdom of crowds to help fund a variety of projects ranging from films and documentaries, to music, theatre, photography, fashion, technology, scientific research, green and social enterprise. By 2012, Sponsume had helped crowd fund over 1000 campaigns.

Project owners set a funding goal and a deadline for their campaigns. In return for contributions, they offered non-monetary rewards typically related to their projects. The platform charged a 4% fee for campaigns that reached their funding goals, while unsuccessful campaigns incurred a 9% fee.

== See also ==
- Comparison of crowd funding services
