= South Bank =

Commercial and entertainment district in London

Coordinates: 51.508°N 0.110°W

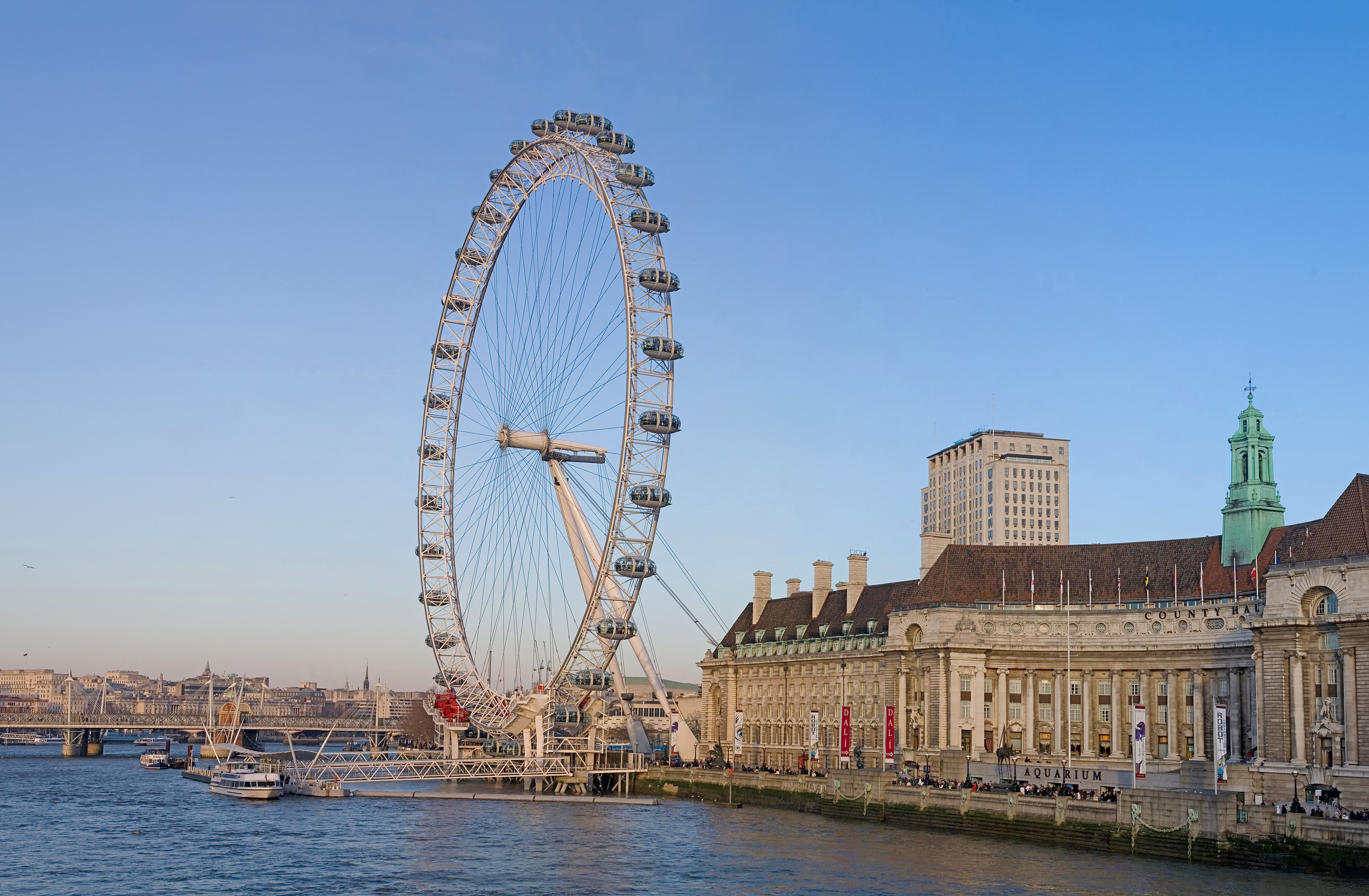
- The London Eye on the South Bank at County Hall

- Location within Greater London
- London borough: Lambeth; Southwark
- Ceremonial county: Greater London
- Region: London
- Country: England
- Sovereign state: United Kingdom
- Post town: LONDON
- Postcode district: SE1
- Dialling code: 020
- Police: Metropolitan
- Fire: London
- Ambulance: London
- London Assembly: Lambeth and Southwark

The South Bank is an entertainment and commercial area on the south bank of the River Thames, in the London Borough of Lambeth, central London, England.

The South Bank is not formally defined, but is generally understood to be situated between County Hall in the west to the Oxo Tower on the borough boundary with Southwark, to the east.

South Bank consists of a narrow strip of riverside land opposite the City of Westminster and adjoins the Albert Embankment to the west and Bankside in the London Borough of Southwark to the east. As such, the South Bank may be regarded as akin to the riverside part of an area known previously as Lambeth Marsh and North Lambeth.

Throughout its history, it has twice functioned as an entertainment district, interspersed by around a hundred years of wharfs, domestic industry and manufacturing being its dominant use. Change came in 1917 with the construction of County Hall at Lambeth replacing the Lion Brewery.

The name South Bank was first widely used in 1951 during the Festival of Britain. The festival redefined the area as a place for arts and entertainment.

The area's attractions include the County Hall complex, the Sea Life London Aquarium, the London Dungeon, Jubilee Gardens and the London Eye, the Southbank Centre, Royal Festival Hall, National Theatre, and BFI Southbank.

== History ==
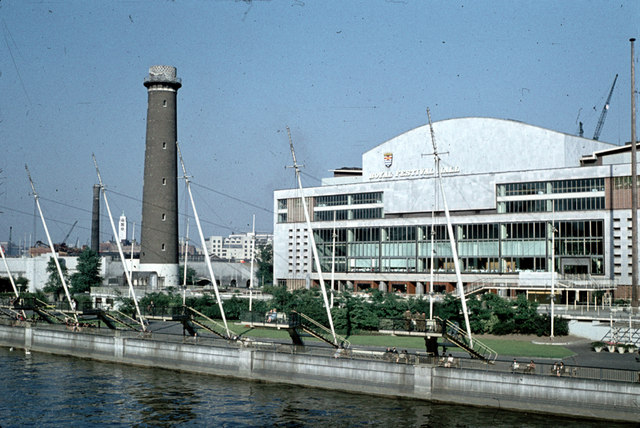
Royal Festival Hall c.1959 and the now-demolished Shot Tower.

Before the Thames was embanked, this area of Lambeth was often flooded, so the area was slower to develop than the north bank of the Thames.

During the Middle Ages this area developed as a place of entertainment outside the formal regulation of the City of London on the north bank; this included theatres, prostitution and bear-baiting. By the 18th century the more genteel entertainment of the pleasure gardens had developed.

By the 19th century, however, the usage had shifted to wharfs, domestic industry and manufacturing. The shallow bank and mud flats were ideal locations for industry and docks and went on to develop as an industrial location in a patchwork of private ownership.

In the 20th century usage once again shifted to entertainment. Change began in 1917 with the construction of County Hall, near North Lambeth's Lower Marsh. which replaced the Lion Brewery. Its Coade stone symbol was retained and placed on a pedestal at Westminster Bridge and is known as the South Bank Lion. The construction of County Hall returned the first section of river frontage to public use. This was extended eastwards in 1951 when a considerable area was redeveloped for the Festival of Britain. The area was renamed 'South Bank' as part of promoting the Festival. The legacy of the festival was mixed, with buildings and exhibits demolished to make way for Jubilee Gardens, while the Royal Festival Hall and The Queen's Walk were retained as part of the Southbank Centre. The Queen's Walk pedestrianised embankment is part of the Albert Embankment, built not only for public drainage but also to raise the whole tract of land to prevent flooding.

During the years following the festival the arts and entertainment complex grew with additional facilities, including the Queen Elizabeth Hall, and other arts venues opened along the river such as the Royal National Theatre. In 2000 the London Eye opened, adding a large visible attraction to the area. The recent developments, particularly the South Bank Place project by Canary Wharf Homes, underscore the ongoing transformation of the South Bank into a vibrant residential and cultural hub, a trend that is set to continue with more riverside projects on the horizon.

== Geography ==
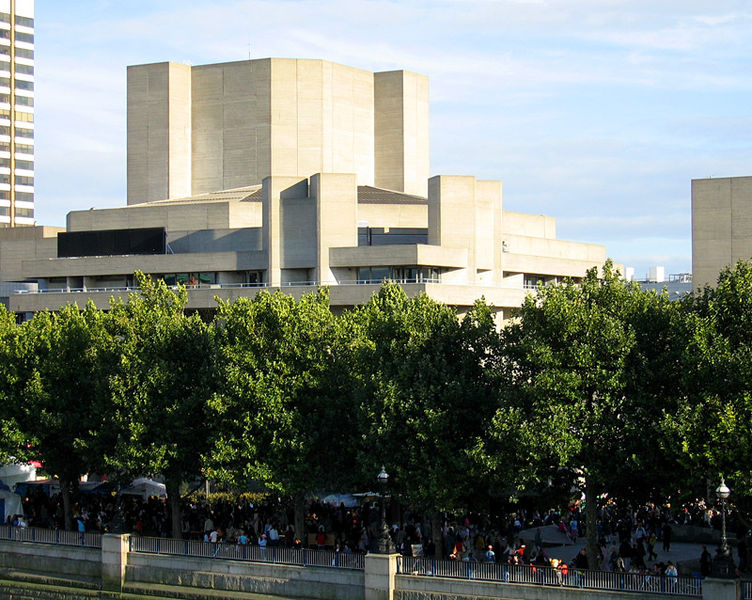
The National Theatre is one of the collection of arts buildings on the South Bank.

The South Bank is not formally defined, but is generally understood to be situated between County Hall in the west to the Oxo Tower on the borough boundary with Southwark, to the east.

South Bank consists of a narrow strip of riverside land opposite the City of Westminster and adjoins the Albert Embankment to the west and Bankside in the London Borough of Southwark to the east. As such, the South Bank may be regarded as akin to the riverside part of an area known previously as Lambeth Marsh and North Lambeth.

There are public open space along the riverside, including Bernie Spain Gardens between the London Studios and the Oxo Tower. The gardens were named after Bernadette Spain, a local community activist who was part of the Coin Street Action Group.

== Cultural aspects ==
The South Bank is a significant arts and entertainment district. The Southbank Centre comprises the Royal Festival Hall, the Queen Elizabeth Hall and The Hayward Gallery. The Royal National Theatre, the London IMAX super cinema and BFI Southbank adjoin to the east, but are not strictly part of the centre.

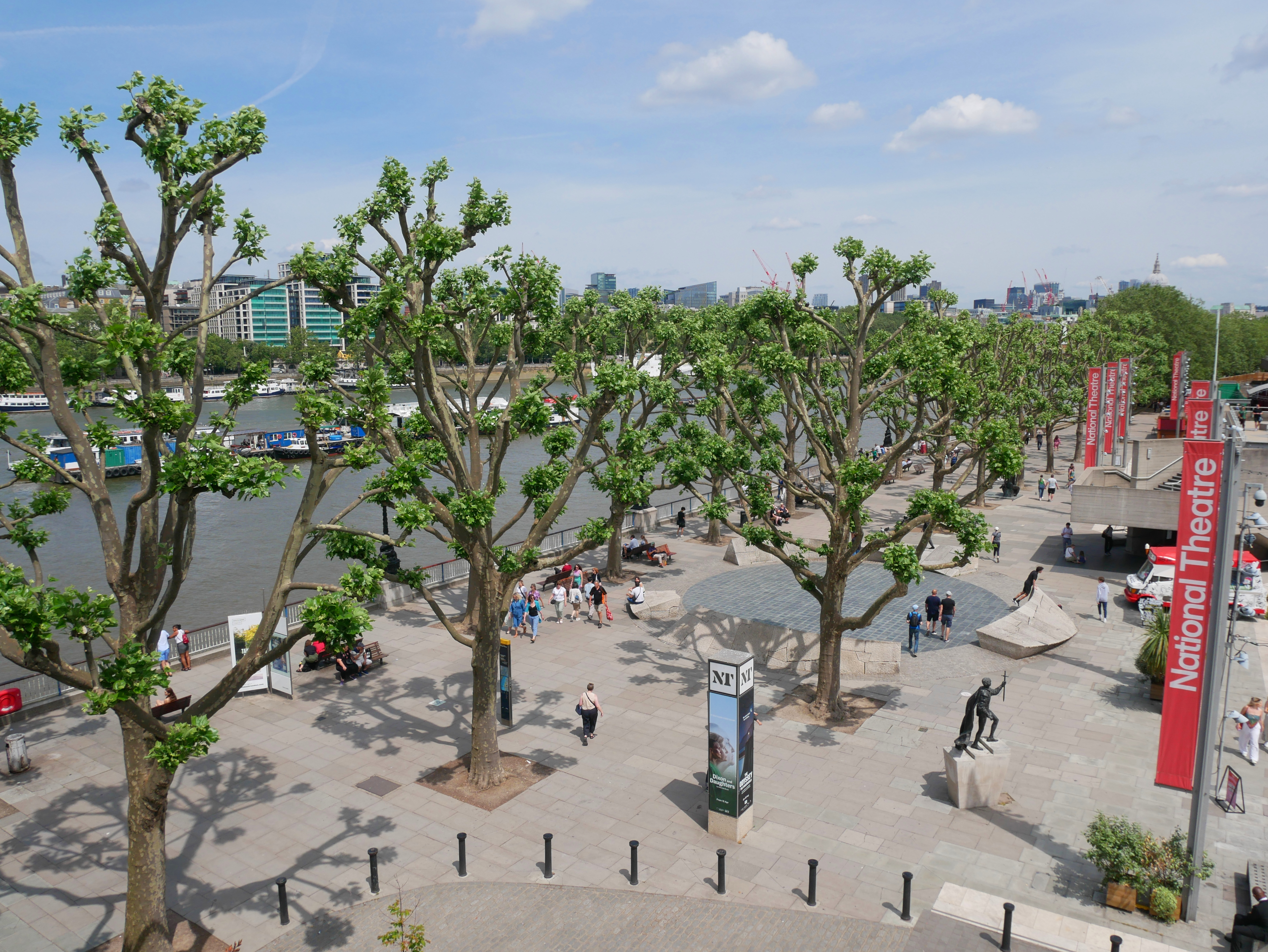
The South Bank outside Royal Festival Hall

Polish-British visual chronicler and artist Feliks Topolski was provided a studio under one of the arches of Hungerford Bridge in 1951, where he worked consistently until his death in 1989. Topolski was commissioned to produce a 60ft by 20ft mural under the arch over Belvedere Road for the Festival of Britain, unknowingly painting only two arches up from his eventual studio.[6] Offered to him by David Eccles, it was not until 1953 and Queen Elizabeth II's coronation, when the windows from the dismantled annex to Westminster Abbey were repurposed to fit Topolski's studio. Over the years the studio became a central feature of the South Bank, hosting countless people at his 'Open Studio' Fridays from 3pm, with an open door to whosever wished to pop their head in. Now the Studio functions as an archive and exhibition space operated by Topolski Memoir, the charity set up to preserve the artist's legacy.

Topolski was provided with three further arches in 1975 by the Greater London Council (GLC), where he painted his epic 600ft long, 12-20ft high 'Memoir of the Century'. Telling his broad-ranging experience of the 20th century, Topolski painted the work from 1975 until his death, writing that he hoped to die working on it, with a brush in his hand. It remained open until 2006 in its original state, working with students, but, due to its poor condition, underwent a £3,000,000 conservation and renovation program, funded by the Heritage Lottery Fund, private donations and several other grant bodies, and raised by the artist's son, Daniel Topolski. Reopened by the Duke of Edinburgh in 2009, the Memoir only ran for a year due to commercial pressures and was converted into the Bar Topolski, where some of Topolski's work can still be seen.

Buskers and street performers perform music, dance, and entertainment at various designated locations along the South Bank, under a licensing system that requires prospective performers to audition and provide a risk assessment and proof of insurance.

County Hall was converted into The London Marriott Hotel County Hall, Sea Life London Aquarium and the London Dungeon.

The OXO Tower Wharf at the eastern end of South Bank, houses Gallery@Oxo, shops and boutiques, and the OXO Tower Restaurant run by Harvey Nichols.

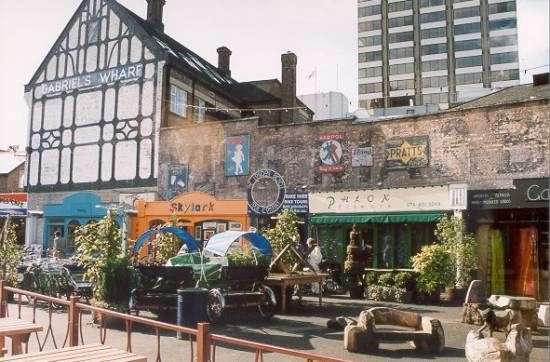
Gabriel's Wharf in 2000

The now closed Gabriel's Wharf was a redeveloped wharf on the South Bank, which had been converted into a shopping area.

The London Studios, the former home of ITV faces the Thames and Rambert Dance Company have their new studios on Upper Ground. The Old Vic and Young Vic theatres are nearby.

The Florence Nightingale Museum to nursing, medicine and the Crimean War adjoins the 'district'.

The undercroft of the Queen Elizabeth Hall has been used by skateboarders since the early 1970s. Originally an architectural dead-spot, it became a landmark of British skateboarding culture, but later was under threat, though supported by the Long Live Southbank campaign. In 2026 an exhibition, Skate 50, was held there, documenting fifty years of skateboarding in the Undercroft. Part of the Southbank Centre was turned into shops looking out over the river.

The South Bank was the main scene of the 1952 comedy film The Happy Family, set around the Festival of Britain.

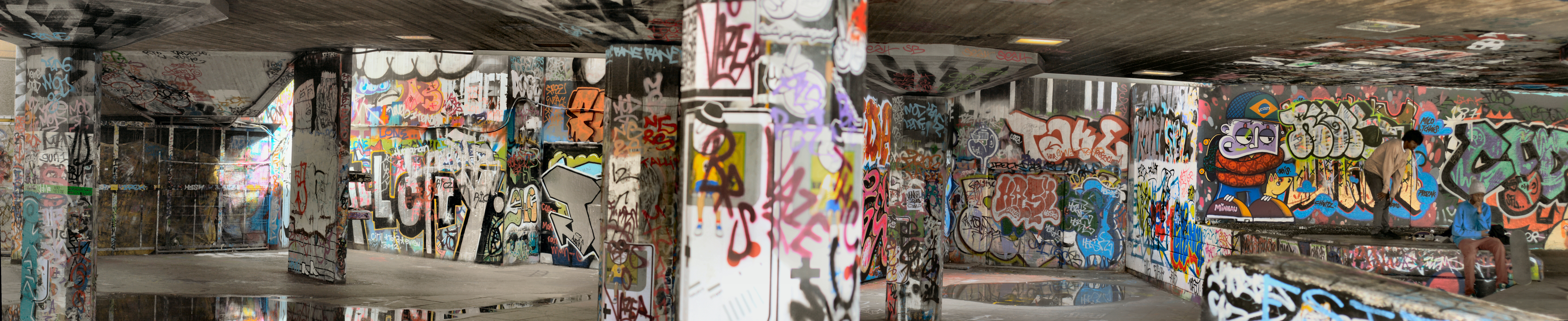
Graffiti and skaters in the undercroft at South Bank

== Transport ==
Part of the success of the area as a visitor attraction is attributed to the high levels of public transport access. Several major railway terminals are within walking distance of the South Bank, on both sides of the river, including Waterloo, Charing Cross and Blackfriars. The London Underground has stations on or near the South Bank, from west to east, at Westminster, Waterloo, Embankment, Blackfriars and Southwark.

The development of the Thameslink Blackfriars railway station in the early 2010s, which has access from both the southern and northern side of the river, prompted the additional named signage "for Bankside and South Bank". Accessibility to the north bank is high, with connections made, from west to east, over the Westminster, Golden Jubilee, Waterloo and Blackfriars bridges. The river is utilised as a means of transport with piers along the South Bank at the London Eye, Royal Festival Hall and Bankside.

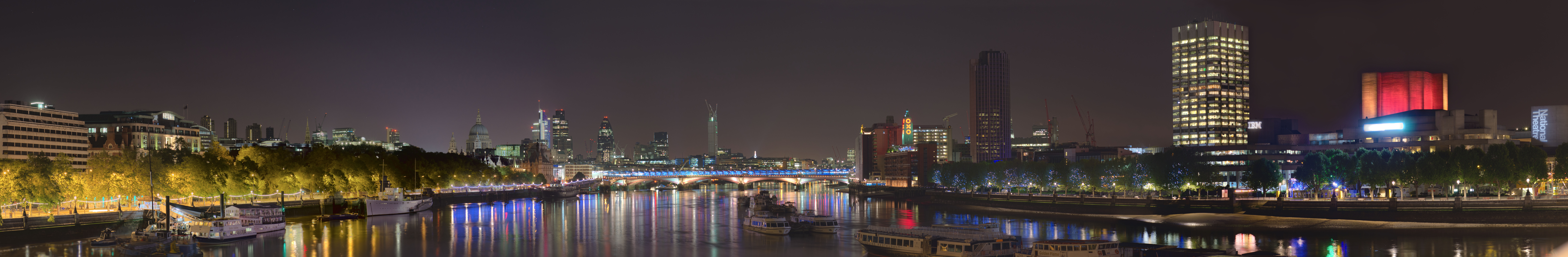
South Bank by night. Showing the illuminated National Theatre (right side of image), facing east; towards the City of London
