= Olimpia Dobrovolska =

Ukrainian theater actress

- Олімпія Добровольська
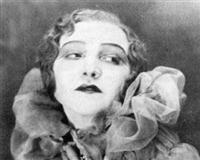
- Born: July 31, 1895; Odesa, Russian Empire (now Ukraine)
- Died: February 2, 1990 (aged 94); New York, United States
- Occupation(s): actress, theater director

Olimpia Ostapivna Dobrovolska (Note: Ukrainian: Олімпія Остапівна Добровольська, romanized: Olimpiia Ostapivna Dobrovolska) (July 31 (August 12) 1895 – February 2, 1990) was a Ukrainian actress, director, theater teacher and theorist of Ukrainian art of the 20th century. She was married the actor Yosyp Hirniak.

== Early life and education ==
Olimpia Dobrovolska was born on 31 July (12 August) 1895 in Odesa. In 1915, she graduated from Lysenko Drama Institute in Kyiv.

== Career ==
In 1916, 20-year-old Dobrovolska was associated with the Kurbas group and was one of the founders of the Kyiv Academic Young Theatre (Molodyi Teatr) and played there until 1919. Since the foundation of Franko Theater in January 1920 until 1922, Dobrovolska worked there. In Franko Theater, she met an actor Yosyp Hirniak and married him.

In 1922, Dobrovolska and her husband were among the first employees of the Berezil Theatre of Les Kurbas in Kyiv. In 1926, she moved to Kharkiv together with the Berezil theater.

In December 1933, Dobrovolska’s husband Hirniak was arrested by the Stalinists, and in 1934 he was exiled to the camps in Karelia on charges of participating in a “national terrorist organization”. Dobrovolska remained in Kharkiv, and since 1935, she joined the troupe of the Shevchenko Ukrainian Drama Theater in Kharkiv.

In 1937, Dobrovolska was arrested and exiled to Chibyu, Komi Autonomous Soviet Socialist Republic, along with her husband. There she worked in the Kosolapkin theater.

In 1940, Dobrovolska and her husband received permission to return to Ukraine and moved to Cherkasy where Dobrovlska worked in Cherkasy Drama Theater. In 1942, Dobrovolska and her husband moved to Lviv and lived there during Nazi occupation. During this time, she played on the stage of the Lviv Theatre of Opera and Ballet. In 1944, Dobrovolska was forced to emigrate to Austria, then to Germany.

Along with her husband, Dobrovolska directed the Theater studio in Austria and Germany. In 1947, their Theater studio came on tour to the American zone of Germany and since then operated in West Germany until 1949.

== Emigration to United States ==
In 1949, Dobrovolska and her husband emigrated to the United States. In 1949-50 season, they staged six plays in New York. In 1953-1955, Dobrovolska directed Ukrainian theater in the United States.

From 1956 to 1964, she headed the Theater of the Ukrainian Word in New York and her own school of artistic reading. As a director, Dobrovolska made productions Forest Song and Orgy by Lesya Ukrainka and Ghosts by Henrik Ibsen.

Olimpia Dobrovolska died on 2 February 1990 at a nursing home in New York at the age of 94.

== Honors ==
In 1985, a book Undefeated Berezil Actors by Valerian Revytsky dedicated to Dobrovolska and Hirniak was published in New York.
