= Andrzej Szczytko =

Polish actor (1955–2021)

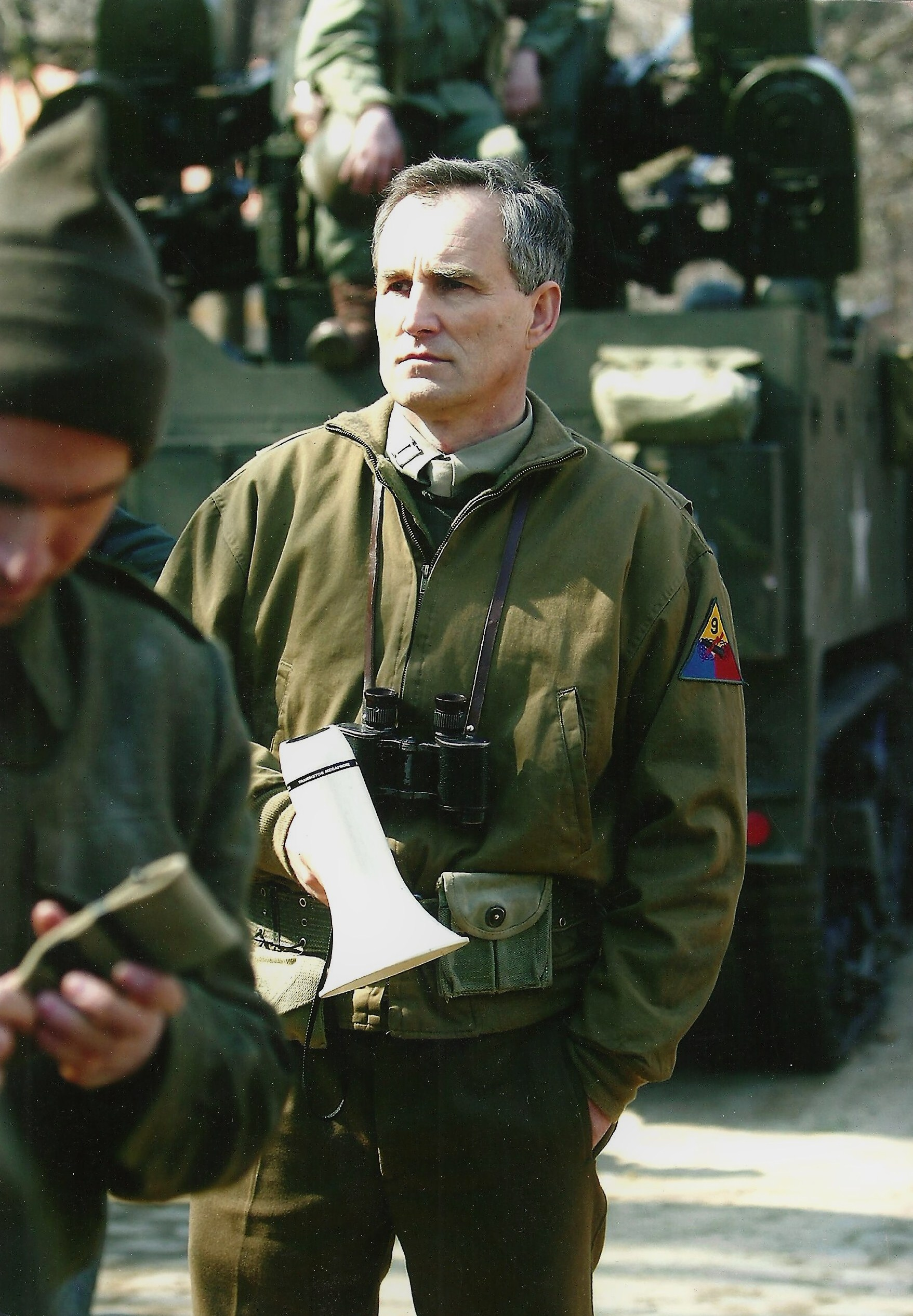
- Szczytko as Captain Gregg (2006)
- Born: Andrzej Szczytko; 9 October 1955; Grajewo, Poland
- Died: 11 June 2021 (aged 65); Poznań, Poland
- Education: National Film School in Łódź (MFA)
- Occupations: Actor; Theatre Director
- Years active: 1977–2021
- Awards: Witkacy Prize - Critics' Circle Award (2016)
- Honours: Silver Medal for Merit to Culture – Gloria Artis Decoration of Honor Meritorious for Polish Culture

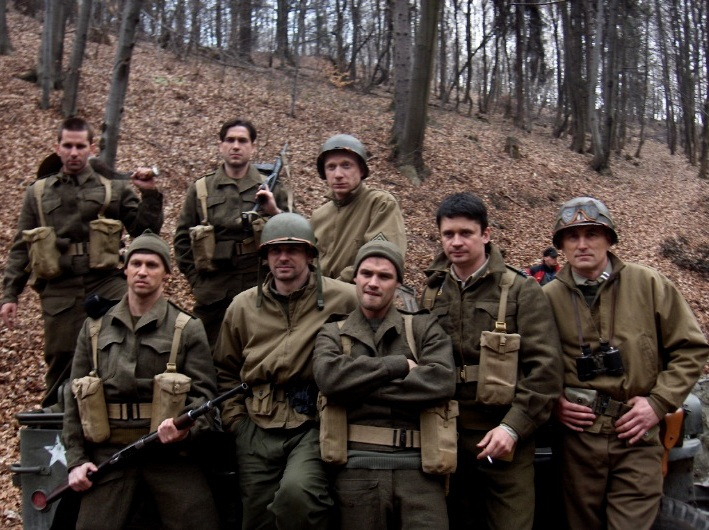
Szczytko with the cast of Mystery of the Codes Stronghold (2006)

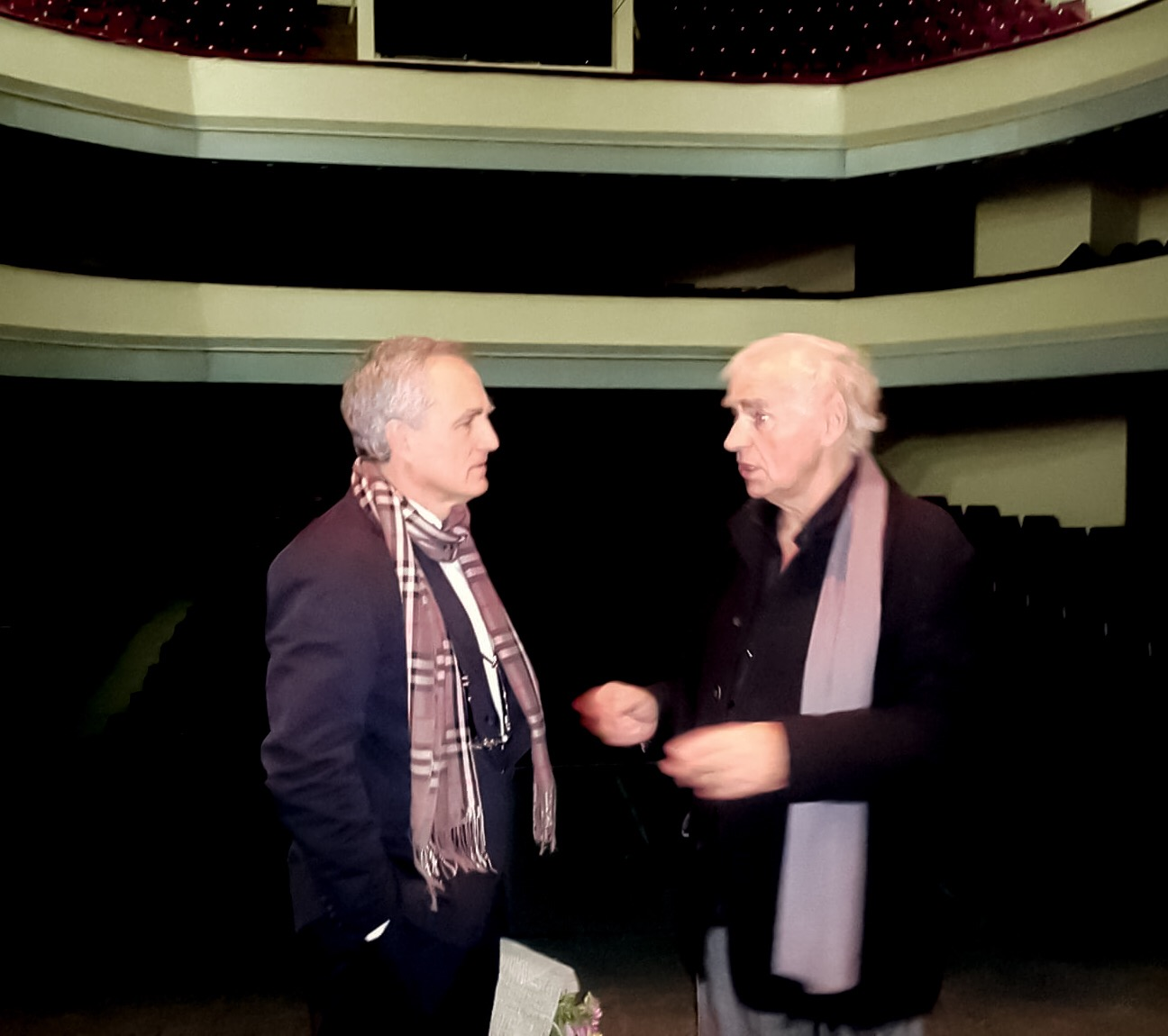
Szczytko and Janusz Głowacki (Kharkiv Ukrainian Drama Theatre, 2014)

Andrzej Szczytko (9 October 1955 – 11 June 2021) was a Polish actor and stage director. Szczytko is the recipient of multiple theatre awards and honours, including the 2016 Witkacy Prize - Critics' Circle Award. He was awarded the Decoration of Honor "Meritorious for Polish Culture" in 2012 for his contribution to Polish culture, and in 2017, the Silver Medal for Merit to Culture – Gloria Artis.

== Career ==
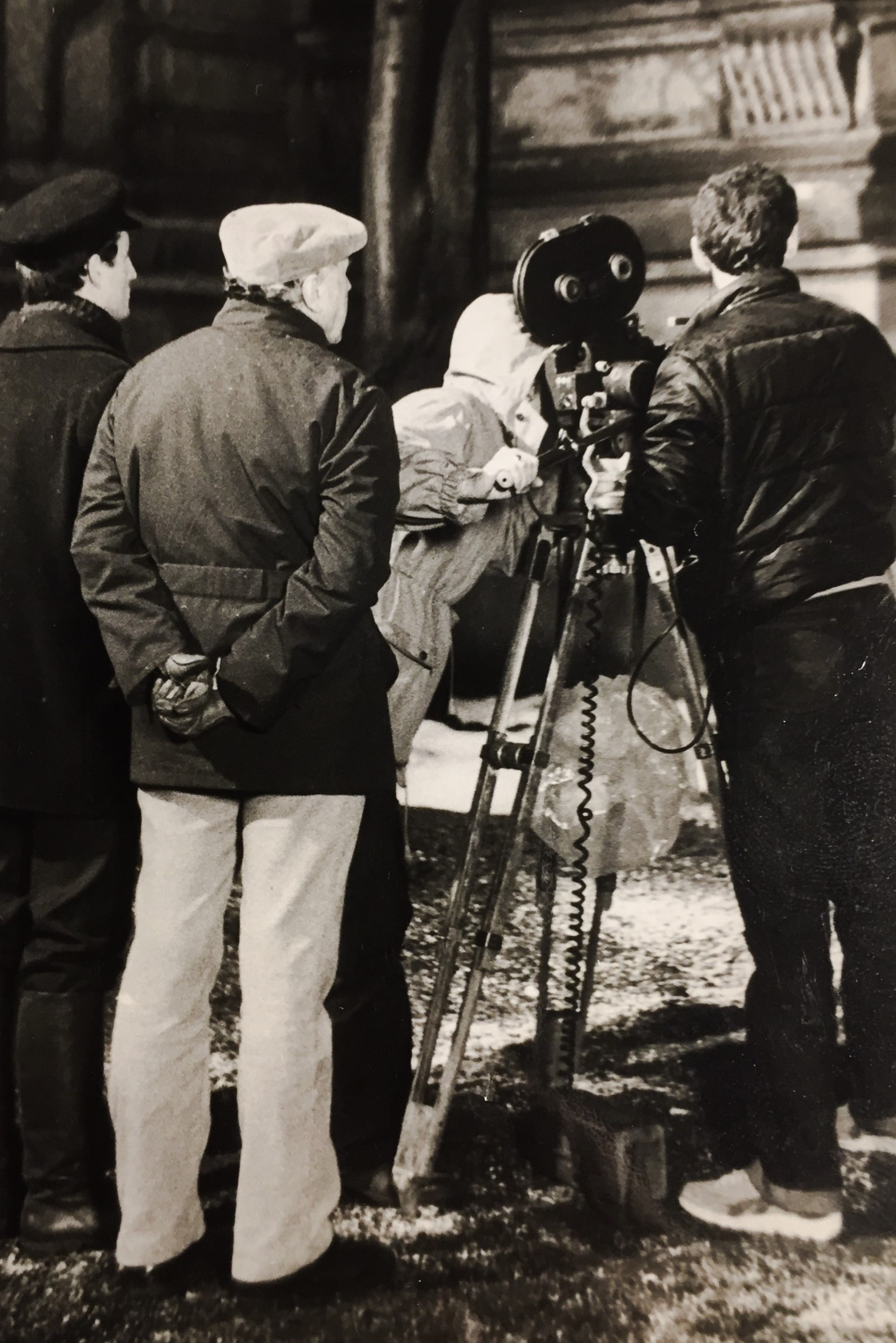
Andrzej Szczytko and Zbigniew Kuźmiński on the set of Republic of Hope (1984)

Graduate of National Film School in Łódź (1978), where he studied alongside Jacek Koman. Szczytko was also trained at DePaul University's Goodman School of Drama (1980). He made his first professional stage appearance in 1977 as a Lentulus in a production of Androcles and the Lion directed by the reformer of Polish mime theatre, Henryk Tomaszewski.

Szczytko has had a prolific career in theatre, particularly repertory theatre, in Poland and Eastern Europe. He was a permanent troupe member of the Cyprian Norwid Theatre in Jelenia Góra (1977–78), the Aleksander Węgierko Theatre in Białystok (1978–1980), the Contemporary Theatre in Szczecin (1980), the Polish Theatre in Szczecin (1981–83), the Leon Kruczkowski Theater in Zielona Góra (1993–95), the Polish Theatre in Poznań (1983–2000), the Music Theatre in Poznań (2007–2008), the New Theatre in Łódź (2009–2012).

From 1991 to 1993 Szczytko was an artistic director of the Polish Institute of Theatre Arts in New York City. Between 1998 and 2000 he worked for Polish Theatre in Poznań as an associate intendant, as well as acting general intendant in 2000. From 2012 to 2017 he served as a guest director in the Kharkiv Ukrainian Drama Theatre, where his productions gained the reputation of political theatre.

He collaborated with some of the most renowned theatre directors, all of whom would have a huge impact on Szczytko's future career. Among them were Krystian Lupa (as Mandelabum in Witkacy's Dainty Shapes and Hairy Apes, or The Green Pill), Alina Obidniak (as Orestes in Johann Wolfgang von Goethe's Iphigenia in Tauris), Wanda Laskowska (as Doctor in James Joyce's Ulysses), Lech Raczak (as Titorelli in Franz Kafka's The Trial), Jerzy Kreczmar (as German in August Strindberg's Master Olof), Roman Kłosowski (as Joe in William Saroyan's The Time of Your Life) and Krzysztof Babicki (as Gottlieb Biedermann in Max Frisch's The Fire Raisers).

He continued to act in theatre for most of his career, and became noted for his portrayal of Bruce Niles in Larry Kramer's play The Normal Heart, but became better known once he started to work with movie directors Zbigniew Kuźmiński, Andrzej Konic and Adek Drabiński. He later acted, with acclaim, in their movies and miniseries, including Republic of Hope (1988) opposite Barbara Brylska and Leon Niemczyk, The Burning Border (1988–1991), Sensations of the 20th Century (2001–2005), and Mystery of the Codes Stronghold (2007).

== Filmography (selected) ==
- Mother Courage and Her Children (TVP 1, 1983) – Sergeant
- Republic of Ostrów (TVP 1, 1986) – Feliks Krogulecki
- Republic of Hope (1988) – Feliks Krogulecki
- The Burning Border (TVP 1, 1988−1991) – Lieutenant Lenart
- The Normal Heart (TVP 1, 1989) – Bruce Niles
- Poznań '56 (1996) – Surgeon
- With Fire and Sword (1999) – Otaman
- Teachers (Polsat, 2000−2001) – Zbigniew Szawdzianiec, chemistry teacher
- For better and for worse (TVP 2, 2001−2004) – Doctor Biernacki
- Gloria Victoribus! (TVP 1, 2003) – Colonel Bohdan Hulewicz
- The Mysterious Castle (TVP 1, 2004) – Commander Howard Campaigne from TICOM
- The Venlo Incident (TVP 1, 2004) – Bert Sas
- The Red Orchestra (TVP 1, 2005) – an Oberst of Abwehr
- The Wave of Crimes (Polsat, 2006) – Zygmunt Rokicki, Vice-Minister of Finance
- The File (2007) – Włodzimierz Ostrowski
- Mystery of the Codes Stronghold (TVP 1, 2007) – Captain Thomas Gregg
- Father Matthew (TVP 1, 2009−2011) – Rector
- True Law (TVN, 2014) – Military Judge
- Our Century (TVP 1, 2019) – President Ignacy Mościcki

== See also ==
- Polish cinema
- List of Polish actors and actresses
