= Danuta Chudzianka =

Polish actress (1941–2011)

- Born: 14 July 1941; Guta-Pereima, Ukrainian SSR, Soviet Union (now part of Ukraine)
- Died: 27 September 2011 (aged 70); Szczecin, Poland
- Education: Łódź Film School
- Occupation: Actress
- Years active: 1963–2011

Bronisława Danuta Chudzianka-Mamont (Note: Polish pronunciation: [brɔ.ɲiˈswa.va daˈnu.ta xuˈd͡ʑan.ka ˈma.mɔnt]) (born 14 July 1941 – 27 August 2011) was a Polish stage actress.

== Biography ==
Danuta Chudzianka was born on 14 July 1941 in Guta-Pereima, a village then located in the Soviet Union, and now in Rivne Oblast, Ukraine.

She has graduated from the Łódź Film School, and debuted on the stage of the Popular Theatre in Łódź. Throughout her career he was associated with the Contemporary Theatre in Szczecin, Polish Theatre in Bydgoszcz, and Polish Theatre in Szczecin. She was also an acting teacher. In 2011, Chudzianka was awarded the Gloria Artis Medal for Merit to Culture. She died on 27 August 2021 in Szczecin, and was buried at the Central Cemetery.

== Filmography ==
Year	Title	Role	Notes
1963	Weekendy. Julia		Feature film; uncredited
1966	Dzieci słońca	Łusza	Television play
1966	Jeźdźcy do morza		Television play
1966	W małym domku		Television play
1967	Morska nawigacyja do Lubeka	Prakseda	Television play
1969	Henryk V	Elizabeth Mortimer	Television play
1969	Playboy zachodniego świata		Television play
1984	Sprawa osobista	Gambling house owner	Television film
1989	The Last Ferry	Ferry passenger	Feature film
1999	Paderewskiego życie po życiu	Wilkońska	Feature film

== Awards and decorations ==
- Gloria Artis Medal for Merit to Culture (2011)
