= Les Kurbas Art Museum =

- Мистецький музей Леся Курбаса
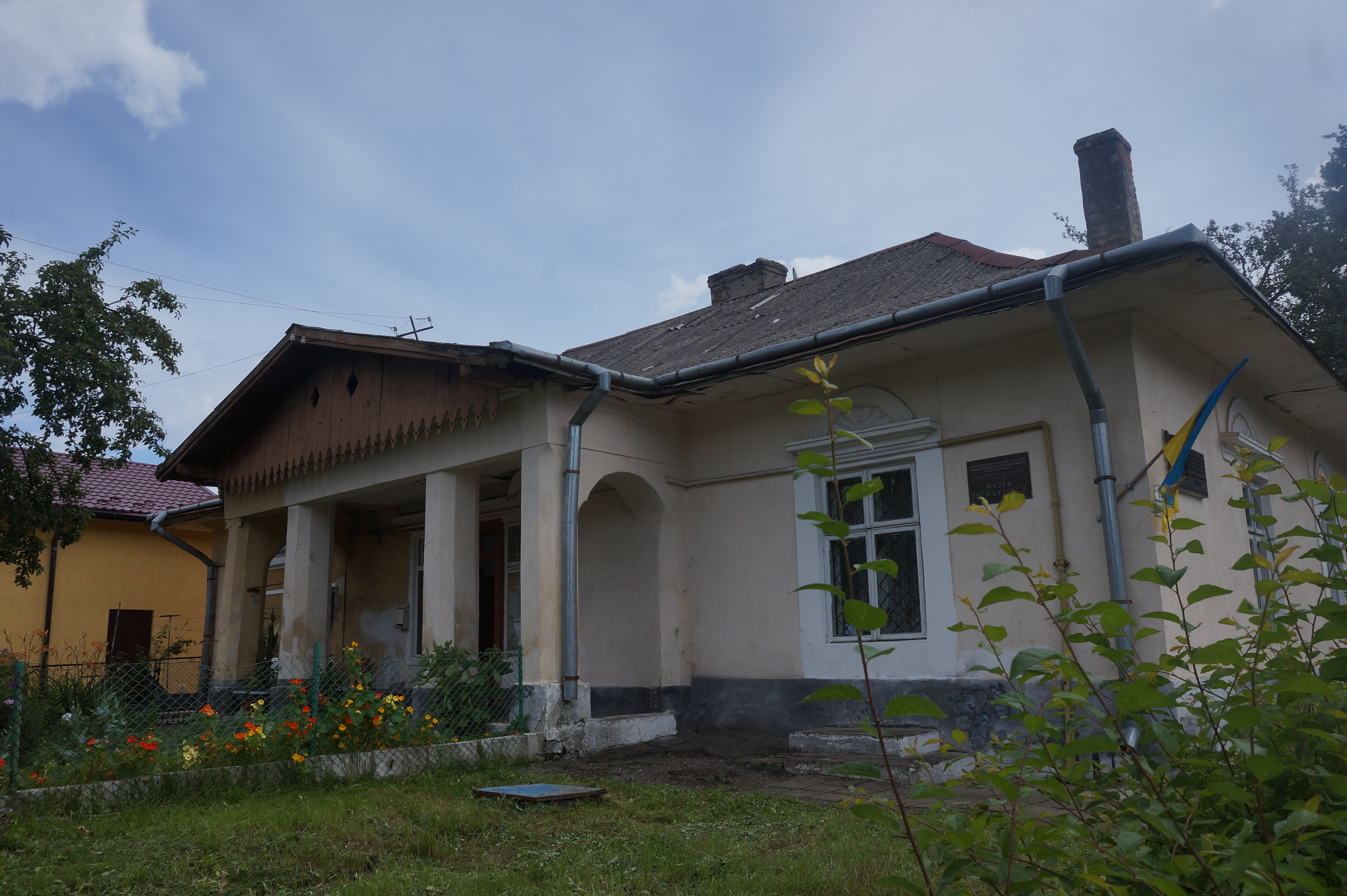
- Established: 25 February 1993
- Location: Ukraine; Lviv Oblast; Sambir
- Coordinates: 49.5161°N 23.1918°E
- Type: Art Museum
- Collection size: 6,634
- Director: Lyubov Stepanivna Tepla

The Les Kurbas Art Museum (Ukrainian: Мистецький музей Леся Курбаса) is a state museum in Sambir, Ukraine. It is a branch of the Andrey Sheptytsky National Museum, dedicated to the life and work of Ukrainian theater figure Les Kurbas.

== History ==
In 1991, the Lviv Regional Council decided to establish the Les Kurbas Art and Memorial Museum in Sambir as a branch of the National Museum in Lviv.

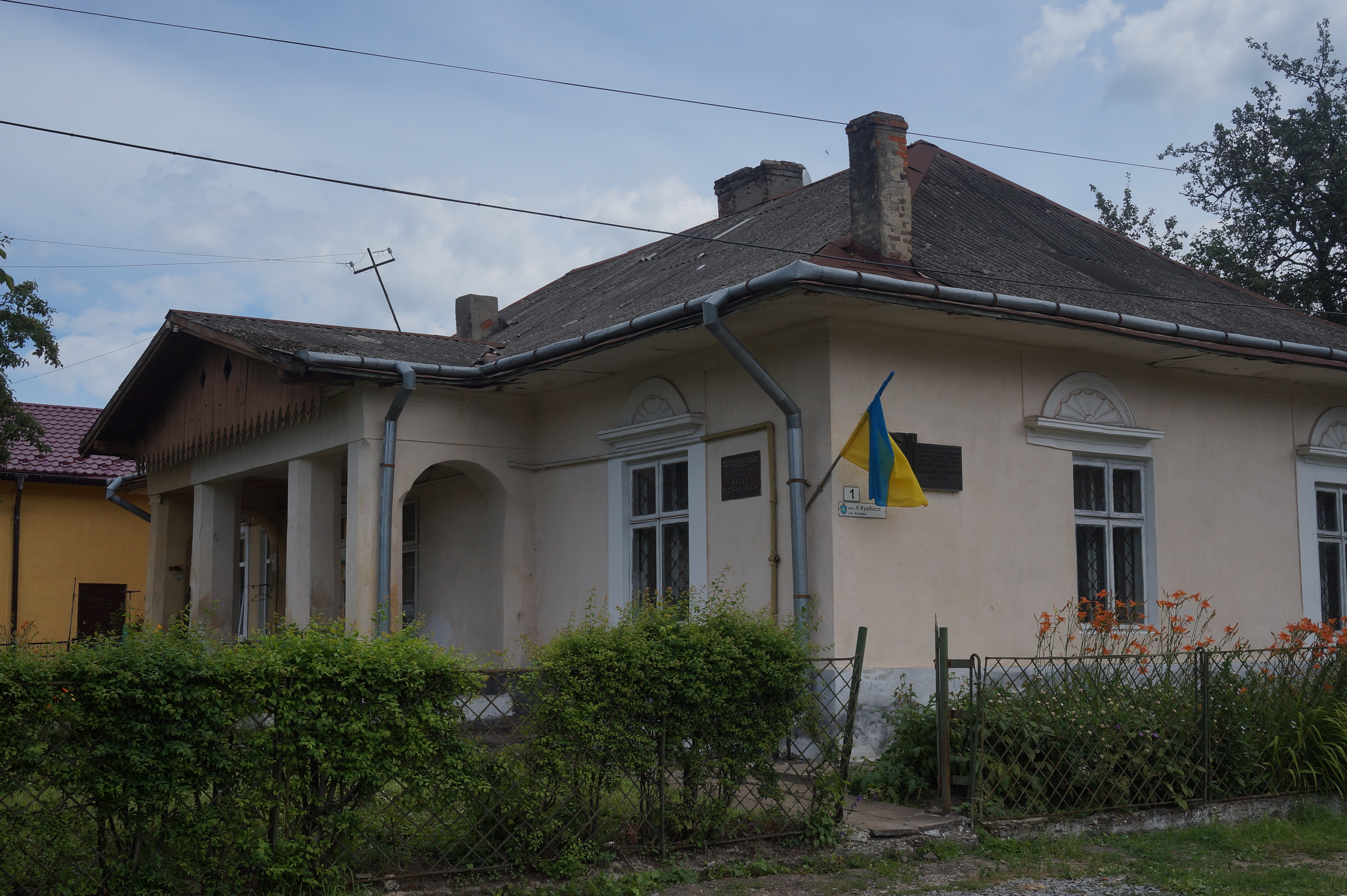
The house where Les Kurbas was born

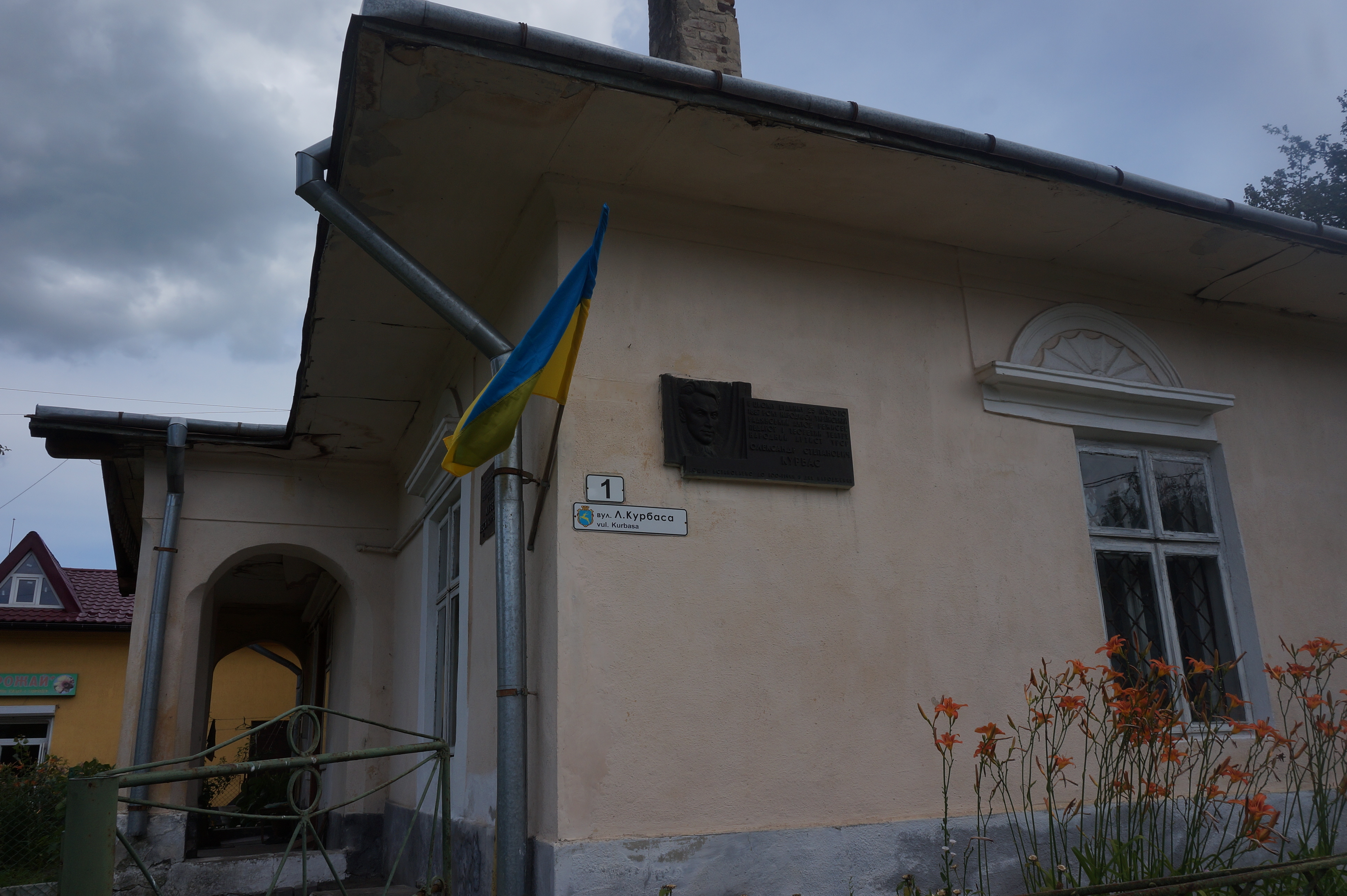
Memorial bas-relief plaque by sculptor Emmanuil Mysko

The museum was opened on 25 February 1993 in the house at Sonyachna St. 1, where Les Kurbas was born. The museum building, constructed in 1887, is a local architectural monument. By a decree of the Cabinet of Ministers of Ukraine dated 27 December 2001, the Les Kurbas house-museum in Sambir was included in the State Register of Immovable Monuments of Ukraine of national significance.

Following a reorganization in 2010, the museum was renamed the "Les Kurbas Art Museum."

== Description ==
The Les Kurbas Art Museum is housed in three rooms. The exhibition materials introduce visitors to Les Kurbas's work in theaters such as "Ternopil Theater Evenings," "Young Theater," and the "Berezil" artistic association.

In 2017, the Les Kurbas Art Museum was renovated.

== Museum collections ==
The museum's collections consist of 6,634 items. These include photographs and postcards, graphic portraits of Les Kurbas by artists Yevhen Beznisko and Stepan Muriash, the portrait "Les Kurbas with Kobzar" by artist Yaroslav Matselyukh, a bust of Les Kurbas by sculptor Mykola Posikira (1987), a memorial bas-relief plaque by sculptor Emmanuil Mysko (1987), and artworks by artists Mykhailo Yaremkiv, M. Fatych, O. Bihanovsky, V. Sorokin, Lesia Fryntsko, H. Prokopovych, T. Nenyuk, and H. Kachmaryk, as well as photographs and posters from 1933, 1946, and 1955.

== Activities ==
The Les Kurbas Art Museum organizes public events in schools and educational institutions, opens traveling exhibitions, and engages in lectures and scholarly collection work.
