= Hirniak =

Hirniak is a surname. Notable people with the surname include:

- Stefan Hirniak (born 1985), Canadian swimmer
- Yosyp Hirniak (1895–1989), Ukrainian-American theater actor and director
