= Polish Theatre =

Polish Theatre may refer to:

- Polish Theatre in Bydgoszcz
- Polish Theatre in Poznań
- Polish Theatre in Warsaw
- Theatre of Poland
