= Yosyp Hirniak =

Ukrainian-American theater actor and director (1895–1989)

- Born: April 14, 1895; Strusiv, Podillia, Ukraine.
- Died: January 17, 1989 (aged 93); New York NY
- Resting place: St. Mary's Ukrainian Catholic Cemetery in Fox Chase, Philadelphia
- Known for: Actor, director
- Spouse: Olimpiia Dobrovolska

Yosyp Hirniak (1895–1989; Ukrainian: Йосип Гірняк) was a Ukrainian-American theater actor and director, known for his work in both Ukraine and the United States. Together with his wife, Olimpiia Dobrovolska, he founded the Ukrainian Theater in America (1954–1957) and the Theater of the Word (1956–64) in the United States.

== Early life and career ==
Hirniak was born on April 14, 1895 in Strusiv, Podillia, Ukraine. His interest in the arts, particularly theater, began during his high school years. His professional acting career started in 1914 at the Ruska Besida (Ruthenian Conversation) Theater. In 1915, he was a volunteer at the Ukrainian Sich Riflemen. In 1919, he worked with the Molodyy Theater (Young Theater) in Kyiv, and in 1922, he and his wife became some of the first members of the Berezil Theater, collaborating with the Ukrainian theater director Les Kurbas.

In 1934, Hirniak was arrested and convicted, serving his sentence in the Ukhtopechlag labor camp. During World War II, he returned to Galicia, where he worked at the Lviv Opera House.

== Work in Ukrainian-American theater ==
In 1944, Hirniak and his wife emigrated to Austria and later moved to Germany. In 1949, they moved to the United States, where their first production was M. Khvylovy's play "Mother and I." which premiered in NYC on the 9th of October. They directed The Ukrainian Theater in America which they founded, reviving some of Berezil's productions, including M. Kulish's "Myna Mazaylo," where he played the main character.

In addition to his work in theater, Hirniak was a stage director and announcer for Radio Liberty in America. He also wrote; first book was The Theater-Studio of Joseph Hirniak and Olimpia Dobrovolska. In 1982, Yosef Hirniak published his Memoirs. In 1985, Valerian Revutsky published Neskoreni Bereziltsi which was dedicated to the work of Hirniak and his wife O. Dobrovolska during their early career.

Yosyp Hirniak died at home, on January 17, 1989 in New York City and was buried at St. Mary's Ukrainian Catholic Cemetery in Fox Chase, Philadelphia, Pennsylvania.
