= Andriy Zholdak =

Ukrainian theatre director (born 1962)

Andriy Zholdak (Ukrainian: Андрій Жолдак, born 18 November 1962) is a Ukrainian theatre director. From 2002 to 2005 he was the director at the Kharkiv Ukrainian Drama Theatre in Kharkiv. In 2006 Zholdak moved to Germany and worked at Theater Oberhausen, Berliner Festspiele and Vienna Festival. UNESCO Award in Performing Arts (2004).
