= Lech Raczak =

Polish theatre director (1946–2020)

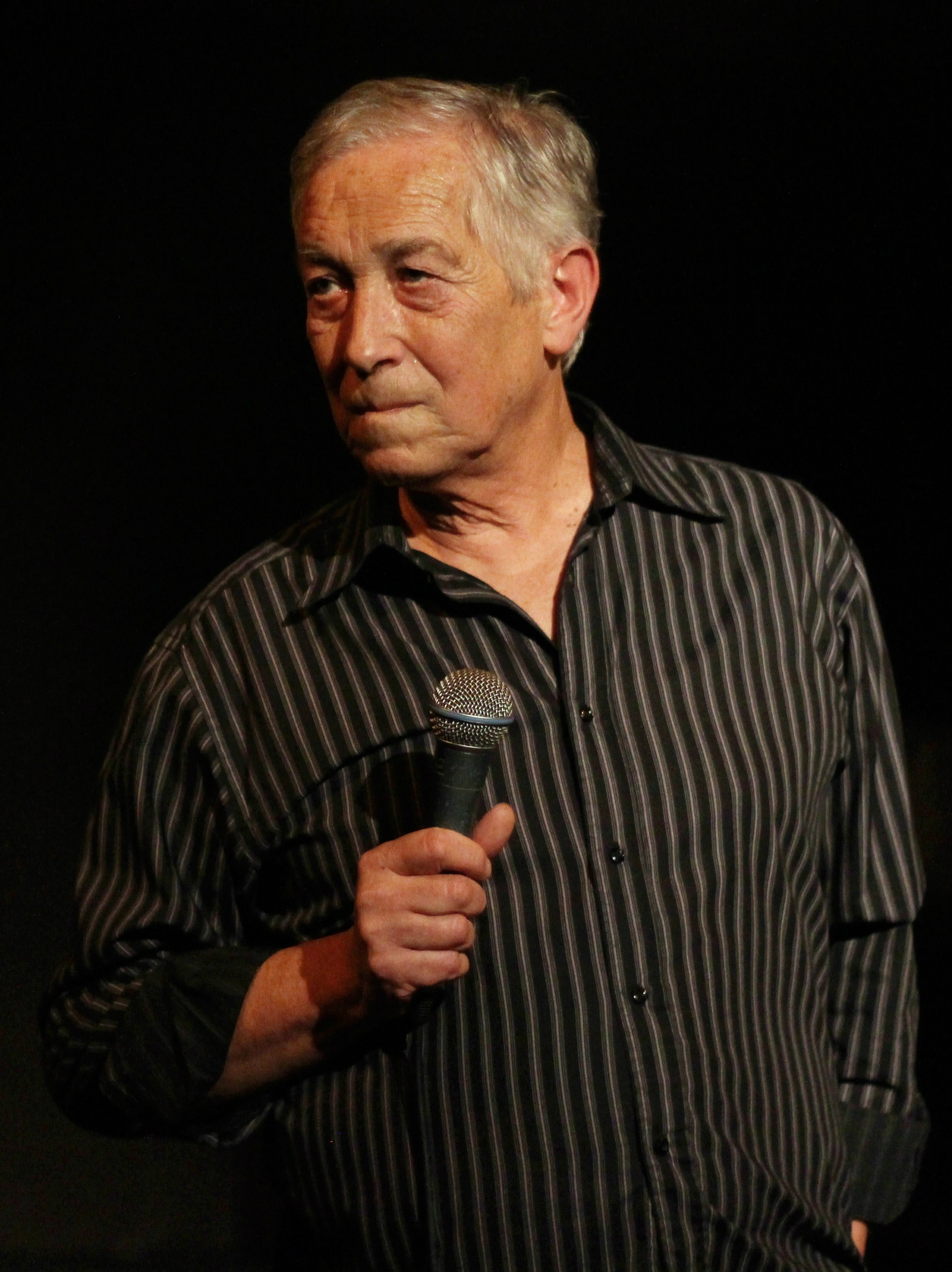
- Lech Raczak (2016)
- Born: 27 January 1946; Poznań, Poland
- Died: 17 January 2020 (aged 73); Poznań, Poland
- Education: Adam Mickiewicz University in Poznań
- Occupation: stage director
- Years active: 1964 – 2020
- Awards: Swinarski Award (1993)
- Honours: Silver Medal for Merit to Culture – Gloria Artis

Lech Raczak (27 January 1946 – 17 January 2020) was a Polish theatre director and theatre practitioner.

== Career ==
He studied Polish literature on Adam Mickiewicz University in Poznań. He was one of the founders of the Theatre of the Eighth Day, which was one of the most original and most significant groups of the student theater movement from which Polish alternative theater arose. In 1993 Raczak and ensemble of the Theatre of the Eighth Day received the Swinarski Award. From 1995 to 1998 Raczak was an artistic director of Polish Theatre in Poznań and between 1993 and 2012 he worked for Malta Festival as an artistic director. Since 2003 he was a professor at University of Arts in Poznań.
