= Yefrosyniya Zarnytska =

Ukrainian theater actress (1867–1936)

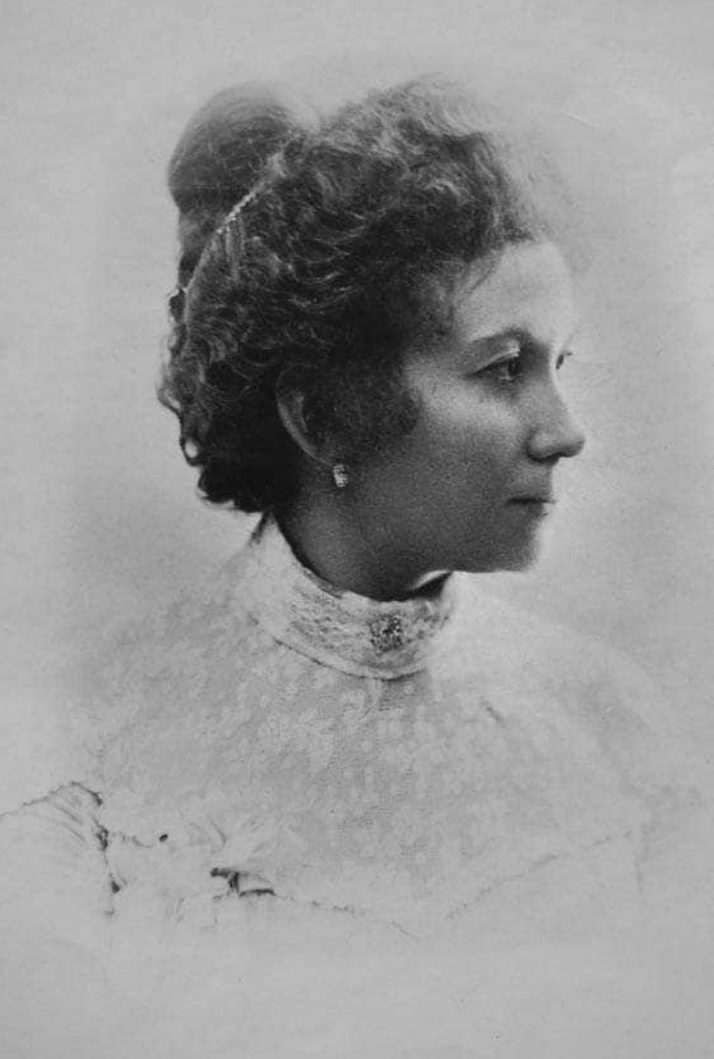
- Born: Yefrosyniya Azguridi; 2 April 1867; Odessa, Russian Empire
- Died: 30 June 1936 (aged 69); Pervomaisk, Ukrainian SSR
- Occupation: actress

Yefrosyniya Zarnytska, (Ukrainian: Єфросинія Зарницька) real name Yefrosyniya Azguridi (Ukrainian: Єфросинія Азгуріді) (4 (16) February 1867 – 30 June 1936) was a Ukrainian theater actress and singer.

== Early life and education ==
Yefrosynia Azguridi was born on 4 (16) February 1867 in Odesa. Her father Philip Azguridi was Greek merchant owning a tobacco factory, her mother Kaolina Klodnytska was from the Polish nobility. Azguridi spent her childhood and adolescence in the family estate in the village of Katerinka in Kherson province. In 1886, Azguiridi graduated from the Odesa Music School of the Society of Fine Arts under the director Baron Kaulbarsi.

== Career ==
In the summer of 1888, Azguiridi got acquainted with Marko Kropyvnytskyi who was looking for talent for his new troupe. Kropyvnytsky offered Azguiridi a job as a professional actress in the lead roles in his troupe. In 1888, Azguiridi became her stage career under the stage name Yefrosyniya Zarnytska in the newly formed troupe of Kropyvnytsky in Katerynoslav. Zarnytska performed in the troupe of Kropyvnytsky until 1893.

From September 1893 to September 1894 Zarnytska was the leading actress of the Heorhii Derkach troupe. During this time, she performed in Paris, Marseille, and Bordeaux with Derkach troupe. In 1894–1909, Zarnytska played in the troupes of Onysym Suslov and Oleksii Sukhodolsky.

In 1910, Zarnytska made a record of Ukrainian songs in "Zonophone" company.

From 1914 to 1924, Zarnytska lived in Petrograd, where she performed in Ukrainian performances and was involved in the organization and opening in 1919 of the Ukrainian Taras Shevchenko Theater.

In 1924, Zarnytska returned to Ukraine and organized a theater in Katerynka village of the Pervomaisky district of the Nikolaev region.

Since 1926, Zarnytska was an actress at the Kharkiv State Drama Theater and the Kharkiv National Theater. In 1931, she left the stage and settled in Pervomaisk.

Yefrosyniya Zarnytska died on 30 June 1936 in Pervomaisk.

== Honors ==
In Pervomaisk, the lane and the city Center of Culture and Leisure are named after Zarnytska. A memorial plaque has been erected on the facade of the building housing the Center. In 2020, a literary and musical composition "Artistic Soul" dedicated to Zarnytska was presented in the interactive museum of the Mykolaiv Ukrainian Theater of Drama and Musical Comedy.
