= Republika nadziei =

1988 Polish historical film

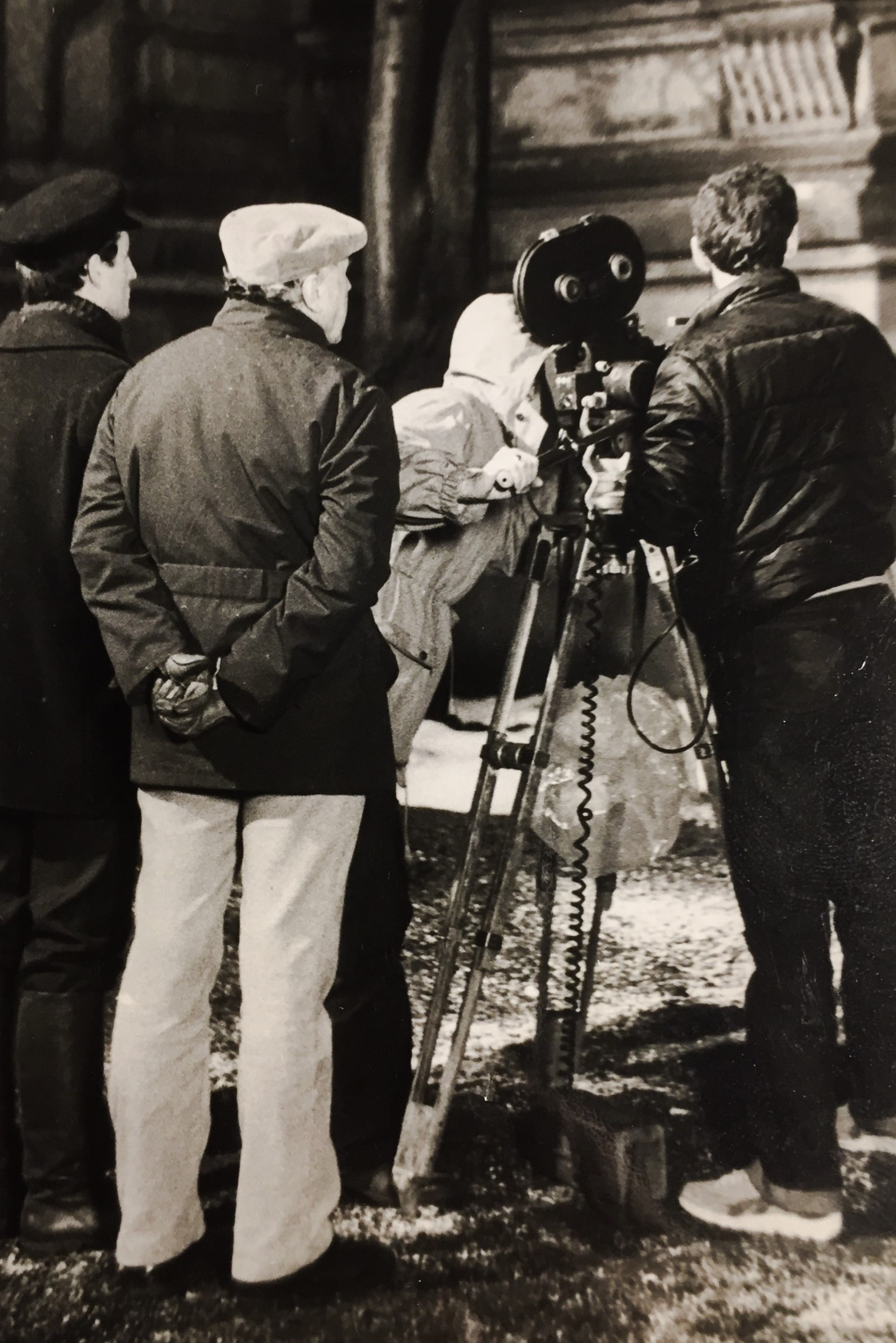
From the left: Andrzej Szczytko (actor), Zbigniew Kuźmiński (director), Karol Chodura (2nd director), Tomasz Tarasin (director of cinematography) in 1984 on the set of miniseries Republic of Ostrów (1986) and later feature film Republic of Hope (1988).

Republic of Hope (Polish: Republika nadziei) is a 1988 Polish historical film created by Zbigniew Kuźmiński and written by Kuźmiński and Kazimierz Radowicz. Film is based on the miniseries The Republic of Ostrów (Polish: Republika Ostrowska) which premiered on TVP on June 4, 1986.

Set in 1918, the film revolves around two landed gentry families (Kroguleccy and Wodniczakowie) from Greater Poland whose lives intersect. At its core, it is the story of the secret society (The Tomasz Zan Society) which helped organizing a short-lived autonomous republic called the Republic of Ostrów. The film explores a wide variety of themes, including Greater Poland uprising (1918–19), Polish youth lives during the age of partitions, and a rapidly changing social and political climate.

Republic of Hope earned much critical acclaim and accolades including the 1986 Golden Screen Award. It was filmed between 1984 and 1985 in Gołuchów Castle and Schloss Gorkau among others, and released in 1988.

== Cast ==
Locations where miniseries and film were shot

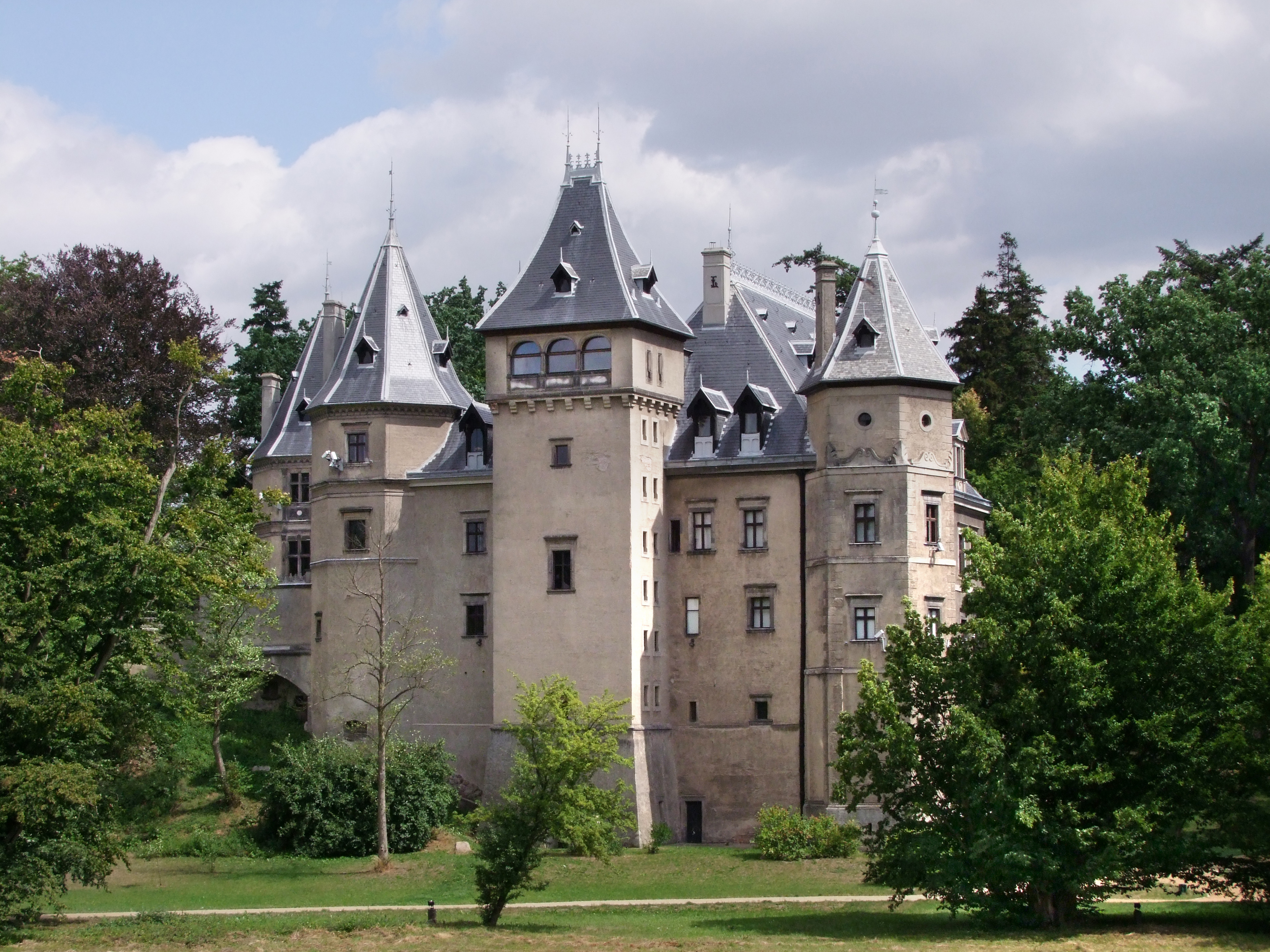
Gołuchów Castle

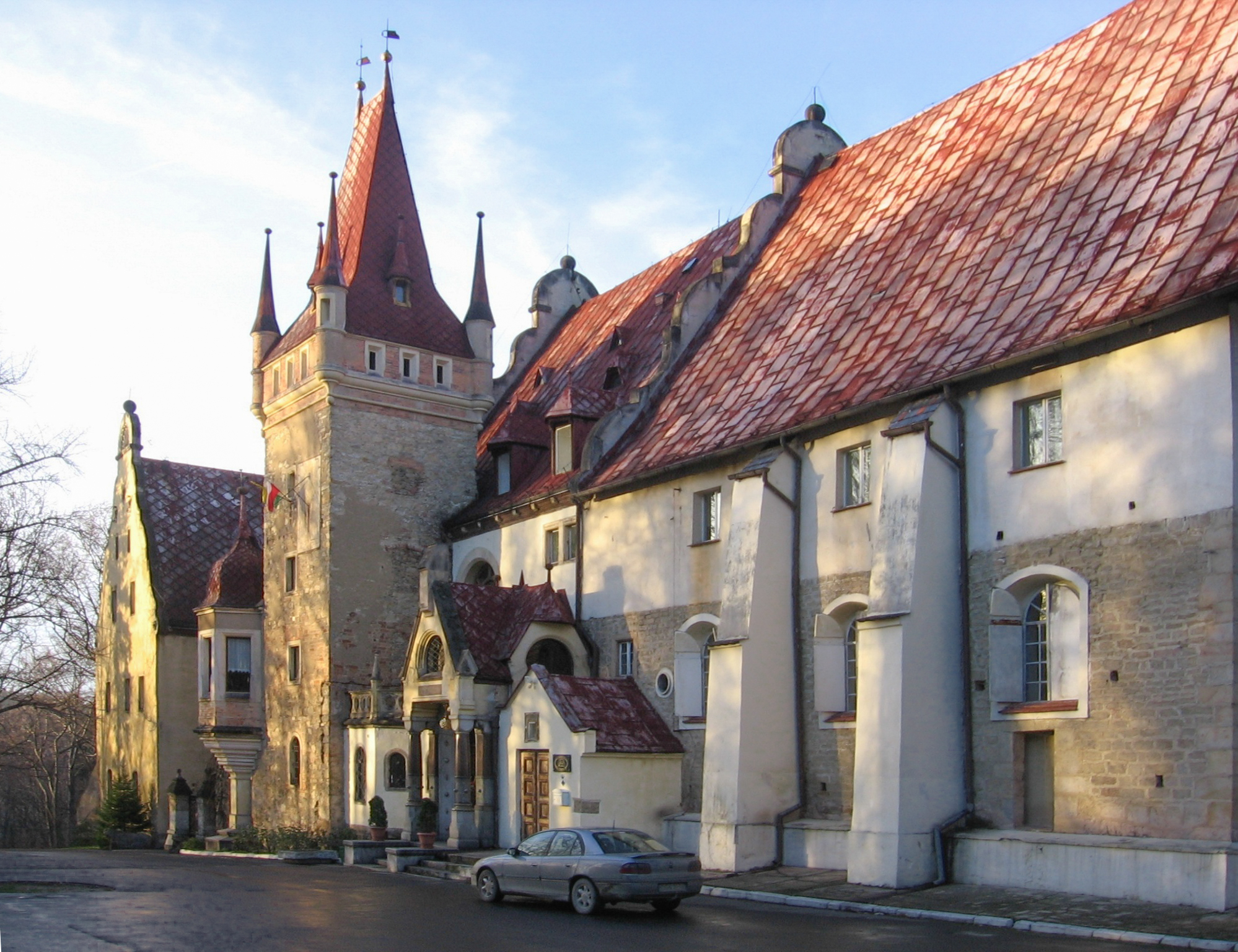
Sobótka-Górka Castle (Schloss Gorkau)

- Andrzej Szczytko as Feliks Krogulecki
- Jolanta Grusznic as Kornelia Biniewska - von Zwirner
- Zbigniew Bogdański as Beck
- Ryszard Dembiński as Nepomucen Wodniczak,
- Jerzy Kamas as Stefan Rowiński
- Leon Niemczyk as Jost
- Michał Pawlicki as professor Schaps
- Czesław Wołłejko as Wojciech Lipski,
- Bogusław Augustyn as Włodzimierz Lewandowski
- Jacek Guziński as Filip Krogulecki,
- Jan Jankowski as Florian Krogulecki,
- Bogdan Kochanowski as Wiktor Urbaniak
- Tomasz Mędrzak as Edward Wodniczak
- Krzysztof Milkowski as Oskar von Wedow
- Barbara Brylska as pani Wodniczakowa,
- Alicja Jachiewicz as Kazimiera Rowińska
- Bożena Miller-Małecka as Bogusia Wodniczakówna,
- Zdzisław Kozień as hrabia Szembek,
- Gustaw Kron as mecenas Lange-Wnukowski,
- Eugeniusz Kujawski as Kurzezunge
- Witold Skaruch as Ziegert
- Czesław Jaroszyński as Aleksander Dubiski,
- Stefan Paska as Mertka,
- Tomasz Zaliwski as Walerian Krogulecki
