= Kharkiv Ukrainian Drama Theatre =

Coordinates: 49.9950°N 36.2317°E

- Харківський академічний український драматичний театр імені Тараса Шевченка
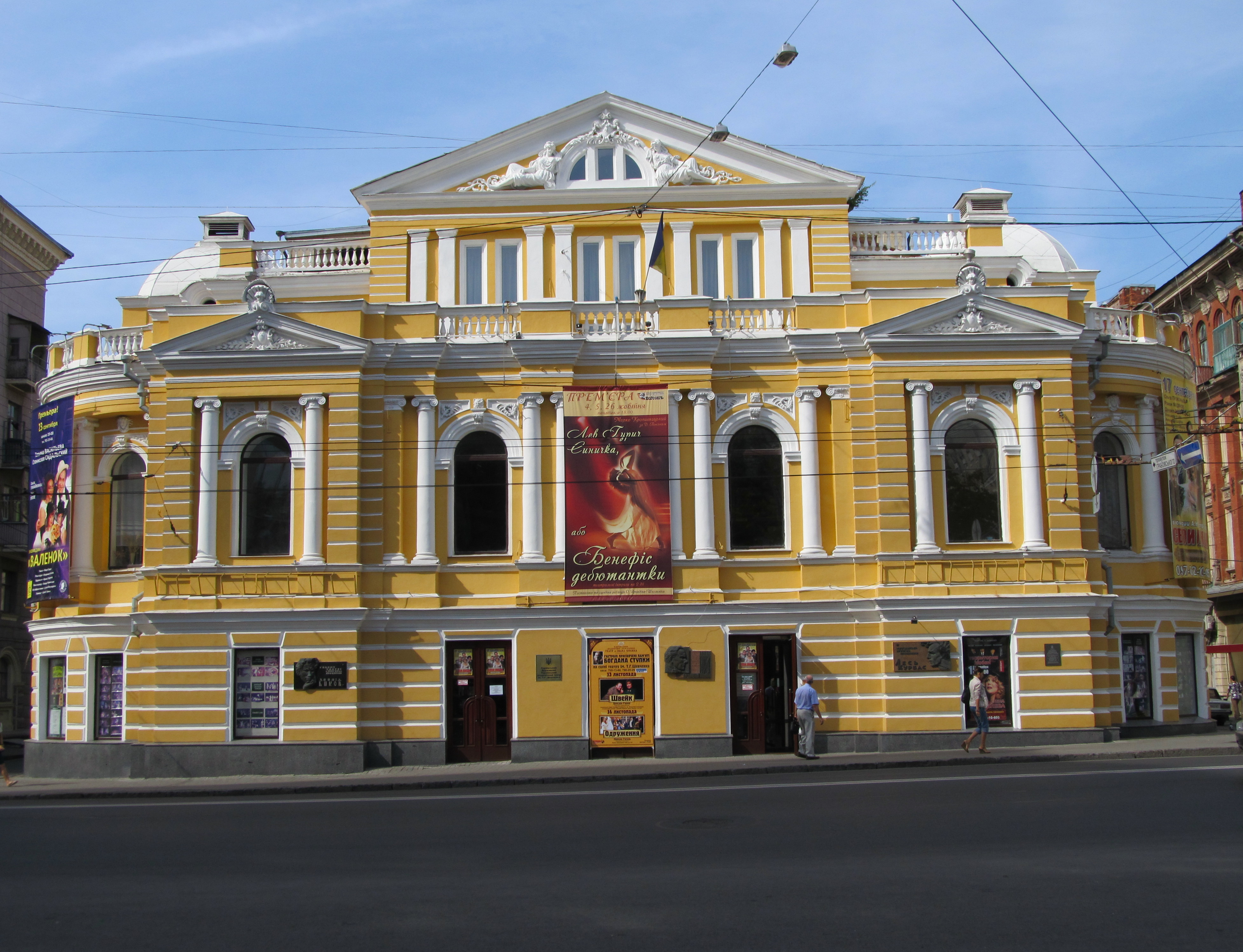
- Entrance to Kharkiv Drama Theatre
- Interactive map of Kharkiv Ukrainian Drama Theatre
- Address: 9 Sumska Street; Kharkiv; Ukraine
- Capacity: Main Stage: 900 Small Stage: 115
- Type: dramatic theatre

Construction
- Opened: 1922 / 1935

Website
- Theatre website

Immovable Monument of Local Significance of Ukraine
- Official name: «Театр ім. Шевченка» (Shevchenko Theatre)
- Type: Urban Planning, Architecture
- Reference no.: 7396-Ха

The Kharkiv Ukrainian Drama Theatre also known as the Taras Shevchenko Kharkiv Academic Ukrainian Drama Theatre (Ukrainian: Харківський академічний український драматичний театр імені Тараса Шевченка, romanized: Kharkivskyi akademichnyi ukrainskyi dramatychnyi teatr imeni Tarasa Shevchenka) is a national theatre founded in 1935 out of remnants of the suppressed Berezil Theatre, which was founded by Les Kurbas in 1922. Kharkiv Ukrainian Drama Theatre has two stages: Main Stage (900 seats) and Small Stage "Berezil" (115 seats).

The theater's repertoire was formed by directors trained in Konstantin Stanislavsky's school, and since 1990s by directors trained by Anatoly Vasiliev. Over the years the theater's ensemble included many renowned artists such as Vadym Meller (stage designer), Leonid Bykov (actor), Amvrosy Buchma (actor, star of the film Ivan the Terrible), Andriy Zholdak (theatre director), Andrzej Szczytko (theatre director).

From 2002 to 2005, Andriy Zholdak was the artistic director of the theatre, where he produced five plays, which, apart from Ukraine, were also presented in many European countries including Germany, France, Finland, Netherlands, Poland, Austria, Romania and Russia, at well known festivals. In 2005, after Kharkiv authorities prohibited his staging of Romeo and Juliet. A Fragment Zholdak was forced to leave the theatre.

In 2004, the theatre's ensemble was named by ITI - UNESCO critics as one of the best ensembles in Europe.

During the Russo-Ukrainian War, the theatre was forced to go underground.

== See also ==
- Yefrosyniya Zarnytska
