= Les Kurbas =

Ukrainian theatre director

- Лесь Курбас
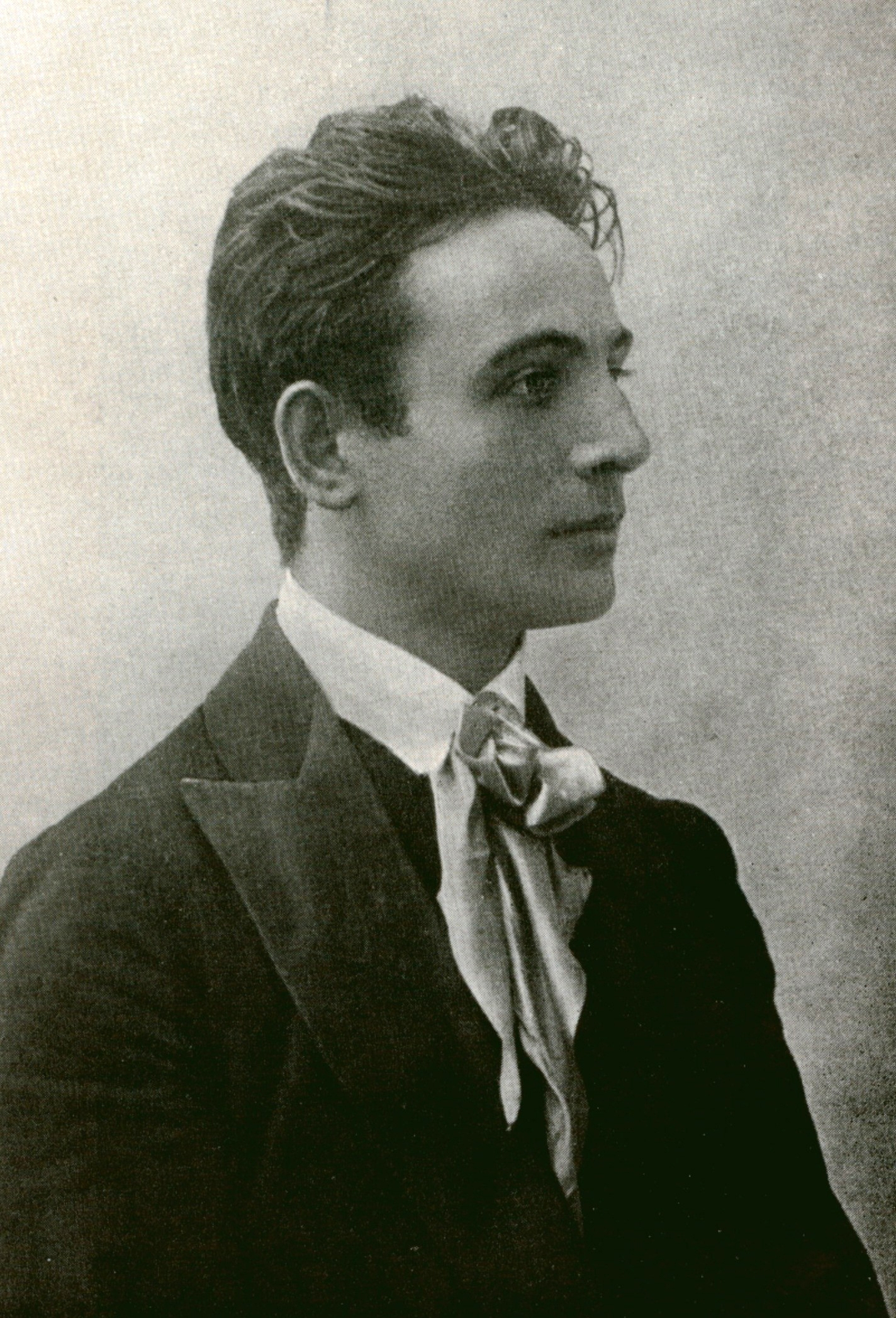
- Kurbas in c. 1908
- Born: Oleksandr-Zenon Kurbas; 25 February 1887; Sambir, Galicia, Austria-Hungary (now Ukraine)
- Died: 3 November 1937 (aged 50); Sandarmokh, Karelian ASSR, Russian SFSR Soviet Union (now Republic of Karelia, Russia)
- Education: University of Vienna; Lviv University
- Occupation: Theater director
- Writing career
- Period: 1915–1933
- Notable awards: People's Artist of Ukraine (1925)

Oleksandr-Zenon Stepanovych Kurbas (Ukrainian: Олександр-Зенон Степанович Курбас; 25 February 1887 – 3 November 1937) was a Ukrainian movie and theater director. He is considered by many to be the most important Ukrainian theater director of the 20th century. He formed, together with Vsevolod Meyerhold, Yevgeny Vakhtangov and several other directors, the Soviet theater avant-garde in the 1920s and 1930s. He is one of the most prominent representatives of Ukrainian avant-garde art. He is considered to be one of the lead figures of the Executed Renaissance. He was murdered by the Soviet regime, during Stalin's Great Terror.

== Early work ==
Kurbas was born in Sambir (then part of Austria-Hungary) on 25 February 1887, and was given a double name Oleksandr-Zenon, for short Les or Oles. His father, Stepan Pylypovych Kurbas (Yanovych) (1862–1908), was a Ruthenian actor who descended from Lithuanian lineage. His mother, Vanda Adolfivna (nata Kulczycka), born in Staryi Skalat, was also an actress, the daughter of an Austrian, Adolf Teichman. His parents' last name Yanovych was their pseudonym, for which they were better known, particularly in theater of "Ruska besida". Besides Les who was the first child there were three other children Kornylo (died 2 July 1895), Nestor, and Nadia, however none of them survived past their teenage years.

At first Kurbas studied at Ternopil gymnasium. In 1907, he enrolled in the Philosophy Department of the University of Vienna, from which he transferred in 1908 following his father's death, later enrolling at Lviv University (1908–1910). This was determined by the need to lead Ukrainian culture out of the provincialism it had fallen into as a result of the century-long occupation by Poland and Russia.

In the midst of the first world war Kurbas formed the "Ternopil theatrical evenings" (1915–1916) and the Molody Teatr (Young Theater) in Kyiv in 1916, which was the first ensemble to experiment with both new and ancient acting techniques. Kurbas directed and acted in plays such as Gogol's Revizor and, most importantly and to much acclaim, Sophocles' Oedipus Rex. Due to the shortage in resources and the general political chaos towards the end of the First World War the ensemble was disbanded. Along with it he was a professor at the Kyiv Music-Drama Institute in 1916–1919 and later Kharkiv Music-Drama Institute in 1926–1933. In 1920–21 Les Kurbas founded a Kyiv Drama Theater "Kiydramte".

Kurbas' next major project was Haydamaks (several stagings from 1920 on), a poem on the eighteenth-century Ukrainian upsurge against Polish occupation by Ukrainian poet laureate Taras Shevchenko. The production was the most important Ukrainian theater production of the twentieth century and went on to be staged even after Kurbas' death (without mention of his name, though). Kurbas integrated all the techniques of the Molody era, most notably in his treatment of the choir.

== Berezil Theater ==
It was only in 1922 that conditions in the now Soviet-ruled Ukraine were stable enough to allow Kurbas to found the "Berezil'" ("spring" or "new beginning") in Kyiv. In a same year Les Kurbas invited Vadym Meller to cooperation as a chief artist of the "Berezil'" Theater. Vadym Meller joined "Berezil'" with the experience of both easel artist and scenographer. The expressively unchained drawing, characteristic of V.Meller's early work, will become foundation, the origin in later stage productions done together with Les Kurbas. Since 1922 Les Kurbas also worked for the Odesa Film Studio where he directed such movies as "Shvedskaya spichka" (1922), "Arsenaltsy" (1925), and others. In 1925 Vadim Meller was awarded a gold medal for the scenic design of the "Berezil'" theatre (Exposition Internationale des Modernes, Paris ). "Berezil'" was not merely a theater, but a study and research institution which until today is nearly unequalled in its organisation. Every theater department has its own committees and workshops, and several branches were established in other Ukrainian cities. "Berezil'" attracted not only the best actors of its time: dozens of future Ukrainian actors and directors received their education here, going through a curriculum involving a whole series of acting techniques, rhythmic exercises, voice training and ensemble play. Kurbas aimed at a scientific grounding of every development in "Berezil'", which could sometimes lead to endless discussions in one of the committees. He wrote: "Today the comedy is over. The actor entered the stage, the only one by which the theater will live. Theater—tribune and spectacle, court and school, thought and folly of new man".

In its early years the theater suffered from a shortage of suitable plays that the productions could be based on. Kurbas was only one of several directors, if the most important one, and an outstanding organizer. His stagings of the time included "Gas" by the German author Georg Kaiser and "Jimmy Higgins" by Upton Sinclair. Kurbas made mostly use of the expressionistic techniques he had developed during the Molody era, but increased further the rhythmic organisation of the entire production.

In 1927 Kurbas met up-and-coming playwright Mykola Kulish in the Ukrainian capital of the time, Kharkiv, where the "Berezil'" had moved in 1926. Kulish's early plays had been staged by other theaters in the rigid Soviet realist manner that would become the standard all over the Soviet Union in the 1930s. The collaboration between Kulish and Kurbas proved to be both fortunate and unfortunate for the ensemble. While productions as The People's Malakhii (1928), Myna Mazailo (1929) and Maklena Grassa (1933) set new standards in ensemble play and dramatic rigor, they also fell foul with the official Soviet propaganda policy.

Yet Kurbas was determined to pursue his course in spite of the increasing threats. In 1930, just before the artificial famine in Ukraine, Kurbas was forced to stage Dyktatura ("Dictatorship"), by Ukrainian playwright Ivan Mykytenko. The propaganda play was an attempt to justify the Soviet policy that ultimately led to the starvation of the Ukrainian peasantry and caused several million deaths (the Holodomor). Kurbas turned the sense of the play around, a technique he named "recoding", and made a satirical and tragic opera out of a what had been a dull realist plot. While the authorities regarded the production as a final opportunity for Kurbas to give up his refractoriness and step back in line, Kurbas followed his own political instincts. By exposing the regime for what it was, he also dealt the death-blow to the theater and himself. Kurbas wrote: "We all know what dictatorship is, but few of us pay attention to it as to a fact of intellectual nature. The obligation of every actor of the play was to make every spectator understand that the rudder of history—is in his own hands."

The Taras Schevchenko Academic Ukrainian Drama Theatre in Kharkiv is an heir to Berezil's artistic traditions.

== Theatre theory and acting method ==
=== Origins ===
Kurbas began to develop his approach to acting at the Young Theatre in Kyiv (1917–1919). He taught the actors himself, and the company trained in the movement systems of François Delsarte and Émile Jaques-Dalcroze. The Internet Encyclopedia of Ukraine also lists the philosophy of Henri Bergson and the ideas of Max Reinhardt, Georg Fuchs and Edward Gordon Craig among his influences in these years. In his "Theatrical Letter" of October 1918 Kurbas denounced realism as hostile to art. Tkacz also quotes his statement that "the substance of theatre is not literature, but gesture and sound". He rejected acting driven by impulse and raw emotion. Instead, a role had to be "fixed": every choice the actor made had to be repeatable with precision.

Mayhill Fowler groups Kurbas with other cultural figures from the borderlands of the Russian Empire whose models were Reinhardt and the bodily expressiveness of German expressionist theatre before the First World War, rather than Stanislavski. Irena Makaryk notes that Kurbas knew Stanislavski's work only from press reports and did not see one of his productions until after 1923.

=== Transformation ===
At the center of Kurbas's theatre stood peretvorennia (перетворення, "transformation"). The term referred to a concrete image or gesture, conceived as a theatrical symbol, through which the inner and hidden side of reality became visible on stage. Eyewitnesses remembered an early example from his 1919–1920 production of Macbeth: in act I, scene vii Macbeth spoke his soliloquy to Duncan's crown, which hung from the throne, and the gesture gave the audience a visible image of his thoughts. The same production was among the first in which Kurbas tested his principles of "fixity, clarity, economy, rhythmicalness". In a 1925 article Kurbas described transformation as the core of the "left theatre" of recent years, a formula for theatrical means that reveals the depicted reality in its essence. For Virlana Tkacz, a transformed gesture used contradiction to bring out both the psychological and the social side of a character.

The theatre historian Nelli Kornienko distinguishes Kurbas both from Stanislavski, for whom transformation meant psychological approximation, and from Meyerhold with his biomechanics; Kurbas, she writes, was after a new kind of acting "in the stream of life, in the stream of energy, with rhythm as a foundation". On stage, Berezil sought to bring the spoken word, the actors' bodies, music, lighting and stage design together under one rhythm. Citing the actor and director Roman Cherkashyn, Makaryk adds that neither Russian nor any other language has an equivalent for Kurbas's term.

=== The actor ===
In 1924 Kurbas wrote: "The actor today does not identify with the role; he objectivizes it." His definition of acting had two parts: "duration in an assigned plane and rhythm", and the ability to find symbols for what is being represented, both in the actor's own body and in the other materials of the theatre. The ideal performer was a "wise harlequin". According to Béatrice Picon-Vallin, Kurbas preferred an intellectual actor to an "emoting" one, and since he regarded the body as the actor's "most valuable instrument", his company trained hard in acrobatics, dance and rhythm.

=== Training ===
Students started with mimodramas, short mimed études on everyday tasks performed without real objects, such as ironing trousers, fetching water, lighting a stove or drinking a glass of tea. Once fixed, an étude had to be performed the same way every time; Makaryk calls this ability the hallmark of the masterly actor for Kurbas. Gesture came first, then gesture with props. Only at the last stage were students allowed to work with spoken text. Assignments also included conveying, through the body alone, what was essential in a painting by Rembrandt or van Gogh or a piece by Beethoven or Scriabin.

The curriculum also included philosophy, gymnastics, acrobatics, plastic movement, rhythmics, fencing, juggling and improvisation. Voice work was led by the singer Yosyf Kunin, whose system had actors "send the voice" into seven "centres" of the body. Kurbas sometimes rehearsed with a metronome. Berezil had a "psycho-technical" committee for applied psychology, and its actors studied medicine, biology and psychology. One of them, Oleksandr Zaporozhets, later became a psychologist of Lev Vygotsky's school.

Romana Bahrij Pikulyk, drawing on a 1954 essay by the Berezil actor Yosyp Hirniak, writes that Kurbas told his actors "to suppress their inner feelings, to conquer their material". Cherkashyn, quoted by Makaryk, remembered it differently: the technique "in no way limited the emotional range of the actors", who were expected to fill the fixed form with live emotion.

=== Comparisons ===
Picon-Vallin calls the extent of Meyerhold's influence on Kurbas "debatable". She finds Kurbas's insistence on the intellectual actor strikingly close to Meyerhold's thinking, yet stresses that Kurbas, an independent artist, neither asked Meyerhold for help nor presented himself as his follower. Makaryk writes that Kurbas used "estrangement" techniques almost ten years before Brecht, but she separates his ochudnennia (очуднення), in which spiritual and joyous functions came first, from Brecht's alienation, which rests on distance.

=== Pupils ===
According to the theatre historian Natalia Kuziakina, the director Hnat Ihnatovych left Berezil in the mid-1920s and went on to teach the "Kurbas system" in Kyiv and Kharkiv. Leontii Dubovyk, one of the young directors Kurbas had recruited to the Berezil laboratory, lectured on directing at the Kharkiv Theatre Institute after the Second World War.

== Imprisonment and execution ==
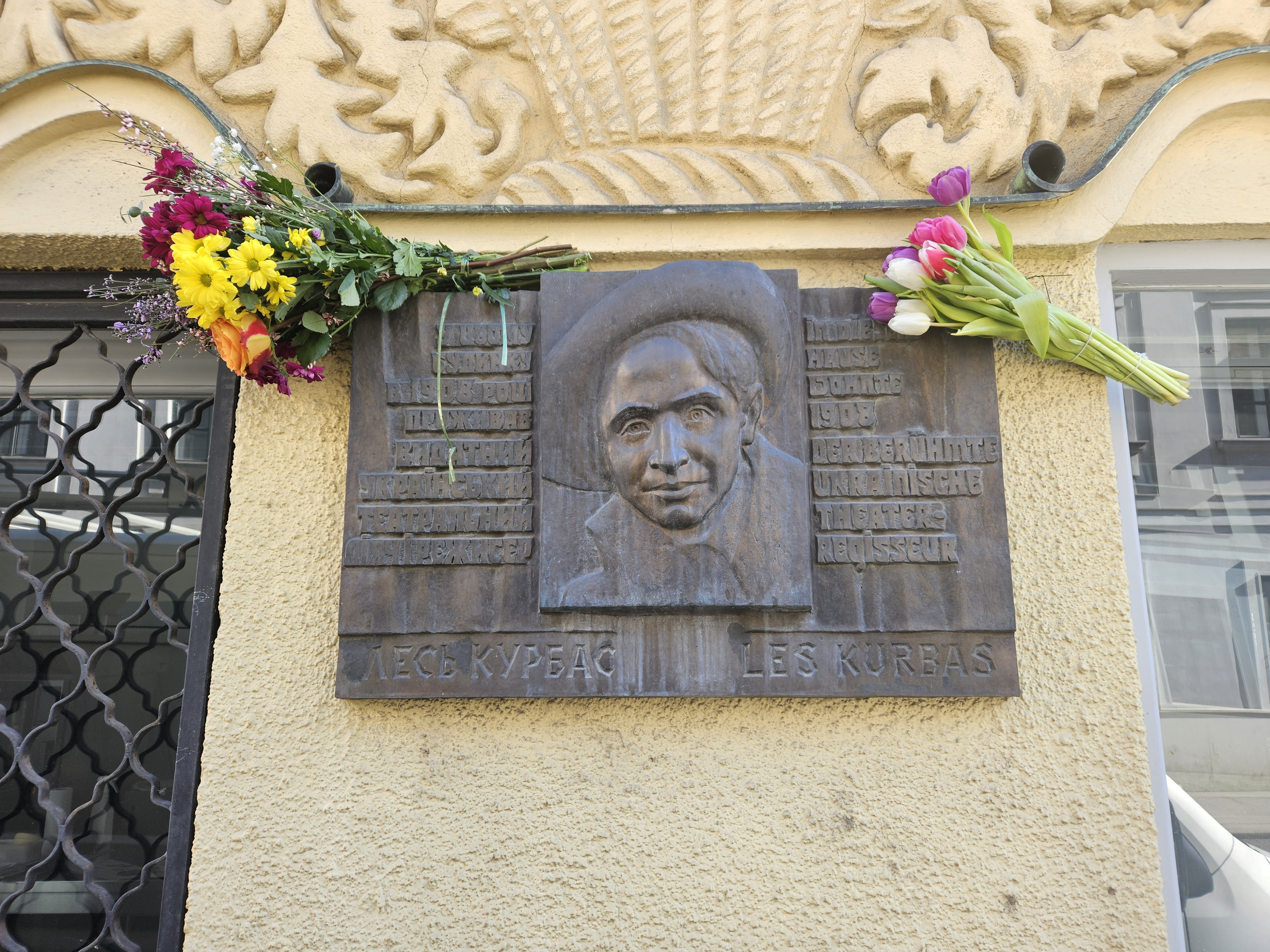
Memorial plaque to Kurbas in Vienna, Austria is adorned by flowers for his birth anniversary, March 2026

In 1933, Kurbas was ousted from "Berezil". He was allowed to go to Moscow, where he probably was the major force behind Solomon Mikhoels' famous staging of King Lear (1934). Later, in 1933, he was arrested and put into a labour camp (as were many other cultural figures). Even under these conditions Les Kurbas showed his unshakable love for the theater. As his friend and competitor Vsevolod Meyerhold would do later during his own imprisonment, Kurbas organized a camp theater and was even in touch with the author of one of the plays he staged to discuss dramaturgical decisions.

Kurbas was then moved to the remote Solovetsky Islands in the White Sea, and was one of the "lost transport" of prisoners shipped back to the mainland in 1937 from Solovki. It is now known that he was shot on 3 November 1937 with 289 other members of the Ukrainian intelligentsia at the killing field and burial ground of Sandarmokh near Medvezhyegorsk, in Karelia (northwest Russia), a site discovered in 1997 by members of the Memorial Society.

Joseph Stalin had directly ordered the killing of over one thousand artists and intellectuals held in the Solovki prison camp. Kurbas' friend Mykola Kulish met the same fate.

After Stalin's death, Kurbas was rehabilitated in 1957.

== Posterity ==
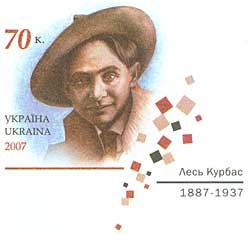
Ukraine stamp of 2007 picturing Les Kurbas

The "Berezil'" Theater lived on under the name of "Shevchenko Theater". One of Kurbas' lead actors, Marjan Kurshelnytsky, led it until the 1960s, but had to make many artistic compromises. Kurbas' work could only be mentioned again from the 1960s onwards, yet the overdue research was only begun in late 1980s, mostly in Ukraine. There is a tendency in the Ukrainian research to glorify Kurbas. Some hagiographers claim that Kurbas was a genius (he was indeed multi-talented) who anticipated every development of the later 20th century theater (some of which he did, as for example in the work of Italian director Eugenio Barba's Odin Teatret). Another important falsification is that Kurbas was not a communist. It would be more correct to say that he had an entirely different vision of communism and the potential of a new society for the development of human creativity. His most important goal as an artist was to "make the audience feel more alive".

== Theatre award ==
The Les Kurbas Prize is a theatre award of Ukraine that is named after the famous director.

== See also ==
- Kateryna Rubchakova
