= Berezil Theatre =

Avant-garde theatre troupe in Ukrainian SSR (1922–33)

- Театр «Березіль»
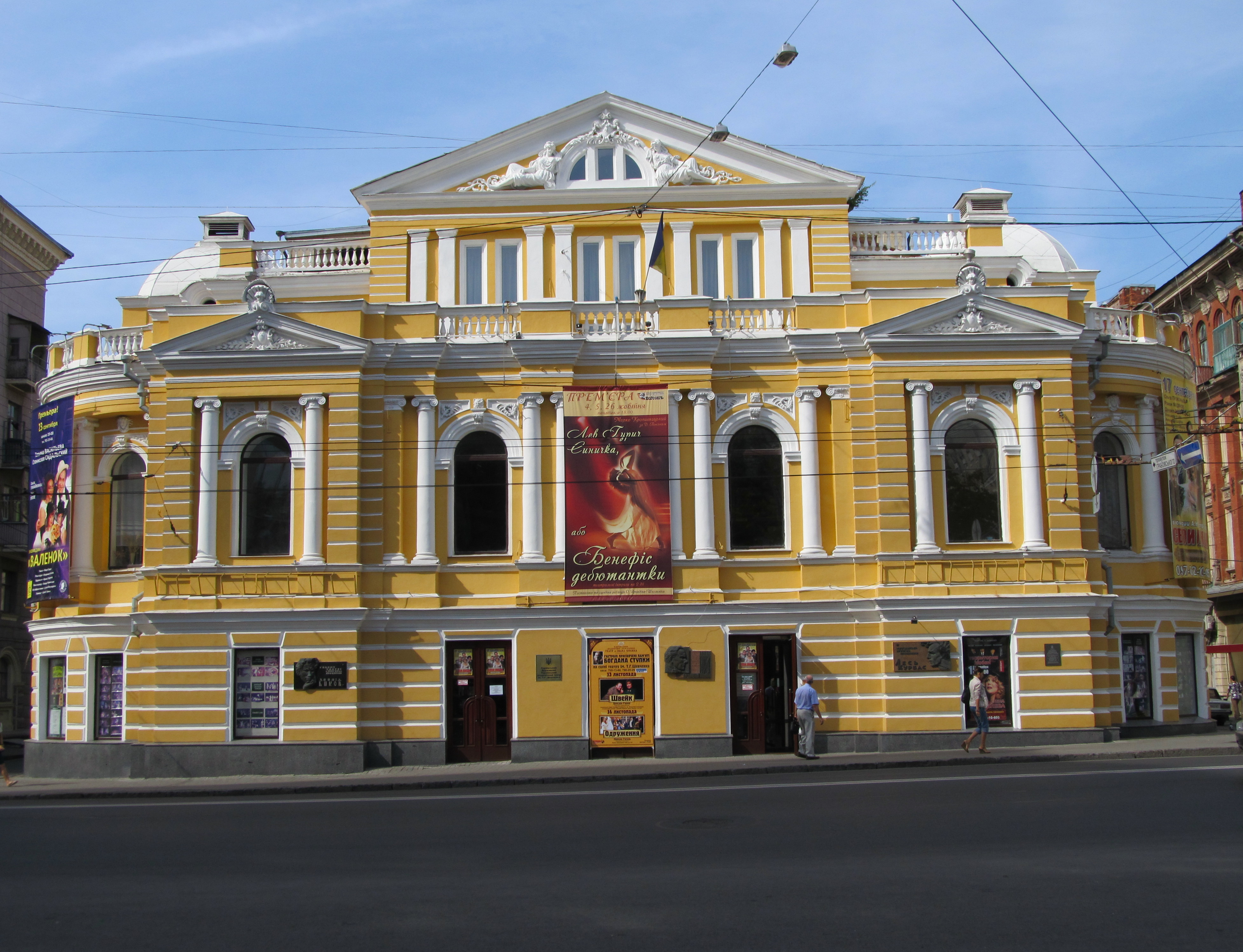
- The Berezil Theatre (1922–33)
- Interactive map of Berezil Theatre
- Address: 9 Sumska Street; Kharkiv; Ukraine
- Coordinates: 50.0006°N 36.2312°E
- Capacity: Main Stage: 900; Berezil Small Stage: 115
- Type: Avant-garde
- Current use: Kharkiv Ukrainian Drama Theatre

Construction
- Opened: 1922
- Closed: 1933

Website
- Theatre website
- 🇺🇦 | State Register of Immovable Monuments of Ukraine

Immovable Monument of Local Significance of Ukraine

The Berezil Theatre (Uk: Театр «Березіль») (1922–1933) was "the largest state-funded theatre in Soviet Ukraine." Founded by Les Kurbas, who was considered the greatest theater director of the 20th century, the avant-garde theatre troupe was named for March (Uk: березень, pronounced berezen), the first month of spring in Ukrainian and a period identified with renewal, an approach Kurbas "intertwined with Impressionism, Symbolism, and the experimental." "The overarching goal of Berezil's productions," he said, "was the synthesis of speech, movement, gesture, music, light, and decorative art into one rhythm or simple, dramatic language, based on the belief that theatre shapes rather than reflects life." In 1920, he summarized a successful performance by saying: "There were those who cried for us. There were those who thought that only our performances made them conscious Ukrainians."

Originally based in Kyiv, the troupe relocated to Kharkiv in 1926. Also known as Artistic Organization Berezil’ (BAA),

[a]t its height, Berezil included six actors' studios (three in Kyiv, one each in Bila Tserkva, Boryspil, and Odesa), close to 400 actors and staff members, a directors' lab, a design studio, a theater museum, and ten committees, including a ‘psycho-technical’ committee that used applied psychology to develop new teaching methods for actors and directors. The BAA organised the publication of the Barricades of Theatre (Uk: Barykady teatru) magazine and the Museum Commission, which collects documents on the history of Ukrainian theatre and creates a museum — known today as the Museum of Theatre, Music and Cinema of Ukraine.

In 1925, Vadym Meller was awarded a gold medal by the International Exhibition of Modern Decorative and Industrial Arts (Art Deco) in Paris for his scenic design at the Berezil. In 1927, Kurbas and the Berezil began collaborating closely with Ukrainian playwright Mykola Kulish. After the production of Kulish's last play, Maklena Grasa, Kurbas was sent into exile by the Commissariat of Enlightenment.

The theatre is now used by The Kharkiv Ukrainian Drama Theatre, which is also known as the Taras Shevchenko Kharkiv Academic Ukrainian Drama Theatre (Uk: Харківський академічний український драматичний театр імені Тараса Шевченка), a national theatre with two stages: the largest has 900 seats, the other, known as the "Berezil Small Stage," has 115 seats. Its collection, known as the Berezil museum collection, is now housed in the Kyiv-Pechersk Lavra (Building 24).

== Actor training ==
Berezil set up a directors' laboratory on 4 March 1923. From 4 March 1925 it worked as the directors' staff (Rezhshtab), which was divided into seven sections, or "stations". Among them were stations for recording and systematizing experience, for stage language and terminology, and for the scientific organization of work. Training moved from rhythm exercises and mimodramas to work with props, and students reached the spoken word only at the end. When experienced actors joined the Fourth Studio, they were retrained along the lines of the First Studio programme. Kurbas also introduced a similar course at the Theatre Institute and directed it himself. One student recalled that Valentyna Chystiakova taught movement and plastique there, Favst Lopatynskyi movement and gymnastics, and Hnat Ihnatovych acting.

== Select productions ==
- Haz (Gas), 1922, written by Georg Kaiser
- Macbeth, 1924, written by William Shakespeare
- Dance of numbers, 1927, directed by Les Kurbas, set design by Vadym Meller
- Narodnyi Malakhii (The People’s Malakhii), 1927, written by Mykola Kulish
- Sonata Pathétique, written by Mykola Kulish
- Maklena Grasa, 1933, written by Mykola Kulish

== Gallery ==
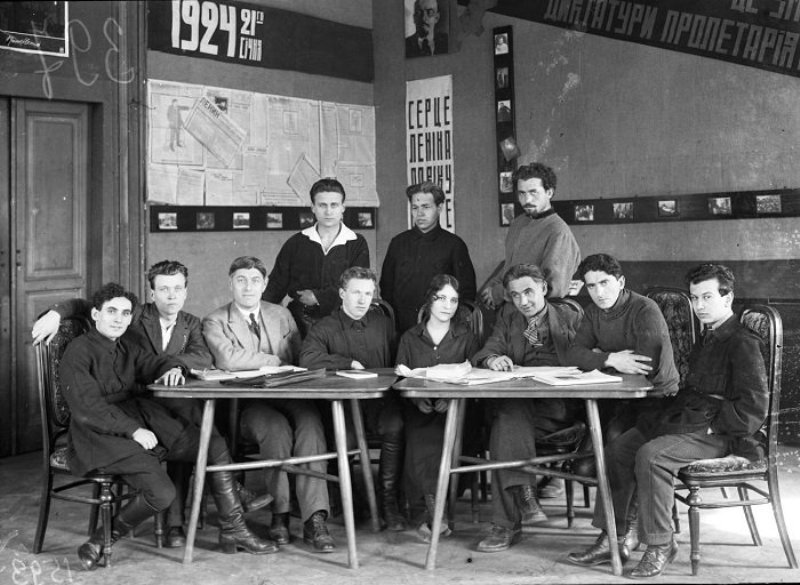
Directing staff of the Berezil Art Association, 1925.

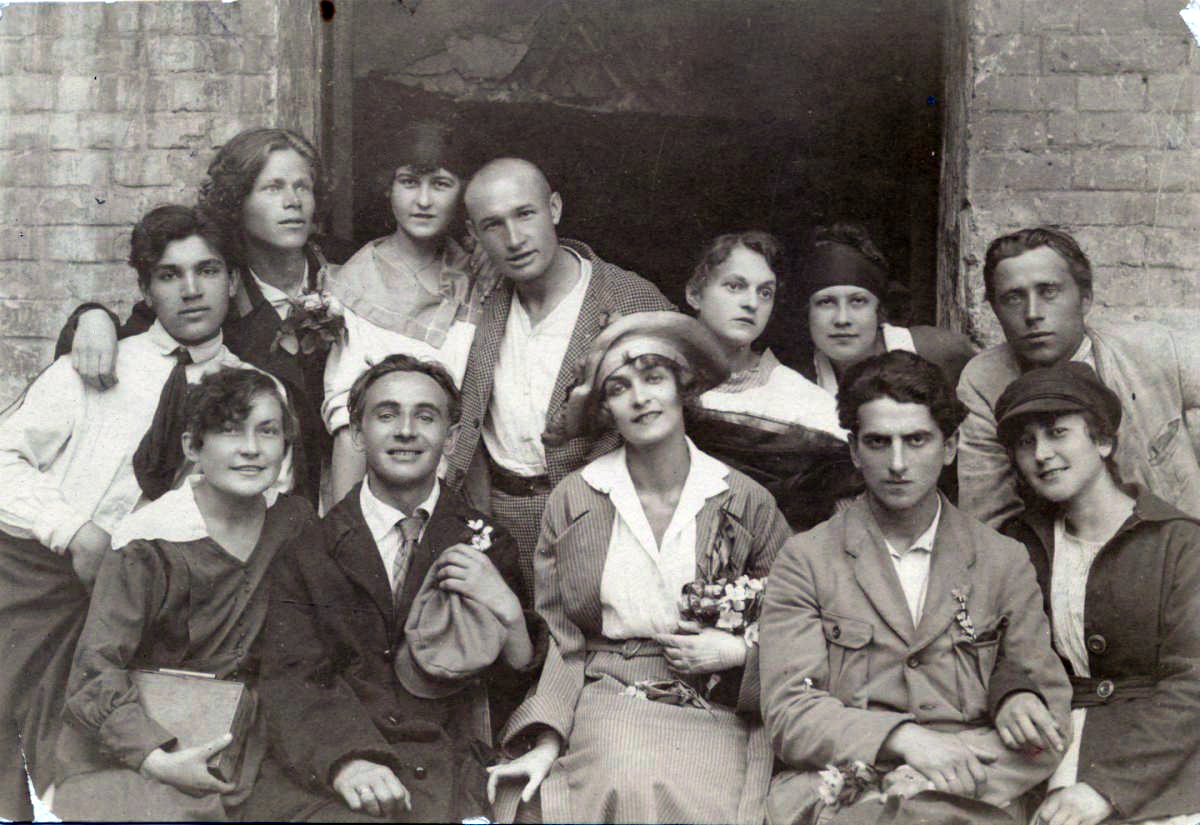
Students in front of the Berezil Theatre, 1922.

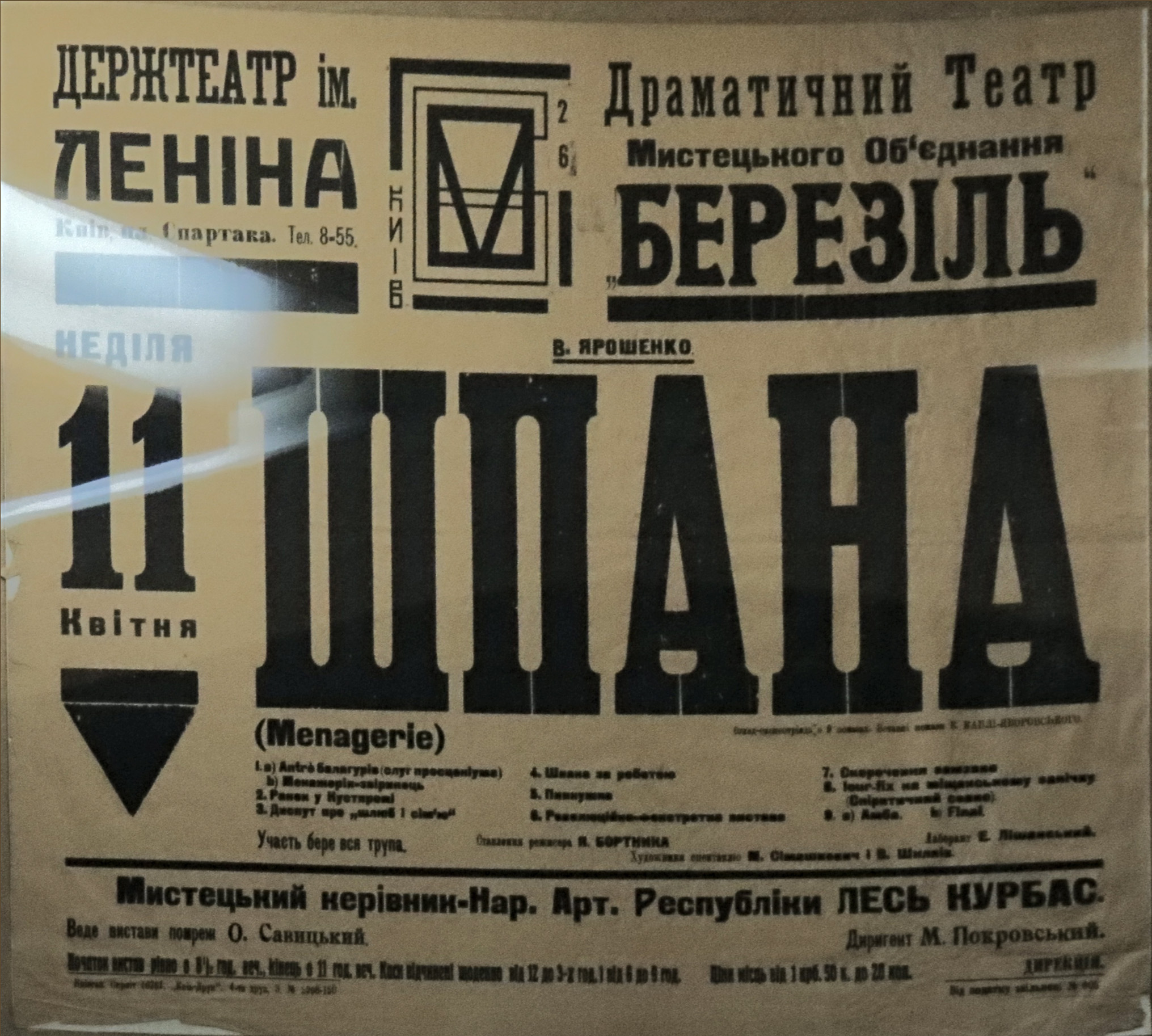
Berezil Poster, 1926.

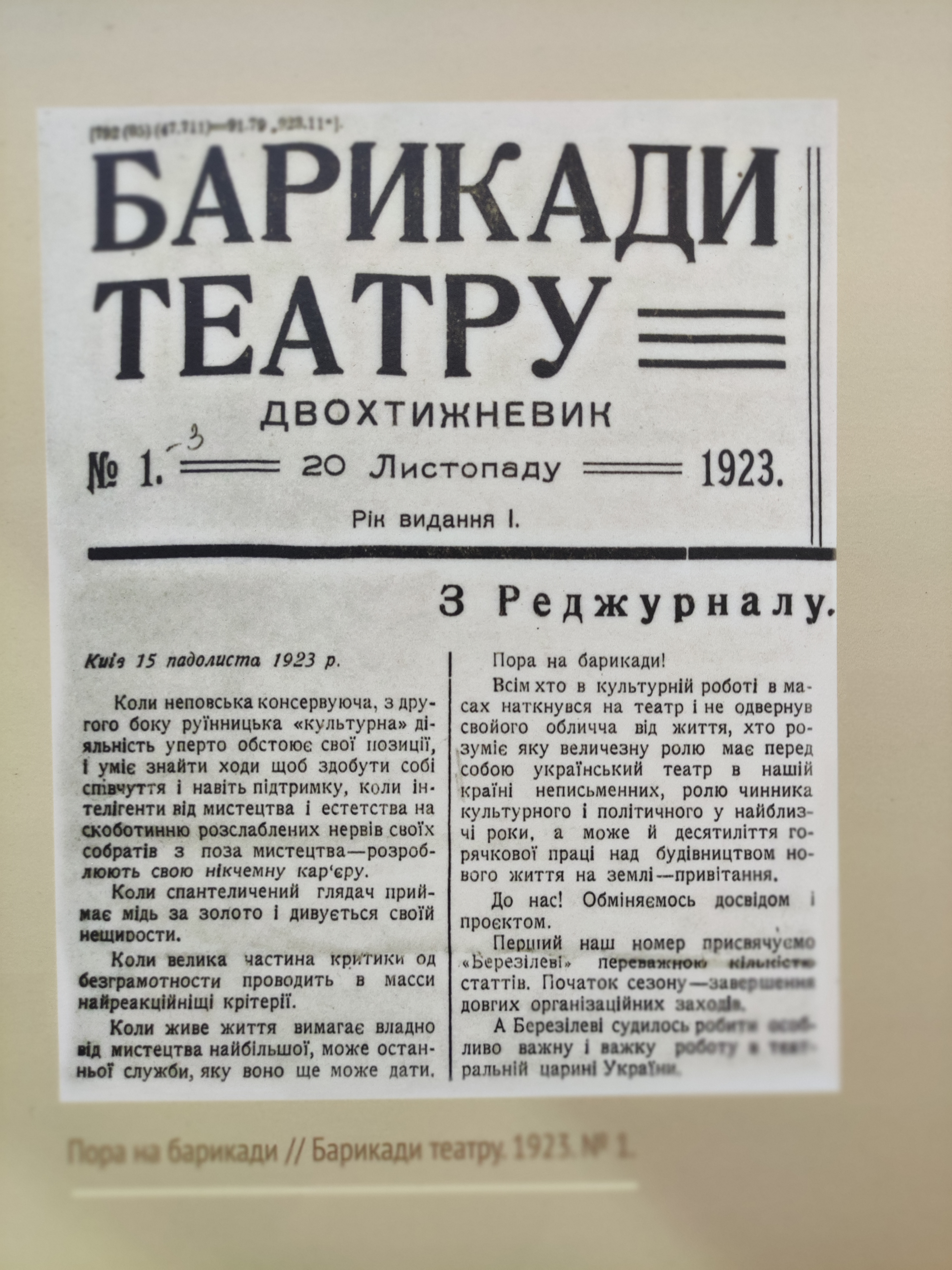
From: Barricades of the Theatre weekly. Fragment of the exhibition "Names Crossed Out of Posters" at the Bykivnia Memorial, August 2021.

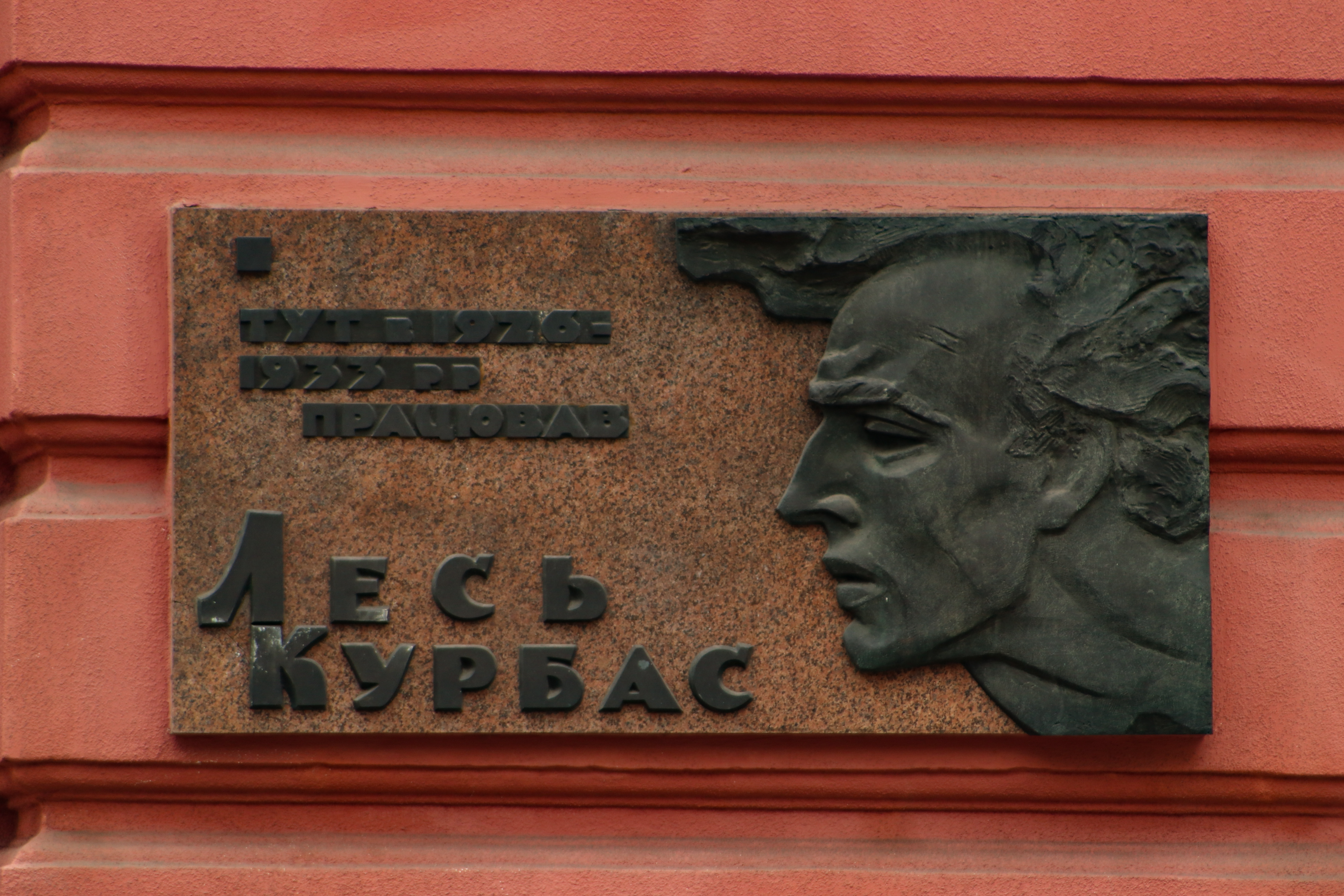
Wall plaque commemorating Berezil Theatre founding director Les Korbas.

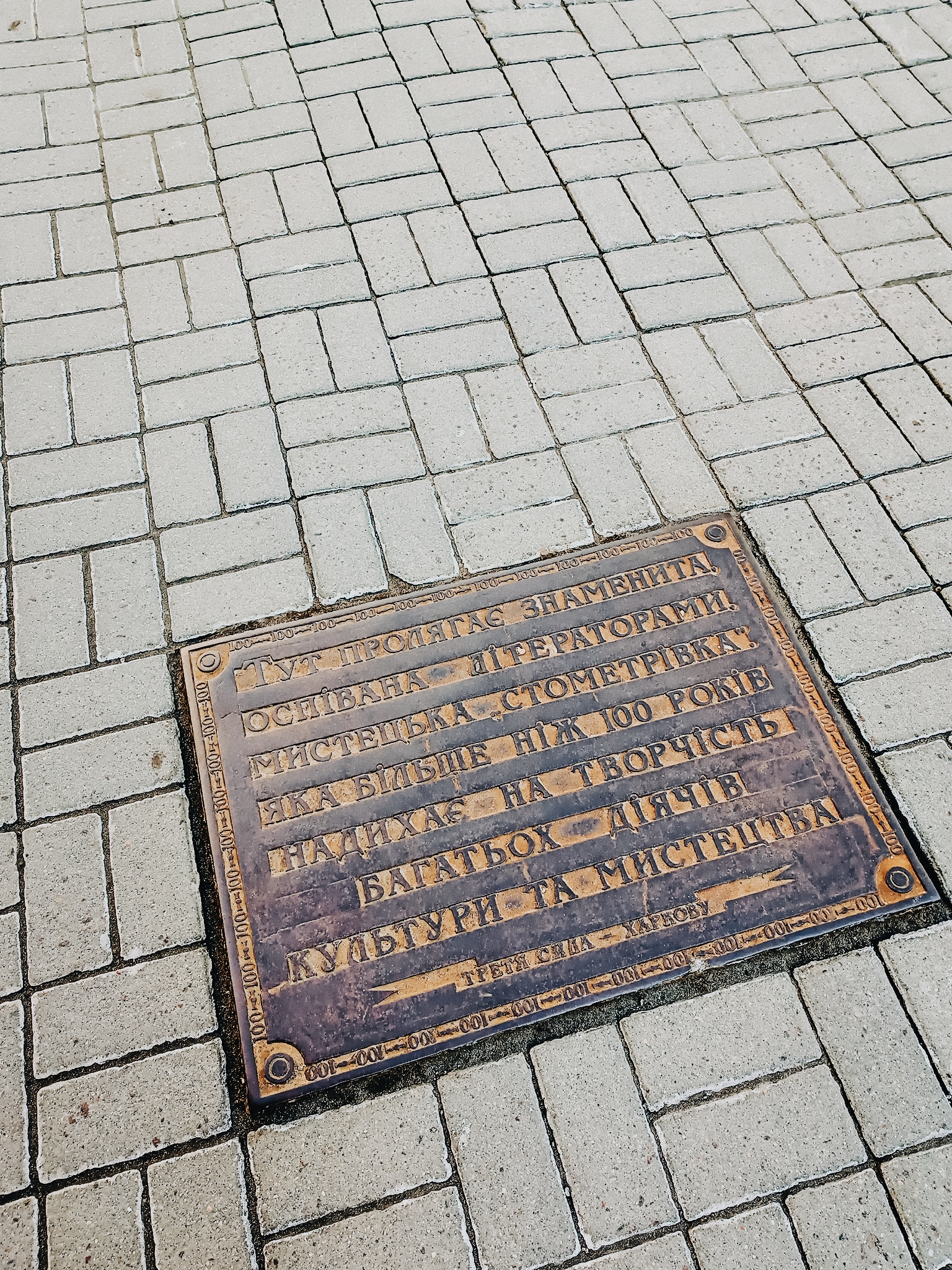
Floor plaque commemorating the Berezil Theatre.

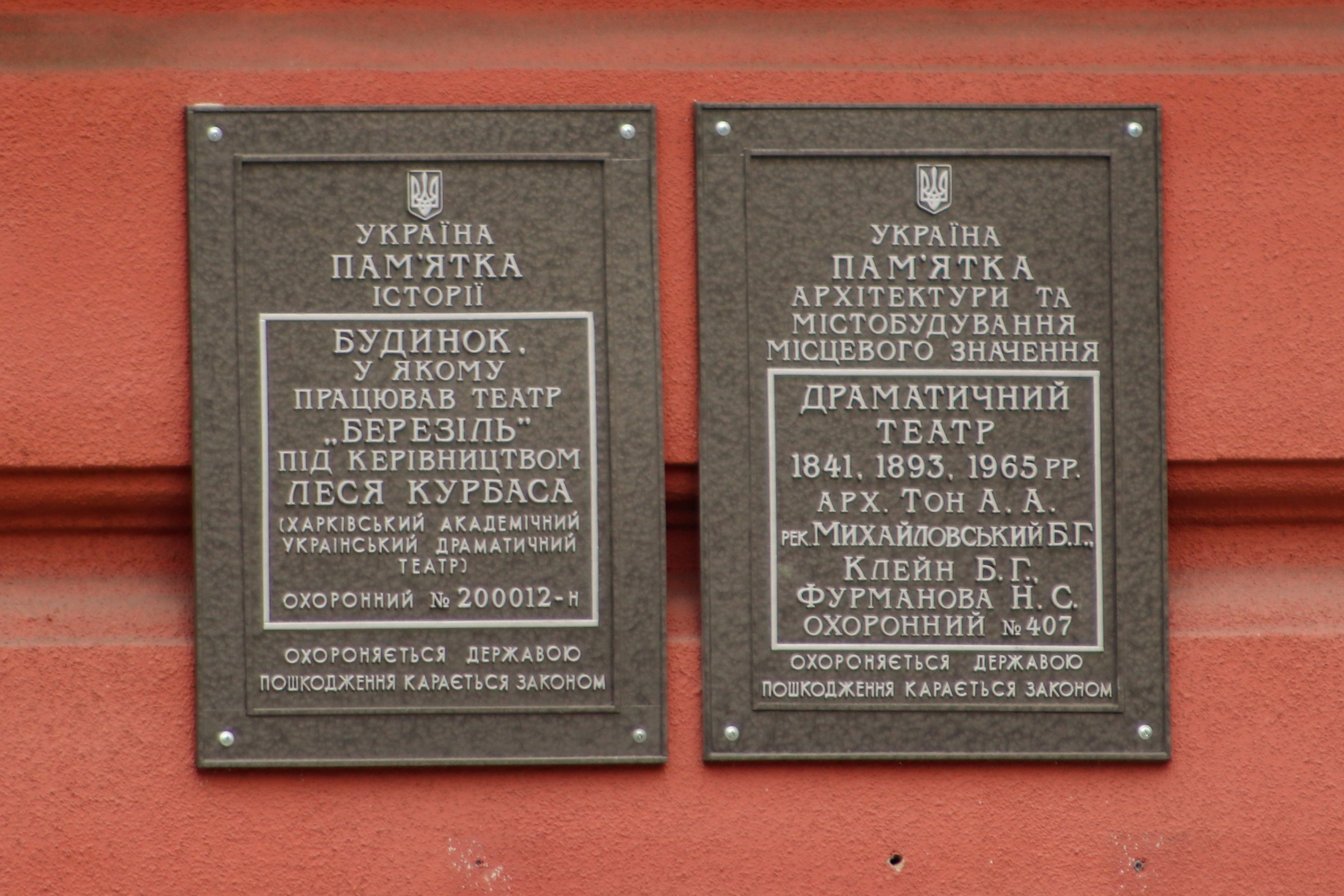
Wall plaques commemorating the Berezil Theatre.

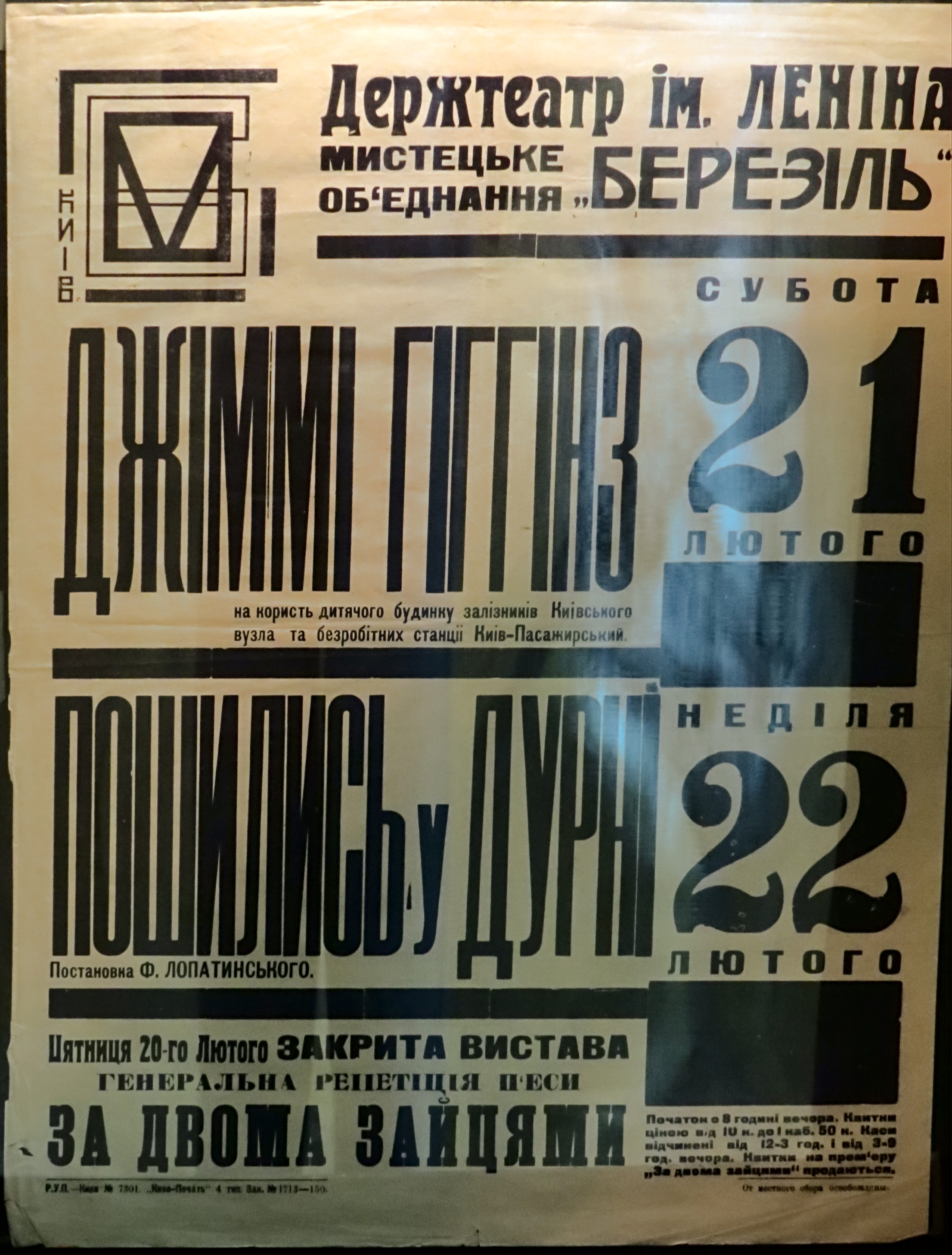
Berezil Poster, 1924.

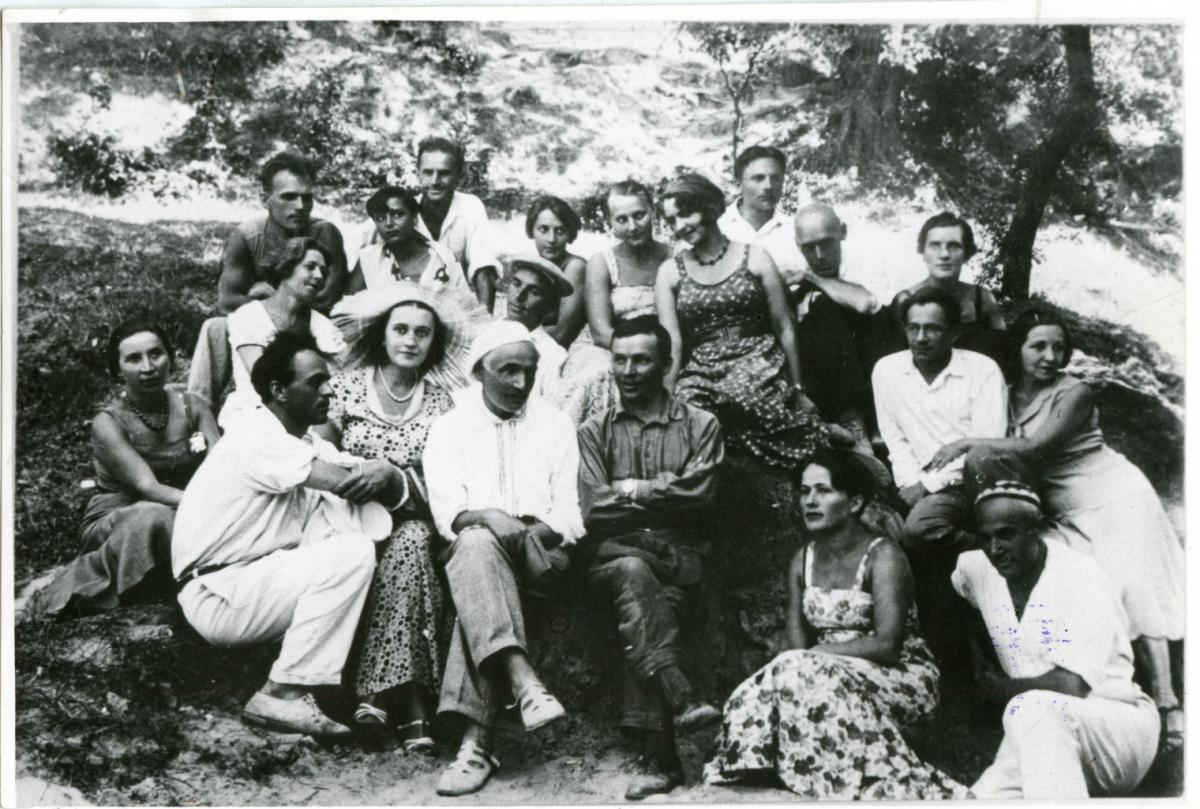
Actors preparing for the play Maklena Grassa at the Berezil Theater, 1933.

== Links ==
- Executed Renaissance
- Les Kurbas
