= Polish Theatre (Szczecin) =

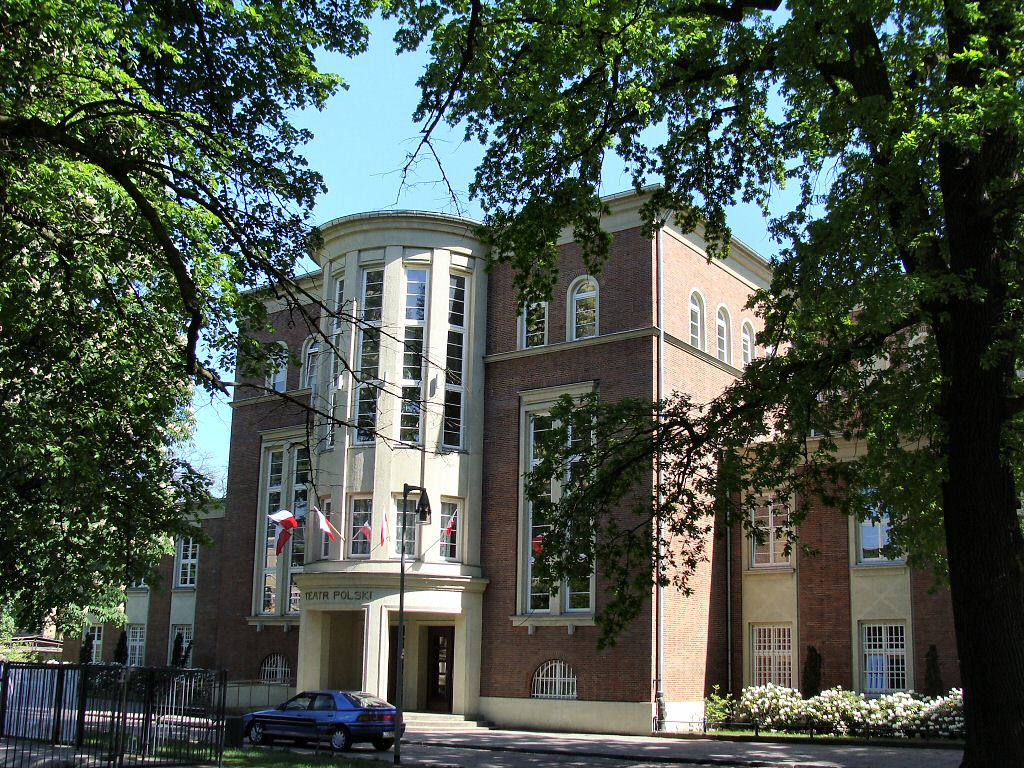
Entrance to the Polish Theatre in Szczecin (2009).

The Polish Theatre in Szczecin (Polish: Teatr Polski w Szczecinie) is a repertory theatre in Szczecin (Poland), established in 1946 in the building of a former masonic lodge.
