= Polish Theatre, Poznań =

Theater in Poznań, Poland

Coordinates: 52.4086°N 16.9237°E

Polish Theatre in Poznań
- Teatr Polski w Poznaniu
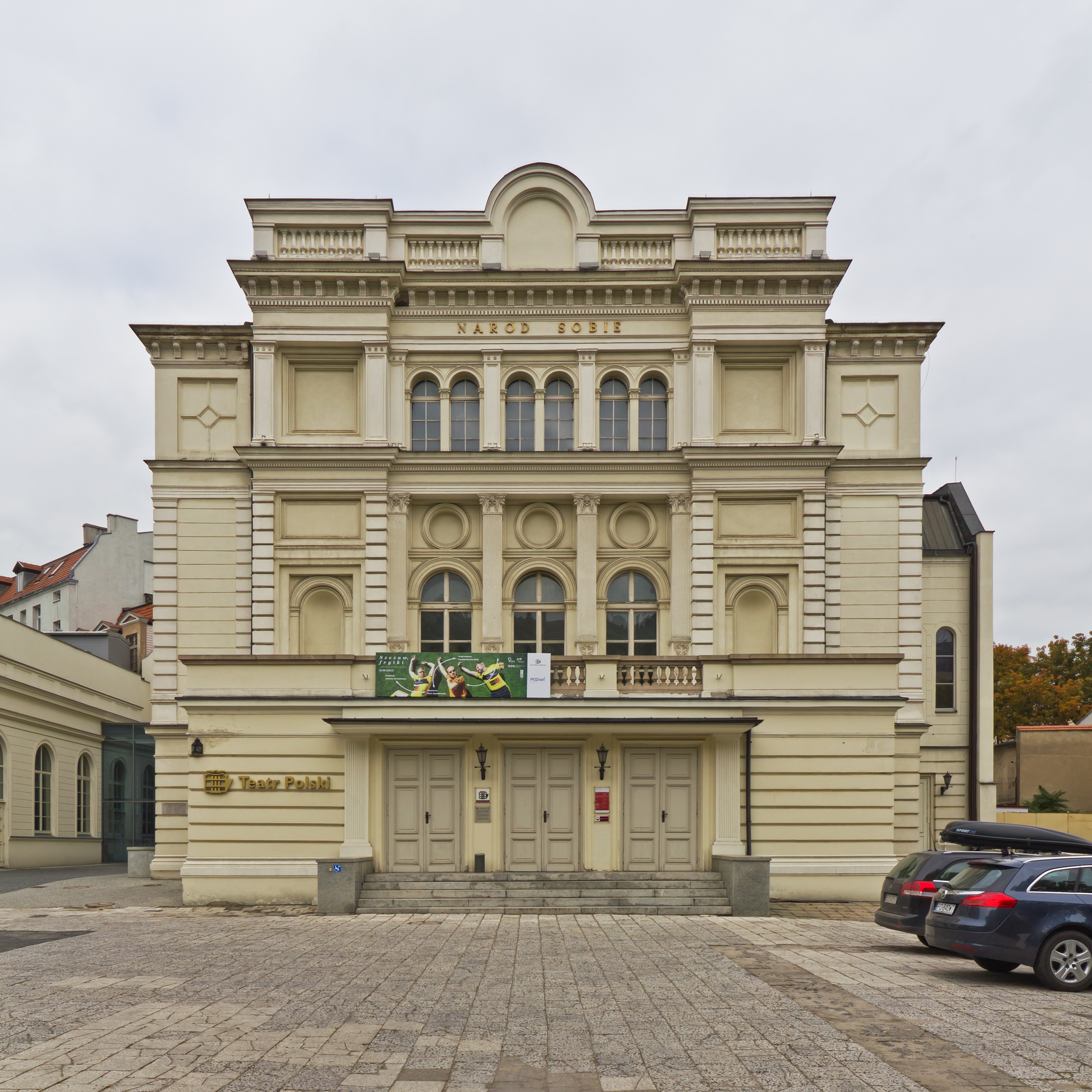
- Entrance to Polish Theatre
- Interactive map of Polish Theatre in Poznań
- Address: 27 Grudnia St. 8/10; Poznań; Poland
- Type: dramatic theatre

Construction
- Opened: 1875
- Architect: Stanisław Hebanowski

Website
- Theatre website

The Polish Theatre in Poznań (Polish: Teatr Polski w Poznaniu lub Teatr Polski w ogrodzie Potockiego w Poznaniu) is a Polish repertory theatre founded in 1875. Is one of the oldest and best-known theatres in Poland.

== History ==
This Poznań stage was created on the initiative of the citizens of Poznań and the theatre's façade was adorned with the inscription "The Nation Unto Itself" (Polish: Naród sobie). For the inhabitants of the Greater Poland region, the Polish Theatre became a national stage, acting as a mainstay of polish tradition and culture, and as a sign of resistance against the restrictive policies of the Prussian partition authorities.

The membership of the theatrical troupe is traditionally divided into tenured members of the ensemble and guest actors. The former are regular members of the troupe, while the latter are paid actors who may, after a certain length of service, become tenured members. The names of nearly all the great actors and dramatists in history of Polish Theatre have, at some time in their career, been associated with that of the Poznań's Polish Theater.

The Polish Theatre in Poznań has four stages: Main Stage (300 seats), Malarnia Stage (100 seats), Gallery Stage (40 seats) and Stage "Basement under the Stage".
