= Mińsk Mazowiecki Ghetto =

Nazi ghetto in occupied Poland

Coordinates: 52.1792°N 21.5721°E

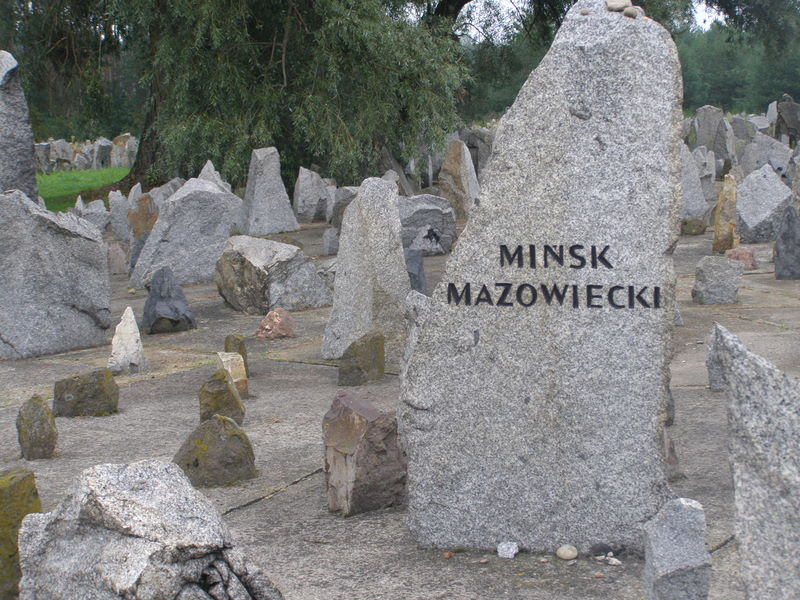
- Commemorative stone to ghetto victims at the Treblinka extermination camp museum

- Mińsk location south of Treblinka in World War II
- Also known as: Mińsk Ghetto
- Location: Mińsk Mazowiecki, German-occupied Poland
- Date: 25 Oct 1940 – 21 Aug 1942
- Incident type: Imprisonment, starvation, mass shooting
- Organizations: Nazi SS
- Victims: 7,000 Polish Jews
- Survivors: 250
- Memorials: The Jewish cemetery in Mińsk

The Mińsk Mazowiecki Ghetto or the Mińsk Ghetto (Polish: Getto w Mińsku Mazowieckim, Yiddish: נאוואמינסק, Novominsk) was a World War II ghetto set up by Nazi Germany in occupied Poland. Some 7,000 Polish Jews were imprisoned there from all neighbouring settlements for the purpose of persecution and exploitation. Two years later, beginning 21 August 1942 during the most deadly phase of the Holocaust in occupied Poland, they were rounded up – men, women and children – and deported to Treblinka extermination camp aboard Holocaust trains. In the process of Ghetto liquidation, some 1,300 Jews were summarily executed by the SS in the streets of Mińsk Mazowiecki.

== History ==
Following the September 1939 Nazi-Soviet invasion of Poland, on 25 October 1940 a ghetto was created in Mińsk 41 kilometres (25 mi) east of Warsaw, around the heavily shelled town square, and along the streets of Siennicka, Nadrzeczna, Mostowa and Warszawska. Some 5,000 Jews were forced to relocate there from all over the city, which was followed by the ghetto expansion with more dispossessed Jews brought in from Kałuszyn, Kalisz, Lipno, and Pabianice. Those confined within the boundaries of the ghetto were allowed starvation rations by the SS for unreasonable amounts of money. Whenever possible, they received help from the non-Jewish Poles on the outside who smuggled food, and passed around kennkartes forged by the underground. Such activity presented a grave danger due to the presence of the German minority in Mińsk serving with the local Sonderdienst battalion (the gun-wielding Sonderdienst were formed by Gauleiter Frank on 6 May 1940). Among the Polish Righteous were Helena and Julian Grobelny, President of Żegota, who harbored over a dozen Jewish activists in their home nearby. There were also Christian Poles executed by the SS under the charge of aiding Jews.

=== Ghetto resistance ===
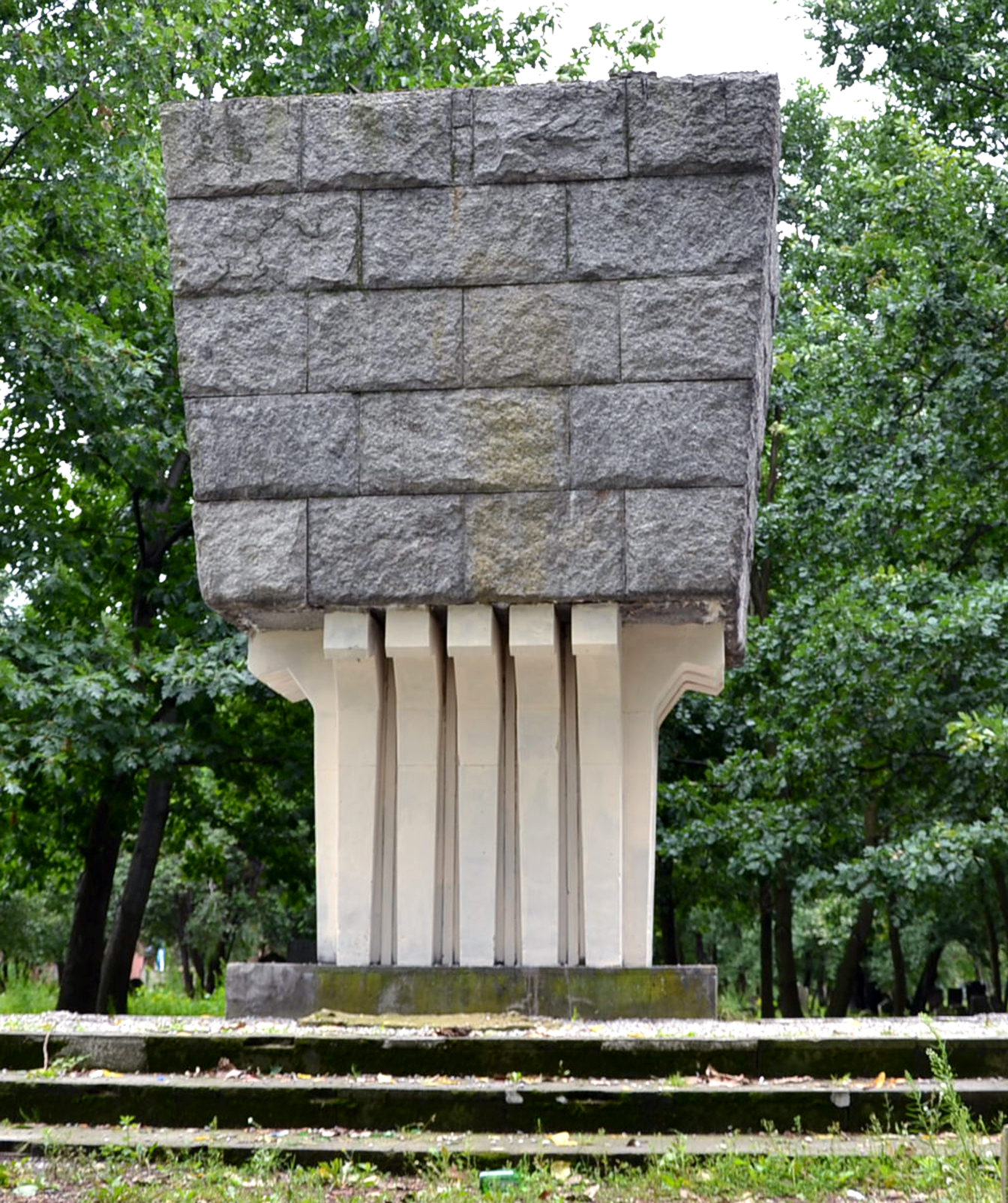
Memorial to the Holocaust victims at the Jewish cemetery in Mińsk

The underground resistance formed in the ghetto in mid 1941 and began planning an escape to freedom. Donations were collected for the purpose of buying weapons. A Jewish fund-raising was organized in June and July 1942. However, the very next month a ghetto liquidation action began on 21 August, commanded by SS-Untersturmführer Schmidt, the chief of Mińsk Gestapo. Some 5,000 Jews were loaded onto freight trains, locked in and sent away to Treblinka on the following day. Most of the remaining 1,000 to 1,300 Jews (many attempting to hide) were shot at various locations around town, along with all members of the Judenrat including its president Mosze Kramarz, his deputy Majer Bryks, as well as Jankiel Popowski, Hil Morgensztern, Mosze Wajnberg, Mr. Bressler, Mr. Słoń, Mr. Sztutman and others murdered behind the SS building on 35 Warszawska street. Several hundred men were allowed to live and split into prisoner work battalions, temporarily. The first group composed of 150 men was placed at the prewar iron foundry K. Rudzki i S-ka taken over by the Nazis, which was located at 55 Piłsudskiego street. The second group of around 500 men was moved to the premises of the Public School Nr 1 at 39 Siennicka street, as the work force for German company Wolf & Goebel.

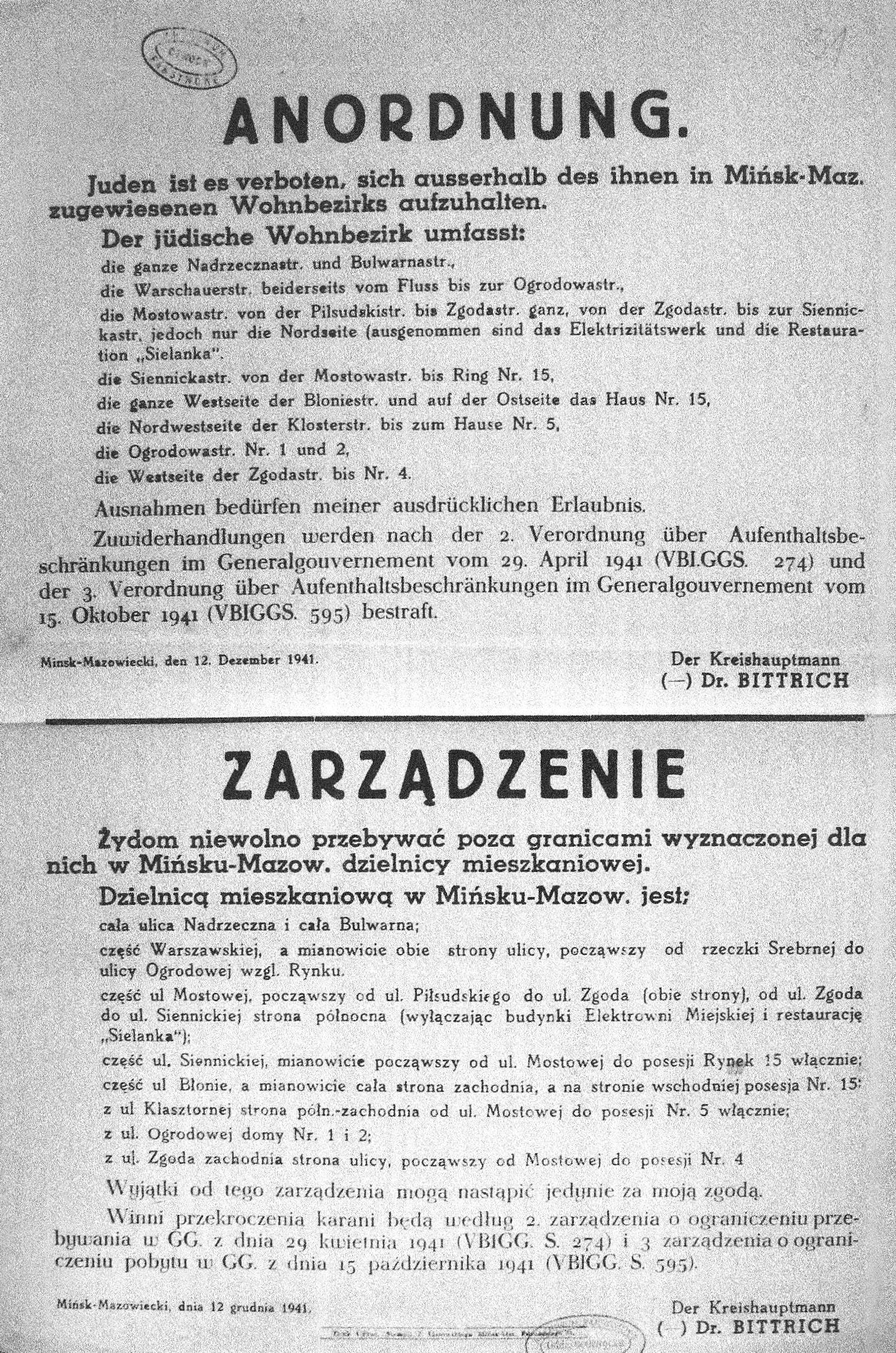
German announcement in Mińsk, prohibiting Jews from venturing outside the ghetto specified area. Signed by Kreishauptmann Bittrich on 12 December 1941.

The final wave of mass shootings began several months later. A large group of Jews from the school building (renamed Camp Kopernikus) were transported to the Jewish cemetery on 24 December 1942 and murdered there; those who remained (around 250 slave workers) were killed on 10 January 1943 following the Kopernikus prisoner revolt. The SS surrounded the premises planning a deportation action, but the prisoners locked themselves inside and resisted, putting the SS in a state of shocked disbelief. After a struggle, the building was eventually set on fire and burned down with the Jews inside. Meanwhile, at the K. Rudzki foundry (renamed Krupp AG) over 100 Jewish workers were extracted on 5 June 1943, and executed as the last. The ghetto was no more. An underground resistance movement developed in Mińsk, and later the Polish Home Army (AK) got a chance to retaliate. On 22 July 1943 the Gestapo chief Schmidt was ambushed and shot by the partisans.

At the end of the German occupation of Poland, Mińsk Mazowiecki was liberated not by the advancing Red Army, but by the Polish soldiers of the AK who entered the town ahead of them. Although 250 Jews of Mińsk are known to have survived – many of them saved by the Polish families on the "Aryan" side of the city (including those who managed to escape Treblinka deportations), the prewar Jewish community was effectively wiped out in Mińsk during the Holocaust. There was no-one, and nothing to go back to, after the war ended. The community, which had thrived since 1768, ceased to exist entirely. It has not been re-established.

== Notable individuals ==
- Julian Grobelny, Polish Righteous among the Nations who presided over Żegota, and sheltered Jews in hiding near Mińsk.

== See also ==
- Pińsk Ghetto revolt
- Łachwa Ghetto revolt
