= Mińsk Mazowiecki =

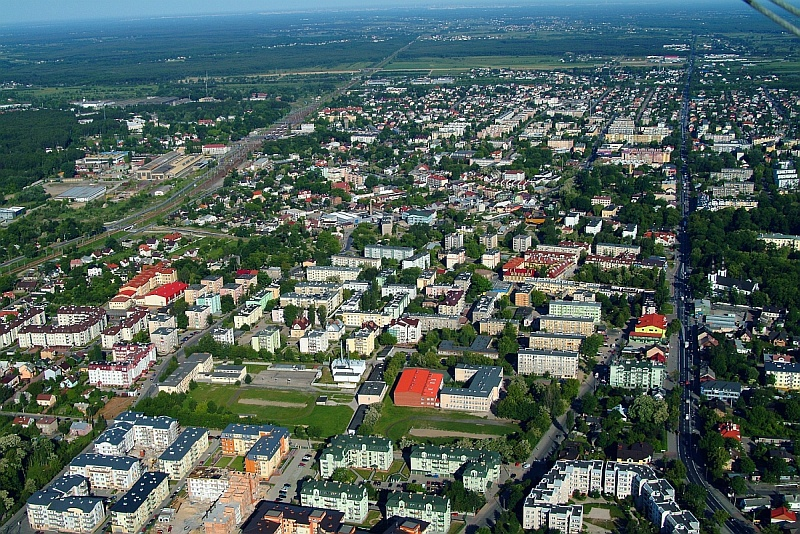
- Aerial view of Mińsk Mazowiecki

- Flag Coat of arms

- Location within Poland
- Coordinates: 52°11′N 21°34′E
- Country: Poland
- Voivodeship: Masovian
- County: Mińsk
- Gmina: Mińsk Mazowiecki (urban gmina)
- Established: 14th century
- Town rights: 1421, 29 May

Government
  - Mayor: Marcin Jakubowski

Area
  - Total: 13.12 km^{2} (5.07 sq mi)
- Elevation: 147 m (482 ft)

Population (2020)
  - Total: 40,999
  - Density: 3,125/km^{2} (8,094/sq mi)
- Time zone: UTC+1 (CET)
  - Summer (DST): UTC+2 (CEST)
- Postal code: 05-300, 301, 303
- Area code: +48 025
- Car plates: WM
- Website: http://www.minsk-maz.pl

Mińsk Mazowiecki (Polish pronunciation: [ˈmij̃sk mazɔˈvjɛtskʲi], lit. 'Masovian Minsk') is a town in eastern Poland with 40,999 inhabitants (2020). It is situated in the Masovian Voivodeship and is a part of the Warsaw metropolitan area. It is the capital of Mińsk County. Located 20 kilometers from the city limits of Warsaw and 38 kilometers from Warsaw's center.

== Name ==
The source of the town name Mińsk is the Mienia River, which in turn derives from the verb 'mienić', which means 'to shine'. The postnominal adjective 'Mazowiecki' shows the historical connection to Mazovia and distinguishes Mińsk Mazowiecki (English: “Masovian Minsk”) from the Belarusian capital of Minsk.

== Location ==
Mińsk Mazowiecki is located historically in the region of Mazovia and administratively in the eastern part of Masovian Voivodeship, 37 kilometres (23 miles) east from Warsaw's Center and 20 kilometres (12 miles) from Warsaw's border.

== History ==
The first mention of a settlement with commercial function comes from the 14th century. On 29 May 1421, Duke Janusz I of Warsaw from the Piast dynasty granted Mińsk town privileges. The first wooden church was built in 1422, however, it was not preserved. In 1549, the town of Sendomierz was located on the other side of Srebrna River. In 1629, the present church was opened. In 1695, Sendomierz was merged with Mińsk. The 18th century was a time of gradual decline of Mińsk connected with gradual decline of the Polish–Lithuanian Commonwealth.

Following the Third Partition of Poland, in 1795, the town was annexed by Austria. After the Polish victory in the Austro-Polish War of 1809, it became part of the short-lived Polish Duchy of Warsaw. After the duchy's dissolution, in 1815, it became part of Russian-controlled Congress Poland. During the November Uprising, it was the site of two battles between Polish insurgents and Russian troops, fought on 26 April and 14 July 1831.

In 1866, the Mińsk County was established, and the first train arrived to Mińsk (Warsaw–Terespol Railway). In 1867, the name of the town was changed to Nowomińsk (Novominsk). In 1870, the Dernałowicz Family became the last owners of the town (up to the Second World War). In 1886, the first bookstore in east Mazovia was founded in the town.

In 1910 or 1912, the Maria Grochowska's School was opened (present-day Polska Macierz Szkolna High School). In 1914, the old church was reopened after reconstruction, and the following year the present hospital was opened.

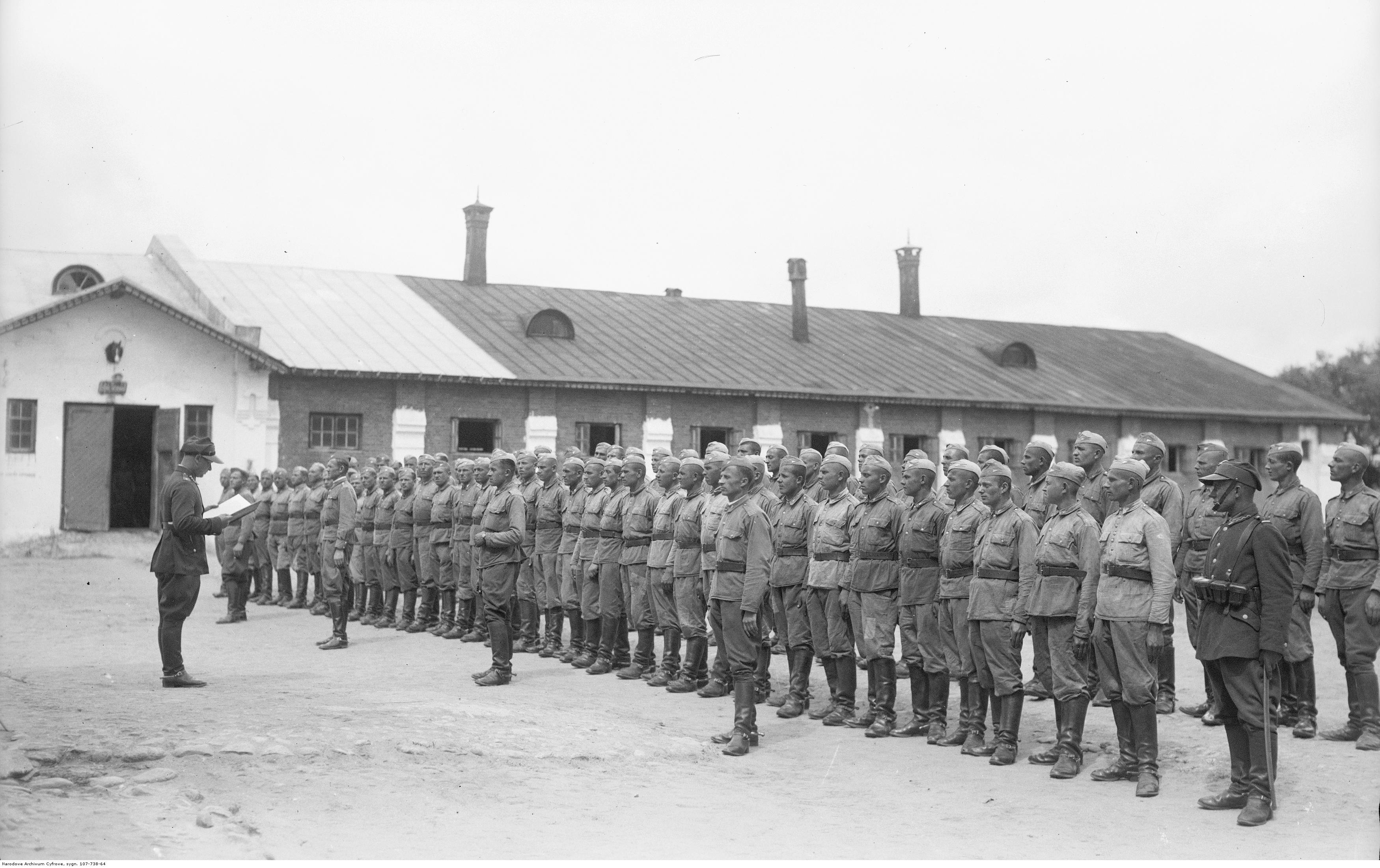
Garrison of the 7th Lublin Uhlan Regiment in 1935

During World War I, it was occupied by Germany from 1915 to 1918. In 1916, the town was renamed to Mińsk Mazowiecki. In 1918, Poland regained independence and control of Mińsk. During the Polish–Soviet War, it was briefly occupied by the Russians on 16 August 1920, and then recaptured by the Poles the next day. On 18 August 1920 Marshal Józef Piłsudski stayed in the town. In the interbellum, the town enjoyed great development, and in 1937 the first electric train arrived. The 7th Lublin Uhlan Regiment was stationed in Mińsk Mazowiecki in the interbellum, and nowadays there is a museum dedicated to the unit in the town.

On 13 September 1939, it was the site of the Battle of Mińsk Mazowiecki between Poles led by General Władysław Anders and the invading German army. Afterwards it fell under German occupation. In 1939, some expelled Poles from Barcin, Kępno, Ostrzeszów, Rychtal and Szubin were deported to Mińsk Mazowiecki. In October 1940, the occupiers established the Mińsk Mazowiecki Ghetto, which was eventually liquidated on 21 July 1942, with most of the Jewish residents murdered at the Treblinka extermination camp in one of the first episodes of the Holocaust. Two Poles who were held by the Germans in the local prison for rescuing Jews were liberated by the Polish resistance. On 30 July 1944, Mińsk Mazowiecki was liberated by the Polish underground Home Army (prelude to the Warsaw Uprising), however, the Soviets occupied the town the next day. On 2–3 March 1945, the Soviets carried out executions of the local Polish elite, including Mayor Hipolit Konopka. After the war, the town was restored to Poland, although with a Soviet-installed communist regime, which stayed in power until the Fall of Communism in the 1980s.

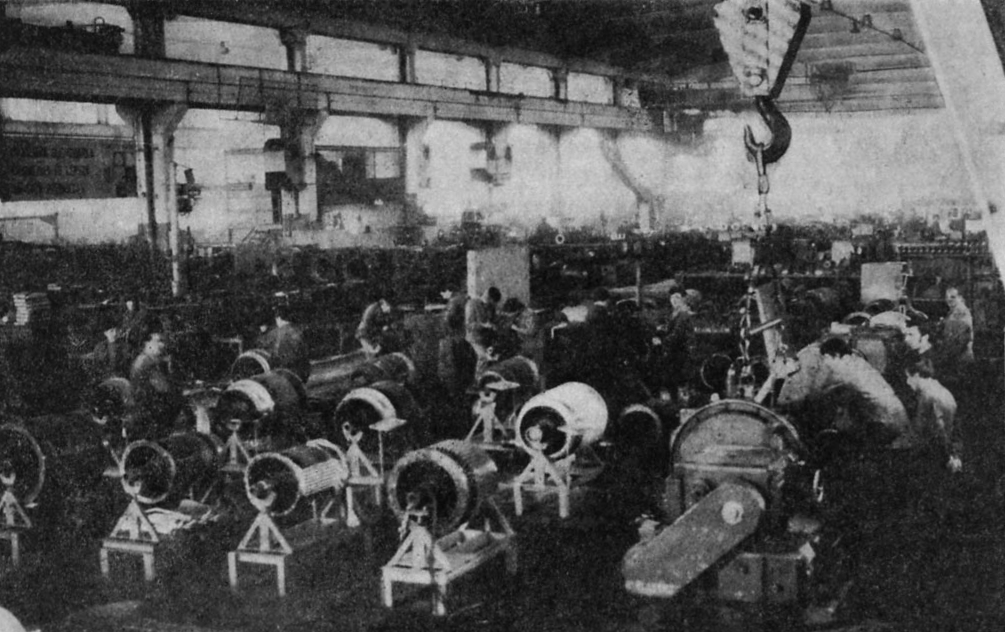
ZNTK Mińsk Mazowiecki between 1954 and 1974

In 1952, the ZNTK Mińsk Mazowiecki train construction factory was founded. In 1957, Mińsk Mazowiecki became a military garrison. A new train station was opened in 1979. Solidarity events took place in 1985. In 1990, Zbigniew Grzesiak was elected Mayor in first post-WWII free elections. In 1999, the Mińsk County was established.

=== Jewish history ===
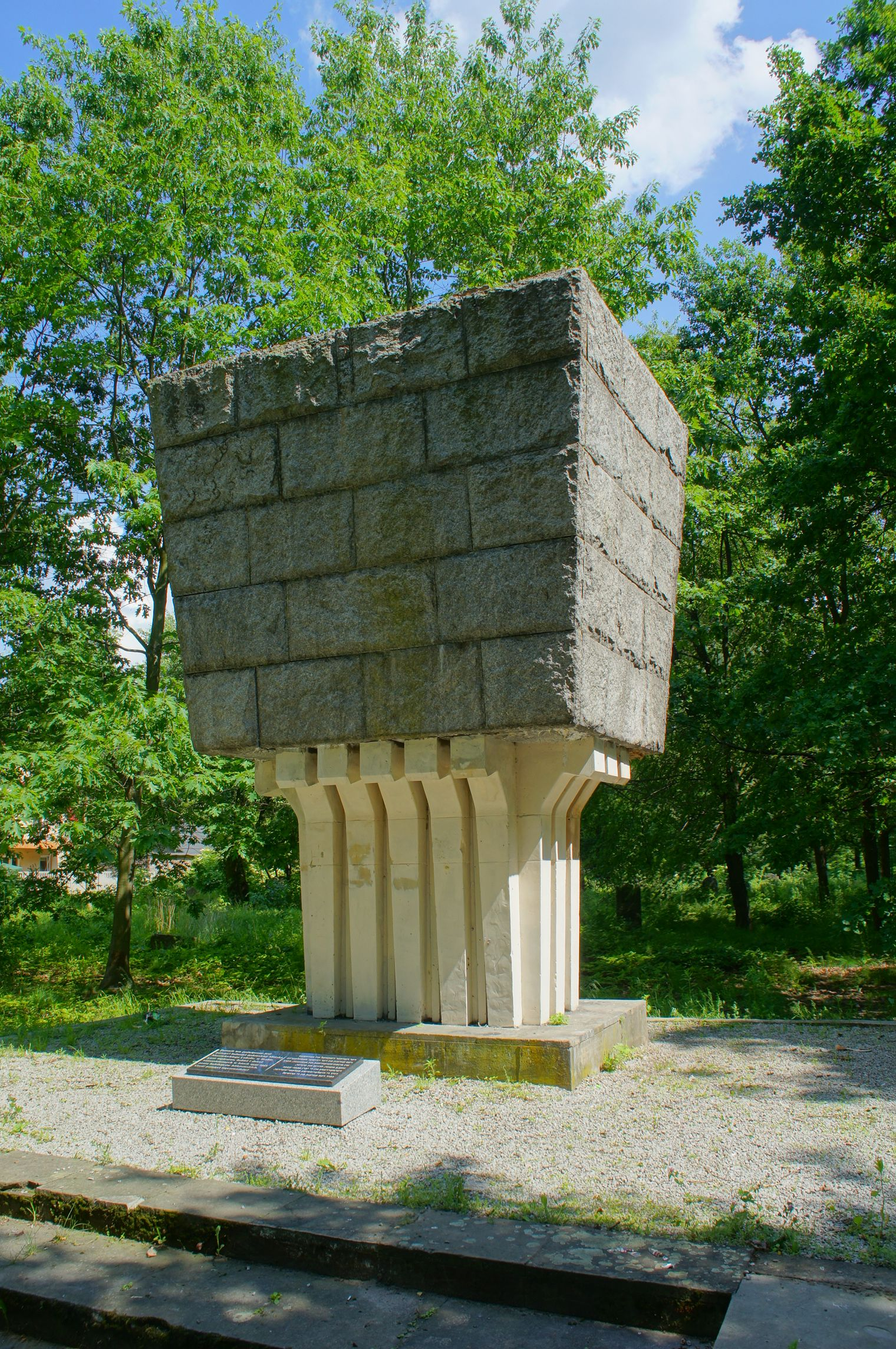
Memorial to the local Holocaust victims

In 1768, the restrictions on permanent residence for Jewish people in Mińsk had been lifted. From the 19th century to the 1930s, it became very popular. Before the Second World War, there were thousands of Jews living in Mińsk, and they had a general synagogue and smaller temples. The Novominsk hasidic dynasty was founded here in the late 19th century by Rabbi Yaakov Perlow, a descendant of the Baal Shem Tov.

Soon after the war began, the Germans created the Mińsk Ghetto. It was liquidated on 21 July 1942. Most of the Jews were murdered in Treblinka extermination camp sent in Holocaust trains by the thousands. The remaining Jewish population were murdered in Mińsk on 10 January 1943 (500 people) and 5 June (the last 150 people).

== Monuments ==
Historic churches in Mińsk Mazowiecki

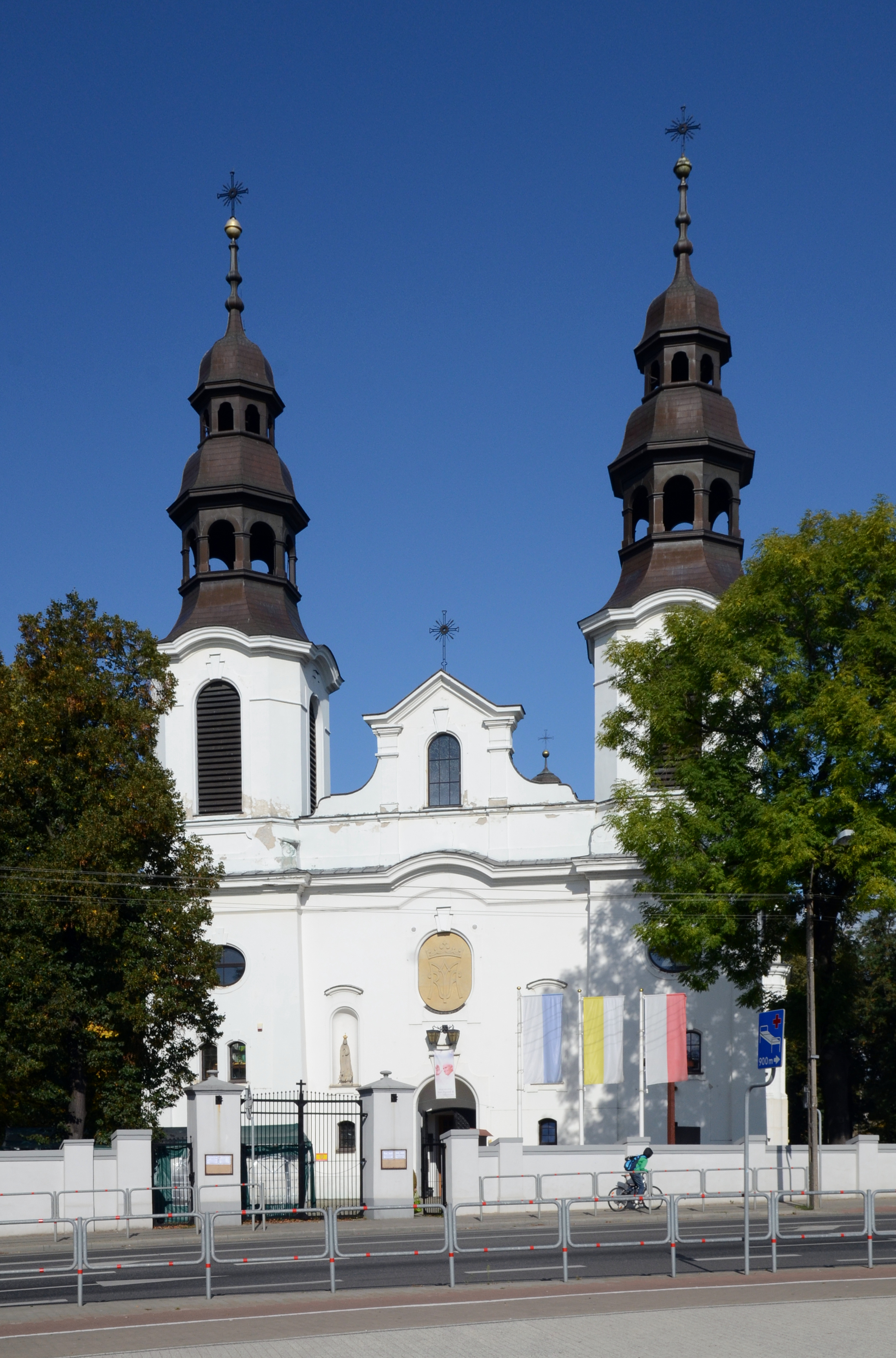
Church of the Nativity of the Virgin Mary

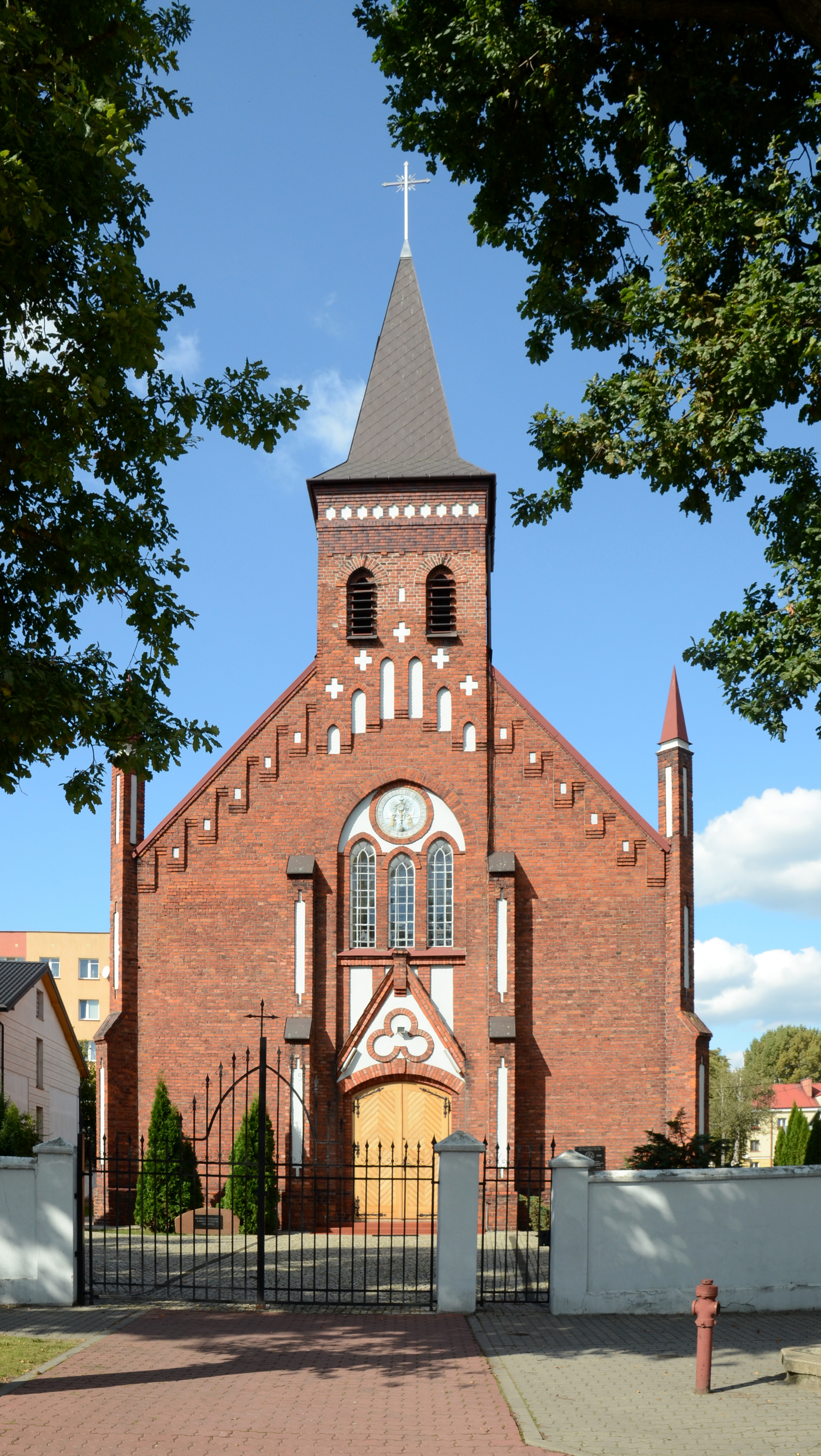
Mariavite Church

- layout of medieval settlement and later city
- Palace of Doria Dernałowicz Family – built probably in the 17th century (in place of 16th century residence), converted to classicism
  - park
- Church of the Nativity of The Blessed Virgin Mary – built in the 17th century, converted to neo-baroque in the early 20th century
  - internal furnishing
  - cemetery
- county hall (former), 19th century, classicism
- county hall, 19th century
- post office, 19th century, empire
- church of Mariavite Church, 1911
- residential areas, 19th and early 20th century
- Jewish cemetery
- some school buildings (early 20th century)

== Economy ==
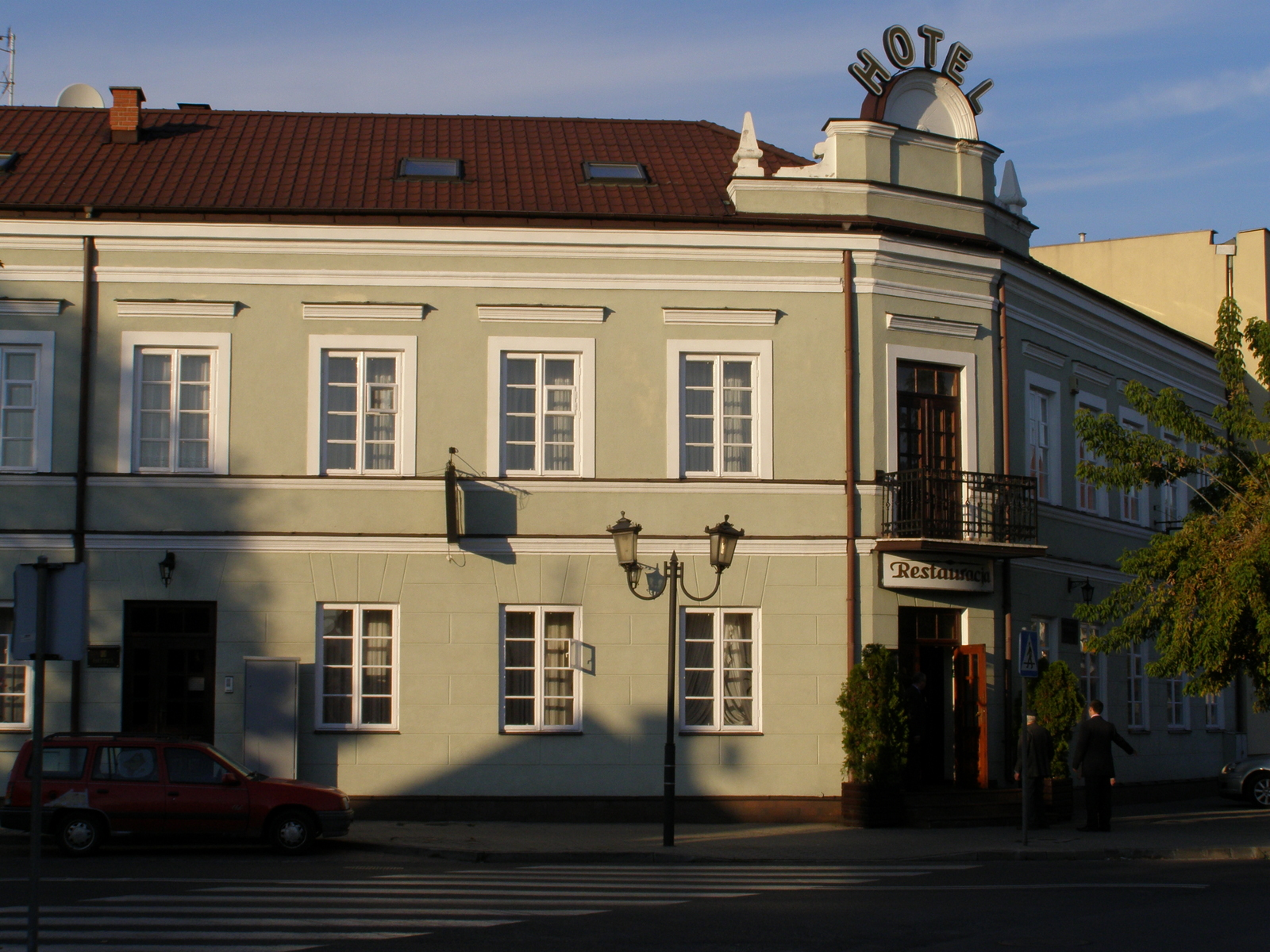
Stylowa Hotel and Restaurant

Trade:

- hypermarket Carrefour
- supermarkets (about 10)
- many other shops
- market
- developers

Service:

- 10 banks
- fast-foods, pubs and restaurants
- 3 hotels
- construction industry
- car service
- satellite communication

Industry:

- ZNTK "Mińsk Mazowiecki" (since 2008 a subsidiary PESA SA) – maintenance and repair of railway rolling stock
- Fabryka Urządzeń Dźwigowych – production of cranes and other heavy machinery
- cotton products
- yachts
- shoes
- foil

== Population ==
Age / Gender	Number	Total
Male 0–18	3,978	7,618
Female 0–18	3,640	7,618
Men 18–65	12,283	
Women 18–60	12,496	
Work-age		24,779
Retired men	1,572	
Retired women	3,560	
Retired-age		5,132
All		37,529

Year	Number	Year	Number
16th century (second half)	3,5-4,000	1660	1,000
1777	456	1827	750
1880	2,940	early 20th	4,771
1910	5,794	1921	10,689
1939	15,103	1945	10,500
1971	24,700	1992	34,000
1995	35,068	2000	35,761
2006	37,529		

== Education ==
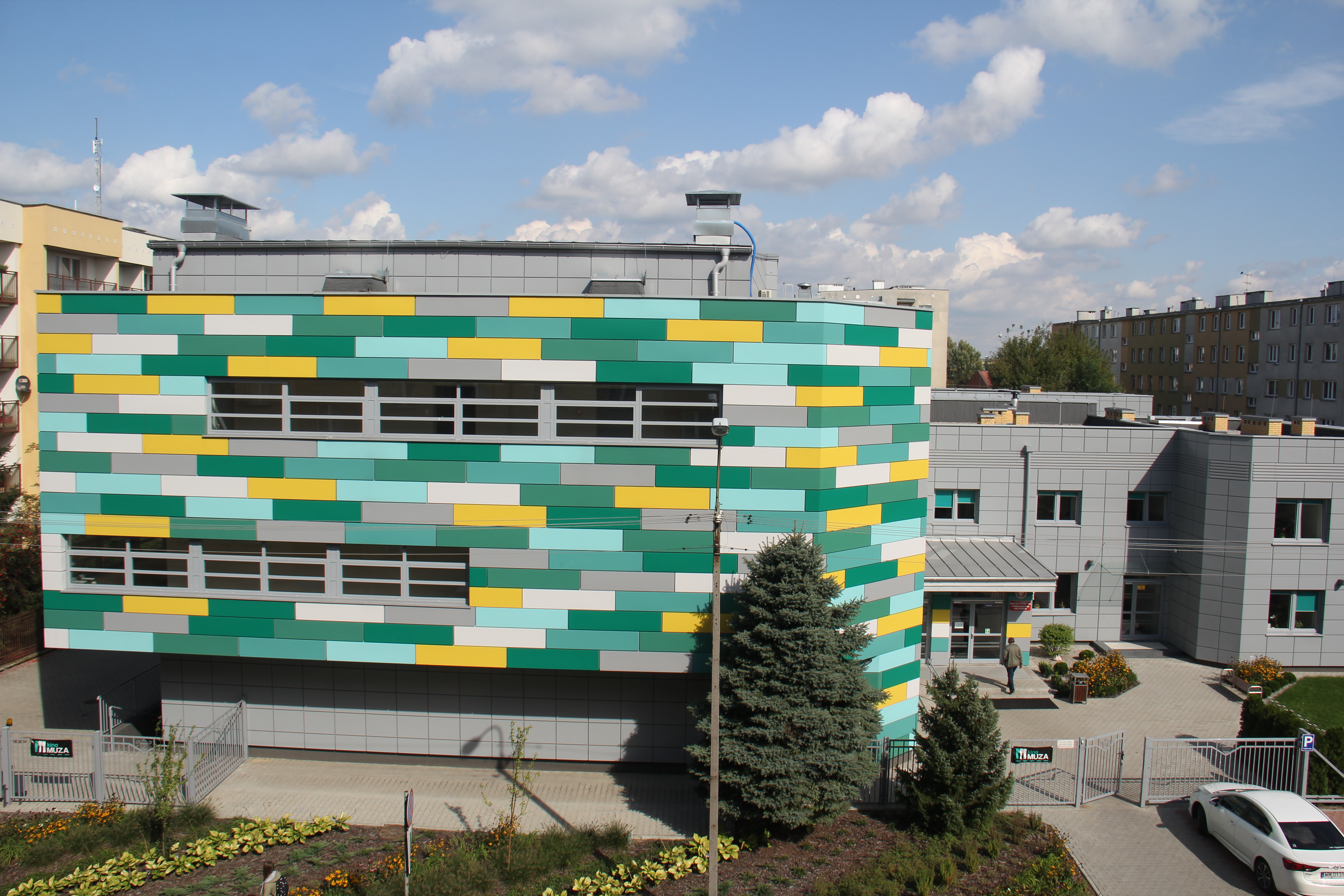
Art school

- Józef Majka College of Social Science (catholic)
- Stanisław Staszic Lifelong Learning Center
- University of Third Age
- Polska Macierz Szkolna High School
- Salesian Elementary and High School (catholic)
- Kazimierz Wielki Professional High School
- Powstańcy Warszawy Professional High School
- High School of Economy
- Maria Skłodowska-Curie High School
- 6 public elementary schools
- over 10 preschools (6 public)
- special school (for kids with problems)
- clinic of psychological and pedagogical help

== Bureaus ==
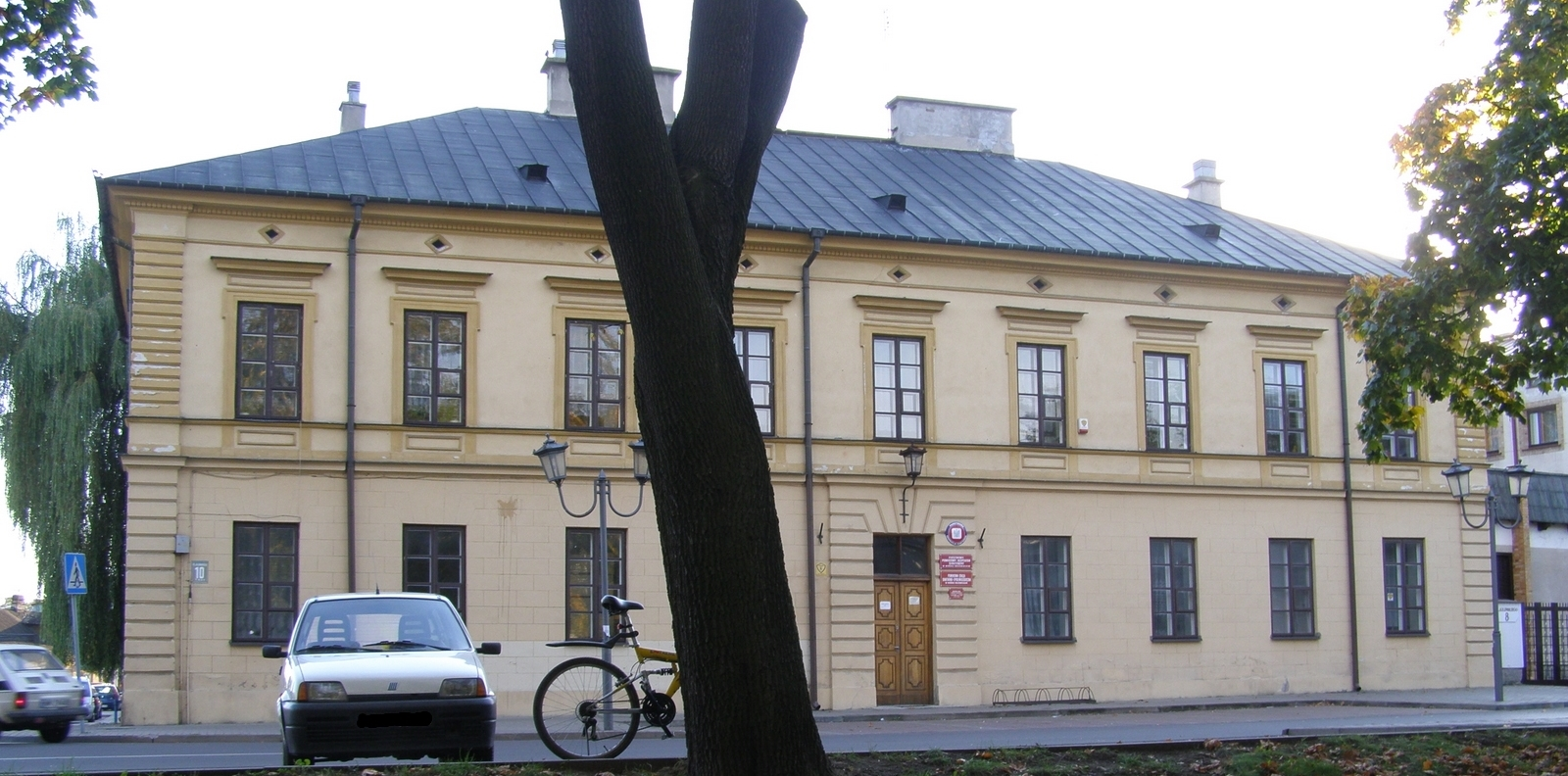
19th-century County Hall

- Regional Bureau of Environmental Protection Inspection
- Point of Conscription
- Above Forester Bureau (Nadleśnictwo Mińsk)
- County, city and commune bureaus

== Safety ==
- Police Department of Mińsk County – 2 building in Mińsk, dozens of cars (including sport cars and off-road cars)
- Fire Department of Mińsk County – quite new fire engines (well equipped after big fire in industry area a few years ago)
- Public Hospital of Mińsk County

== Culture and sports ==
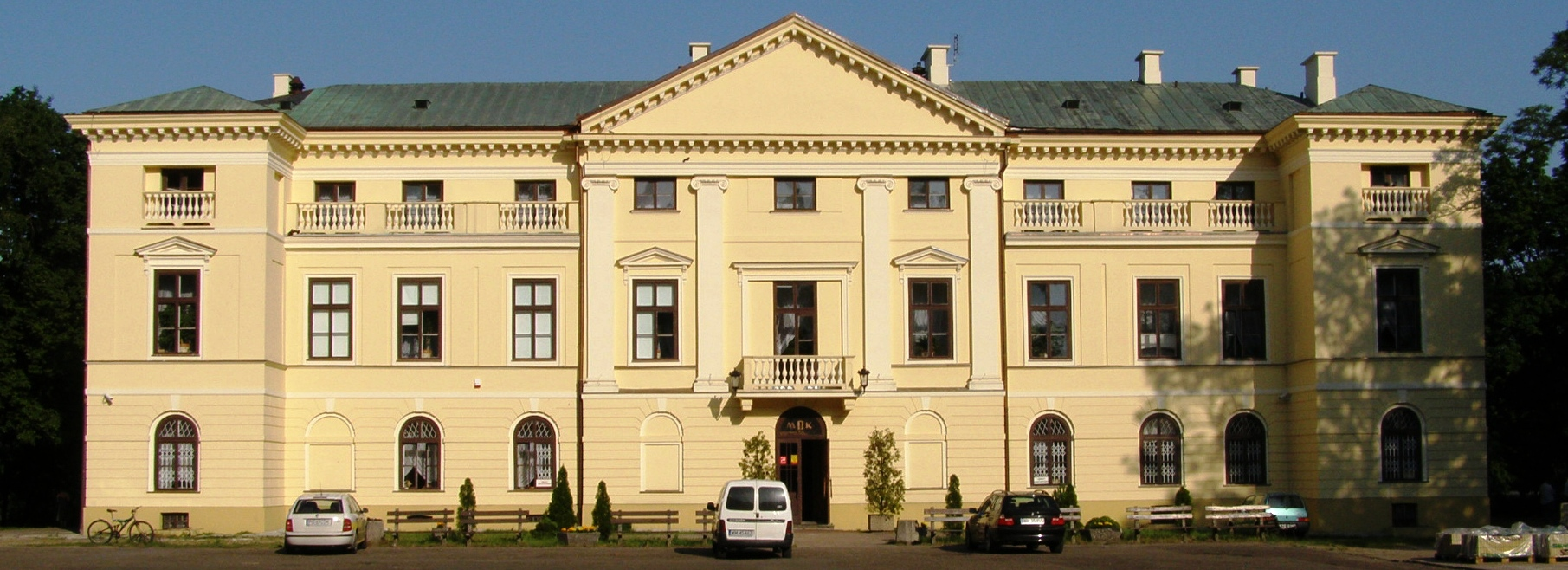
Dernałowicz Palace, now housing the Culture Center

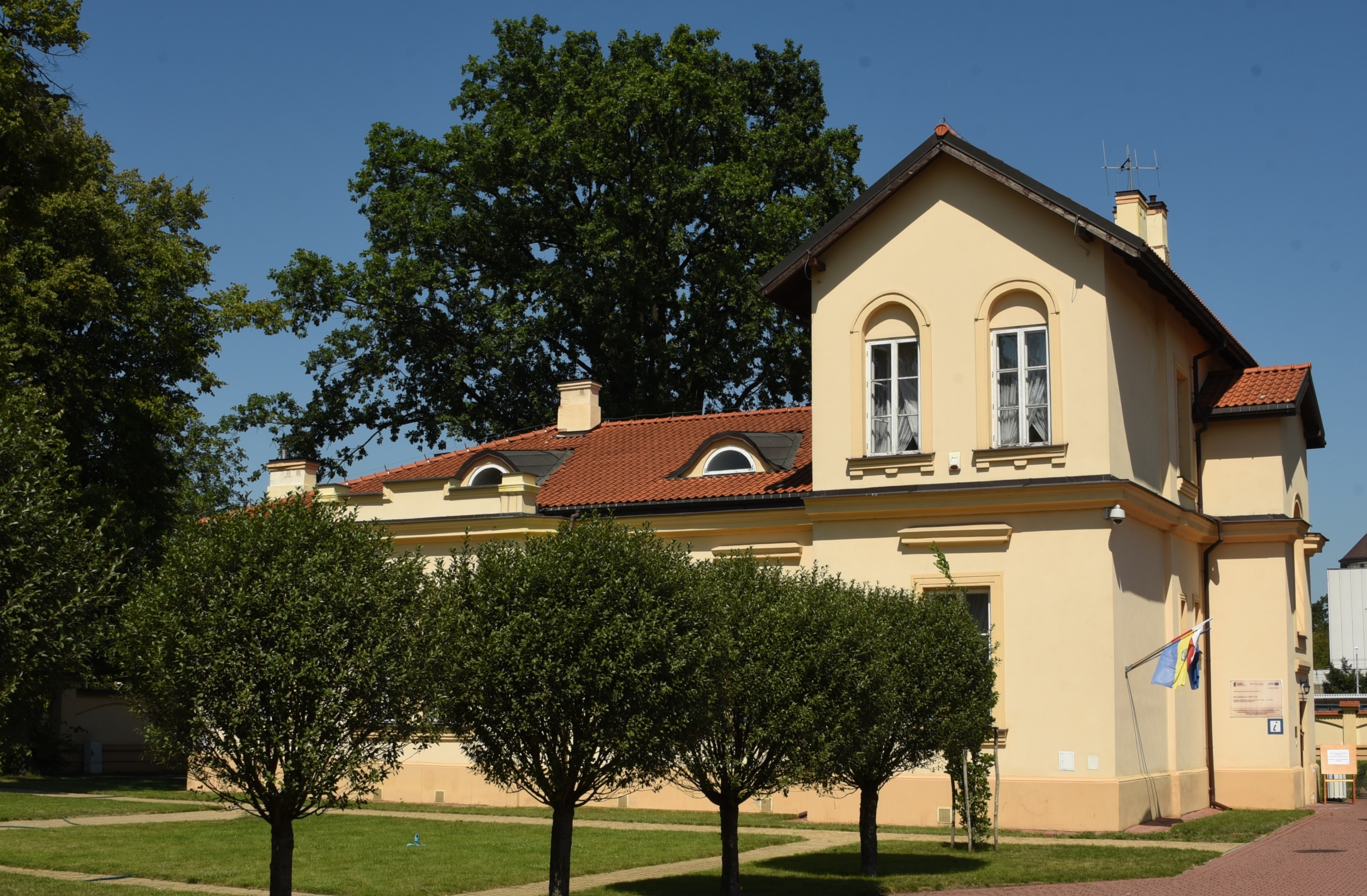
Museum of the 7th Lublin Uhlan Regiment

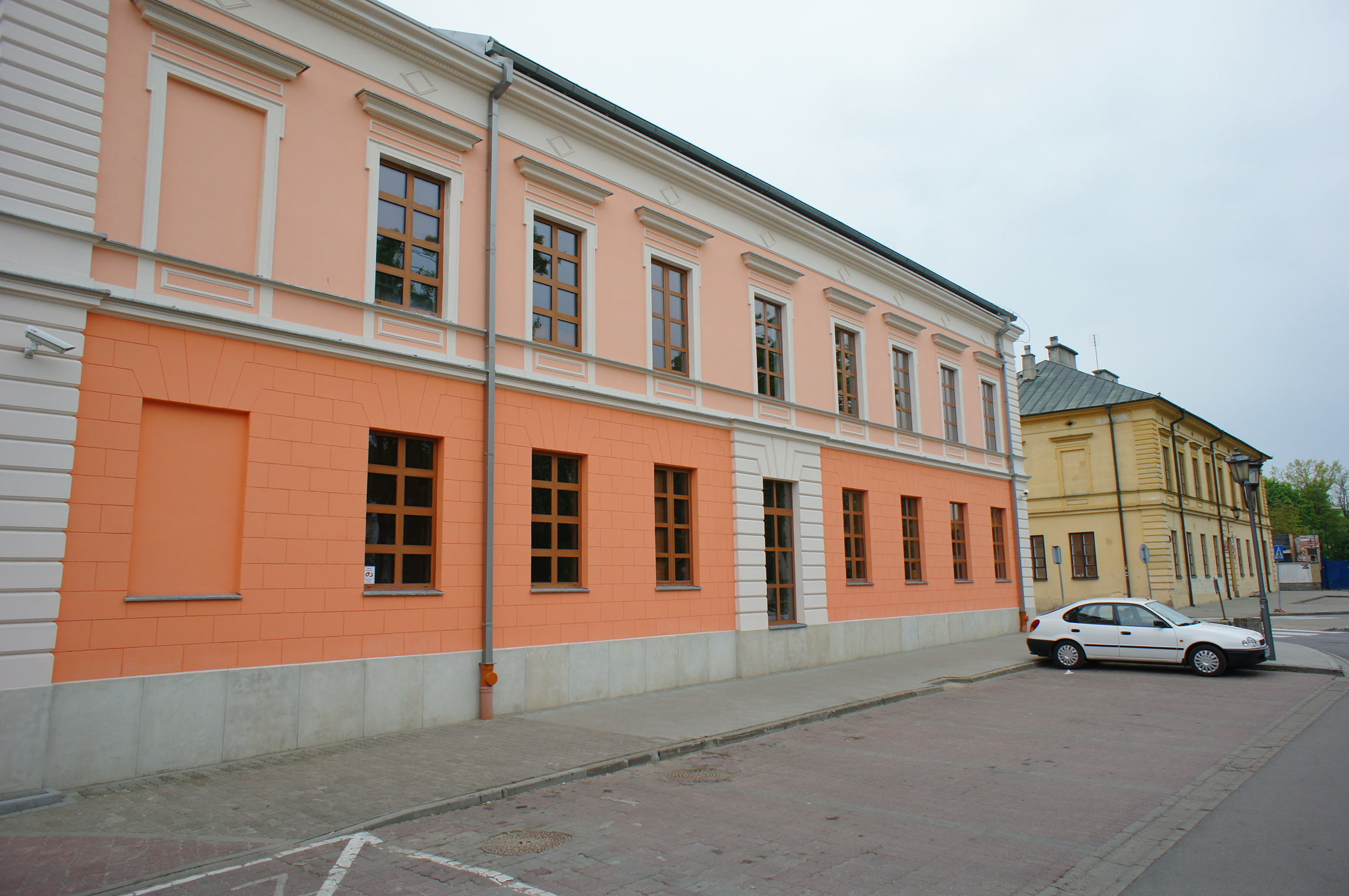
Municipal Public Library

Culture:

- House of Culture
- School of Art
- 2 libraries
- 2 museums
- Cinema
- Magazines (2 public and 3 commercial are published in Mińsk)

Sport:

- Miejski Ośrodek Sportu i Rekreacji (public sport and recreation department)
  - 2 stadiums
  - Ice rink
- Mazovia-ZNTK
  - Football team in local amateur league

== Religions ==
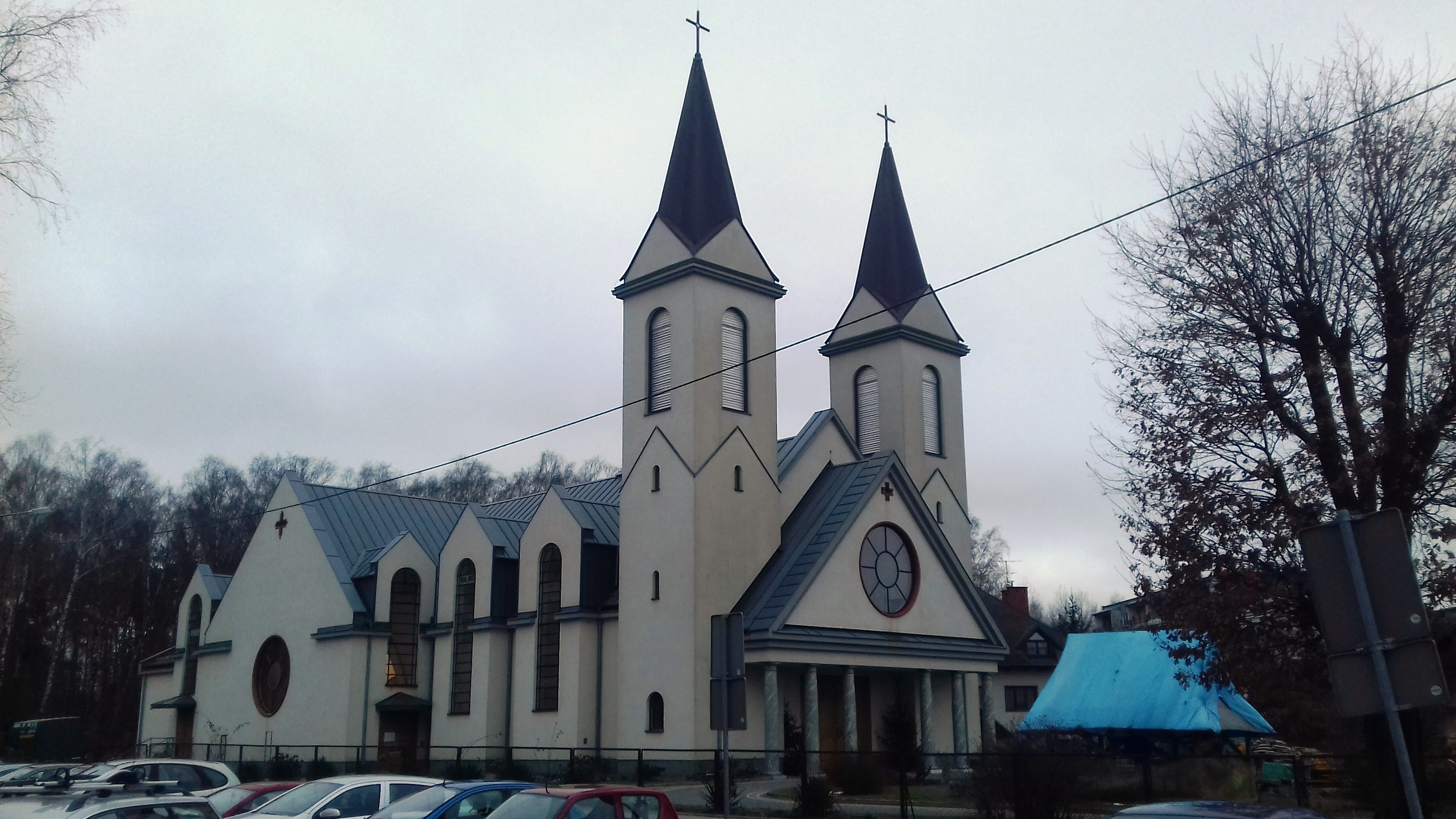
St. Anthony Church

- Roman Catholic Church (4 parishes and other structures)
- Mariavite Church (1 parish)
- Baptist (1 congregation)
- Mennonite (1 congregation)

== Transport ==
The A2 motorway bypasses the town to the north This provides faster access to Warsaw and to Siedlce.

National road 92 still runs right through the town. National road 50 bypasses the town to the west.

There are regular train services (39 trains in one way daily) to Warsaw. There are direct connections with many cities in Poland, and with Moscow (currently suspended due to the conflict in Ukraine.)

There are two regular bus services to Warsaw.

== Lands ==
Overall: 13.12 square kilometres (5.07 sq mi)

- Residential: 30%
- Industrial: 6%
- Communication (roads, railroads etc.): 15%
- Agricultural: 29%
- Parks: 5%
- Other: 15%

== Historical parts of city ==

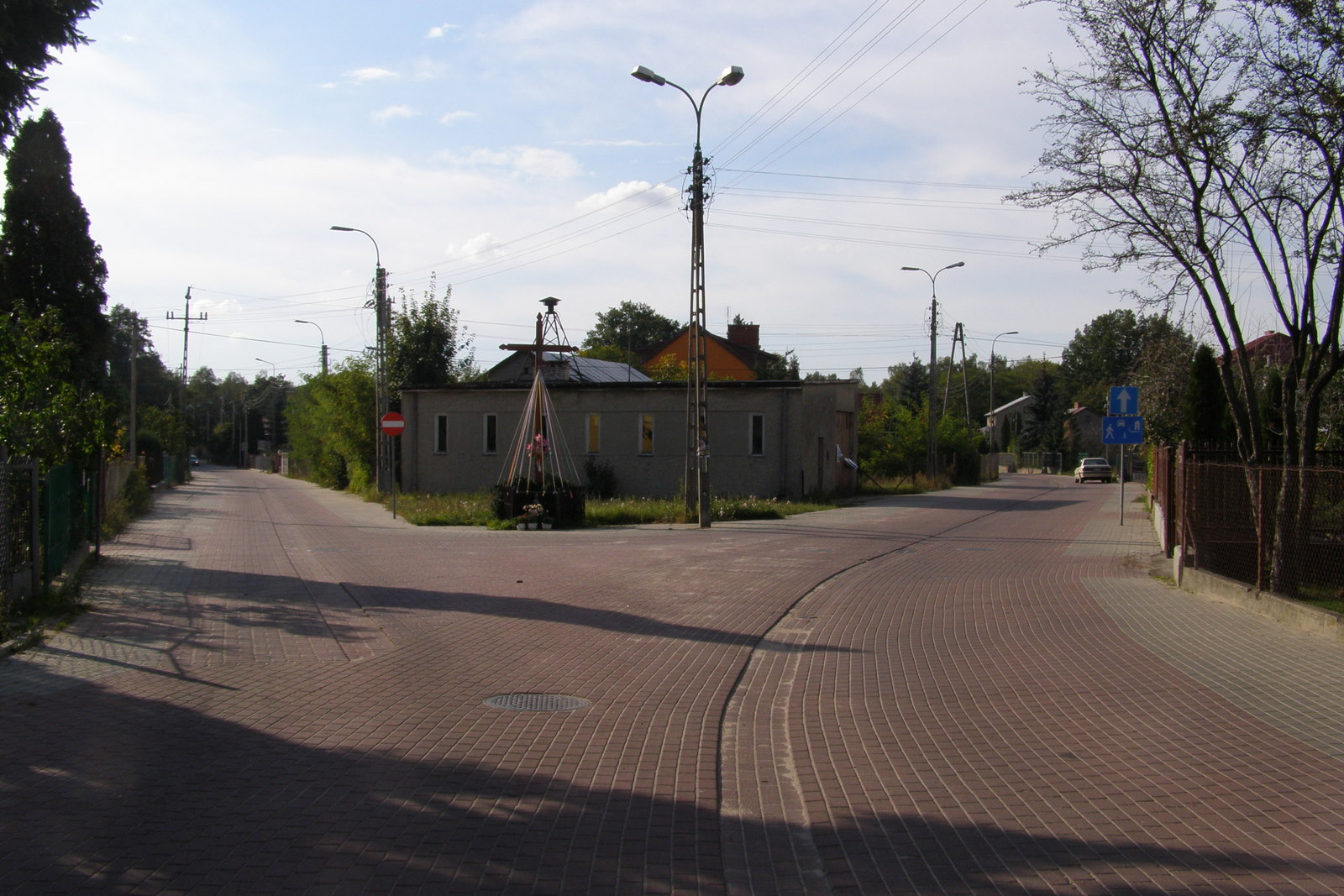
Anielina

Cities:

- Mińsk – old town
- Sendomierz (found 1549, joined 1695)

Estates built as part of Mińsk:

- Nowe Miasto – Miasto Ogród – New Town – Garden Town (found 1936)
- Concrete estates built in socialist realism (about 1945–1990) without names
- Modern estates without names

Villages:

- Over railroad part of city (all existed in 1839 and earlier)
  - Kędzierak (joined partly in 1954 and fully in 1984)
  - Stankowizna (joined in 19th or 20th century)
  - Anielina (joined in similar time as Kędzierak)
- Other
  - Górki (joined in the 18th century)
  - Goździk (joined during First World War)
  - Kolonia Stasinów (joined in 1936)
  - Pohulanka (joined partly in 1936)
  - Sewerynów (joined in similar time as Kędzierak)

== Military ==
- Military police
- 23rd Air Base with FA-50 aircraft

== Twin towns – sister cities ==
Mińsk Mazowiecki is twinned with:

- Borodianka, Ukraine
- Krnov, Czech Republic
- Lacey, United States
- Pefki, Greece
- Saint-Égrève, France
- Telšiai, Lithuania

== Notable people ==
- Julian Grobelny, Righteous Among the Nations
- Louis B. Mayer, Hollywood film producer and studio executive
- Czesław Mroczek, poseł
- Teresa Wargocka, poseł
- Moshe Carmel, politician in Israel
- Stefan Żeromski, writer
- Jan Himilsbach, actor and author
- Leyb Rokhman, Yiddish writer in Israel
- Hanna Dunowska, actor
- Victor Prus, architect in Canada
- Yeshurun Keshet Israeli poet, essayist, translator and literary critic
- Jacques Kalisz, architect in France
- Stanislav Redens, secret police officer in the Soviet Union
- Hermann Birnbach, subject of a Stolperstein in Nordhausen
- Marek Piotrowski, World Champion in Kickboxing
- Rafał Jackiewicz, boxer
