= The Cruise (1970 film) =

Rejs
- DVD cover of a recent Polish movie edition
- Directed by: Marek Piwowski
- Written by: Andrzej Barszczyński; Janusz Głowacki; Jerzy Karaszkiewicz; Marek Piwowski
- Starring: Stanisław Tym; Zdzisław Maklakiewicz; Jan Himilsbach
- Cinematography: Andrzej Barszczynski; Marek Nowicki
- Edited by: Lidia Pacewicz
- Music by: Wojciech Kilar
- Release date: 1970
- Running time: 65
- Country: Poland
- Language: Polish

Rejs, known in English as The Cruise (or The Trip Down the River), is a Polish comedy film released in 1970, directed by Marek Piwowski who also co-wrote the screenplay with Andrzej Barszczyński, Janusz Głowacki and Jerzy Karaszkiewicz. The score was composed by Wojciech Kilar.

Rejs is considered as a masterpiece by many and as the earliest cult film in Polish cinema. Shot in a quasi-documentary style, with a cast featuring not more than two or three professional actors, the absurd plot parodies life in the People's Republic of Poland, reducing a weekend river cruise to a hilarious parody of the entire communist system.

Screenshot from the movie

== Plot ==
A stowaway (Stanisław Tym) sneaks aboard a ship departing on a cruise down the Vistula River. The captain takes him for a Communist Party cultural coordinator and the intruder gladly adapts to his new role, immediately setting to work at manipulating the passengers and crew into silly and vaguely humiliating games. Before long, Tym has got everyone under his thumb and created his own comedic dictatorship. A memorable performance was given by Jan Himilsbach, an amateur actor who formerly carved tombstones.

== Production ==
The film was directed in such a way that the characters' behaviors and expressions sound natural and the film resembles a documentary shot with a hidden camera. The characters were played by many non-actors or theater actors who had not acted in films before, and some scenes were improvised. Because of the low budget, the film was shot on black-and-white film stock with a single camera. The only lens the crew had for close-ups malfunctioned, so zooming was done by having the characters move closer to the camera. The non-professional actors didn't know how to move, so the cameraman drew them to the camera by pulling on a string tied to their leg. The film crew called this technique "Turkish zoom".

== See also ==
- Cinema of Poland
- List of Polish language films
- River cruise
