= Jan Himilsbach =

Stonecutter, actor and writer (1931–1988)

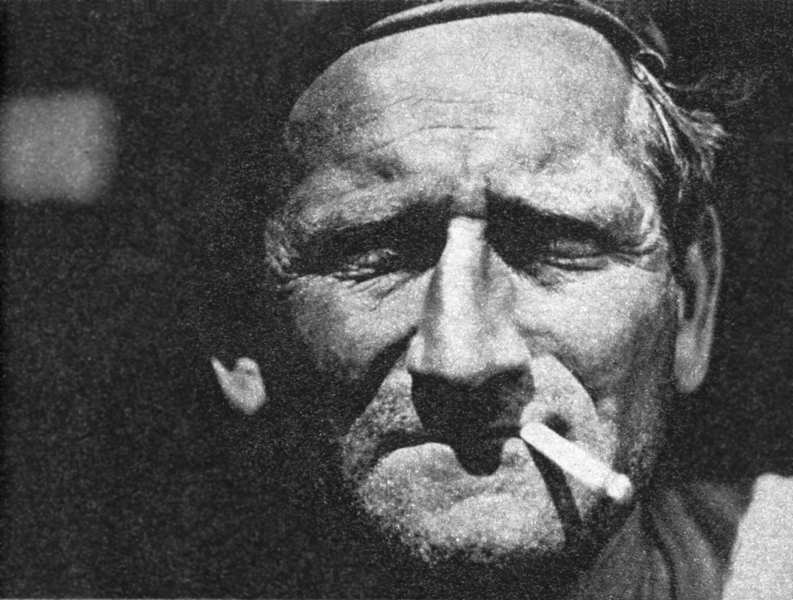
- Born: 1931; Mińsk Mazowiecki
- Died: 11 November 1988 (aged 56–57); Warsaw
- Occupations: Stonecutter, actor, writer, screenwriter

Jan Himilsbach (1931– 11 November 1988) was a stonecutter, actor, writer and screenwriter.

== Biography ==
He was the son of Stanisław, a manual worker, and Marianna. Until the end of World War II he lived in Mińsk Mazowiecki. In 1945, he became a member of the Union of Youth Struggle and worked distributing the newspapers Głos Ludu (Poland) and Chłopska Droga.

He learned at the Provincial University of Marxism–Leninism and worked at the Capital City Board of the Union of Polish Youth. He made his debut in 1951 with the poem Będę poetą (I Will Be a Poet), in Sztandar Młodych. He performed his military service from 1954 to 1956. From 1956 to 1968, he worked for a private stonemasonry firm in the Powązki district of Warsaw.

He was buried at the Northern Cemetery in Wólka Węglowa.

== Works ==
=== Short stories collections ===
- Monidło. 1967.
- Przepychanka. 1974.
- Łzy sołtysa. 1982.

== Filmography ==
=== As actor ===
- Rejs (1970)
- Trzeba zabić tę miłość (1972) as construction site caretaker
- A Jungle Book of Regulations (1974)
- Party przy świecach (1980, television film)

=== As screenwriter ===
- Wniebowzięci (1973, television film)
- Przyjęcie na dziesięć osób plus trzy (1973, television film)
- Chleba naszego powszedniego (1974, television film)
- Party przy świecach (1980, television film)
- Zabawa w chowanego (1984)
- Jedenaste przykazanie (1988, television film)

=== Adapted from Himilsbach's short story to a screenplay by a different author ===
- Fucha (1983)

== Bibliography ==
- Poppek, Anna (2013). Rejs na krzywy ryj..., czyli Jan Himilsbach i jego czasy. Kraków: A. Liber, Vis-a-Vis/Etiuda.
- Piotr Siła, ed. (2014). Mój Himilsbach, czyli wspomnienia o Janku H. Mińsk Mazowiecki: Miejski Dom Kultury.
