= Marek Piwowski =

Polish film director and screenwriter (born 1935)

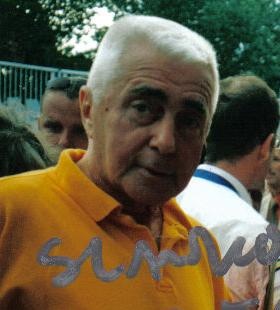
Marek Piwowski in 2007

Marek Andrzej Piwowski (Polish pronunciation: [ˈmarɛk piˈvɔfskʲi]; born 1935 in Warsaw) is a Polish film director and screenwriter. He is best known for his cult film Rejs (1970).

== Filmography ==
- Rejs – 1970
- Psychodrama – 1972
- Korkociąg (pl) – 1972
- Przepraszam, czy tu biją? (pl) – 1976
- Uprowadzenie Agaty (pl) – 1993
- Oskar (pl) – 2005

== Awards ==
- 1976 – Przepraszam, czy tu biją? FPFF – Jury Main Award
- 1976 – Przepraszam, czy tu biją? FPFF – Publicity Award
- 1977 – Przepraszam, czy tu biją? Złota Kamera (Gold Camera) (magazine "Film") in category: best movie
- 1997 – Krok Przegląd "Felliniada" – Wielki Fe Fe – for doing his job in movies
- 1998 – Krok International Short Movies Festival – Brązowy Smok (Golden Dragon)
- 2001 – Krzyż Komandorski Orderu Odrodzenia Polski (Polish Comoddore Cross)
