= Janusz Głowacki =

Polish playwright, essayist and screenwriter (1938 – 2017)

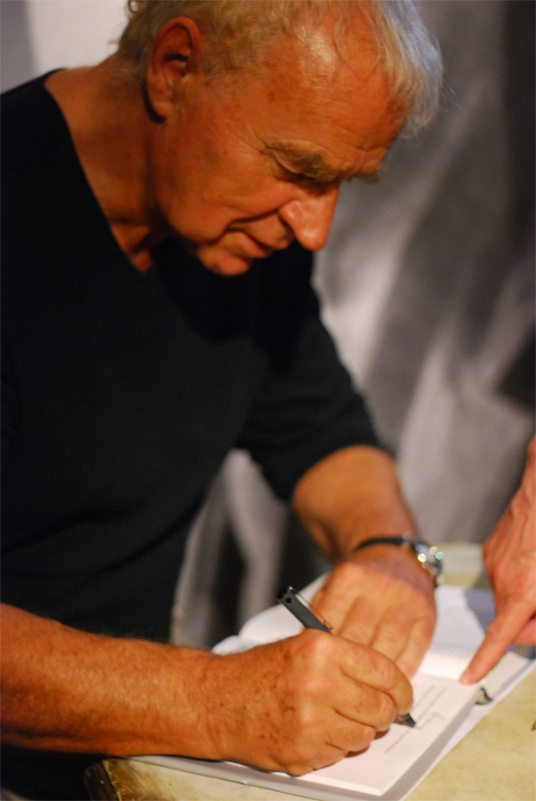
- Janusz Głowacki at the 2009 Literaturomania Festival
- Born: Janusz Andrzej Głowacki; 13 September 1938; Poznań, Poland
- Died: 19 August 2017 (aged 78); Egypt
- Education: University of Warsaw
- Occupations: Playwright; Essayist
- Spouse(s): 1) Ewa Zadrzyńska (divorced); 2) Olena Leonenko (2015-2017; his death)
- Children: Zuzanna Glowacka
- Writing career
- Notable works: Antigone in New York; Fortinbras Gets Drunk; The Fourth Sister; Hunting Cockroaches
- Notable awards: 1988 Guggenheim Fellowship; 1994 Jurzykowski Prize; 1999 Tony Cox Award; 2011 Czesław Miłosz Award

Janusz Andrzej Głowacki (13 September 1938 – 19 August 2017), better known as Janusz Głowacki or colloquially simply as Głowa, was a Polish playwright, essayist and screenwriter. Głowacki was the recipient of multiple awards and honours, including Guggenheim Fellowship, two Nike Award nominations and BAFTA Award nomination. He was awarded the Gloria Artis Gold Medal in 2005 for his contribution to Polish culture, and in 2014, the Commander's Cross of the Order of Polonia Restituta.

== Biography ==
Janusz Andrzej Głowacki was born into an intelligentsia family on 13 September 1938 in Poznań. He was the son of Helena Głowacka (née Helena Rudzka, d. 1991), a literary editor, sister of Polish character actor, Kazimierz Rudzki; and Jerzy Głowacki, a crime fiction novelist.

Głowacki appeared in two plays produced by the Students' Satirical Theatre during his high school years and was interested in serious theater, which led to his enrollment to the Aleksander Zelwerowicz National Academy of Dramatic Art in Warsaw. He attended Academy, but by his own account had problems adjusting to the college, and dropped out. He later attended the University of Warsaw, where he studied both history and Polish philology and eventually earned a Master of Arts in the latter in 1961.

He began his literary career by publishing his collections of short stories depicting the cultural and social reality of the 1960s and 1970s in Poland, such as The Nonsense Spinner (1968) and The New La-ba-da Dance (1970). His works achieved great popularity and made him famous, thanks especially to his satirical portrayal of social phenomena in regularly published articles.

He wrote the screenplay for Andrzej Wajda's Polowanie na muchy (1969) (Hunting Flies) co-wrote the screenplay of the popular Polish movie Rejs (The Cruise), released in 1970., and wrote the screenplay of Trzeba zabić tę miłość (1972). The 2001 film Mechanical Suite is based on his short story Brothers. Głowacki co-wrote screenplay for Cold War, which was selected to compete for the Palme d'Or at the 2018 Cannes Film Festival.

In 1981 he emigrated to New York City in the wake of the imposition of martial law in Poland by its Communist government. There, he was nominated for the Charles MacArthur Award for Outstanding New Play for Antigone in New York (1994). He was prominent in New York City society and the arts.

Głowacki taught creative writing at Columbia University and Bennington College. Additionally he worked as the visiting playwright at New York Public Theater, Mark Taper Forum and Atlantic Center for the Arts.

On August 19, 2017, Głowacki died unexpectedly during his holidays in Egypt.

== Awards and honours ==
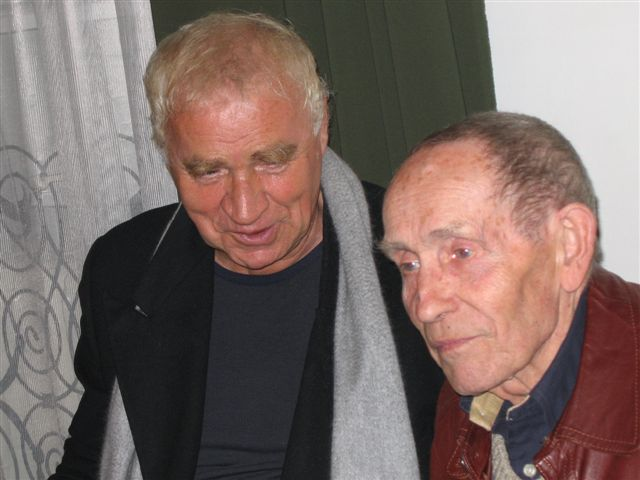
Janusz Głowacki and Tadeusz Konwicki (Warsaw, 2005)

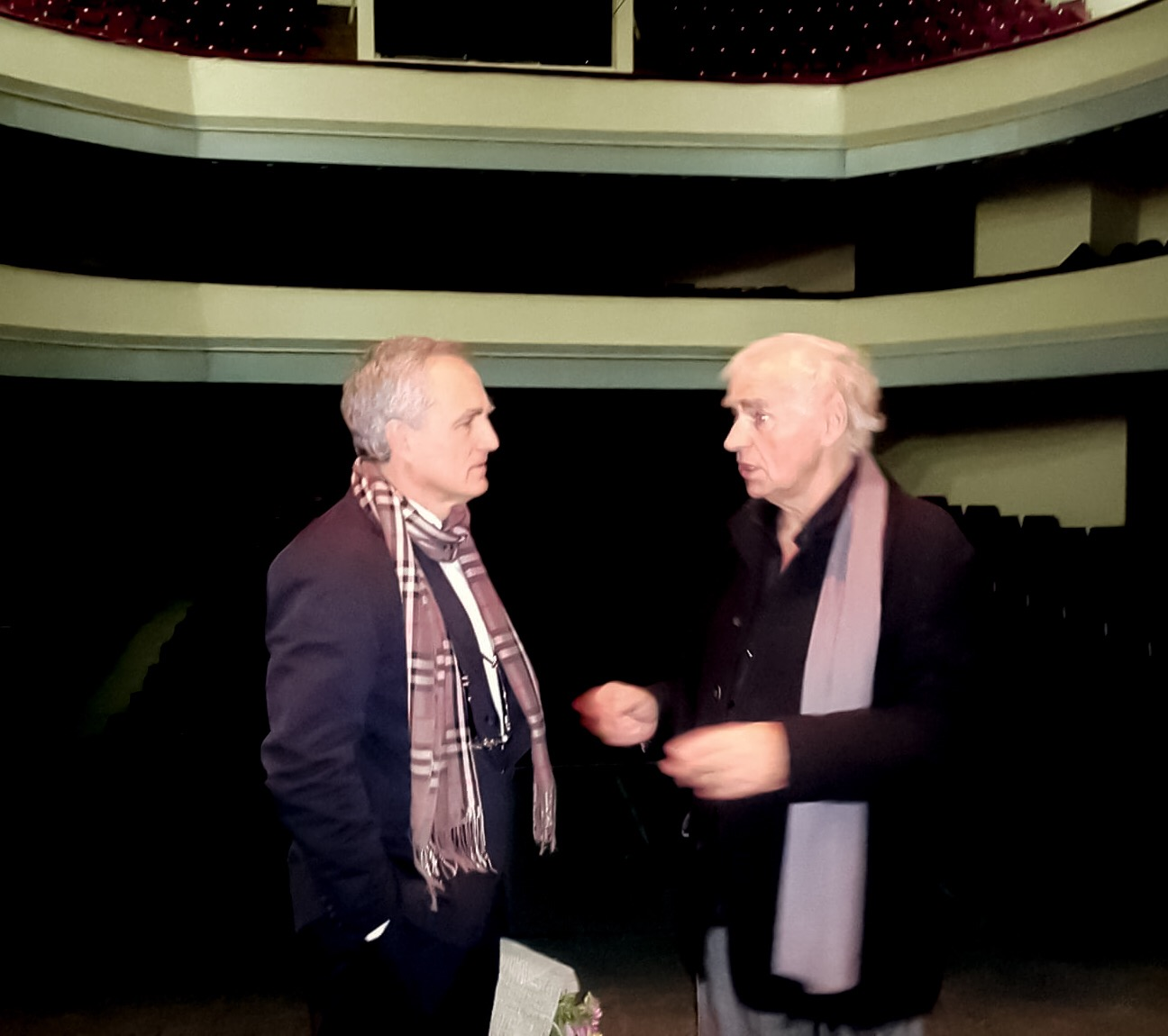
Janusz Głowacki and Andrzej Szczytko (Kharkiv Ukrainian Drama Theatre, 2014)

- 1982: The Guardian and The Times named Cinders the best play of the year
- 1987: American Theatre Critics Association Award for Hunting Cockroaches
- 1987: Joseph Kesselring Honorary Mention
- 1987: John S. Guggenheim Award
- 1987: Hollywood Drama League Critics Award
- 1987: Time Magazine named Hunting Cockroaches the best play of the year
- 1988: National Endowment for the Arts
- 1993: Time Magazine named Antigone in New York one of the best plays of the year
- 1994: Nomination for The Charles MacArthur Award for Outstanding New Play for Antigone in New York
- 1994: Jurzykowski Prize
- 1997: Le Baladin Award, Paris
- 1997: Students of Sorbonne Award, Paris
- 1998: Critics Award for Antigone in New York, staged in Proscenium Theatre in Paris
- 1999: Tony Cox Award at Nantucket Film Festival
- 2001: The Fourth Sister wins at International Theatre Festival in Dubrovnik
- 2002: Grand Prix for the best author at "Rzeczywistość przedstawiona" Festival
- 2002: Nomination for Nike Award
- 2003: Grand Prix at Two Theatres Festival
- 2005: Śląski Wawrzyn Literacki
- 2005: Award of Ministry of Culture and National Heritage for literature
- 2005: Nomination for Nike Award
- 2011: Czesław Miłosz Award given by US Embassy in Warsaw
- 2011: Warsaw Literary Award
- 2013: Gustaw Award
- 2013: Special Award "Diamond of Polish Radio Three"
- 2013: Neptune Award - Gdańsk Literary Award
- 2013: Jan Michalski Prize for Literature, finalist, Good Night, Dzerzi!
- 2018: Winner of European Film Award for Best Screenplay for Cold War (with Paweł Pawlikowski)
- 2019: Nomination for BAFTA Award for Best Original Screenplay (with Paweł Pawlikowski)
