= Trzeba zabić tę miłość =

1972 film directed by Janusz Morgenstern

- Directed by: Janusz Morgenstern
- Written by: Janusz Głowacki
- Cinematography: Zygmunt Samosiuk
- Edited by: Barbara Kosidowska
- Music by: Bohdan Mazurek
- Release date: 1972
- Country: Poland
- Language: Polish

Trzeba zabić tę miłość is a 1972 film directed by Janusz Morgenstern and written by Janusz Głowacki.

== Production ==
The film was shot in Warsaw.

== Cast ==
- Jadwiga Jankowska-Cieślak as Magda
- Andrzej Malec as Andrzej; dubbing by Piotr Fronczewski (the latter was not credited)
- Władysław Kowalski as physician
- Barbara Wrzesińska as the boss's wife, Andrzej's lover
- Alicja Jachiewicz as Dzidzia, partner of Magda's father
- Jan Englert as Andrzej's boss, the owner of a car repair shop
- Janusz Bylczyński as Magda's father
- Tomasz Lengren as Staszek, Andrzej's roommate
- Jan Himilsbach as construction site caretaker
- Ryszard Pracz as militiaman Rysio
- Andrzej Dobosz as a man summoned before the commission for work evaders
- Ewa Ziętek as nurse
- Bożena Dykiel as nurse
- Witold Dębicki as Seminarian Władek, Andrzej's friend
- Mieczysław Łoza as chairman of the committee on work-evaders, an acquaintance of Andrzej’s father

Source.

== Reception ==
For her role of Magda, Jadwiga Jankowska-Cieślak received Zbigniew Cybulski Award in 1973.

The film was included in the film series Martin Scorsese Presents: Masterpieces of Polish Cinema.

== Bibliography ==
- Dondzik, Michał (2012). "Miłość, kontestacja i pies. Trzeba zabić tę miłość". Musi zostać rysa. Przewodnik po twórczości Janusza Morgensterna. Łódź. pp. 162–173. ISBN 978-83-88820-45-8.
