= Janusz Morgenstern =

Polish film director and producer

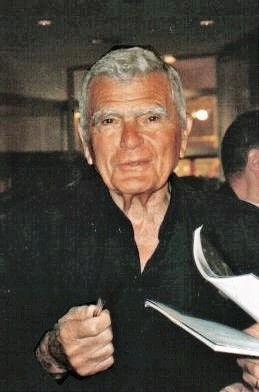
- Janusz Morgenstern
- Born: 16 November 1922
- Died: 6 September 2011 (aged 88)
- Occupations: Film director and producer

Janusz “Kuba” Morgenstern (16 November 1922 – 6 September 2011) was a Polish film director and producer.

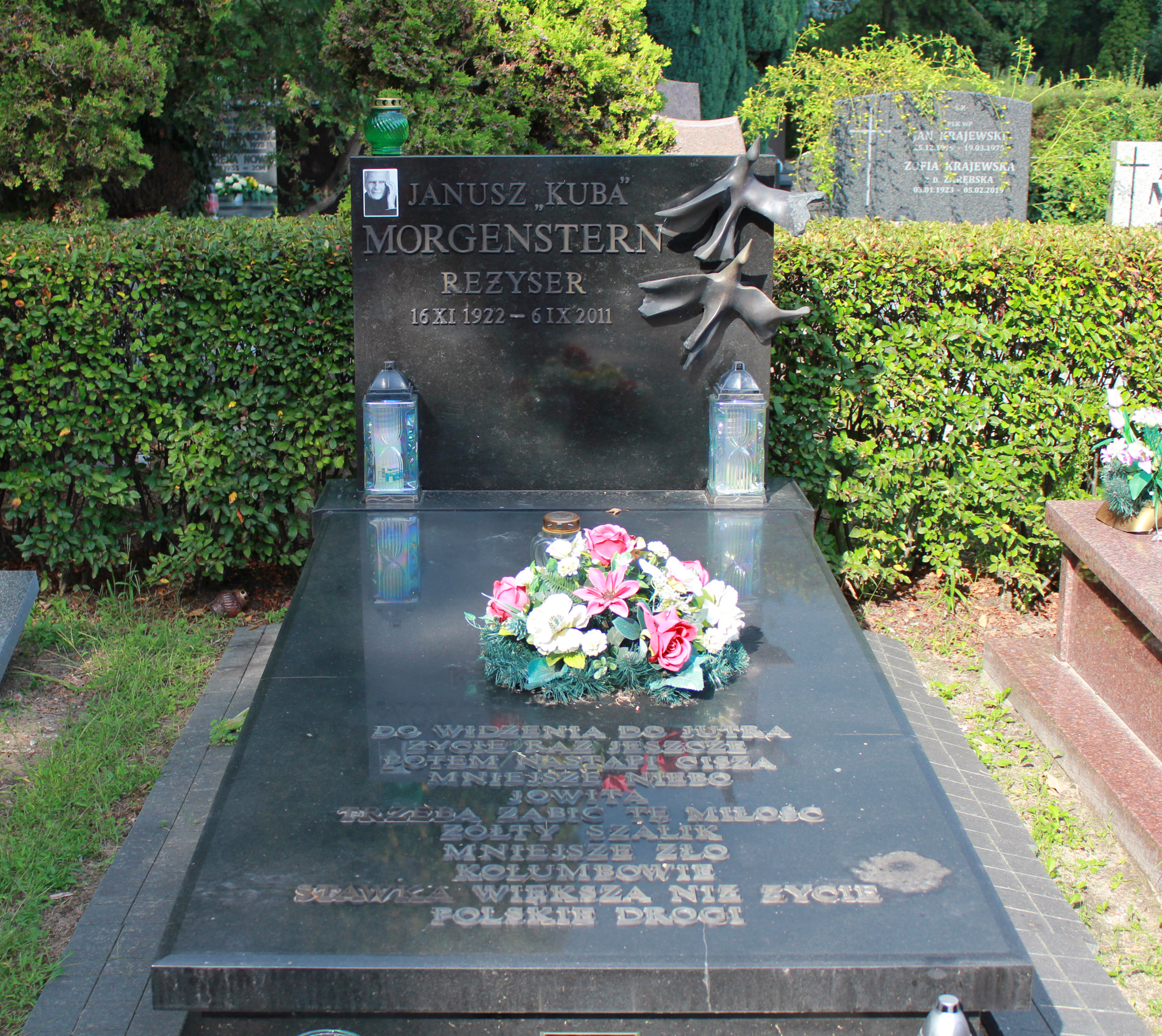
The grave of Morgenstern at the Powązki Military Cemetery featuring his picture and a list of his most famous films

== Biography ==
Janusz Morgenstern was born in 1922 to a Jewish family in the town of Mikulińce, Poland (now Mykulyntsi, Ukraine), to Dawid Morgenstern and Estera (née Druks).

He was second director of the films: Prawdziwy koniec wielkiej wojny by Jerzy Kawalerowicz, Popiół i diament and Lotna by Andrzej Wajda. He debuted as a director with the film Goodbye, See You Tomorrow (1960). His other films include Jowita (1967), We Have to Kill this Love (1972), W-Hour (1979), Lesser of Two Evils (2009). TV series directed by Morgenstern included: More Than Life at Stake (1967–1968), Columbuses (1970) and Polish Roads (1976).

He died in Warsaw, Poland.

== Selected filmography ==
- Goodbye, See You Tomorrow (1960)
- Tomorrow Premiere (1962)
- Life Once More (1964)
- Then Silence (1965)
- More Than Life at Stake (1967)
- Kolumbowie (1970)
- We Have to Kill This Love (1972)
- Polish Roads (1976)
- A Smaller Sky (1980)
- The Yellow Scarf (2000)
- The Lesser Evil (2009)
