= Andrzej Barszczyński =

Polish film director

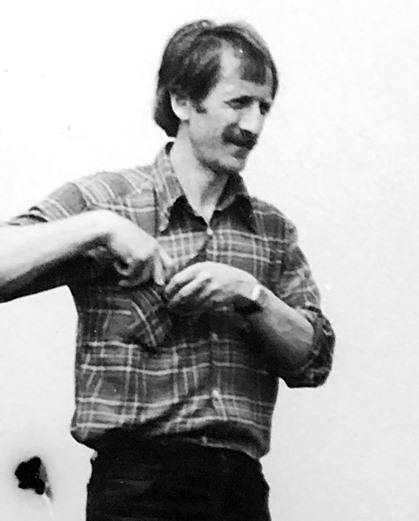
Andrzej Barszczyński, 1982

Andrzej Barszczyński (born 26 March 1941) is a Polish film director, screenwriter and camera operator. He is best known as a co-screenwriter for the cult film Rejs (1970).

== Biography ==
He was born in Warsaw, Poland. After the Second World War, Barszczyński and his parents moved to Prudnik. He studied at the Adam Mickiewicz High School in Prudnik, Łódź Film School and the American Film Institute in Los Angeles.

== Filmography ==
- 1970: Rejs – co-screenwriter, camera operator
- 1972: Kwiat paproci – screenwriter
- 1981: Murmurando – director, screenwriter
- 1982: Kilka dni na ziemi niczyjej – camera operator
- 1983: Incydent na pustyni – camera operator
- 1983: Śledztwo porucznika Tomaszka – camera operator
- 1984: Fetysz – camera operator
- 1985: Okruchy wojny – director, screenwriter
- 1987: Dzikun – director, screenwriter
- 1989: Ring – director, screenwriter
- 1990: Tajemnica puszczy – director, screenwriter
