= Julian Grobelny =

Polish politician

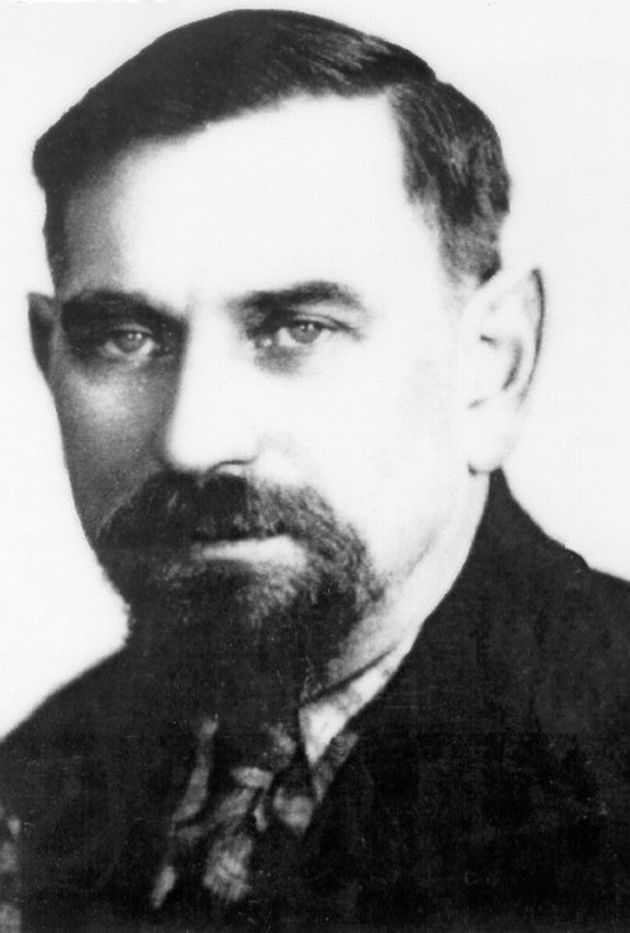
- Grobelny before World War II
- Born: 16 February 1893; Brzeziny, Poland
- Died: 5 December 1944 (aged 51); Mińsk Mazowiecki
- Occupation: Union activist
- Known for: Holocaust rescue

Julian Grobelny (16 February 1893 – 5 December 1944) was an activist in the Polish Socialist Party (PPS) from 1915, in the lead-up to Poland's return to independence. During the interwar period he was a social activist. After the German-Soviet invasion of Poland in 1939, and the ensuing Holocaust, he became President of Żegota (Council for Aid to Jews) active in the General Government territory of occupied Poland. The clandestine organization was named after a fictional character Konrad Żegota born on the exact day of its inception in 1942. Grobelny served as president of Żegota until the end of hostilities.

== Life ==
Born in Brzeziny, about 20 kilometres (12 mi) east of Łódź, Grobelny took part in the Silesian Uprisings and worked as an activist among the workers of Łódź in the Second Polish Republic before the war broke out. As soon as the Nazis entered the city however, the Grobelnys found themselves listed as enemies of the Third Reich; went into hiding, and relocated to Warsaw.

=== Saving Jews ===
Despite suffering from tuberculosis, Grobelny – together with his wife Halina (born 1900) – was personally involved in the rescue of a large number of Polish Jews during the German occupation of Poland. The couple was famous for their preoccupation with saving particularly Jewish children from the Holocaust by entering the Warsaw Ghetto and walking out with them as their own. They harbored over a dozen Jewish PPS activists in their home, and worked in close co-operation with Irena Sendler, head of the children’s section of Żegota. Julian (pseudonym "Trojan") and Halina turned their modest house in Cegłów near Mińsk Mazowiecki into a temporary shelter for Jews until they could be moved into a more permanent place. They offered protection to whoever needed it most, especially those who fled from the Ghetto in Warsaw. The Grobelnys devoted most of their time and energy to rescue work, but also helped Jewish adults by supplying them with “Aryan” papers, money and medicines.

== The arrest ==
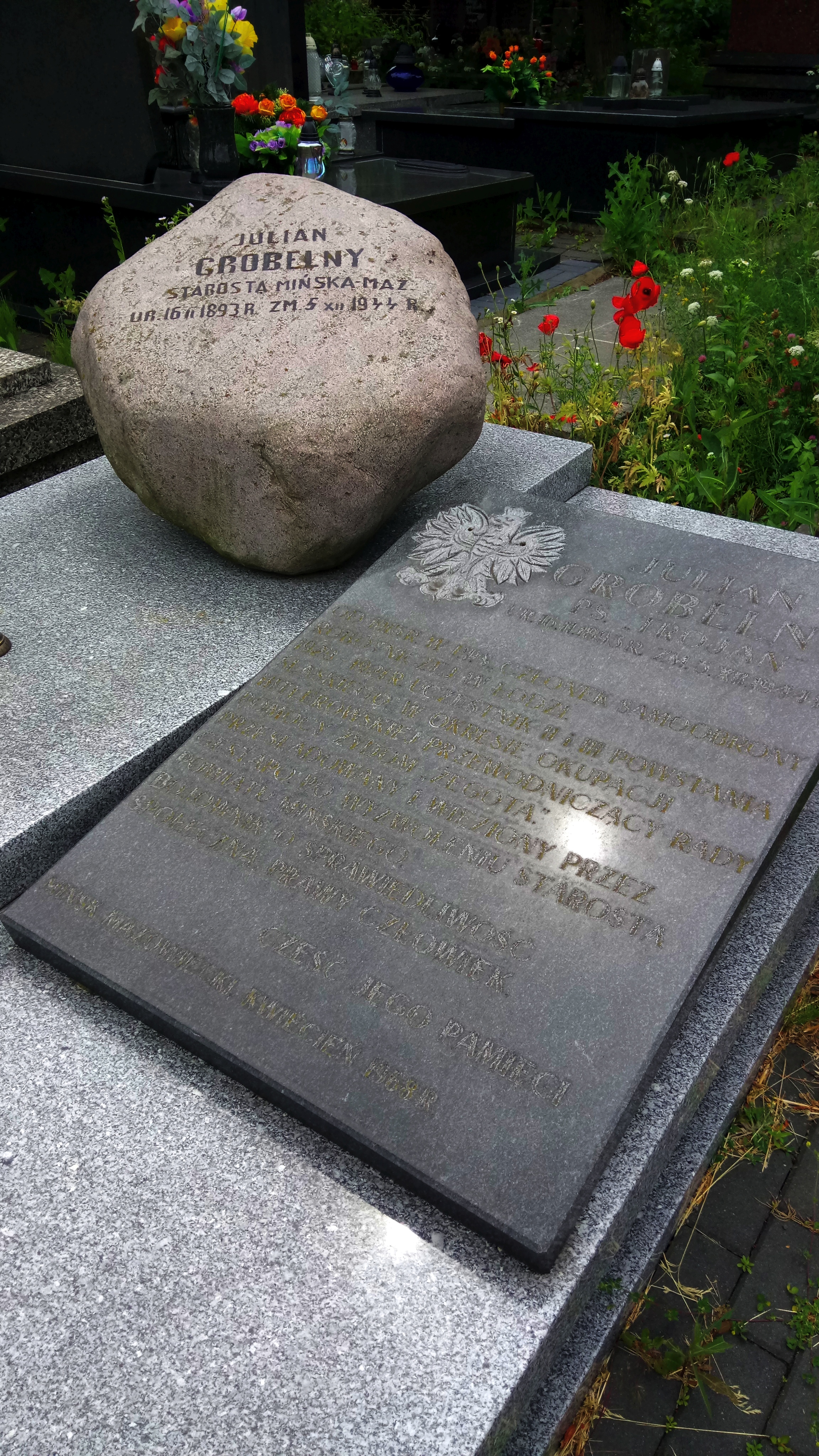
Julian Grobelny's grave at cemetery in Mińsk Mazowiecki.

In March 1944 the Gestapo arrested Grobelny without knowing about his clandestine work. He survived, thanks to help from physician friends, Dr. Z. Franio, Dr. M. Ropek, Dr. J. Majkowski and Dr. J. Rutkiewicz who were aiding him in prison. Soon before the war's end Grobelny became mayor of Mińsk Mazowiecki. He died there of tuberculosis on 5 December 1944. Grobelny is buried at a cemetery in Mińsk Mazowiecki. The names of Julian and Halina Grobelny figure prominently in books about humanitarian aid to the Jews of Warsaw and elsewhere during the occupation. On 8 March 1987 Yad Vashem recognized Halina and Julian Grobelny as Righteous Among the Nations.
